= 2024–25 Purdue Boilermakers men's basketball team =

American college basketball season

2024–25 Purdue Boilermakers men's basketball

Rady Children's Invitational champions

NCAA tournament, Sweet Sixteen
- Conference: Big Ten Conference

Ranking
- Coaches: No. 12
- AP: No. 14
- Record: 24–12 (13–7 Big Ten)
- Head coach: Matt Painter (20th season)
- Assistant coaches: Brandon Brantley (12th season); Terry Johnson (4th season); Paul Lusk (4th season)
- Home arena: Mackey Arena

2024–25 Big Ten Conference men's basketball standings
	Conf.				Overall
Team	W		L	PCT	W		L	PCT
No. 7 Michigan State	17	–	3	.850	30	–	7	.811
No. 9 Maryland	14	–	6	.700	27	–	9	.750
No. 10 Michigan †	14	–	6	.700	27	–	10	.730
UCLA	13	–	7	.650	23	–	11	.676
No. 16 Wisconsin	13	–	7	.650	27	–	10	.730
No. 14 Purdue	13	–	7	.650	24	–	12	.667
Illinois	12	–	8	.600	22	–	13	.629
Oregon	12	–	8	.600	25	–	10	.714
Indiana	10	–	10	.500	19	–	13	.594
Ohio State	9	–	11	.450	17	–	15	.531
Rutgers	8	–	12	.400	15	–	17	.469
Minnesota	7	–	13	.350	15	–	17	.469
Northwestern	7	–	13	.350	17	–	16	.515
USC	7	–	13	.350	17	–	18	.486
Iowa	7	–	13	.350	17	–	16	.515
Nebraska	7	–	13	.350	21	–	14	.600
Penn State	6	–	14	.300	16	–	15	.516
Washington	4	–	16	.200	13	–	18	.419
† 2025 Big Ten tournament winner Rankings from AP poll

The 2024–25 Purdue Boilermakers men's basketball team represented Purdue University in the 2024–25 NCAA Division I men's basketball season. Their head coach was Matt Painter, who was in his 20th season with the Boilermakers. The Boilermakers played their home games at Mackey Arena in West Lafayette, Indiana as members of the Big Ten Conference.

Purdue finished their regular season in a three-way tie for fourth place in the Big Ten conference. The team finished the season 24–12, 13–7 in Big Ten play. They defeated USC in the second round of the Big Ten tournament before losing to Michigan in the quarterfinals. They received an at-large bid to the NCAA tournament as the No. 4 seed in the Midwest region. They defeated High Point and McNeese State in the first two rounds before losing to Houston in the Sweet Sixteen.

The Purdue Boilermakers drew an average home attendance of 14,876, the 14th-highest of all college basketball teams.

== Previous season ==
With their win over Michigan State on March 2, 2024, Purdue clinched a share of their 26th Big Ten regular season championship. Three days later, the Boilermakers clinched the Big Ten title outright for the second consecutive year with their victory over Illinois. The team finished the season 34–5, 17–3 in Big Ten play. They defeated Michigan State in the quarterfinals of the Big Ten tournament before losing to Wisconsin in the semifinals. They received an at-large bid to the NCAA tournament as the No. 1 seed in the Midwest region. It marked the second consecutive year as a No. 1 seed. They defeated Grambling State and Utah State to break the school record of most wins in a season. They defeated Gonzaga in the Sweet Sixteen and defeated Tennessee in the Elite Eight to return to the Final Four for the first time since 1980. In the Final Four, they defeated NC State to advance to the National Championship game, their first since 1969, where they lost to No. 1 overall seed UConn.

== Offseason ==
=== Departures ===
Name	Number	Pos.	Height	Weight	Year	Hometown	Reason for departure
Mason Gillis	0	F	6'6"	225	Senior	New Castle, IN	Transferred to Duke
Zach Edey	15	C	7'4"	300	Senior	Toronto, ON	Declared for the 2024 NBA draft; selected 9th overall pick by the Memphis Grizzlies
Chase Martin	22	G	6'2"	180	Senior	Coumbia, MO	Walk-on; graduated; Transferred to Missouri State
Ethan Morton	25	G	6'7"	215	Senior	Butler, PA	Transferred to Colorado State
Carson Barrett	34	G	6'5"	210	Senior	Lafayette, IN	Walk-on; graduated
Lance Jones	55	G	6'1"	200	GS Senior	Evanston, IL	Graduated

=== Incoming transfers ===
Name	Number	Pos.	Height	Weight	Year	Hometown	Previous school
Jack Lusk	9	G	6'4"	195	Sophomore	Elkhorn, NE	Millikin

=== Recruiting classes ===
==== 2024 recruiting class ====
College recruiting
Name	Hometown	School	Height	Weight	Commit date
Daniel Jacobsen; C	Wolfeboro, NH	Brewster Academy	7 ft 3 in (2.21 m)	235 lb (107 kg)	Nov 3, 2023
Daniel Jacobsen; C	Recruit ratings: Rivals: 247Sports:				
Gicarri Harris; CG	Loganville, GA	Grayson High School	6 ft 4 in (1.93 m)	180 lb (82 kg)	Nov 15, 2023
Gicarri Harris; CG	Recruit ratings: Rivals: 247Sports:				
Raleigh Burgess; C	Cincinnati, OH	Sycamore High School	6 ft 10 in (2.08 m)	205 lb (93 kg)	May 1, 2023
Raleigh Burgess; C	Recruit ratings: Rivals: 247Sports:				
CJ Cox; CG	Milton, MA	Milton Academy	6 ft 2 in (1.88 m)	175 lb (79 kg)	Oct 1, 2023
CJ Cox; CG	Recruit ratings: Rivals: 247Sports:				
Jack Benter; SG	Brownstown, IN	Brownstown Central High School	6 ft 4 in (1.93 m)	180 lb (82 kg)	Jul 14, 2022
Jack Benter; SG	Recruit ratings: Rivals: 247Sports:				
Overall recruit ranking: Rivals: 22 247Sports: 18 ESPN: —
Note: In many cases, Scout, Rivals, 247Sports, On3, and ESPN may conflict in their listings of height and weight.; In these cases, the average was taken. ESPN grades are on a 100-point scale.; Sources: "Purdue 2024 Basketball Commitments". Rivals.; "2024 Purdue Boilermakers Recruiting Class". ESPN.; "2024 Team Ranking". Rivals.; "2024–25 Purdue Boilermakers men's basketball team". 247Sports.

==== 2025 recruiting class ====
College recruiting
Name	Hometown	School	Height	Weight	Commit date
Antione West, Jr. SG	Toledo, OH	Whitmer High School	6 ft 4 in (1.93 m)	180 lb (82 kg)	Oct 1, 2024
Antione West, Jr. SG	Recruit ratings: Rivals: 247Sports: ESPN:				
Omer Mayer; G	Tel Aviv, Israel	Maccabi Tel Aviv B.C.	6 ft 4 in (1.93 m)	215 lb (98 kg)	Apr 16, 2025
Omer Mayer; G	Recruit ratings: Rivals: 247Sports: On3:				
Overall recruit ranking:
Note: In many cases, Scout, Rivals, 247Sports, On3, and ESPN may conflict in their listings of height and weight.; In these cases, the average was taken. ESPN grades are on a 100-point scale.; Sources: "Purdue 2025 Basketball Commitments". Rivals.; "2025 Purdue Boilermakers Recruiting Class". ESPN.; "2025 Team Ranking". Rivals.; "2024–25 Purdue Boilermakers men's basketball team". 247Sports.

== Roster ==
2024–25 Purdue Boilermakers men's basketball team
Players
Coaches

Pos.	#	Name	Height	Weight	Year	Previous school	Hometown
G	0	C.J. Cox	6 ft 3 in (1.91 m)	200 lb (91 kg)	Fr	Milton Academy	Lexington, MA
F	1	Caleb Furst	6 ft 10 in (2.08 m)	235 lb (107 kg)	Sr	Blackhawk Christian School	Fort Wayne, IN
G	2	Fletcher Loyer	6 ft 5 in (1.96 m)	180 lb (82 kg)	Jr	Homestead HS	Fort Wayne, IN
G	3	Braden Smith	6 ft 0 in (1.83 m)	170 lb (77 kg)	Jr	Westfield HS	Westfield, IN
F	4	Trey Kaufman-Renn	6 ft 9 in (2.06 m)	230 lb (104 kg)	RS Jr	Silver Creek HS	Sellersburg, IN
G	5	Myles Colvin	6 ft 5 in (1.96 m)	205 lb (93 kg)	So	Heritage Christian	Indianapolis, IN
G	6	Aaron Fine (W)	6 ft 2 in (1.88 m)	190 lb (86 kg)	Fr	Noblesville HS	Noblesville, IN
F	7	Sam King (W)	6 ft 9 in (2.06 m)	230 lb (104 kg)	Jr	Columbus North HS	Columbus, IN
G	9	Jack Lusk (W)	6 ft 4 in (1.93 m)	195 lb (88 kg)	So	Elkhorn North HS	Elkhorn, NE
F	11	Brian Waddell	6 ft 7 in (2.01 m)	195 lb (88 kg)	RS Jr	Carmel HS	Carmel, IN
C	12	Daniel Jacobsen (injured)	7 ft 4 in (2.24 m)	230 lb (104 kg)	Fr	Brewster Academy	Chicago, IL
G	14	Jack Benter (redshirt)	6 ft 5 in (1.96 m)	210 lb (95 kg)	Fr	Brownstown Central HS	Brownstown, IN
F	20	Josh Furst (W)	6 ft 6 in (1.98 m)	200 lb (91 kg)	So	Blackhawk Christian	Fort Wayne, IN
F	23	Camden Heide	6 ft 7 in (2.01 m)	205 lb (93 kg)	RS So	Wasatch Academy	Wayzata, MN
G	24	Gicarri Harris	6 ft 3 in (1.91 m)	200 lb (91 kg)	Fr	Grayson HS	Atlanta, GA
G	32	Jace Rayl (W)	5 ft 11 in (1.8 m)	175 lb (79 kg)	So	Kokomo HS	Kokomo, IN
F	34	Raleigh Burgess	6 ft 11 in (2.11 m)	240 lb (109 kg)	Fr	Sycamore HS	Cincinnati, OH
C	44	Will Berg	7 ft 2 in (2.18 m)	260 lb (118 kg)	RS So	Riksbasketgymnasiet Luleå	Stockholm, Sweden

Head coach

- Matt Painter (Purdue)

Assistant coach(es)

- Brandon Brantley (Purdue)
- Terry Johnson (Purdue Fort Wayne)
- Paul Lusk (Southern Illinois)

Legend

- (C) Team captain
- (S) Suspended
- (I) Ineligible
- (W) Walk-on
- Injured
- Current redshirt

Roster

== Schedule and results ==
Date time, TV	Rank^{#}	Opponent^{#}	Result	Record	High points	High rebounds	High assists	Site (attendance) city, state
Exhibition
October 26, 2024*; 8:00 p.m., NPM	No. 14	at No. 15 Creighton; United Way of the Midlands; Tornado Disaster Relief Fund	L 87–93	−	31 – Smith	8 – Kaufman-Renn	5 – Loyer	CHI Health Center Omaha (15,947); Omaha, NE
October 30, 2024*; 7:00 p.m., B1G+	No. 14	Grand Valley State	W 99–41	−	15 – Tied	10 – Kaufman-Renn	5 – Smith	Mackey Arena (14,876); West Lafayette, IN
Regular season
November 4, 2024*; 6:00 p.m., BTN	No. 14	Texas A&M–Corpus Christi	W 90–73	1–0	21 – Loyer	9 – Kaufman-Renn	15 – Smith	Mackey Arena (14,876); West Lafayette, IN
November 8, 2024*; 7:00 p.m., B1G+	No. 14	Northern Kentucky	W 72–50	2–0	16 – Loyer	7 – Berg	7 – Smith	Mackey Arena (14,876); West Lafayette, IN
November 11, 2024*; 8:00 p.m., BTN	No. 13	Yale	W 92–84	3–0	22 – Smith	9 – Smith	6 – Smith	Mackey Arena (14,876); West Lafayette, IN
November 15, 2024*; 7:00 p.m., Peacock	No. 13	No. 2 Alabama	W 87–78	4–0	26 – Kaufman-Renn	8 – Kaufman-Renn	10 – Smith	Mackey Arena (14,876); West Lafayette, IN
November 19, 2024*; 9:00 p.m., FS1	No. 6	at No. 15 Marquette	L 58–76	4–1	16 – Kaufman-Renn	8 – Kaufman-Renn	9 – Smith	Fiserv Forum (16,801); Milwaukee, WI
November 23, 2024*; 12:00 p.m., B1G+	No. 6	Marshall	W 80–45	5–1	18 – Kaufman-Renn	5 – Burgess	9 – Smith	Mackey Arena (14,876); West Lafayette, IN
November 28, 2024*; 3:00 p.m., FS1	No. 13	vs. NC State; Rady Children's Invitational Semifinal	W 71–61	6–1	22 – Kaufman-Renn	8 – Kaufman-Renn	6 – Smith	LionTree Arena (4,000); San Diego, CA
November 29, 2024*; 6:00 p.m., FOX	No. 13	vs. No. 23 Ole Miss; Rady Children's Invitational Championship Game	W 80–78	7–1	25 – Kaufman-Renn	13 – Kaufman-Renn	11 – Smith	LionTree Arena (4,000); San Diego, CA
December 5, 2024; 6:30 p.m., FS1	No. 8	at Penn State	L 70–81	7–2 (0–1)	15 – Tied	4 – Tied	5 – Smith	Bryce Jordan Center (8,802); State College, PA
December 8, 2024; 12:00 p.m., BTN	No. 8	Maryland	W 83–78	8–2 (1–1)	24 – Smith	8 – Kaufmann-Renn	10 – Smith	Mackey Arena; West Lafayette, IN
December 14, 2024*; 12:00 p.m., CBS	No. 11	vs. No. 17 Texas A&M; Indy Classic	L 66–70	8–3	15 – Smith	6 – Smith	6 – Smith	Gainbridge Fieldhouse; Indianapolis, IN
December 21, 2024*; 4:30 p.m., ESPN	No. 16	vs. No. 2 Auburn; Battle in Birmingham	L 69–87	8–4	16 – Cox	8 – Kaufmann-Renn	6 – Smith	Legacy Arena (15,355); Birmingham, AL
December 29, 2024*; 6:00 p.m., BTN	No. 21	Toledo	W 83–64	9–4	34 – Smith	6 – Kaufmann-Renn	12 – Smith	Mackey Arena (14,876); West Lafayette, IN
January 2, 2025; 8:00 p.m., FS1	No. 20	at Minnesota	W 81–61	10–4 (2–1)	24 – Loyer	6 – Tied	10 – Smith	Williams Arena (9,754); Minneapolis, MN
January 5, 2025; 2:00 p.m., BTN	No. 20	Northwestern	W 79–61	11–4 (3–1)	22 – Smith	8 – Cox	7 – Smith	Mackey Arena (14,876); West Lafayette, IN
January 9, 2025; 6:00 p.m., FS1	No. 20	at Rutgers	W 68–50	12–4 (4–1)	16 – Tied	7 – C. Furst	14 – Smith	Jersey Mike's Arena (8,000); Piscataway, NJ
January 12, 2025; 12:00 p.m., BTN	No. 20	Nebraska	W 104–68	13–4 (5–1)	23 – Cox	6 – Kaufman-Renn	14 – Smith	Mackey Arena (14,876); West Lafayette, IN
January 15, 2025; 9:30 p.m., BTN	No. 17	at Washington	W 69–58	14–4 (6–1)	19 – Kaufman-Renn	6 – Tied	5 – Smith	Alaska Airlines Arena (7,789); Seattle, WA
January 18, 2025; 3:00 p.m., NBC	No. 17	at No. 13 Oregon	W 65–58	15–4 (7–1)	23 – Kaufman-Renn	11 – Kaufman-Renn	7 – Smith	Matthew Knight Arena (12,364); Eugene, OR
January 21, 2025; 7:30 p.m., Peacock	No. 11	Ohio State	L 70–73	15–5 (7–2)	26 – Kaufman-Renn	7 – Kaufman-Renn	8 – Smith	Mackey Arena (14,876); West Lafayette, IN
January 24, 2025; 8:00 p.m., FOX	No. 11	No. 21 Michigan	W 91–64	16–5 (8–2)	24 – Smith	7 – Smith	10 – Smith	Mackey Arena (14,876); West Lafayette, IN
January 31, 2025; 8:00 p.m., FOX	No. 10	Indiana; Rivalry/Indiana National Guard Governor's Cup	W 81–76	17–5 (9–2)	24 – Smith	5 – Heide	7 – Smith	Mackey Arena (14,876); West Lafayette, IN
February 4, 2025; 7:00 p.m., Peacock	No. 7	at Iowa	W 90–81	18–5 (10–2)	31 – Smith	9 – C. Furst	4 – Tied	Carver–Hawkeye Arena (8,445); Iowa City, IA
February 7, 2025; 7:00 p.m., FS1	No. 7	USC	W 90–72	19–5 (11–2)	24 – Kaufman-Renn	10 – Tied	13 – Smith	Mackey Arena (14,876); West Lafayette, IN
February 11, 2025; 7:00 p.m., Peacock	No. 7	at No. 20 Michigan	L 73–75	19–6 (11–3)	24 – Smith	7 – Tied	5 – Smith	Crisler Center (12,707); Ann Arbor, MI
February 15, 2025; 1:00 p.m., CBS	No. 7	No. 16 Wisconsin	L 84–94	19–7 (11–4)	30 – Kaufman-Renn	6 – Cox	12 – Smith	Mackey Arena (14,876); West Lafayette, IN
February 18, 2025; 7:00 p.m., Peacock	No. 13	at No. 14 Michigan State	L 66–75	19–8 (11–5)	24 – Kaufman-Renn	5 – Tied	8 – Smith	Breslin Student Events Center (14,797); East Lansing, MI
February 23, 2025; 1:30 p.m., CBS	No. 13	at Indiana; Rivalry/Indiana National Guard Governor's Cup	L 58–73	19–9 (11–6)	20 – Loyer	6 – Cox	5 – Smith	Simon Skjodt Assembly Hall (17,222); Bloomington, IN
February 28, 2025; 8:00 p.m., FOX	No. 20	UCLA	W 76–66	20–9 (12–6)	29 – Kaufman-Renn	9 – Heide	8 – Smith	Mackey Arena (14,876); West Lafayette, IN
March 4, 2025; 7:00 p.m., Peacock	No. 18	Rutgers	W 100–71	21–9 (13–6)	23 – Tied	9 – C. Furst	9 – Smith	Mackey Arena (14,876); West Lafayette, IN
March 7, 2025; 8:00 p.m., FOX	No. 18	at Illinois	L 80–88	21–10 (13–7)	29 – Kaufman-Renn	9 – Smith	12 – Smith	State Farm Center (15,544); Champaign, IL
Big Ten tournament
March 13, 2025; 9:00 p.m., BTN	(6) No. 20	vs. (14) USC; Second Round	W 76–71	22–10	30 – Kaufman-Renn	11 – Heide	9 – Smith	Gainbridge Fieldhouse (13,411); Indianapolis, IN
March 14, 2025; 9:00 p.m., CBS	(6) No. 20	vs. (3) No. 22 Michigan; Quarterfinals	L 68–86	22–11	24 – Kaufman-Renn	9 – Kaufman-Renn	6 – Smith	Gainbridge Fieldhouse (13,951); Indianapolis, IN
NCAA tournament
March 20, 2025*; 12:40 p.m., TruTV	(4 MW) No. 22	vs. (13 MW) High Point; First Round	W 75–63	23–11	21 – Kaufman-Renn	10 – Heide	6 – Smith	Amica Mutual Pavilion (11,441); Providence, RI
March 22, 2025*; 12:10 p.m., CBS	(4 MW) No. 22	vs. (12 MW) McNeese; Second Round	W 76–62	24–11	22 – Kaufman-Renn	15 – Kaufman-Renn	5 – Tied	Amica Mutual Pavilion (11,487); Providence, RI
March 28, 2025*; 10:09 p.m., TBS	(4 MW) No. 22	vs. (1 MW) No. 2 Houston; Sweet Sixteen	L 60–62	24–12	16 – Loyer	5 – Tied	15 – Smith	Lucas Oil Stadium (28,968); Indianapolis, IN
*Non-conference game. ^{#}Rankings from AP Poll. (#) Tournament seedings in parentheses. MW=Midwest. All times are in Eastern Time.

== Rankings ==
Ranking movements Legend: ██ Increase in ranking ██ Decrease in ranking
	Week																				
Poll	Pre	1	2	3	4	5	6	7	8	9	10	11	12	13	14	15	16	17	18	19	Final
AP	14	13	6	13	8	11	16	21	20	20	17	11	10	7	7	13	20	18	20	22	14
Coaches	13	12	6	12	7	11	17	25	22	19	15	12	10	7	7	14	19	18	20	22	12
