= 2021–22 Big Ten Conference men's basketball season =

- League: NCAA Division I
- Sport: Basketball
- Teams: 14
- TV partner(s): Big Ten Network, ESPN, Fox, FS1, CBS

2021–22 NCAA Division I men's basketball season
- Regular season champions (shared): Illinois and Wisconsin
- Season MVP: Johnny Davis, Wisconsin
- Top scorer: Keegan Murray, Iowa

Tournament
- Venue: Gainbridge Fieldhouse, Indianapolis, Indiana
- Champions: Iowa
- Runners-up: Purdue
- Finals MVP: Keegan Murray

Basketball seasons
- 2020–21 2022–23

2021–22 Big Ten Conference men's basketball standings
	Conf.				Overall
Team	W		L	PCT	W		L	PCT
No. 19 Illinois	15	–	5	.750	23	–	10	.697
No. 14 Wisconsin	15	–	5	.750	25	–	8	.758
No. 10 Purdue	14	–	6	.700	29	–	8	.784
Rutgers	12	–	8	.600	18	–	14	.563
No. 16 Iowa †	12	–	8	.600	26	–	10	.722
Ohio State	12	–	8	.600	20	–	12	.625
Michigan State	11	–	9	.550	23	–	13	.639
Michigan	11	–	9	.550	19	–	15	.559
Indiana	9	–	11	.450	21	–	14	.600
Maryland	7	–	13	.350	15	–	17	.469
Penn State	7	–	13	.350	14	–	17	.452
Northwestern	7	–	13	.350	15	–	16	.484
Nebraska	4	–	16	.200	10	–	22	.313
Minnesota	4	–	16	.200	13	–	17	.433
† Conference tournament winner Rankings from AP poll

The 2021–22 Big Ten men's basketball season was the season for Big Ten Conference basketball teams that began with practices in October 2021, followed by the start of the 2021–22 NCAA Division I men's basketball season in November 2021. The regular season ended in March 2022.

With a win over Purdue on March 1, 2022, Wisconsin clinched at least a share of the Big Ten regular season championship. Illinois clinched a share of the regular season titled on March 6 when Wisconsin lost its final game to Nebraska and the Illini held on to beat Iowa. It marked the first conference championship for Illinois since 2005.

The Big Ten tournament was held March 9 through March 13, 2022 at Gainbridge Fieldhouse in Indianapolis, Indiana. Iowa won the tournament, defeating Purdue in the championship game.

Wisconsin forward Johnny Davis was named Big Ten Player of the Year. Wisconsin coach Greg Gard was named Big Ten Coach of the Year.

In addition to Iowa, who received the conference's automatic bid to the NCAA tournament, the conference's tied the previous year's record with nine teams receiving bids to the tournament: Illinois, Indiana, Michigan, Michigan State, Ohio State, Purdue, Rutgers, and Wisconsin.

== Head coaches ==
=== Coaching changes ===
==== Indiana ====
On March 15, 2021, Indiana fired Archie Miller after four years as head basketball coach. Two weeks later, the school named former Indiana player and New York Knicks assistant Mike Woodson as the new head coach.

==== Minnesota ====
Following the season, Minnesota fired head coach Richard Pitino after eight years at the school. On March 23, the school named Minnesota alum and former Minnesota assistant coach Ben Johnson the new head coach.

==== Penn State ====
Shortly before the start of the 2020–21 season, Penn State head coach Pat Chambers resigned due to allegations of inappropriate conduct. The school named assistant coach Jim Ferry interim coach. Following the season, the school hired Purdue assistant coach Micah Shrewsberry as the new head coach.

==== Maryland ====
On December 3, 2021, Maryland and Mark Turgeon agreed to part ways effective immediately. Assistant coach Danny Manning was named interim coach.

=== Coaches ===
Team	Head coach	Previous job	Years at school	Overall record	Big Ten record	Big Ten titles	Big Ten tournament titles	NCAA tournaments	NCAA Final Fours	NCAA Championships
Illinois	Brad Underwood	Oklahoma State	5	71–56 (.559)	40–38 (.513)	0	1	1	0	0
Indiana	Mike Woodson	New York Knicks (Asst.)	1	0–0 (–)	0–0 (–)	0	0	0	0	0
Iowa	Fran McCaffery	Siena	12	218–152 (.589)	103–101 (.505)	0	0	5	0	0
Maryland	Mark Turgeon/Danny Manning*(interim)	Texas A&M/Maryland (interim) (Asst.)	11/1	221–113 (.662)	76–43 (.639)*	1	0	5	0	0
Michigan	Juwan Howard	Miami Heat (Asst.)	3	42–16 (.724)	24–13 (.649)	1	0	1	0	0
Michigan State	Tom Izzo	Michigan State (Asst.)	27	634–251 (.716)	299–132 (.694)	10	6	23	8	1
Minnesota	Ben Johnson	Xavier (Asst.)	1	0–0 (–)	0–0 (–)	0	0	0	0	0
Nebraska	Fred Hoiberg	Chicago Bulls	3	14–45 (.237)	5–34 (.128)	0	0	0	0	0
Northwestern	Chris Collins	Duke (Asst.)	9	118–134 (.468)	49–098 (.333)	0	0	1	0	0
Ohio State	Chris Holtmann	Butler	5	87–39 (.690)	34–24 (.586)	0	0	3	0	0
Penn State	Micah Shrewsberry	Purdue (Asst.)	1	0–0 (–)	0–0 (–)	0	0	0	0	0
Purdue	Matt Painter	Purdue (Assoc.)	17	355–184 (.659)	180–109 (.623)	3	1	12	0	0
Rutgers	Steve Pikiell	Stony Brook	6	70–78 (.473)	34–42 (.447)	0	0	1	0	0
Wisconsin	Greg Gard	Wisconsin (Assoc.)	7	119–70 (.630)	66–45 (.595)	1	0	4	0	0

Notes:

- All records, appearances, titles, etc. are from time with current school only.
- Year at school includes 2021–22 season.
- Overall and Big Ten records are from time at current school only and are through the beginning of the season.
- Turgeon's ACC conference record excluded since Maryland began Big Ten Conference play in 2014–15. Turgeon left Maryland on December 3, 2021.

== Preseason ==
=== Preseason Big Ten poll ===
Prior to the conference's annual media day, unofficial awards and a poll were chosen by a panel of writers.

Rank	Team
1	Michigan (13)
2	Purdue (12)
3	Illinois (3)
4	Ohio State
5	Maryland
6	Michigan State
7	Indiana
8	Rutgers
9	Iowa
10	Wisconsin
11	Nebraska
12T	Northwestern
12T	Penn State
14	Minnesota
(first place votes)

=== Preseason All-Big Ten ===
Prior to the conference's annual media day, unofficial awards and a poll were chosen by a panel of writers.

Honor	Recipient
Preseason Player of the Year	Kofi Cockburn, Illinois
Preseason All-Big Ten Team	Kofi Cockburn, Illinois
Preseason All-Big Ten Team	Hunter Dickinson, Michigan
Preseason All-Big Ten Team	Jaden Ivey, Purdue
Preseason All-Big Ten Team	EJ Liddell, Ohio State
Preseason All-Big Ten Team	Trayce Jackson-Davis, Indiana
Preseason Freshman of the Year	Caleb Houstan, Michigan

=== Preseason watchlists ===
Below is a table of notable preseason watch lists.

	Wooden	Naismith	Robertson	Cousy	West	Erving	Malone	Abdul-Jabbar
Eric Ayala, Maryland	✓				✓			
Eli Brooks, Michigan					✓			
Kofi Cockburn, Illinois	✓	✓						✓
Andre Curbelo, Illinois	✓	✓		✓				
Hunter Dickinson, Michigan	✓	✓						✓
Zach Edey, Purdue								✓
Ron Harper Jr., Rutgers	✓							
Caleb Houstan, Michigan	✓	✓				✓		
Jaden Ivey, Purdue	✓	✓			✓			
Trayce Jackson-Davis, Indiana	✓	✓					✓	
DeVante' Jones, Michigan				✓				
EJ Liddell, Ohio State	✓	✓					✓	
Donta Scott, Maryland							✓	
Justice Sueing, Ohio State						✓		
Trevion Williams, Purdue	✓	✓					✓	
Qudus Wahab, Maryland								✓

=== Preseason national polls ===
	AP	Athlon; Sports	Blue Ribbon; Yearbook	CBS Sports	Coaches	ESPN	Lindy's; Sports	Sporting News
Illinois	11	15	18	7	10	13	20	3
Indiana	RV			23	RV			
Iowa								
Maryland	21	19	22	22	21	20		22
Michigan	6	5	6	5	6	8	3	9
Michigan State	RV	24	21		RV		22	21
Minnesota								
Nebraska								
Northwestern								
Ohio State	17	14	20	18	17	19	17	16
Penn State								
Purdue	7	11	9	2	7	6	5	5
Rutgers	RV				RV			
Wisconsin								

== Regular season ==
=== 2021 ACC–Big Ten Challenge Big Ten 8–6 ===
Date	Time	ACC team	B1G team	Score	Location	Television	Attendance	Challenge leader
Nov 29	7:00 p.m.	Virginia	**Iowa**	74–75	John Paul Jones Arena • Charlottesville, Virginia	ESPN2	13,542	B1G 1–0
Nov 29	9:00 p.m.	Notre Dame	**Illinois**	72–82	State Farm Center • Champaign, Illinois	ESPN2	14,907	B1G 2–0
Nov 30	7:00 p.m.	**Syracuse**	Indiana	112–110^{2OT}	Carrier Dome • Syracuse, New York	ESPN2	21,330	B1G 2–1
Nov 30	7:00 p.m.	Pittsburgh	**Minnesota**	53–54	Petersen Events Center • Pittsburgh, Pennsylvania	ESPNU	7,736	B1G 3–1
Nov 30	7:30 p.m.	Florida State	No. 2 **Purdue**	65–93	Mackey Arena • West Lafayette, Indiana	ESPN	14,804	B1G 4–1
Nov 30	9:00 p.m.	Clemson	**Rutgers**	64–74	Jersey Mike's Arena • Piscataway, New Jersey	ESPN2	8,050	B1G 5–1
Nov 30	9:00 p.m.	**Wake Forest**	Northwestern	77–73 ^{OT}	LJVM Coliseum • Winston-Salem, North Carolina	ESPNU	3,711	B1G 5–2
Nov 30	9:30 p.m.	No. 1 Duke	**Ohio State**	66–71	Value City Arena • Columbus, Ohio	ESPN	18,809	B1G 6–2
Dec 1	7:15 p.m.	Louisville	No. 22 **Michigan State**	64–73	Breslin Center • East Lansing, Michigan	ESPN	14,797	B1G 7–2
Dec 1	7:15 p.m.	**Virginia Tech**	Maryland	62–58	Xfinity Center • College Park, Maryland	ESPN2	15,988	B1G 7–3
Dec 1	7:15 p.m.	**NC State**	Nebraska	104–100^{4OT}	PNC Arena • Raleigh, North Carolina	ESPNU	19,722	B1G 7–4
Dec 1	9:15 p.m.	**North Carolina**	No. 24 Michigan	72–51	Dean Smith Center • Chapel Hill, North Carolina	ESPN	19,938	B1G 7–5
Dec 1	9:15 p.m.	**Miami**	Penn State	63–58	Bryce Jordan Center • University Park, Pennsylvania	ESPNU	8,221	B1G 7–6
Dec 1	9:15 p.m.	Georgia Tech	No. 23 **Wisconsin**	66–70	McCamish Pavilion • Atlanta, Georgia	ESPN2	6,302	B1G 8–6
**Winners are in bold** Game times in EST; Boston College did not play due to the ACC having one more team than the B1G.

=== 2021 Gavitt Tipoff Games (Big East 6–2) ===
Date	Time	Big East team	Big Ten team	Score	Location	Television	Attendance	Leader
Mon., Nov. 15	7:00 PM	**Marquette**	No. 10 Illinois	67–66	Fiserv Forum • Milwaukee, WI	FS1	14,631	Big East (1–0)
Mon., Nov. 15	9:00 PM	**Providence**	Wisconsin	63–58	Kohl Center • Madison, WI	FS1	15,773	Big East (2–0)
Tue., Nov. 16	7:00 PM	**Creighton**	Nebraska	77–69	Pinnacle Bank Arena • Lincoln, NE	FS1	15,939	Big East (3–0)
Tue., Nov. 16	9:00 PM	**Seton Hall**	No. 4 Michigan	67–65	Crisler Center • Ann Arbor, MI	FS1	12,536	Big East (4–0)
Wed., Nov. 17	7:00 PM	Butler	**Michigan State**	73–52	Hinkle Fieldhouse • Indianapolis, IN	FS1	9,100	Big East (4–1)
Wed., Nov. 17	9:00 PM	St. John's	**Indiana**	76–74	Simon Skjodt Assembly Hall • Bloomington, IN	FS1	17,222	Big East (4–2)
Thu., Nov. 18	6:30 PM	**Xavier**	No. 19 Ohio State	71–65	Cintas Center • Cincinnati, OH	FS1	10,379	Big East (5–2)
Thu., Nov. 18	8:30 PM	**DePaul**	Rutgers	73–70	Wintrust Arena • Chicago, IL	FS1	2,844	Big East (6–2)
**WINNERS ARE IN BOLD**. Game Times in EST. Rankings from AP Poll. Did not participate: Connecticut, Georgetown, Villanova (Big East); Iowa, Maryland, Minnesota, Northwestern, Penn State, Purdue (Big Ten)

=== Rankings ===
Legend
	Improvement in ranking
	Drop in ranking
	Not ranked previous week
RV	Received votes but were not ranked in Top 25 of poll
(Italics)	Number of first place votes

		Pre/ Wk 1	Wk 2	Wk 3	Wk 4	Wk 5	Wk 6	Wk 7	Wk 8	Wk 9	Wk 10	Wk 11	Wk 12	Wk 13	Wk 14	Wk 15	Wk 16	Wk 17	Wk 18	Wk 19	Final
Illinois	AP	11	10	14	RV	RV	RV	RV	RV	RV	25	17	24	18	13	12	15	20	16	19	*
Illinois	C	10	10	15	RV	RV	RV	RV	RV	RV	24	17	21	18	13	12	14	17	15	16т	19
Indiana	AP	RV	RV	RV	RV	RV					RV	RV	RV	RV	RV					RV	*
Indiana	C	RV	RV	RV	RV	RV		RV			RV	RV	RV	RV	RV						
Iowa	AP				RV							RV	RV	RV	RV	RV	25	24	24	16	*
Iowa	C				RV							RV	RV	RV	RV	RV	RV	25т	23	19	21
Maryland	AP	21	20	RV																	*
Maryland	C	21	21	RV																	
Michigan	AP	6	4	20	24	RV	RV	RV	RV												*
Michigan	C	6	6	13	24	RV	NR	RV	RV												25
Michigan State	AP	RV	RV	RV	22	19	12	11	10	10	10	14	10	13	17	19	RV	RV		RV	*
Michigan State	C	RV	RV	RV	22	20	12	10	10	10	9	13	10	13	17	19	24	25т	RV	RV	RV
Minnesota	AP						RV	RV	RV	RV											*
Minnesota	C					RV	RV	RV	RV	RV											
Nebraska	AP																				*
Nebraska	C																				
Northwestern	AP																				*
Northwestern	C																				
Ohio State	AP	17	19	RV	RV	21	15	14	13	13	16	19	16	16	16	18	22	23	RV	RV	*
Ohio State	C	17	17	RV	RV	22	15	13	12	12	15	18	16	16	16	18	19	23	25	RV	RV
Penn State	AP																				*
Penn State	C																				
Purdue	AP	7	6	3	2 (9)	1 (61)	3	3	3	3	7	4	6	4	3	5	4	8	9т	10	*
Purdue	C	7	7	4	2 (10)	1 (29)	3	3	3	3	5	4	6	3	3	7	7	9	9	9	10
Rutgers	AP	RV	RV													RV	RV				*
Rutgers	C	RV	RV													RV	RV				RV
Wisconsin	AP				23	22	RV	24	24	23	13	8	11	11	14	15	13	10	12	14	*
Wisconsin	C				21	17	RV	24	23	23	13	8	11	11	14	16	12	10	12	14	18

- AP does not release a post-tournament poll.

=== Early season tournaments ===
Of the 14 Big Ten teams, 10 participated in early season tournaments. All Big Ten teams participated in the ACC–Big Ten Challenge against Atlantic Coast Conference teams, the 21st year for the event. Eight teams participated in the Gavitt Tipoff Games.

Team	Tournament	Finish
Illinois	Hall of Fame Classic	3rd
Maryland	Baha Mar Hoops Bahamas Championship	2nd
Michigan	Roman Main Event	2nd
Michigan State	Battle 4 Atlantis	2nd
Minnesota	Asheville Championship	1st
Northwestern	Legends Classic	3rd
Ohio State	Fort Myers Tip-Off	2nd
Penn State	Emerald Coast Classic	3rd
Purdue	Hall of Fame Tip Off	1st
Wisconsin	Maui Invitational Tournament	1st

=== Players of the week ===
Throughout the conference regular season, the Big Ten offices named one or two players of the week and one or two freshmen of the week each Monday.

Week	Player of the week	Freshman of the week
November 15, 2021	Trayce Jackson-Davis, Indiana	Bryce McGowens, Nebraska
November 22, 2021	Keegan Murray, Iowa	Caleb Furst, Purdue
November 22, 2021	Trevion Williams, Purdue	Caleb Furst, Purdue
November 29, 2021	Johnny Davis, Wisconsin	Bryce McGowens (2), Nebraska
December 6, 2021	Brad Davison, Wisconsin	Max Christie, Michigan State
December 6, 2021	Payton Willis, Minnesota	Chucky Hepburn, Wisconsin
December 13, 2021	E. J. Liddell, Ohio State	Max Christie (2), Michigan State
December 13, 2021	Trevion Williams (2), Purdue	Max Christie (2), Michigan State
December 20, 2021	Keegan Murray (2), Iowa	Kobe Bufkin, Michigan
December 20, 2021	Keegan Murray (2), Iowa	Bryce McGowens (3), Nebraska
December 27, 2021	Kofi Cockburn, Illinois	Max Christie (3), Michigan State
January 3, 2022	Keegan Murray (3), Iowa	Malaki Branham, Ohio State
January 10, 2022	Kofi Cockburn (2), Illinois	Max Christie (4), Michigan State
January 10, 2022	Johnny Davis (2), Wisconsin	Malaki Branham (2), Ohio State
January 17, 2022	Trent Frazier, Illinois	Max Christie (5), Michigan State
January 24, 2022	Payton Willis, Minnesota	Caleb Houstan, Michigan
January 24, 2022	Hunter Dickinson, Michigan	Caleb Houstan, Michigan
January 31, 2022	Jaden Ivey, Purdue	Bryce McGowens (4), Nebraska
February 7, 2022	Kofi Cockburn (3), Illinois	Bryce McGowens (5), Nebraska
February 14, 2022	Geo Baker, Rutgers	Byrce McGowens (6), Nebraska
February 14, 2022	Keegan Murray (4), Iowa	Byrce McGowens (6), Nebraska
February 21, 2022	Johnny Davis (3), Wisconsin	Bryce McGowens (7), Nebraska
February 28, 2022	Keegan Murray (5), Iowa	Malaki Branham (3), Ohio State
March 7, 2022	Keegan Murray (6), Iowa	Byrce McGowens (8), Nebraska
March 7, 2022	Alonzo Verge Jr., Nebraska	Byrce McGowens (8), Nebraska

=== Conference matrix ===
This table summarizes the head-to-head results between teams in conference play. Each team will play 20 conference games, and at least one game against each opponent.

	Illinois	Indiana	Iowa	Maryland	Michigan	Michigan St	Minnesota	Nebraska	Northwestern	Ohio St	Penn St	Purdue	Rutgers	Wisconsin
vs. Illinois	–	0–1	0–2	1–1	0–2	0–2	0–1	0–1	0–2	1–0	0–1	2–0	1–1	0–1
vs. Indiana	1–0	–	1–0	0–2	1–0	1–0	0–2	0–1	1–0	1–1	1–1	1–1	1–0	2–0
vs. Iowa	2–0	0–1	–	0–2	1–1	0–1	0–2	0–2	0–1	0–1	1–1	2–0	1–0	1–0
vs. Maryland	1–1	2–0	2–0	–	1–0	2–0	0–1	0–1	1–1	1–1	0–1	1–0	1–1	1–0
vs. Michigan	2–0	0–1	1–1	0–1	–	1–1	1–0	0–2	0–1	1–1	0–1	1–1	1–1	1–0
vs. Michigan St	2–0	0–1	1–0	0–2	1–1	–	0–2	0–1	1–1	1–0	1–1	0–1	1–0	1–1
vs. Minnesota	1–0	2–0	2–0	1–0	0–1	2–0	–	1–0	1–1	2–0	1–1	1–0	0–1	2–0
vs. Nebraska	1–0	1–0	2–0	1–0	2–0	1–0	0–1	–	2–0	1–1	0–2	1–0	2–0	1–1
vs. Northwestern	2–0	1–1	1–0	1–1	1–0	1–1	1–1	0–2	–	1–0	2–0	2–0	0–1	1–0
vs. Ohio State	0–1	1–1	1–0	1–1	1–1	0–1	0–2	1–1	0–1	–	0–2	1–0	1–0	1–1
vs. Penn State	1–0	1–1	1–1	1–0	1–0	1–1	1–1	1–1	0–2	2–0	–	1–0	1–1	1–0
vs. Purdue	0–2	1–1	0–2	0–0	1–1	1–0	0–1	0–1	0–2	0–1	0–1	–	1–1	2–0
vs. Rutgers	1–1	0–1	0–1	1–1	1–1	0–1	1–0	0–2	1–0	0–1	1–0	1–1	–	1–1
vs. Wisconsin	1–0	0–2	0–1	0–2	0–1	1–1	0–2	1–1	0–1	1–1	0–1	0–2	1–1	–
Total	**15–5**	**9–11**	**12–8**	**7–13**	**11–9**	**11–9**	**4–16**	**4–16**	**7–13**	**12–8**	**7–13**	**14–6**	**12–8**	**15–5**

)

The Big Ten Conference led the nation in average attendance. It post-COVID average attendance of 12,520 outpaced the Big 12 (10,602), SEC (10,557), ACC (9,659) and Big East (9,056). Wisconsin (7th, 16,505), Indiana (9th, 15,845), Nebraska (10th, 15,283), Purdue (11th, 14,804), Michigan State (12th, 14,797), Illinois (13th, 14,690), Ohio State (20th, 13,276), Maryland (22nd, 13,052), Iowa (27th, 12,105) and Michigan (28th, 11,953) were among the top 30 of the 350 schools that compete in Division I basketball.

== Honors and awards ==
=== All-Big Ten awards and teams ===
On March 8, 2022, the Big Ten announced most of its conference awards.

Honor	Coaches	Media
Player of the Year	Johnny Davis, Wisconsin	Johnny Davis, Wisconsin
Coach of the Year	Greg Gard, Wisconsin	Greg Gard, Wisconsin
Freshman of the Year	Malaki Branham, Ohio State	Malaki Branham, Ohio State
Defensive Player of the Year	Caleb McConnell, Rutgers	Not Selected
Sixth Man of the Year	Trevion Williams, Purdue	Not Selected
All-Big Ten First Team	Kofi Cockburn, Illinois	Kofi Cockburn, Illinois
All-Big Ten First Team	Johnny Davis, Wisconsin	Johnny Davis, Wisconsin
All-Big Ten First Team	Jaden Ivey, Purdue	Jaden Ivey, Purdue
All-Big Ten First Team	E. J. Liddell, Ohio State	E. J. Liddell, Ohio State
All-Big Ten First Team	Keegan Murray, Iowa	Keegan Murray, Iowa
All-Big Ten Second Team	Brad Davison, Wisconsin	Hunter Dickinson, Michigan
All-Big Ten Second Team	Hunter Dickinson, Michigan	Zach Edey, Purdue
All-Big Ten Second Team	Zach Edey, Purdue	Trent Frazier, Illinois
All-Big Ten Second Team	Trent Frazier, Illinois	Ron Harper Jr., Rutgers
All-Big Ten Second Team	Ron Harper Jr., Rutgers	Trayce Jackson-Davis, Indiana
All-Big Ten Second Team	Trayce Jackson-Davis, Indiana	Not Selected
All-Big Ten Third Team	Geo Baker, Rutgers	Malaki Branham, Ohio State
All-Big Ten Third Team	Malaki Branham, Ohio State	Brad Davison, Wisconsin
All-Big Ten Third Team	Gabe Brown, Michigan State	Bryce McGowens, Nebraska
All-Big Ten Third Team	Bryce McGowens, Nebraska	Alfonso Plummer, Illinois
All-Big Ten Third Team	Alfonso Plummer, Illinois	Trevion Williams, Purdue
All-Big Ten Third Team	Trevion Williams, Purdue	Not Selected
All-Big Ten Honorable Mention	Jamison Battle, Minnesota	Eric Ayala, Maryland
All-Big Ten Honorable Mention	Jordan Bohannon, Iowa	Geo Baker, Rutgers
All-Big Ten Honorable Mention	Malik Hall, Michigan State	Jamison Battle, Minnesota
All-Big Ten Honorable Mention	John Harrar, Penn State	Jordan Bohannon, Iowa
All-Big Ten Honorable Mention	Fatts Russell, Maryland	Eli Brooks, Michigan
All-Big Ten Honorable Mention	Sasha Stefanovic, Purdue	Gabe Brown, Michigan State
All-Big Ten Honorable Mention	Tyler Wahl, Wisconsin	John Harrar, Penn State
All-Big Ten Honorable Mention	Payton Willis, Minnesota	Xavier Johnson, Indiana
All-Big Ten Honorable Mention	Not Selected	Paul Mulcahy, Rutgers
All-Big Ten Honorable Mention	Not Selected	Clifford Omoruyi, Rutgers
All-Big Ten Honorable Mention	Not Selected	Fatts Russell, Maryland
All-Big Ten Honorable Mention	Not Selected	Sasha Stefanovic, Purdue
All-Big Ten Honorable Mention	Not Selected	Race Thompson, Indiana
All-Big Ten Honorable Mention	Not Selected	Tyler Wahl, Wisconsin
All-Big Ten Honorable Mention	Not Selected	Payton Willis, Minnesota
All-Freshman Team	Malaki Branham, Ohio State	Not Selected
All-Freshman Team	Max Christie, Michigan State	Not Selected
All-Freshman Team	Moussa Diabaté, Michigan	Not Selected
All-Freshman Team	Chucky Hepburn, Wisconsin	Not Selected
All-Freshman Team	Bryce McGowens, Nebraska	Not Selected
All-Defensive Team	Trent Frazier, Illinois	Not Selected
All-Defensive Team	Eric Hunter Jr., Purdue	Not Selected
All-Defensive Team	Trayce Jackson-Davis, Indiana	Not Selected
All-Defensive Team	E. J. Liddell, Ohio State	Not Selected
All-Defensive Team	Caleb McConnell, Rutgers	Not Selected

== Postseason ==
=== Big Ten tournament ===
First round Wednesday, March 9 BTN/Fox Sports App
12	Northwestern	71
13	Nebraska	69
11	Penn State	60
14	Minnesota	51

Second round Thursday, March 10; BTN/Fox Sports App
8	Michigan	69
9	Indiana	74
5	Iowa	112
12	Northwestern	76
7	Michigan State	76
10	Maryland	72
6	Ohio State	68
11	Penn State	71

Quarterfinals; Friday, March 11; BTN/Fox Sports App
1	Illinois	63
9	Indiana	65
4	Rutgers	74
5	Iowa	84
2	Wisconsin	63
7	Michigan State	69
3	Purdue	69
11	Penn State	61

Semifinals; Saturday, March 12; CBS/Paramount+
9	Indiana	77
5	Iowa	80
7	Michigan State	70
3	Purdue	75

Championship; Sunday, March 13; CBS/Paramount+
5	Iowa	75
3	Purdue	66

=== NCAA Tournament ===
The winner of the Big Ten Tournament, Iowa, received the conference's automatic bid to the NCAA tournament. Nine Big Ten teams received bids to the NCAA tournament for the second consecutive year, the most of any conference in the tournament.

Seed	Region	School	First Four	First round	Second round	Sweet Sixteen	Elite Eight	Final Four	Championship
3	Midwest	Wisconsin	N/A	defeated (14) Colgate 67–60	lost to (11) Iowa State 49–54				
3	East	Purdue	N/A	defeated (14) Yale 78–56	defeated (6) Texas 81–71	lost to (15) Saint Peter's 64–67			
4	South	Illinois	N/A	defeated (13) Chattanooga 54–53	lost to (5) Houston 53–68				
5	Midwest	Iowa	N/A	lost to (12) Richmond 63–67					
7	South	Ohio State	N/A	defeated (10) Loyola Chicago 54–41	lost to (2) Villanova 61–71				
7	West	Michigan State	N/A	defeated (10) Davidson 74–73	lost to (2) Duke 76–85				
11	South	Michigan	N/A	defeated (6) Colorado State 75–63	defeated (3) Tennessee 76–68	lost to (2) Villanova 55–63			
11	West	Rutgers	lost to (11) Notre Dame 87–89^{2OT}						
12	East	Indiana	defeated (12) Wyoming 66–58	lost to (5) Saint Mary's 53–82					
		W–L (%):	1–1 (.500)	6–2 (.750)	2–4 (.333)	0–2 (.000)	0–0 (–)	0–0 (–)	0–0 (–) Total: 9–9 (.500)

=== 2022 NBA draft ===
Nine Big Ten athletes were selected in the 2022 NBA draft, which was the most by any conference, and the most from the Big Ten since the 1990 NBA draft.

Rnd.	Pick	Player	Pos.	Nationality (Note: Nationality indicates the player's national team or representative nationality. If a player has not competed at the international level, then the nationality indicates the national team which the player is eligible to represent according to FIBA rules.)	Team	School / club team
1	4	Keegan Murray	PF	United States	Sacramento Kings	Iowa (So.)
1	5	Jaden Ivey	PG/SG	United States	Detroit Pistons	Purdue (So.)
1	10	Johnny Davis	SG	United States	Washington Wizards	Wisconsin (So.)
1	20	Malaki Branham	SG	United States	San Antonio Spurs (from Toronto) (Note: February 10, 2022: Toronto Raptors to San Antonio Spurs: San Antonio acquired Goran Dragić and a 2022 first-round draft pick; Toronto acquired Thaddeus Young and Drew Eubanks and a 2022 second-round draft pick)	Ohio State (Fr.)
2	32	Caleb Houstan	SF	Canada	Orlando Magic	Michigan (Fr.)
2	35	Max Christie	SG	United States	Los Angeles Lakers (from Indiana via Milwaukee to Orlando (Note: July 6, 2019: Indiana Pacers to Milwaukee Bucks: Milwaukee acquired a lottery protected 2020 first-round pick, a future protected second-round pick, and a 2025 second-round pick; Indiana acquired Malcolm Brogdon via sign and trade; November 18, 2020: Milwaukee Bucks to Orlando Magic: Orlando acquired 2022 and 2026 second-round picks; Milwaukee acquired a 2020 second-round selection; June 23, 2022: Orlando Magic to Los Angeles Lakers: LA Lakers acquired 35th pick in 2022 draft; Orlando acquired a 2028 second-round pick and cash considerations))	Michigan State (Fr.)
2	40	Bryce McGowens	SG	United States	Minnesota Timberwolves (from Washington via Cleveland (Note: December 7, 2018: Milwaukee Bucks to Cleveland Cavaliers (three-team trade with the Washington Wizards): Cleveland acquired Matthew Dellavedova, John Henson, 2021 and 2022 second-round picks, and a conditional first-round pick; Milwaukee acquired George Hill, Jason Smith, a 2020 second-round pick, Washington's 2021 second-round pick, and cash considerations; Washington acquired Sam Dekker and a conditional 2020 second-round pick) (Note: August 2, 2021: Cleveland Cavaliers to Minnesota Timberwolves: Minnesota acquired Taurean Prince, and a 2022 second-round pick; Cleveland acquired Ricky Rubio), traded to Charlotte (Note: June 23, 2022: Charlotte Hornets to Minnesota Timberwolves: Charlotte acquired the draft rights to Bryce McGowens; Minnesota acquired the draft rights to Josh Minott and a 2023 second-round draft pick (from New York)))	Nebraska (Fr.)
2	41	E. J. Liddell	PF	United States	New Orleans Pelicans	Ohio State (Jr.)
2	43	Moussa Diabaté	PF	France	Los Angeles Clippers	Michigan (Fr.)

==== Pre-draft trades ====
Prior to the draft, the following trades were made and resulted in exchanges of draft picks between teams.

==== Draft-night trades ====
Draft-night trades are made after the draft begins. These trades are usually not confirmed until the next day or after free agency officially begins.
