= 2023–24 Purdue Boilermakers men's basketball team =

American college basketball season

2023–24 Purdue Boilermakers men's basketball

NCAA tournament, Runner-up Maui Invitational champions Big Ten regular season champions

National Championship Game, L 60–75 vs. Connecticut
- Conference: Big Ten Conference

Ranking
- Coaches: No. 2
- AP: No. 2
- Record: 34–5 (17–3 Big Ten)
- Head coach: Matt Painter (19th season)
- Assistant coaches: Brandon Brantley (11th season); Terry Johnson (3rd season); Paul Lusk (3rd season)
- Home arena: Mackey Arena

2023–24 Big Ten Conference men's basketball standings
| | Conf. | | | | Overall |
| Team | W | | L | PCT | W | | L | PCT |
|---|---|---|---|---|---|---|---|---|
| No. 2 Purdue | 17 | – | 3 | .850 | 34 | – | 5 | .872 |
| No. 6 Illinois † | 14 | – | 6 | .700 | 29 | – | 9 | .763 |
| Nebraska | 12 | – | 8 | .600 | 23 | – | 11 | .676 |
| Northwestern | 12 | – | 8 | .600 | 22 | – | 12 | .647 |
| Wisconsin | 11 | – | 9 | .550 | 22 | – | 14 | .611 |
| Indiana | 10 | – | 10 | .500 | 19 | – | 14 | .576 |
| Iowa | 10 | – | 10 | .500 | 19 | – | 15 | .559 |
| Michigan State | 10 | – | 10 | .500 | 20 | – | 15 | .571 |
| Minnesota | 9 | – | 11 | .450 | 19 | – | 15 | .559 |
| Ohio State | 9 | – | 11 | .450 | 22 | – | 14 | .611 |
| Penn State | 9 | – | 11 | .450 | 16 | – | 17 | .485 |
| Maryland | 7 | – | 13 | .350 | 16 | – | 17 | .485 |
| Rutgers | 7 | – | 13 | .350 | 15 | – | 17 | .469 |
| Michigan | 3 | – | 17 | .150 | 8 | – | 24 | .250 |
† 2024 Big Ten tournament winner Rankings from AP poll

The 2023–24 Purdue Boilermakers men's basketball team represented Purdue University in the 2023–24 NCAA Division I men's basketball season. Their head coach was Matt Painter, who was in his 19th season with the Boilermakers. The Boilermakers played their home games at Mackey Arena in West Lafayette, Indiana as members of the Big Ten Conference. The Purdue Boilermakers men's basketball team drew an average home attendance of 14,876 in 16 games in 2023–24.

With their win over Michigan State on March 2, 2024, Purdue clinched a share of their 26th Big Ten regular season championship. Three days later, the Boilermakers clinched the Big Ten title outright for the second consecutive year with their victory over Illinois. The team finished the season 34–5, 17–3 in Big Ten play. They defeated Michigan State in the quarterfinals of the Big Ten tournament before losing to Wisconsin in the semifinals. They received an at-large bid to the NCAA tournament as the No. 1 seed in the Midwest region. It marked the second consecutive year as a No. 1 seed. They defeated Grambling State and Utah State to break the school record of most wins in a season. They defeated Gonzaga in the Sweet Sixteen and defeated Tennessee in the Elite Eight to return to the Final Four for the first time since 1980. In the Final Four, they defeated NC State to advance to the National Championship game, their first since 1969, where they lost to No. 1 overall seed UConn.

The season saw several new program records. In addition to most wins in a season, Purdue set school records in points (3,211), rebound margin (+11.2), assists (720), assist / turnover ratio (1.63), field goals made (1,109), free throws made (675), and free throws attempted (938). Senior Zach Edey became the first Purdue player to win multiple Consensus National Player of the Year awards, and passed Purdue legends Joe Barry Carroll in rebounding (1,321) and Rick Mount in scoring (2,516) to become Purdue's all-time leader in both categories. Sophomore Braden Smith additionally set a Purdue and Big Ten single-season record for assists (292).

== Previous season ==
The Boilermakers finished the 2022–23 season 29–6, 15–5 in Big Ten play. With Northwestern's loss to Maryland on February 26, 2023, Purdue clinched a share of the Big Ten regular season championship. With Michigan's loss to Illinois on March 2, Purdue clinched the outright regular season championship, its first outright championship since 2017. The championship marked the school's 25th, the most in Big Ten history. In the Big Ten tournament, they defeated Rutgers, Ohio State, and Penn State to win the tournament championship, the school's second. As a result, they received the conference's automatic bid to the NCAA tournament as the No. 1 seed in the East region. In the first round of the tournament they were upset by Farleigh Dickinson, becoming the second men's No. 1 seed to lose to a No. 16 seed ever, following Virginia's 2018 loss to UMBC.

== Offseason ==
=== Departures ===
| Name | Number | Pos. | Height | Weight | Year | Hometown | Reason for departure |
|---|---|---|---|---|---|---|---|
| Brandon Newman | 5 | G | 6'5" | 200 | RS Junior | Valparaiso, IN | Transferred to Western Kentucky |
| David Jenkins Jr. | 14 | G | 6'1" | 200 | Senior | Tacoma, WA | Graduated |
| Matt Frost | 21 | F | 6'5" | 200 | Senior | Columbus, IN | Walk-on; graduated |

=== Incoming transfers ===
| Name | Number | Pos. | Height | Weight | Year | Hometown | Previous school |
|---|---|---|---|---|---|---|---|
| Lance Jones | 55 | G | 6'1" | 200 | GS Senior | Evanston, IL | Southern Illinois |

=== Recruiting classes ===
==== 2023 recruiting class ====
College recruiting information
| Name | Hometown | School | Height | Weight | Commit date |
|---|---|---|---|---|---|
| Myles Colvin; SG | Indianapolis, IN | Heritage Christian School (IN) | 6 ft 4 in (1.93 m) | 180 lb (82 kg) | Jul 7, 2021 |
| Myles Colvin; SG | Recruit ratings: Rivals: 247Sports: ESPN: (82) | | | | |
Overall recruit ranking: Rivals: — 247Sports: 34 ESPN: —
Note: In many cases, Scout, Rivals, 247Sports, On3, and ESPN may conflict in their listings of height and weight.; In these cases, the average was taken. ESPN grades are on a 100-point scale.; Sources: "Purdue 2023 Basketball Commitments". Rivals.; "2023 Purdue Boilermakers Recruiting Class". ESPN.; "2023 Team Ranking". Rivals.; "2023–24 Purdue Boilermakers men's basketball team". 247Sports.

==== 2024 recruiting class ====
College recruiting information (2024)
| Name | Hometown | School | Height | Weight | Commit date |
|---|---|---|---|---|---|
| Raleigh Burgess #16 C | Cincinnati, OH | Sycamore High School | 6 ft 8 in (2.03 m) | 220 lb (100 kg) | May 1, 2022 |
| Raleigh Burgess #16 C | Recruit ratings: Rivals: 247Sports: ESPN: (81) | | | | |
| Jack Benter; SG | Brownstown, IN | Brownstown Central High School | 6 ft 5 in (1.96 m) | 180 lb (82 kg) | Jul 14, 2022 |
| Jack Benter; SG | Recruit ratings: Rivals: 247Sports: ESPN: (75) | | | | |
| CJ Cox; CG | Milton, MA | Milton Academy | 6 ft 2 in (1.88 m) | 175 lb (79 kg) | Oct 1, 2023 |
| CJ Cox; CG | Recruit ratings: Rivals: 247Sports: ESPN: (78) | | | | |
| Daniel Jacobsen; C | Wolfeboro, NH | Brewster Academy | 7 ft 2 in (2.18 m) | 235 lb (107 kg) | Nov 3, 2023 |
| Daniel Jacobsen; C | Recruit ratings: Rivals: 247Sports: ESPN: (80) | | | | |
| Gicarri Harris; CG | Loganville, GA | Grayson High School | 6 ft 3 in (1.91 m) | 170 lb (77 kg) | Nov 15, 2023 |
| Gicarri Harris; CG | Recruit ratings: Rivals: 247Sports: ESPN: (83) | | | | |
Overall recruit ranking: Rivals: — 247Sports: 10 ESPN: —
Note: In many cases, Scout, Rivals, 247Sports, On3, and ESPN may conflict in their listings of height and weight.; In these cases, the average was taken. ESPN grades are on a 100-point scale.; Sources: "Purdue 2024 Basketball Commitments". Rivals.; "2024 Purdue Boilermakers Recruiting Class". ESPN.; "2024 Team Ranking". Rivals.; "2023–24 Purdue Boilermakers men's basketball team". 247Sports.

== Roster ==
2023–24 Purdue Boilermakers men's basketball team
Players
Coaches

| Pos. | # | Name | Height | Weight | Year | Previous school | Hometown |
|---|---|---|---|---|---|---|---|
| F | 0 | Mason Gillis | 6 ft 6 in (1.98 m) | 225 lb (102 kg) | RS Sr | New Castle HS | New Castle, IN |
| F | 1 | Caleb Furst | 6 ft 10 in (2.08 m) | 225 lb (102 kg) | Jr | Blackhawk Christian School | Fort Wayne, IN |
| G | 2 | Fletcher Loyer | 6 ft 4 in (1.93 m) | 180 lb (82 kg) | So | Homestead HS | Fort Wayne, IN |
| G | 3 | Braden Smith | 6 ft 0 in (1.83 m) | 175 lb (79 kg) | So | Westfield HS | Westfield, IN |
| F | 4 | Trey Kaufman-Renn | 6 ft 9 in (2.06 m) | 230 lb (104 kg) | RS So | Silver Creek HS | Sellersburg, IN |
| G | 5 | Myles Colvin | 6 ft 5 in (1.96 m) | 200 lb (91 kg) | Fr | Heritage Christian | Indianapolis, IN |
| F | 11 | Brian Waddell | 6 ft 8 in (2.03 m) | 190 lb (86 kg) | RS So | Carmel HS | Carmel, IN |
| C | 15 | Zach Edey | 7 ft 4 in (2.24 m) | 300 lb (136 kg) | Sr | IMG Academy | Toronto, ON |
| F | 20 | Josh Furst (W) | 6 ft 6 in (1.98 m) | 200 lb (91 kg) | Fr | Blackhawk Christian | Fort Wayne, IN |
| G | 22 | Chase Martin (W) | 6 ft 2 in (1.88 m) | 180 lb (82 kg) | Sr | Tolton HS | Columbia, MO |
| F | 23 | Camden Heide | 6 ft 7 in (2.01 m) | 205 lb (93 kg) | RS Fr | Wasatch Academy | Wayzata, MN |
| F | 24 | Sam King | 6 ft 8 in (2.03 m) | 220 lb (100 kg) | So | Columbus North HS | Columbus, IN |
| G | 25 | Ethan Morton | 6 ft 7 in (2.01 m) | 215 lb (98 kg) | Sr | Butler Area HS | Butler, PA |
| G | 32 | Jace Rayl (W) | 5 ft 11 in (1.8 m) | 170 lb (77 kg) | Fr | Kokomo HS | Kokomo, IN |
| G | 34 | Carson Barrett (W) | 6 ft 5 in (1.96 m) | 210 lb (95 kg) | Sr | Lafayette Central Catholic HS | Lafayette, IN |
| C | 44 | Will Berg | 7 ft 2 in (2.18 m) | 255 lb (116 kg) | RS Fr | Riksbasketgymnasiet Luleå | Stockholm, Sweden |
| G | 55 | Lance Jones | 6 ft 1 in (1.85 m) | 200 lb (91 kg) | GS | Southern Illinois | Evanston, IL |

Head coach

- Matt Painter (Purdue)

Assistant coach(es)

- Brandon Brantley (Purdue)
- Terry Johnson (Purdue Fort Wayne)
- Paul Lusk (Southern Illinois)

Legend

- (C) Team captain
- (S) Suspended
- (I) Ineligible
- (W) Walk-on
- Injured
- Current redshirt

Roster

== Schedule and results ==
| Date time, TV | Rank^{#} | Opponent^{#} | Result | Record | High points | High rebounds | High assists | Site (attendance) city, state |
Exhibition
| October 28, 2023*; 4:00 p.m., SECN | No. 3 | at No. 14 Arkansas; Charity exhibition | L 77–81 ^{OT} | − | 15 – Tied | 9 – Edey | 4 – Smith | Bud Walton Arena (19,200); Fayetteville, AR |
| November 1, 2023*; 7:00 p.m., BTN Plus | No. 3 | Grace College | W 98–51 | – | 19 – Edey | 9 – Edey | 6 – Smith | Mackey Arena (14,876); West Lafayette, IN |
Regular season
| November 6, 2023*; 6:30 p.m., BTN | No. 3 | Samford | W 98–45 | 1–0 | 16 – Edey | 11 – Edey | 7 – Smith | Mackey Arena (14,876); West Lafayette, IN |
| November 10, 2023*; 7:00 p.m., BTN Plus | No. 3 | Morehead State | W 87–57 | 2–0 | 18 – Edey | 8 – Tied | 11 – Smith | Mackey Arena (14,876); West Lafayette, IN |
| November 13, 2023*; 8:30 p.m., FS1 | No. 2 | Xavier; Gavitt Tipoff Games | W 83–71 | 3–0 | 28 – Edey | 11 – Edey | 7 – Smith | Mackey Arena (14,876); West Lafayette, IN |
| November 20, 2023*; 5:00 p.m., ESPN2 | No. 2 | vs. No. 11 Gonzaga; Maui Invitational Quarterfinals | W 73–63 | 4–0 | 25 – Edey | 14 – Edey | 5 – Smith | Stan Sheriff Center (4,838); Honolulu, HI |
| November 21, 2023*; 8:00 p.m., ESPN | No. 2 | vs. No. 7 Tennessee; Maui Invitational Semifinals | W 71–67 | 5–0 | 27 – Loyer | 10 – Edey | 2 – Tied | Stan Sheriff Center (–); Honolulu, HI |
| November 22, 2023*; 5:00 p.m., ESPN | No. 2 | vs. No. 4 Marquette; Maui Invitational Championship | W 78–75 | 6–0 | 28 – Edey | 15 – Edey | 5 – Smith | Stan Sheriff Center (5,164); Honolulu, HI |
| November 28, 2023*; 8:30 p.m., BTN | No. 1 | Texas Southern | W 99–67 | 7–0 | 19 – Smith | 9 – Smith | 10 – Smith | Mackey Arena (14,876); West Lafayette, IN |
| December 1, 2023; 9:00 p.m., BTN | No. 1 | at Northwestern | L 88–92 ^{OT} | 7–1 (0–1) | 35 – Edey | 14 – Edey | 9 – Smith | Welsh–Ryan Arena (7,039); Evanston, IL |
| December 4, 2023; 7:00 p.m., BTN | No. 4 | Iowa | W 87–68 | 8–1 (1–1) | 25 – Edey | 12 – Edey | 8 – Smith | Mackey Arena (14,876); West Lafayette, IN |
| December 9, 2023*; 1:30 p.m., FOX | No. 4 | vs. Alabama; Basketball Hall of Fame Series Toronto | W 92–86 | 9–1 | 35 – Edey | 7 – Edey | 8 – Smith | Coca-Cola Coliseum (3,828); Toronto, ON |
| December 16, 2023*; 4:30 p.m., Peacock | No. 3 | vs. No. 1 Arizona; Indy Classic | W 92–84 | 10–1 | 27 – Loyer | 9 – Edey | 5 – Edey | Gainbridge Fieldhouse (17,315); Indianapolis, IN |
| December 21, 2023*; 6:30 p.m., BTN | No. 1 | Jacksonville | W 100–57 | 11–1 | 18 – Edey | 8 – Edey | 6 – Smith | Mackey Arena (14,876); West Lafayette, IN |
| December 29, 2023*; 7:00 p.m., BTN | No. 1 | Eastern Kentucky | W 80–53 | 12–1 | 14 – Loyer | 9 – Gillis | 8 – Smith | Mackey Arena (14,876); West Lafayette, IN |
| January 2, 2024; 7:00 p.m., Peacock | No. 1 | at Maryland | W 67–53 | 13–1 (2–1) | 23 – Edey | 12 – Edey | 6 – Smith | Xfinity Center (14,314); College Park, MD |
| January 5, 2024; 8:30 p.m., FS1 | No. 1 | No. 9 Illinois | W 83–78 | 14–1 (3–1) | 23 – Kaufman-Renn | 15 – Edey | 6 – Smith | Mackey Arena (14,876); West Lafayette, IN |
| January 9, 2024; 9:00 p.m., Peacock | No. 1 | at Nebraska | L 72–88 | 14–2 (3–2) | 16 – Gillis | 7 – Edey | 7 – Smith | Pinnacle Bank Arena (14,106); Lincoln, NE |
| January 13, 2024; 2:15 p.m., BTN | No. 1 | Penn State | W 95–78 | 15–2 (4–2) | 30 – Edey | 20 – Edey | 11 – Smith | Mackey Arena (14,876); West Lafayette, IN |
| January 16, 2024; 7:00 p.m., Peacock | No. 2 | at Indiana; Rivalry/Indiana National Guard Governor's Cup | W 87–66 | 16–2 (5–2) | 33 – Edey | 14 – Edey | 9 – Smith | Simon Skjodt Assembly Hall (17,222); Bloomington, IN |
| January 20, 2024; 2:00 p.m., FS1 | No. 2 | at Iowa | W 84–70 | 17–2 (6–2) | 30 – Edey | 18 – Edey | 9 – Smith | Carver–Hawkeye Arena (14,232); Iowa City, IA |
| January 23, 2024; 9:00 p.m., Peacock | No. 2 | Michigan | W 99–67 | 18–2 (7–2) | 24 – Jones | 10 – Edey | 10 – Smith | Mackey Arena (14,876); West Lafayette, IN |
| January 28, 2024; 1:00 p.m., FOX | No. 2 | at Rutgers | W 68–60 | 19–2 (8–2) | 26 – Edey | 12 – Edey | 8 – Jones | Jersey Mike's Arena (8,000); Piscataway, NJ |
| January 31, 2024; 6:30 p.m., BTN | No. 2 | Northwestern | W 105–96 ^{OT} | 20–2 (9–2) | 30 – Edey | 15 – Edey | 16 – Smith | Mackey Arena (14,876); West Lafayette, IN |
| February 4, 2024; 1:00 p.m., CBS | No. 2 | at No. 6 Wisconsin | W 75–69 | 21–2 (10–2) | 20 – Jones | 13 – Edey | 3 – Tied | Kohl Center (17,071); Madison, WI |
| February 10, 2024; 8:00 p.m., FOX | No. 2 | Indiana; Rivalry/Indiana National Guard Governor's Cup | W 79–59 | 22–2 (11–2) | 26 – Edey | 13 – Edey | 4 – Edey | Mackey Arena (14,876); West Lafayette, IN |
| February 15, 2024; 8:30 p.m., BTN | No. 2 | Minnesota | W 84–76 | 23–2 (12–2) | 24 – Edey | 15 – Edey | 9 – Smith | Mackey Arena (14,876); West Lafayette, IN |
| February 18, 2024; 1:00 p.m., CBS | No. 2 | at Ohio State | L 69–73 | 23–3 (12–3) | 22 – Edey | 13 – Edey | 7 – Smith | Value City Arena (18,353); Columbus, OH |
| February 22, 2024; 7:00 p.m., FS1 | No. 3 | Rutgers | W 96–68 | 24–3 (13–3) | 25 – Edey | 7 – Tied | 5 – Tied | Mackey Arena (14,876); West Lafayette, IN |
| February 25, 2024; 2:00 p.m., CBS | No. 3 | at Michigan | W 84–76 | 25–3 (14–3) | 35 – Edey | 15 – Edey | 11 – Smith | Crisler Center (12,707); Ann Arbor, MI |
| March 2, 2024; 8:00 p.m., FOX | No. 2 | Michigan State | W 80–74 | 26–3 (15–3) | 32 – Edey | 11 – Edey | 4 – Gillis | Mackey Arena (14,876); West Lafayette, IN |
| March 5, 2024; 7:00 p.m., Peacock | No. 3 | at No. 12 Illinois | W 77–71 | 27–3 (16–3) | 28 – Edey | 8 – Edey | 6 – Smith | State Farm Center (15,554); Champaign, IL |
| March 10, 2024; 12:30 p.m., FOX | No. 3 | Wisconsin | W 78–70 | 28–3 (17–3) | 25 – Edey | 14 – Edey | 10 – Smith | Mackey Arena (14,876); West Lafayette, IN |
Big Ten tournament
| March 15, 2024; 12:00 p.m., BTN | (1) No. 3 | vs. (8) Michigan State; Quarterfinals | W 67–62 | 29–3 | 29 – Edey | 12 – Edey | 8 – Smith | Target Center (12,498); Minneapolis, MN |
| March 16, 2024; 1:00 p.m., CBS | (1) No. 3 | vs. (5) Wisconsin; Semifinals | L 75–76 ^{OT} | 29–4 | 28 – Edey | 11 – Edey | 10 – Smith | Target Center (14,138); Minneapolis, MN |
NCAA tournament
| March 22, 2024*; 7:25 p.m., TBS | (1 MW) No. 3 | vs. (16 MW) Grambling State; First Round | W 78–50 | 30–4 | 30 – Edey | 21 – Edey | 10 – Smith | Gainbridge Fieldhouse (–); Indianapolis, IN |
| March 24, 2024*; 2:40 p.m., CBS | (1 MW) No. 3 | vs. (8 MW) No. 20 Utah State; Second Round | W 106–67 | 31–4 | 23 – Edey | 14 – Edey | 6 – Tied | Gainbridge Fieldhouse (16,770); Indianapolis, IN |
| March 29, 2024*; 7:39 p.m., TBS/TruTV | (1 MW) No. 3 | vs. (5 MW) No. 18 Gonzaga; Sweet Sixteen | W 80–68 | 32–4 | 27 – Edey | 14 – Edey | 15 – Smith | Little Caesars Arena (–); Detroit, MI |
| March 31, 2024*; 2:20 p.m., CBS | (1 MW) No. 3 | vs. (2 MW) No. 6 Tennessee; Elite Eight | W 72–66 | 33–4 | 40 – Edey | 16 – Edey | 7 – Smith | Little Caesars Arena (18,577); Detroit, MI |
| April 6, 2024*; 6:09 p.m., TBS | (1 MW) No. 3 | vs. (11 S) NC State; Final Four | W 63–50 | 34–4 | 20 – Edey | 12 – Edey | 6 – Smith | State Farm Stadium (74,720); Glendale, AZ |
| April 8, 2024*; 9:20 p.m., TBS | (1 MW) No. 3 | vs. (1 E) No. 1 UConn; National Championship | L 60–75 | 34–5 | 37 – Edey | 10 – Edey | 8 – Smith | State Farm Stadium (74,423); Glendale, AZ |
*Non-conference game. ^{#}Rankings from AP Poll. (#) Tournament seedings in parentheses. MW=Midwest region. S=South region. E=East region. All times are in Eastern Time.

== Rankings ==
Ranking movements Legend: ██ Increase in ranking ██ Decrease in ranking ( ) = First-place votes
| | Week | | | | | | | | | | | | | | | | | | | | |
| Poll | Pre | 1 | 2 | 3 | 4 | 5 | 6 | 7 | 8 | 9 | 10 | 11 | 12 | 13 | 14 | 15 | 16 | 17 | 18 | 19 | Final |
|---|---|---|---|---|---|---|---|---|---|---|---|---|---|---|---|---|---|---|---|---|---|
| AP | 3 (3) | 2 (7) | 2 (5) | 1 (60) | 4 | 3 | 1 (48) | 1 (46) | 1 (49) | 1 (54) | 2 (20) | 2 (17) | 2 (14) | 2 (16) | 2 (16) | 3 | 2 (4) | 3 (4) | 3 (4) | 3 | 2 |
| Coaches | 2 (5) | 2 (3) | 2 (5) | 1 (32) | 4 | 4 | 1 (20) | 1 (24) | 1 (23) | 1 (21) | 2 (12) | 2 (8) | 2 (8) | 2 (7) | 2 (8) | 3 | 3 (4) | 3 (1) | 3 (2) | 3 | 2 |
