= 2021–22 Purdue Boilermakers men's basketball team =

2021–22 Purdue Boilermakers men's basketball

Hall of Fame Tip Off champions

NCAA tournament, Sweet Sixteen
- Conference: Big Ten Conference

Ranking
- Coaches: No. 10
- AP: No. 10
- Record: 29–8 (14–6 Big Ten)
- Head coach: Matt Painter (17th season)
- Assistant coaches: Brandon Brantley (9th season); Terry Johnson (1st season); Paul Lusk (1st season)
- Home arena: Mackey Arena

2021–22 Big Ten Conference men's basketball standings
	Conf.				Overall
Team	W		L	PCT	W		L	PCT
No. 19 Illinois	15	–	5	.750	23	–	10	.697
No. 14 Wisconsin	15	–	5	.750	25	–	8	.758
No. 10 Purdue	14	–	6	.700	29	–	8	.784
Rutgers	12	–	8	.600	18	–	14	.563
No. 16 Iowa †	12	–	8	.600	26	–	10	.722
Ohio State	12	–	8	.600	20	–	12	.625
Michigan State	11	–	9	.550	23	–	13	.639
Michigan	11	–	9	.550	19	–	15	.559
Indiana	9	–	11	.450	21	–	14	.600
Maryland	7	–	13	.350	15	–	17	.469
Penn State	7	–	13	.350	14	–	17	.452
Northwestern	7	–	13	.350	15	–	16	.484
Nebraska	4	–	16	.200	10	–	22	.313
Minnesota	4	–	16	.200	13	–	17	.433
† Conference tournament winner Rankings from AP poll

The 2021–22 Purdue Boilermakers men's basketball team represented Purdue University in the 2021–22 NCAA Division I men's basketball season. Their head coach was Matt Painter in his 17th season with the Boilermakers. The Boilermakers played their home games at Mackey Arena in West Lafayette, Indiana as members of the Big Ten Conference.

On December 6, 2021, Purdue was ranked No. 1 in the AP poll for the first time in school history, receiving all 61 first-place votes. They were also ranked No. 1 in the Coaches poll.

== Previous season ==
In a season limited due to the ongoing COVID-19 pandemic, the Boilermakers finished the 2020–21 season 18–10, 13–6 in Big Ten play to finish in fourth place. They lost in the quarterfinals of the Big Ten tournament to Ohio State. They received an at-large bid to the NCAA tournament as the No. 4 seed in the South region, where they were upset in the first round by No. 13-seeded North Texas.

== Offseason ==
=== Departures ===
Name	Number	Pos.	Height	Weight	Year	Hometown	Reason for departure
Aaron Wheeler	1	F	6'9"	205	RS junior	Stamford, CT	Transferred to St. John's
Emmanuel Dowuona	4	C	6'10"	245	RS sophomore	Miami, FL	Transferred to Tennessee State

=== Recruiting classes ===
==== 2021 recruiting class ====
College recruiting
Name	Hometown	School	Height	Weight	Commit date
Trey Kaufman-Renn; PF	Sellersburg, IN	Silver Creek (IN)	6 ft 8 in (2.03 m)	210 lb (95 kg)	Oct 30, 2020
Trey Kaufman-Renn; PF	Recruit ratings: Rivals: 247Sports: ESPN: (86)				
Caleb Furst; PF / C	Fort Wayne, IN	Blackhawk Christian School (IN)	6 ft 9 in (2.06 m)	215 lb (98 kg)	Mar 2, 2020
Caleb Furst; PF / C	Recruit ratings: Rivals: 247Sports: ESPN: (84)				
Brian Waddell; SF	Carmel, IN	Carmel High School (IN)	6 ft 7 in (2.01 m)	215 lb (98 kg)	Apr 21, 2021
Brian Waddell; SF	Recruit ratings: Rivals:				
Overall recruit ranking: Rivals: — 247Sports: 34 ESPN: —
Note: In many cases, Scout, Rivals, 247Sports, On3, and ESPN may conflict in their listings of height and weight.; In these cases, the average was taken. ESPN grades are on a 100-point scale.; Sources: "Purdue 2021 Basketball Commitments". Rivals.; "2021 Purdue Boilermakers Recruiting Class". ESPN.; "2021 Team Ranking". Rivals.

==== 2022 recruiting class ====
College recruiting (2022)
Name	Hometown	School	Height	Weight	Commit date
Fletcher Loyer; SG	Fort Wayne, IN	Homestead (IN)	6 ft 3 in (1.91 m)	165 lb (75 kg)	Nov 23, 2020
Fletcher Loyer; SG	Recruit ratings: Rivals: 247Sports: ESPN: (82)				
Braden Smith; SG	Westfield, IN	Westfield (IN)	5 ft 10 in (1.78 m)	165 lb (75 kg)	Apr 29, 2021
Braden Smith; SG	Recruit ratings: Rivals: 247Sports: ESPN: (81)				
Camden Heide; SF	Plymouth, MN	Wayzata High School (MN)	6 ft 5 in (1.96 m)	180 lb (82 kg)	Jun 15, 2021
Camden Heide; SF	Recruit ratings: Rivals: 247Sports: ESPN: (80)				
Overall recruit ranking: Rivals: — 247Sports: 34 ESPN: —
Note: In many cases, Scout, Rivals, 247Sports, On3, and ESPN may conflict in their listings of height and weight.; In these cases, the average was taken. ESPN grades are on a 100-point scale.; Sources: "Purdue 2022 Basketball Commitments". Rivals.; "2022 Purdue Boilermakers Recruiting Class". ESPN.; "2022 Team Ranking". Rivals.

==== 2023 recruiting class ====
College recruiting (2023)
Name	Hometown	School	Height	Weight	Commit date
Myles Colvin; SG	Indianapolis, IN	Heritage Christian School (IN)	6 ft 4 in (1.93 m)	180 lb (82 kg)	Jul 7, 2021
Myles Colvin; SG	Recruit ratings: Rivals:				
Overall recruit ranking: Rivals: — 247Sports: 34 ESPN: —
Note: In many cases, Scout, Rivals, 247Sports, On3, and ESPN may conflict in their listings of height and weight.; In these cases, the average was taken. ESPN grades are on a 100-point scale.; Sources: "Purdue 2023 Basketball Commitments". Rivals.; "2023 Purdue Boilermakers Recruiting Class". ESPN.; "2023 Team Ranking". Rivals.

== Roster ==
2021–22 Purdue Boilermakers men's basketball team
Players
Coaches

Pos.	#	Name	Height	Weight	Year	Previous school	Hometown
F	0	Mason Gillis	6 ft 6 in (1.98 m)	230 lb (104 kg)	RS So	New Castle HS	New Castle, IN
F	1	Brian Waddell (redshirt)	6 ft 7 in (2.01 m)	185 lb (84 kg)	Fr	Carmel HS	Carmel, IN
G	2	Eric Hunter Jr.	6 ft 4 in (1.93 m)	175 lb (79 kg)	Sr	Tindley Prep	Indianapolis, IN
F	3	Caleb Furst	6 ft 10 in (2.08 m)	230 lb (104 kg)	Fr	Blackhawk Christian School	Fort Wayne, IN
F	4	Trey Kaufman-Renn (redshirt)	6 ft 9 in (2.06 m)	225 lb (102 kg)	Fr	Silver Creek HS	Sellersburg, IN
G	5	Brandon Newman	6 ft 5 in (1.96 m)	200 lb (91 kg)	RS So	Valparaiso HS	Valparaiso, IN
G	11	Isaiah Thompson	6 ft 1 in (1.85 m)	160 lb (73 kg)	Jr	Zionsville HS	Zionsville, IN
G	14	Jared Wulbrun (W)	5 ft 10 in (1.78 m)	180 lb (82 kg)	Sr	Cal Lutheran	Stanford, CA
C	15	Zach Edey	7 ft 4 in (2.24 m)	295 lb (134 kg)	So	IMG Academy	Toronto, ON
F	21	Matt Frost (W)	6 ft 5 in (1.96 m)	200 lb (91 kg)	Jr	Columbus East HS	Columbus, IN
G	22	Chase Martin (W)	6 ft 3 in (1.91 m)	180 lb (82 kg)	So	Tolton HS	Columbia, MO
G	23	Jaden Ivey	6 ft 4 in (1.93 m)	195 lb (88 kg)	So	La Lumiere School	South Bend, IN
G	25	Ethan Morton	6 ft 6 in (1.98 m)	215 lb (98 kg)	So	Butler Area HS	Butler, PA
G	34	Carson Barrett (W)	6 ft 5 in (1.96 m)	215 lb (98 kg)	So	Lafayette Central Catholic HS	Lafayette, IN
F	50	Trevion Williams	6 ft 10 in (2.08 m)	255 lb (116 kg)	Sr	Henry Ford Academy	Chicago, IL
G	55	Sasha Stefanovic	6 ft 5 in (1.96 m)	205 lb (93 kg)	RS Sr	Crown Point HS	Crown Point, IN

Head coach

- Matt Painter (Purdue)

Assistant coach(es)

- Brandon Brantley (Purdue)
- Terry Johnson (Purdue Fort Wayne)
- Paul Lusk (Southern Illinois)

Legend

- (C) Team captain
- (S) Suspended
- (I) Ineligible
- (W) Walk-on
- Injured
- Current redshirt

Roster

== Schedule and results ==
Purdue's game against Michigan on January 11, 2022, was postponed due to COVID-19 protocols at Michigan. The game was rescheduled for February 10.

Date time, TV	Rank^{#}	Opponent^{#}	Result	Record	High points	High rebounds	High assists	Site (attendance) city, state
Exhibition
November 4, 2021*; 7:00 p.m., BTN+	No. 7	Indianapolis	W 86–64		20 – Edey	6 – Williams	4 – Williams	Mackey Arena (14,804); West Lafayette, IN
Regular season
November 9, 2021*; 7:00 p.m., BTN+	No. 7	Bellarmine	W 96–67	1–0	23 – Stefanovic	9 – Tied	4 – Thompson	Mackey Arena (14,804); West Lafayette, IN
November 12, 2021*; 8:30 p.m., BTN	No. 7	Indiana State	W 92–67	2–0	27 – Ivey	10 – Edey	4 – Tied	Mackey Arena (14,804); West Lafayette, IN
November 16, 2021*; 7:00 p.m., BTN	No. 6	Wright State	W 96–52	3–0	20 – Williams	13 – Williams	4 – Hunter Jr.	Mackey Arena (14,804); West Lafayette, IN
November 20, 2021*; 4:00 p.m., ESPNews	No. 6	vs. No. 18 North Carolina; Hall of Fame Tip Off semifinals	W 93–84	4–0	23 – Stefanovic	10 – Ivey	8 – Stefanovic	Mohegan Sun Arena (9,176); Uncasville, CT
November 21, 2021*; 1:00 p.m., ABC	No. 6	vs. No. 5 Villanova; Hall of Fame Tip Off championship	W 80–74	5–0	21 – Edey	7 – Ivey	7 – Ivey	Mohegan Sun Arena (9,100); Uncasville, CT
November 26, 2021*; 2:00 p.m., BTN+	No. 3	Omaha	W 97–40	6–0	20 – Edey	10 – Williams	5 – Stefanovic	Mackey Arena (14,804); West Lafayette, IN
November 30, 2021*; 7:30 p.m., ESPN	No. 2	Florida State; ACC–Big Ten Challenge	W 93–65	7–0	18 – Ivey	6 – Tied	8 – Stefanovic	Mackey Arena (14,804); West Lafayette, IN
December 3, 2021; 9:00 p.m., BTN	No. 2	Iowa	W 77–70	8–0 (1–0)	19 – Ivey	18 – Williams	3 – Williams	Mackey Arena (14,804); West Lafayette, IN
December 9, 2021; 7:00 p.m., BTN	No. 1	at Rutgers	L 68–70	8–1 (1–1)	21 – Williams	11 – Williams	3 – Ivey	Jersey Mike's Arena (8,000); Piscataway, NJ
December 12, 2021*; 2:00 p.m., BTN	No. 1	vs. NC State; Basketball Hall of Fame Invitational	W 82–72 ^{OT}	9–1	22 – Williams	12 – Williams	9 – Williams	Barclays Center; Brooklyn, NY
December 18, 2021*; 12:00 p.m., FOX	No. 3	vs. Butler; Crossroads Classic	W 77–48	10–1	22 – Ivey	11 – Edey	3 – Stefanovic	Gainbridge Fieldhouse (17,905); Indianapolis, IN
December 20, 2021*; 7:00 p.m., BTN	No. 3	Incarnate Word	W 79–59	11–1	13 – Edey	9 – Edey	4 – Tied	Mackey Arena (14,804); West Lafayette, IN
December 29, 2021*; 5:00 p.m., BTN	No. 3	Nicholls	W 104–90	12–1	21 – Edey	11 – Williams	8 – Williams	Mackey Arena (14,804); West Lafayette, IN
January 3, 2022; 7:00 p.m., BTN	No. 3	No. 23 Wisconsin	L 69–74	12–2 (1–2)	24 – Edey	10 – Edey	4 – Morton	Mackey Arena (14,804); West Lafayette, IN
January 8, 2022; 12:00 p.m., BTN	No. 3	at Penn State	W 74–67	13–2 (2–2)	21 – Williams	9 – William	6 – Stefanovic	Bryce Jordan Center (10,464); University Park, PA
January 14, 2022; 6:30 p.m., FS1	No. 7	Nebraska	W 92–65	14–2 (3–2)	22 – Edey	9 – Edey	5 – Ivey	Mackey Arena (14,804); West Lafayette, IN
January 17, 2022; 12:00 p.m., FOX	No. 4	at No. 17 Illinois	W 96–88 ^{2OT}	15–2 (4–2)	22 – Stefanovic	8 – Tied	5 – Williams	State Farm Center (15,544); Champaign, IL
January 20, 2022; 7:00 p.m., FS1	No. 4	at Indiana; Rivalry/Indiana National Guard Governor's Cup	L 65–68	15–3 (4–3)	21 – Ivey	9 – Edey	3 – Edey	Simon Skjodt Assembly Hall (17,222); Bloomington, IN
January 23, 2022; 1:00 p.m., BTN	No. 4	Northwestern	W 80–60	16–3 (5–3)	22 – Stefanovic	10 – Tied	5 – Hunter Jr.	Mackey Arena (14,804); West Lafayette, IN
January 27, 2022; 9:00 p.m., FS1	No. 6	at Iowa	W 83–73	17–3 (6–3)	18 – Thompson	10 – Williams	5 – Williams	Carver–Hawkeye Arena (12,723); Iowa City, IA
January 30, 2022; 12:00 p.m., CBS	No. 6	No. 16 Ohio State	W 81–78	18–3 (7–3)	21 – Ivey	11 – Gillis	5 – Hunter Jr.	Mackey Arena (14,804); West Lafayette, IN
February 2, 2022; 7:00 p.m., BTN	No. 4	at Minnesota	W 88–73	19–3 (8–3)	21 – Ivey	12 – Edey	7 – Stefanovic	Williams Arena (9,975); Minneapolis, MN
February 5, 2022; 2:30 p.m., FOX	No. 4	Michigan	W 82–76	20–3 (9–3)	23 – Ivey	9 – Edey	7 – Ivey	Mackey Arena (14,804); West Lafayette, IN
February 8, 2022; 9:00 p.m., ESPN	No. 3	No. 13 Illinois	W 84–68	21–3 (10–3)	26 – Ivey	9 – Gillis	6 – Ivey	Mackey Arena (14,804); West Lafayette, IN
February 10, 2022; 9:00 p.m., ESPN	No. 3	at Michigan; Rescheduled from January 11	L 58–82	21–4 (10–4)	18 – Ivey	6 – Edey	2 – Williams	Crisler Center (11,542); Ann Arbor, MI
February 13, 2022; 1:00 p.m., CBS	No. 3	Maryland	W 62–61	22–4 (11–4)	17 – Stefanovic	11 – Edey	4 – Williams	Mackey Arena (14,804); West Lafayette, IN
February 16, 2022; 9:00 p.m., BTN	No. 5	at Northwestern	W 70–64	23–4 (12–4)	14 – Edey	8 – Edey	5 – Williams	Welsh–Ryan Arena (7,039); Evanston, IL
February 20, 2022; 5:30 p.m., FS1	No. 5	Rutgers	W 84–72	24–4 (13–4)	25 – Ivey	7 – Edey	4 – Tied	Mackey Arena (14,804); West Lafayette, IN
February 26, 2022; 12:00 p.m., ESPN	No. 4	at Michigan State	L 65–68	24–5 (13–5)	25 – Edey	7 – Gillis	4 – Stefanovic	Breslin Center (14,797); East Lansing, MI
March 1, 2022; 9:00 p.m., ESPN	No. 8	at No. 10 Wisconsin	L 67–70	24–6 (13–6)	22 – Ivey	9 – Edey	5 – Ivey	Kohl Center (17,287); Madison, WI
March 5, 2022; 2:00 p.m., ESPN	No. 8	Indiana; Rivalry/Indiana National Guard Governor's Cup	W 69–67	25–6 (14–6)	17 – Hunter Jr.	11 – Edey	5 – Hunter Jr.	Mackey Arena (14,804); West Lafayette, IN
Big Ten tournament
March 11, 2022; 9:00 p.m., BTN	(3) No. 9	vs. (11) Penn State; Quarterfinals	W 69–61	26–6	17 – Ivey	7 – Ivey	5 – Williams	Gainbridge Fieldhouse (16,415); Indianapolis, IN
March 12, 2022; 3:30 p.m., CBS	(3) No. 9	vs. (7) Michigan State; Semifinals	W 75–70	27–6	22 – Ivey	10 – Edey	5 – Ivey	Gainbridge Fieldhouse (17,762); Indianapolis, IN
March 13, 2022; 3:30 p.m., CBS	(3) No. 9	vs. (5) No. 24 Iowa; Championship	L 66–75	27–7	20 – Ivey	14 – Edey	6 – Ivey	Gainbridge Fieldhouse (17,732); Indianapolis, IN
NCAA tournament
March 18, 2022; 2:00 p.m., TBS	(3 E) No. 10	vs. (14 E) Yale; First Round	W 78–56	28–7	22 – Ivey	10 – Williams	4 – Tied	Fiserv Forum (17,500); Milwaukee, WI
March 20, 2022; 8:40 p.m., TNT	(3 E) No. 10	vs. (6 E) No. 25 Texas; Second Round	W 81–71	29–7	22 – Williams	10 – Edey	3 – Tied	Fiserv Forum (17,500); Milwaukee, WI
March 25, 2022; 7:09 p.m., CBS	(3 E) No. 10	vs. (15 E) Saint Peter's; Sweet Sixteen	L 64–67	29–8	16 – Williams	8 – Tied	4 – Gillis	Wells Fargo Center (20,136); Philadelphia, PA
*Non-conference game. ^{#}Rankings from AP Poll. (#) Tournament seedings in parentheses. E=East. All times are in Eastern Time.

== Rankings ==
Ranking movements Legend: ██ Increase in ranking ██ Decrease in ranking т = Tied with team above or below ( ) = First-place votes
	Week																			
Poll	Pre	1	2	3	4	5	6	7	8	9	10	11	12	13	14	15	16	17	18	Final
AP	7	6	3 (1)	2 (9)	1 (61)	3	3	3	3	7	4	6	4	3	5	4	8	9т	10	Not released
Coaches	7	7^	4	2 (10)	1 (29)	4т	3	3	3	5	4	6	3	3	7	7	9	9	9	10

*AP does not release post-NCAA Tournament rankings.
^Coaches did not release a week 1 poll.
