= Russell Byrd =

Basketball player

Personal information
- Born: March 4, 1992 (age 34) Fort Wayne, Indiana, U.S.
- Listed height: 6 ft 7 in (2.01 m)
- Listed weight: 205 lb (93 kg)

Career information
- High school: Blackhawk Christian School (Fort Wayne, Indiana)
- College: Michigan State (2010–2014)
- NBA draft: 2015: undrafted
- Playing career: 2015–2020
- Position: Point guard

Career history
- 2015–2016: Fundación Lucentum
- 2016–2017: Moncton Magic
- 2017–2018: St. John's Edge
- 2017–2018: KW Titans
- 2018–2019: Island Storm
- 2019–2020: SCM U Craiova

Russell Byrd (born March 4, 1992) is an American former professional basketball player. He played college basketball for Michigan State.

== College career ==
On May 21, 2014, Byrd announced he would transfer from Michigan State to Master's College in California.

== Professional career ==
On January 18, 2018, Byrd was traded to the St. John's Edge.

On July 23, 2018, Byrd signed a two-year contract with the Island Storm. It was the first multi-year deal in franchise history.
