= Trey Kaufman-Renn =

American basketball player (born 2002)

No. 9 – Kansas Jayhawks
- Position: Power forward
- League: Big 12 Conference

Personal information
- Born: August 19, 2002 (age 24) Sellersburg, Indiana, U.S.
- Listed height: 6 ft 9 in (2.06 m)
- Listed weight: 240 lb (109 kg)

Career information
- High school: Silver Creek (Sellersburg, Indiana)
- College: Purdue (2022–2026); Kansas (2026–present)
- NBA draft: 2026: 2nd round, 59th overall pick
- Drafted by: Minnesota Timberwolves

Career highlights
- First-team All-Big Ten (2025)
- Stats at NBA.com
- Stats at Basketball Reference

Trey Bellamy Kaufman-Renn (born August 19, 2002) is an American college basketball player for the Kansas Jayhawks of the Big 12 Conference. He previously played for the Purdue Boilermakers. He was selected by the Minnesota Timberwolves in the second round of the 2026 NBA draft.

== High school career ==
Kaufman-Renn attended Silver Creek High School in Sellersburg, Indiana. During his time at Silver Creek, he became the school's all-time leading scorer. During his junior season, he averaged 25.8 points, 9.6 rebounds, and 1.6 blocks per game. As a senior, Kaufman-Renn helped lead Silver Creek to state championship. He finished the season averaging 24.5 points, 11.8 rebounds, 3.6 assists and 1.9 blocks per game. A four-star recruit, Kaufman-Renn committed to play college basketball at Purdue University over offers from Indiana, North Carolina, and Virginia.

== College career ==
Kaufman-Renn redshirted his first year on campus. The following season, he appeared in 35 games, averaging 4.5 points and 1.8 rebounds per game, making an immediate impact. Kaufman-Renn's production increased the next season, starting in every game. Against Utah State in the second round of the NCAA Tournament, he finished with 18 points, eight rebounds, three assists and two blocks in a 106–67 victory. He averaged 6.4 points and 4.0 rebounds per game as a sophomore. As a junior, Kaufman-Renn averaged 20.1 points and 6.5 rebounds per game, earning first-team All-Big Ten honors. He averaged 14.2 points and a career-high 8.3 rebounds per game as a senior, helping the Boilermakers finish 30-9 and reach the Elite Eight.

In August 2026, Kaufmann-Renn filed a lawsuit against the NCAA, seeking a sixth season of eligibility after not playing during a redshirt year as a freshman. This following the new five-for-five years NCAA ruling. On September 9, 2026, Kaufmann-Renn was granted a temporary restraining order by the United States Court of Appeals for the Sixth Circuit, allowing him to join a team. Kaufmann-Renn subsequently announced he would not return to Purdue.

On October 19, Kaufmann-Renn joined the Kansas Jayhawks.

== Professional career ==
On June 24, 2026, the Minnesota Timberwolves selected Kaufman-Renn with the 59th overall pick in the 2026 NBA draft. However, he never signed a contract after the draft.

== Career statistics ==
Legend
GP	Games played	GS	Games started	MPG	Minutes per game
FG%	Field goal percentage	3P%	3-point field goal percentage	FT%	Free throw percentage
RPG	Rebounds per game	APG	Assists per game	SPG	Steals per game
BPG	Blocks per game	PPG	Points per game	**Bold**	Career high

=== College ===
Year	Team	GP	GS	MPG	FG%	3P%	FT%	RPG	APG	SPG	BPG	PPG
2021–22	Purdue	Redshirt										
2022–23	Purdue	35	0	11.3	.496	.250	.644	1.8	.7	.4	.2	4.5
2023–24	Purdue	39	39	17.0	.511	.333	.557	4.0	.9	.3	.4	6.4
2024–25	Purdue	36	36	30.8	.595	.429	.648	6.5	2.2	.7	.3	20.1
2025–26	Purdue	37	37	28.1	.578	.154	.636	8.3	2.5	.4	.2	14.2
2026–27	Kansas											

== Personal life ==
Kaufman-Renn was raised by Lara Renn, a single mother. She played basketball in high school. Trey has a younger brother named Jaylen. His uncle, Matt Renn, played college basketball for the Indiana State Sycamores.
