= Indy Classic =

NCAA Basketball Showcase

Locations of participating teams

The Indy Classic is a college basketball showcase doubleheader held annually at Gainbridge Fieldhouse in Indianapolis, Indiana. It replaced the Crossroads Classic. It originally featured the Ball State Cardinals and the Purdue Boilermakers; Ball State was eventually replaced by the Butler Bulldogs.

The showcase is an annual fundraiser for the Indiana Sport's Corp's non-profit mission.

The president of the nonprofit Indiana Sports Corp has confirmed that they are working to schedule teams through the 2027–28 season.

== History ==
In 2022, the doubleheader was founded as a replacement to the Crossroads Classic. An indefinite agreement was reached to host the event each December.

In 2023, the event was a sellout. Peacock had exclusive broadcast rights to games, and viewing was only available through their streaming service. The #1 Arizona Wildcats were upset by the #3 Purdue Boilermakers.

In 2024, the headliner match-up was between #17 Texas A&M and #11 Purdue. #20 Wisconsin and Butler both made their first appearance in the showcase.

In 2025, the headliner match-up was between #21 Auburn and #6 Purdue. Northwestern and Butler was the opener.

== Results by year ==
Year	Date	Time	Winning Team	Score	Losing Team	TV
2022	December 17	3:30PM EST	Ball State	83–69	Illinois State	ESPN+
2022	December 17	6:15PM EST	#1 Purdue	69–61	Davidson	BTN
2023	December 16	1:45PM EST	Indiana State	83–72	Ball State	Peacock
2023	December 16	4:40PM EST	#3 Purdue	92–84	#1 Arizona	Peacock
2024	December 14	12:00PM EST	#17 Texas A&M	70–66	#11 Purdue	CBS
2024	December 14	2:55PM EST	#20 Wisconsin	83–74	Butler	BTN
2025	December 20	4:00PM EST	Butler	61–58	Northwestern	Peacock
2025	December 20	6:30PM EST	#6 Purdue	88–60	#21 Auburn	Peacock
2026	December 19	3:00PM EST	Butler vs. Georgia Tech			FS1
2026	December 19	5:30PM EST	Purdue vs. Colorado			FS1

== All-time records by team ==
More than one appearance

Team	Record	Percentage
Purdue	3–1	.750
Ball State	1–1	.500
Butler	1–1	.500

Only one appearance

Team	Record	Percentage
Indiana State	1–0	1.000
Texas A&M	1–0	1.000
Wisconsin	1–0	1.000
Arizona	0–1	.000
Auburn	0–1	.000
Davidson	0–1	.000
Illinois State	0–1	.000
Northwestern	0–1	.000
Colorado	0–0	–
Georgia Tech	0–0	–

== Attendance by year ==
Year	Attendance
2022	9,242
2023	17,315
2024	15,045
2025	16,912

== Event Records ==
Team

Record		Stat	Year	Team
Points	Most	92	2023	Purdue
Points	Least	58	2025	Northwestern
Rebounds	Most	48	2022	Purdue
Rebounds	Least	23	2024	Purdue
Assists	Most	24	2023	Arizona
Assists	Least	7	2022	Illinois State
Turnovers	Most	18	2024	Texas A&M
Turnovers	Least	3	2024	Wisconsin
Blocks	Most	8	2023	Ball State
Blocks	Least	1	2023, 2023, 2024, 2025	Arizona, Indiana State, Wisconsin, Auburn
Steals	Most	11	2024, 2024	Purdue, Texas A&M
Steals	Least	1	2024	Butler
Fouls	Most	22	2024	Wisconsin
Fouls	Least	11	2022, 2024, 2025	Purdue, Texas A&M, Butler

Personal

Record	Stat	Year	Individual	Team
Points	29	2022, 2023	Zach Edey, Caleb Love	Purdue, Arizona
Rebounds	20	2025	Michael Ajayi	Butler
Assists	14	2022	Braden Smith	Purdue
Turnovers	6	2024	Braden Smith	Purdue
Blocks	3	2022, 2022, 2024, 2025	David Skogman, Demarius Jacobs, Andre Screen, Daniel Jacobson	Davidson, Ball State, Butler, Purdue
Steals	5	2024	Wade Taylor IV	Texas A&M
