= Caleb Furst =

American basketball player (born 2002)

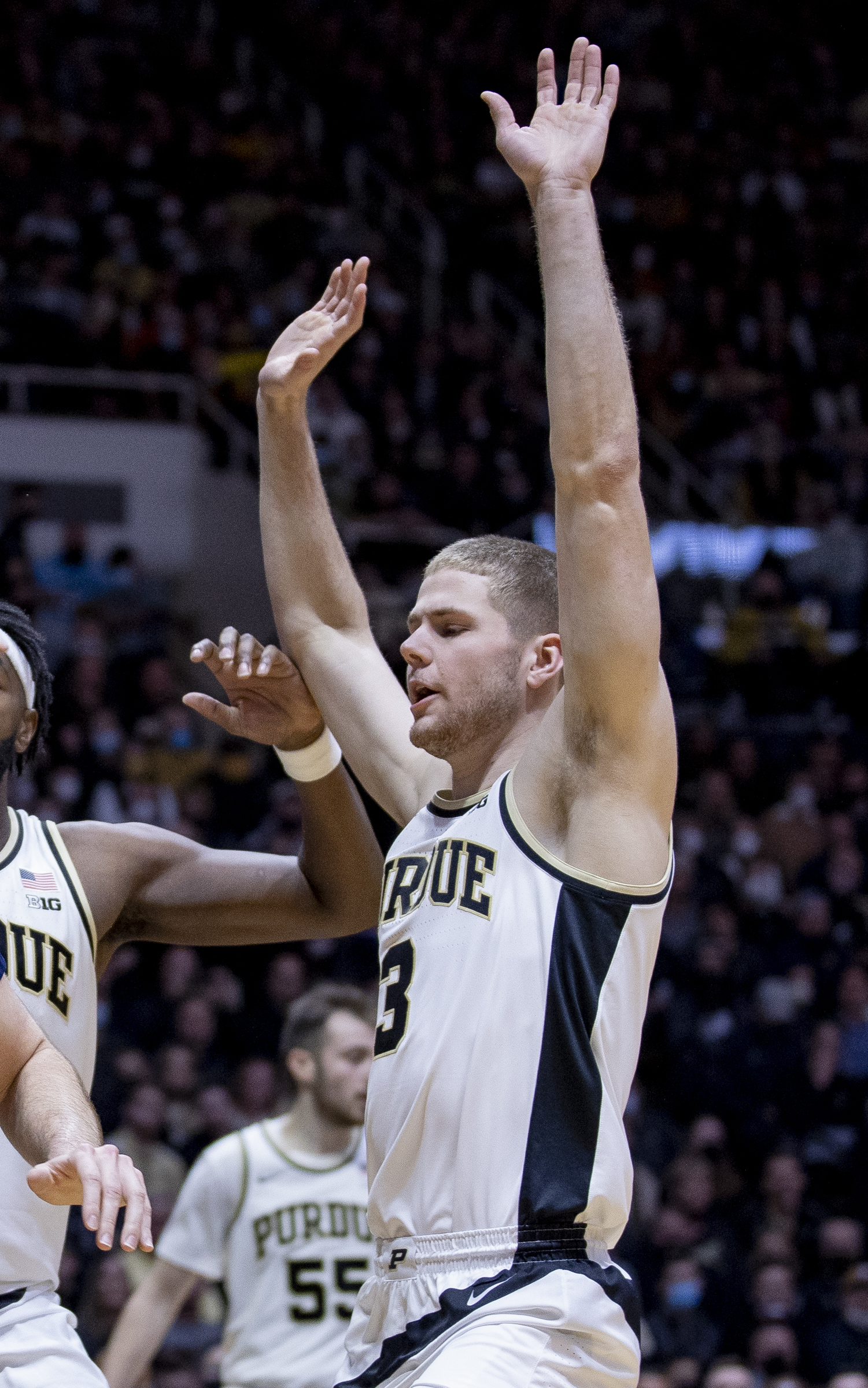
- Furst with Purdue in 2022

Personal information
- Born: May 18, 2002 (age 24)
- Listed height: 6 ft 10 in (2.08 m)
- Listed weight: 230 lb (104 kg)

Career information
- High school: Blackhawk Christian School (Fort Wayne, Indiana)
- College: Purdue (2021–2025)
- NBA draft: 2025: undrafted
- Position: Power forward / center

Career highlights
- Indiana Mr. Basketball (2021)
Medals
Men's basketball
Representing the United States
FIBA Under-19 World Cup
Gold medal – first place	2021 Latvia	Team

Caleb Martin Furst (born May 18, 2002) is an American medical student and former basketball player. He played college basketball for the Purdue Boilermakers.

== High school career ==
Furst played basketball for Blackhawk Christian School in Fort Wayne, Indiana. He won a Class A state title as a sophomore. In his junior season, Furst averaged 22.1 points, 13.4 rebounds, 3.6 assists and two blocks per game, helping Blackhawk achieve a 23–3 record. As a senior, he averaged 21.4 points, 14.1 rebounds, three assists and 2.2 blocks per game, leading his team to a 28–3 record and the Class 2A state championship. At the end of the season, Furst was named Indiana Mr. Basketball and Indiana Gatorade Player of the Year. He left as his school's all-time leader in points and rebounds. A consensus four-star recruit, he committed to playing college basketball for Purdue over offers from Indiana, Michigan State, Louisville and Virginia, among others.

== College career ==
On November 16, 2021, in his second career game, Furst collected his first career double-double with 14 points and 11 rebounds against Wright State. He averaged 4.1 points, 3.2 rebounds and 0.4 assists per game as a freshman. Following the season, Furst underwent left foot surgery. As a sophomore, he averaged 5.5 points and 4.6 rebounds per game.

== National team career ==
Furst represented the United States at the 2021 FIBA Under-19 World Cup in Latvia. He averaged 7.1 points and 4.1 rebounds per game, helping his team win the gold medal.

== Career statistics ==
Legend
GP	Games played	GS	Games started	MPG	Minutes per game
FG%	Field goal percentage	3P%	3-point field goal percentage	FT%	Free throw percentage
RPG	Rebounds per game	APG	Assists per game	SPG	Steals per game
BPG	Blocks per game	PPG	Points per game	**Bold**	Career high

=== College ===
Year	Team	GP	GS	MPG	FG%	3P%	FT%	RPG	APG	SPG	BPG	PPG
2021–22	Purdue	34	12	14.6	**.573**	**.423**	**.717**	3.2	.4	.2	.2	4.1
2022–23	Purdue	35	21	**18.4**	.513	.268	.592	**4.6**	**.7**	.4	**.3**	**5.5**
2023–24	Purdue	**36**	0	9.0	.441	.273	.676	2.4	.6	.2	.2	2.2
2024–25	Purdue	**36**	**23**	**18.4**	.545		.646	3.5	.4	**.6**	.2	4.1

== Personal life ==
Furst is the son of Gary and Lotus Furst. He has two brothers, Nathan, who played soccer at Blackhawk Christian School as a goalkeeper, and Joshua, a Purdue basketball walk-on. Furst majored in Biomedical health sciences and currently is a medical student at the Ohio State University College of Medicine.
