= Matt Painter =

American basketball coach (born 1970)

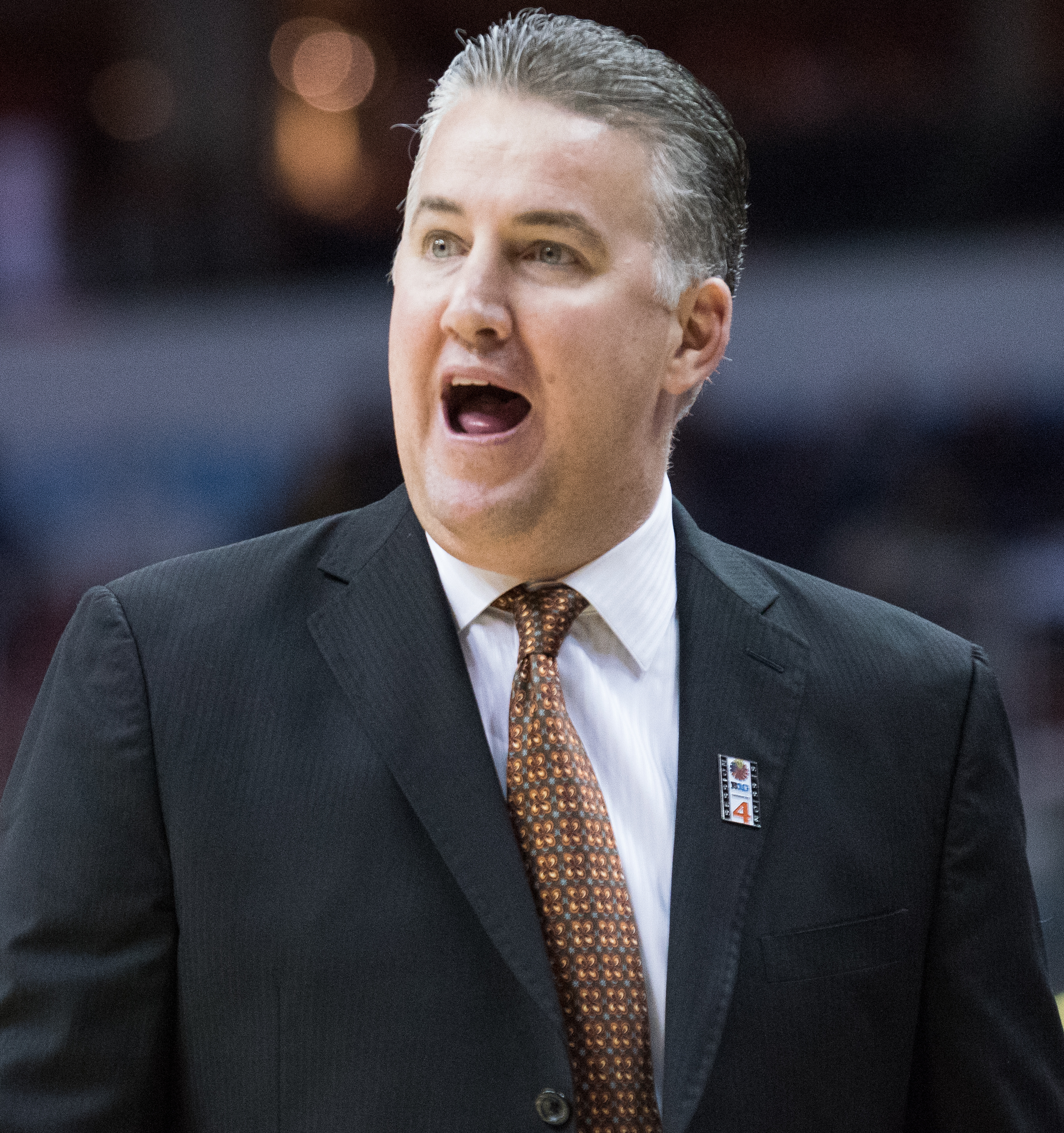
- Painter in 2017

Current position
- Title: Head coach
- Team: Purdue
- Conference: Big Ten
- Record: 505–226 (.691)
- Annual salary: $4.975 million

Biographical details
- Born: August 27, 1970 (age 56); Fort Wayne, Indiana, U.S.
- Education: Purdue University

Playing career
- 1989–1993: Purdue
- Position: Guard

Coaching career (HC unless noted)
- 1993–1994: Washington & Jefferson (assistant)
- 1994–1995: Barton (assistant)
- 1995–1998: Eastern Illinois (assistant)
- 1998–2003: Southern Illinois (assistant)
- 2003–2004: Southern Illinois
- 2004–2005: Purdue (associate HC)
- 2005–present: Purdue

Head coaching record
- Overall: 530–231 (.696)
- Tournaments: 27–18 (NCAA Division I); 1–1 (CBI)

Accomplishments and honors

Championships
- NCAA Division I regional – Final Four (2024); 5× Big Ten regular season (2010, 2017, 2019, 2023, 2024); 3× Big Ten tournament (2009, 2023, 2026); MVC regular season (2004)

Awards
- NABC Coach of the Year (2019); 5× Big Ten Coach of the Year (2008, 2010, 2011, 2019, 2024); 2× AP Big 10 Coach of the Year (2023, 2024); MVC Coach of the Year (2004); John R. Wooden Legends of Coaching Award (2025)
Medal record
Men's basketball
Head Coach for United States
Summer Universiade
Silver medal – second place	2017 Taipei	Team competition

Matthew Curtis Painter (born August 27, 1970) is an American college basketball coach and former player. He is currently the 19th Boilermakers men's basketball head coach at Purdue University, serving in that role since 2005. Painter was also the head coach at Southern Illinois University for one season in 2003–04. He played at Purdue as a guard from 1989 to 1993.

Painter was born in Fort Wayne, Indiana. He attended high school at Delta High School in Muncie, Indiana. After graduation from high school in 1989, Painter enrolled at Purdue University and played point guard for the Boilermakers, starting for one season. As a senior in 1993, he led Purdue in assists and was an honorable mention All-Big Ten Conference selection.

From 1993 to 2003, Painter was an assistant coach at Washington & Jefferson (1993–94), Barton (1994–95), Eastern Illinois (1995–1998) and Southern Illinois (1998–2003). After helping lead Southern Illinois to consecutive Missouri Valley Conference championships in 2002 and 2003, he was promoted to head coach when Bruce Weber left for Illinois, where he led the Salukis to another conference championship in one season, including advancing to the 2004 NCAA Division I Tournament. Immediately afterward, Painter signed a six-year deal as head coach of the Purdue Boilermakers, where he would spend a year as a coach-in-waiting until Gene Keady's retirement at the end of the season. With Painter at the helm, Purdue teams have won the Big Ten Conference five times, the Big Ten Tournament three times, and have reached the NCAA tournament 17 times, with nine Sweet-16 appearances, three Elite Eight appearances, one Final Four and one national title game appearance. Combined with his Southern Illinois' NCAA Tournament appearance, he has a total of 18 tournament appearances in 22 years coaching. During his tenure at Purdue, Painter has coached a total of eleven players who went on to play in the NBA, with three of them being drafted in the first round of the NBA draft. Painter has been named Big Ten Conference Coach of the year five times, which is second all time behind his predecessor Gene Keady.

== Playing career ==
Matt Painter was born in Fort Wayne, Indiana, and attended Delta High School, in Muncie, Indiana. He played basketball for former basketball coach and athletic director, Stan Daugherty. He grew up a fan of Indiana Hoosiers men's basketball and dreamed of playing for coach Bobby Knight at IU; however, Coach Knight never offered him a scholarship. Instead, Painter attended Purdue University as an undergraduate. He played four seasons as a Boilermakers point guard under head coach Gene Keady and assistants Bruce Weber and Steve Lavin. During his college career, the team went to three NCAA Tournaments and one NIT appearance, with his best NCAA Tourney finish being the round of 32. He was teammates with Jimmy Oliver, Steve Scheffler, and Glenn Robinson. He started 50 of the 109 games in which he appeared and helped his team to a 75–45 overall record. In his senior season, he was selected as a team captain and was named an All-Big Ten Honorable Mention. Painter finished his career averaging 4.5 points-per-game and totaling 276 assists.

Year	Team	GP	MPG	FG%	3P%	FT%	RPG	APG	SPG	BPG	PPG
1989–90	Purdue	19	4.4	.267	.333	.400	0.4	0.6	0.1	0.1	0.8
1990–91	Purdue	29	20.3	.423	.357	.634	1.9	3.0	0.2	0.0	4.2
1991–92	Purdue	33	13.7	.390	.286	.717	1.4	1.5	0.5	0.0	3.3
1992–93	Purdue	28	30.3	.491	.387	.677	2.7	4.5	0.8	0.1	8.6

Cited from Sports Reference.

== Coaching career ==
=== Assistant coach ===
After graduation from Purdue in 1993, Painter moved on to coaching basketball. His first year as a coach was an assistant coach position at Washington & Jefferson College. as an assistant to former Purdue assistant coach Tom Reiter. With Painter's help, the team finished the season with a 22–3 record and a quarterfinal appearance in the NCAA Division III tournament. During this time, he worked as a forklift operator to supplement his income.

The next season, he became an assistant coach at Barton College. In the 1994–95 season, Barton finished with 13 wins and 13 losses. Painter then moved to Division I as an assistant coach at Eastern Illinois of the Ohio Valley Conference, where he also received his master's degree.

=== Southern Illinois ===
After three years at Eastern Illinois, he moved to Southern Illinois in 1998 as an assistant to head coach Bruce Weber. Painter was previously acquainted with him while Weber was an assistant coach at Purdue during Painter's playing days. Weber and Painter quickly turned a team that had a losing record the previous season into a successful team. Painter helped lead the Salukis to the NIT in 2000 and twice to the NCAA tournament the following seasons while an assistant coach. In the 2001–02 season, they qualified for the NCAA tournament and ended their season in the Sweet Sixteen with a loss to UConn. That year, SIU beat well-established programs such as Georgia and Texas Tech. In 2003, Weber's and Painter's Salukis were featured on MTV's special True Life: I Am a College Baller.

After serving as an assistant coach for five seasons at SIU, Painter stepped into his first NCAA Division I head coaching position after Bruce Weber took the head coaching job at Illinois for the 2003–04 season. Leading the Salukis to a 25–5 record and a berth in the 2004 NCAA tournament, the team was ranked as high as #15 in the nation by the AP poll during the season. Painter was named the 2003–2004 Missouri Valley Conference Coach of the Year.

=== Purdue ===
==== 2004–05 season ====
In 2004, Painter was recruited by Purdue as the replacement for retiring head coach Gene Keady. He signed a six-year contract as the new Purdue Boilermakers men's basketball coach. As part of a planned transition, Painter was named the associate head coach for the 2004–05 season. He joined former teammate Cuonzo Martin (former head coach at the University of Missouri) on the coaching staff. With key players out with injuries, suspensions and transfers, Purdue finished the season with a 7–21 record, the most losses in the program's history in a season.

==== 2005–06 season ====
At the start of the 2005–06 season, Painter took over for Keady as the head coach at his alma mater and became the second former Purdue player to become the head coach since Ray Eddy (1950–1965). In his first season in that role, despite the absences of injured starters, David Teague and Carl Landry, and only playing with seven scholarship players, they finished with a 9–19 record. Painter's first Purdue squad as a head coach came up with wins against eventual NCAA Tournament qualifier Wisconsin and #23 Michigan.

==== 2006–07 season ====
In his second season as head coach, the team had high hopes for an NCAA berth. Both power forward Carl Landry and shooting guard David Teague returned to the lineup after injuries, combining an average of about 34 points and 15 rebounds per game. Painter's Boilermakers finished the non-conference season with an 11–3 record, which included wins over previously unbeaten and top 25 schools Virginia and Missouri. They headed deep into the regular season without a road win. The team had also not won a road game in the two prior seasons during which Painter was part of the Boilermaker's bench. That 29 road-game losing streak ended on February 3, 2007, when Purdue beat Penn State at the Bryce Jordan Center. After winning seven of their last ten conference games during the regular season and setting a single-season school record for most home wins at 16 in Mackey Arena, Painter and his Boilermakers finished the regular season with a 9–7 conference record. They received a 5th seed in the Big Ten tournament and were knocked out in the semifinals when they lost to a Greg Oden-led Ohio State team. Purdue was invited to the 2007 NCAA tournament, Painter's second appearance as a head coach, and received a 9 seed. The team's opening round opponent was Lute Olson's Arizona. After beating the Wildcats, Purdue fell to Billy Donovan's number one seeded and defending/eventual national champions, Florida. With +13 wins from the previous season, it was the biggest win-margin turnaround in the program's history.

==== 2007–08 season ====
Coming off one of the program's biggest single season improvements, Painter returned only one senior on the roster with 6 newcomers. Painter achieved notable recruiting success, signing one of the top five recruiting classes in the nation for 2007, all coming from the state of Indiana. Painter started at least three freshmen in every game at the start of the 2007–08 season, making it the youngest starting line-up in the nation. His "baby boilers" finished the non-conference season with a 9–4 record, which included a win against Rick Pitino's #22 ranked Louisville, as well as a loss to Wofford, their only home loss of the season. During an eleven-game winning streak in conference play, they swept the season series with the conference champion #8 Wisconsin and had a home win against #9 Michigan State. It was the first back-to-back wins versus top ten teams in school history. Their winning streak was ended when they lost to in-state rival, #14 Indiana. Painter and his Boilers finished the regular season in 2nd place with a 15–3 record. During the regular season and into the conference tournament, Purdue was ranked as high as #15 in both polls. Painter's team entered the Big Ten tournament with the #2 seed. They lost in the quarterfinals to the 10th seeded Illinois. They were invited to the 2008 NCAA tournament and given a #6 seed. They beat Baylor in the first round, giving Purdue its 10th straight first round win in the tournament. They lost in the second round to a senior-led Xavier team. He was eventually named the Big Ten Conference Coach of the Year. The Boilers finished the season with a 25–9 record.

==== 2008–09 season ====
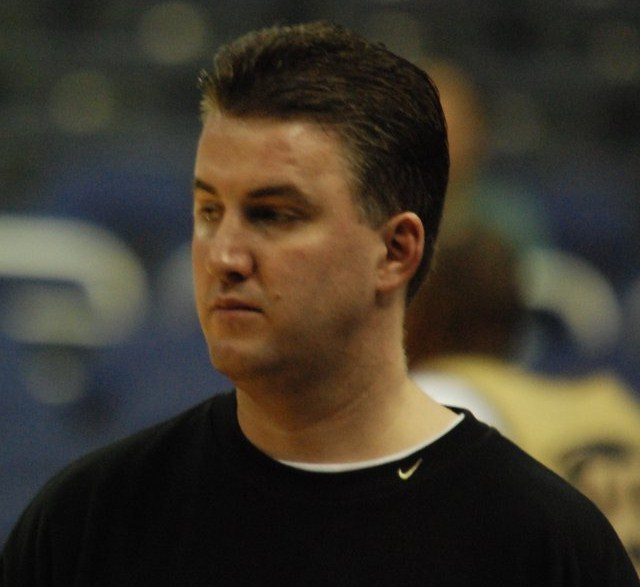
Painter in 2008.

Painter's Boilermakers began the 2008–2009 season with an ESPN/USA Today Poll rank at #10 and an AP Top 25 #11 ranking. They had five returning starters from the prior season, including Chris Kramer, the conference's defensive player of the year and two all-conference selections in E'Twaun Moore and Robbie Hummel. Painter's Boilers opened the season with a 5–0 record. In the first game of the season, his team set the school record for fewest turnovers in a game, only committing three, against Detroit on November 14, 2008. With a #9 ranking, Purdue had their first losses of the season back-to-back in overtime to #13 ranked Oklahoma in the NIT Season Tip-Off championship game and a 16-point home loss against #4 Duke. They finished the pre-season with an 11–2 record, which included a win against #22 Davidson. Purdue finished third in conference play, including a season-sweep by Illinois and splitting the season meetings with conference title winners, Michigan State. Near the end of the regular season, he was selected as one of ten candidates for the Henry Iba Award, which goes to the nation's best coach of the year. With a much healthier Robbie Hummel in the lineup, they entered the Big Ten tournament with the #3 seed, beating Ohio State in the finals, giving Purdue its first conference tournament championship in school history. Throughout the tournament, Painter's team averaged 16 assists and less than six turnovers in three games. Painter led his team to a third straight NCAA tournament appearance with a #5 seed, the team's highest seed in 10 years. They beat Northern Iowa from the MVC in the first round, becoming the program's 11th straight first round win dating back to 1994. After beating Washington in the second round, Purdue reached their first Sweet Sixteen in 9 years, eventually losing to Jim Calhoun's Hasheem Thabeet-led UConn. Painter's team finished the season with a 27–10 record, the most games played in a season in its program's history. Despite beginning his Purdue head coaching position coming off a prior 7-win season, he surpassed Gene Keady's first four season's (1981–1985) win total of 82 in his first four (2005–2009) with 83 victories.

===== U19 USA Championships Team =====
On May 12, 2009, Painter accepted an assistant coach position for the 2009 USA Basketball U19 World Championships team. Along with current head coach and former fellow assistant Chris Lowery at Southern Illinois, he served under Pittsburgh head coach Jamie Dixon. Painter helped lead the team to a 9–0 record with a 22.2 point win margin, while winning the gold after beating Greece.

==== 2009–10 season ====
Painter and his team began the 2009–10 season with a 14–0 record, which tied the 1993–94 team for the best start in the program's history. He returned his entire regular starting five, including three all-conference selections in JaJuan Johnson, E'Twaun Moore, and Robbie Hummel. Painter started his fifth season at Purdue with his team receiving a preseason 7th overall ranking by both the Associated Press and Coaches Polls, the program's highest in 22 years. Coach Painter led his top ten ranked team to the 2009 Paradise Jam tournament championship against Bruce Pearl's #10 Tennessee, followed by the preseason close with a home win over #6 West Virginia and a 12–0 record against non-conference opponents. On January 28, 2010, he won his 100th game as Purdue's head coach against Wisconsin, becoming the fourth fastest to reach the mark behind former Purdue coaches Ward Lambert, George King, and Gene Keady. Deep into the regular conference season, Painter got his first career road wins against #10 Michigan State in East Lansing and #9 Ohio State in Columbus, leaving Purdue as the only team in the nation to go 4–0 against top ten teams. With a ten-game winning streak in conference play, Purdue received a #3 ranking in both polls, giving Painter his highest ranking as both a player and head coach, while being the program's highest in sixteen years. After losing All-Conference starter Robbie Hummel to an ACL injury, Painter pushed his junior/senior-led team in the last three conference games (2–1), culminating with a 14–4 conference record and a share of the Big Ten title, the program's first in fourteen years. At the end of the regular season, he was named the coaches' pick for Big Ten Conference Coach of the Year, his second time being honored with the title since arriving at Purdue. After beating Siena in the first round of the NCAA tournament and Texas A&M in the second round with a 4 seed, Painter has led Purdue to consecutive Sweet Sixteen appearances and currently has an overall 6–4 record in NCAA Tournament games after losing to Duke. Finishing with a 29–6 record, it tied for most wins in a season in school history.

==== 2010–11 season ====
Coming off the most wins in a four-year span in school history with 102 (2007–2010), Painter and his Boiler squad returned two All-American candidates (JaJuan Johnson, E'Twaun Moore), its primary point guard (Lewis Jackson), and an All-Conference freshman (Kelsey Barlow). ESPN's Andy Katz selected Purdue as the preseason No. 1-ranked team for the 2011 season, while Fox Sports selected them as the No. 4 favorite. These predictions came premature as fellow All-American candidate, Robbie Hummel, re-tore his ACL during practice, preventing him from playing his senior season. Joining the sidelines was Painter's latest addition to his bench staff, Mike Jackson, a former Michigan assistant coach. In preseason play, Painter's team began the season ranked as high as eighth in the nation and fell as low as 22nd following a loss to Richmond in the Chicago Invitational finals. Painter's Boilers went undefeated at home on the season for the first time in 42 years (16–0). They tied series with ranked Wisconsin, Minnesota, and the top-ranked team in the nation, Ohio State. No. 6 Purdue finished second in the Big Ten Conference with a 14–4 record, while finishing the regular season 26–8 overall. At the conclusion of the regular season, Painter was named Big Ten Conference Coach of the Year for the third time in four seasons. Painter received his highest NCAA tournament seeding as a coach, with No. 13-ranked Purdue being named a No. 3 seed in the Tournament. They defeated Saint Peter's in the first round, but were upset by Final Four-bound No. 11 seed VCU the second round.

===== Connection to Missouri vacancy =====
On March 30, 2011, it was reported that Painter might accept the University of Missouri head coaching position. However, after the initial reports surfaced, Purdue announced that Painter had accepted a new eight-year deal to remain with the school.

==== 2011–12 season ====
After losing All-American seniors in JaJuan Johnson and E'Twaun Moore to graduation and the NBA, Painter returned a handful of experienced role players and Preseason First Team All-Big Ten forward Robbie Hummel, who returned from a second ACL injury. His Boiler squad began the 2012 season unranked for the first time in four seasons. Joining him on the bench were two new assistant coaches in Micah Shrewsberry, who was part of the coaching staff that guided Butler to consecutive NCAA Finals, and Greg Gary, who previously assisted at Duquesne, South Florida, Miami, and Tulane. On November 11, Painter's squad opened the season beating Northern Illinois by 62 points, the program's highest win margin since 1911. Painter's team received its first loss of the season against No. 15-ranked Alabama in the Puerto Rico Tip-Off title game. Their second loss of the season came on the road against No. 11-ranked Xavier, a game where Painter's squad forced a season-high 22 turnovers and was up by 19 points in the second half. On December 17 at Conseco Fieldhouse, his team was upset by Butler after losing a 15-point lead, losing by two. Closing the preseason with a 10–3 record and a 3–2 start in conference play, Purdue owned the fifth longest home winning streak in the nation at 27 before losing to Wisconsin. Against Illinois on New Year's Eve, Painter received his 150th win at Purdue and his 175th career win as a head coach. Three times in conference play, Painter's squad committed a school-record three turnovers in a game, losing all three, which included a three-point loss in a road game against No. 3 Ohio State. Painter got his first win against a ranked team on the season beating No. 11 Michigan on the road by 14 points, giving Michigan their only home loss on the season. His squad led the nation in fewest turnovers, committing just 8.9 per game (7.6 in conference play) while averaging a −4.6 turnover margin against opponents. With the 20th win on the season against Penn State on February 29, Painter gave Purdue its sixth consecutive 20-win season, tying a program record with Gene Keady's mid-1980s mark. Purdue ended the Big Ten season at 10–8 in conference play (sixth) and stood at 21–12 overall after the Big Ten tournament. On March 11, the Boilermakers received an at-large bid as the No. 10 seed in the Midwest region of the NCAA tournament. In the first round of the Tournament, Purdue beat No. 7 seed Saint Mary's 72–69, their 14th straight First Round victory, the longest current streak at that time. In the second round, Purdue lost to No. 2 Kansas 63–60. Purdue ended the season 22–13, their sixth straight year with 22 or more wins.

==== 2012–13 season ====
Painter began the 2013 season after losing three senior starters from the previous season including All-American Robbie Hummel and point guard Lewis Jackson. Also leaving the program were would-be seniors in shooting guard John Hart (transferred to IUPUI) and suspended guard/forward Kelsey Barlow (transferred to UIC). Painter's raw and young squad began the season with a 2–3 record, losing their season opener for the first time during the Painter-era. Purdue went on to lose games to Villanova and Oregon State at Madison Square Garden in the 2K Sports Classic. The Boilers finished 7–6 in non-conference play. In Big Ten play, Painter consistently started at least three freshmen, which included a B1G-All Freshman A. J. Hammons and Ronnie Johnson. Painter's squad made improvement towards the end of the season, after going through much inconsistency, getting wins at No. 7 Wisconsin, a near upset against of No. 7 Michigan, and a blowout win against Minnesota, Painter's 200th career win. Finishing seventh in conference play with an 8–10 record, Purdue lost to Nebraska in the first round of the Big Ten tournament. Purdue accepted a bid to the CBI, where they defeated Western Illinois before losing to Santa Clara and finishing with a 16–18 overall record.

==== 2013–14 season ====
In his ninth season at Purdue, the Boilermakers started well, finishing the non-conference slate at 10–3. However, the Boilers struggled in Big Ten play despite winning three of their first five games in conference. The Boilers would lose 11 of their last 13 regular season games to finish last in the league with a 5–13 record. A loss in the first round of the Big Ten tournament to No. 24 Ohio State left Purdue with a 15–17 overall record and without a postseason.

==== 2014–15 season ====
In his 10th season as Purdue's head coach, Painter brought in three contributing freshman, including the tallest player in the program's history, 7'2" Isaac Haas. With an 8–5 non-conference record that included a blowout loss to a ranked Notre Dame and home losses to North Florida and Gardner Webb, Painter was viewed by many as being on the hot seat. With the play of juniors A. J. Hammons and Rapheal Davis and the additional lift of transfer senior point guard John Octeus, Painter's squad turned things around in conference play. They finished third in conference with a 12–6 record after being predicted to finish near the bottom of the league. They defeated three ranked teams in a four-game stretch with home wins against No. 25 Iowa, No. 20 Ohio State, and No. 21 Indiana. During this time, Painter received his 100th Big Ten win and reached a personal 9–8 winning record against in-state rivals Indiana with a season sweep. A loss in the semifinals of the Big Ten tournament to No. 6 Wisconsin preceded an at-large bid to the NCAA tournament. The trip marked Painter's eighth appearance as a head coach. The No. 9-seeded Boilers would fall in overtime to the No. 8-seeded Cincinnati in the first round. They finished with a 21–13 overall record on the season.

==== 2015–16 season ====
Painter accomplished a first in his coaching career by landing a five-star recruit in 2015 Indiana Mr. Basketball Caleb Swanigan, who switched his commitment from Michigan State to Purdue. Painter led the team to a 26–9 overall record. The team maintained an AP Top 25 ranking throughout their entire season, but showed inconsistency. The team boasted victories over conference heavyweights Michigan State, Maryland, and Wisconsin. In the Big Ten tournament, they fell four points shy of the championship losing to Michigan State. The team's inconsistency continued as they fell to 12-seeded Arkansas-Little Rock in the first round of the NCAA tournament.

Senior center A. J. Hammons was selected as a finalist for the Kareem Abdul-Jabbar Award for best center, and was selected as Big Ten Defensive Player of the Year, succeeding Purdue teammate and 2015 recipient Raphael Davis.

==== 2016–17 season ====
Purdue was ranked in the top-25 throughout the entire season, the second consecutive season to boast that accomplishment. They won their 23rd Big Ten Conference regular season championship and first outright title in 21 years (1996) by finishing the season with a 25–6 record, 14–4 in conference. This was the Boilermakers best record and first conference championship since 2010. They ended the year by winning 10 out of their last 12 games. Sophomore forward Caleb Swanigan was named Big Ten Player of the Year in a unanimous vote, the first Purdue player to win that award since JaJuan Johnson. They lost in their first game in the Big Ten tournament by the streaking Michigan who went on to win the championship. They received an at-large bid to the NCAA tournament as a No. 4 seed in where they defeated Vermont and Iowa State to advance to the Sweet Sixteen where they were defeated, 98–66, by the #1 seed Kansas.

==== 2017–18 season ====
Purdue came into the season off of a Sweet Sixteen appearance, accompanied by being the reigning Big Ten Conference men's basketball regular season champions, making expectations for the season. However, with the departure of Caleb Swanigan, the future was left uncertain. In the 2017–2018 season, Purdue, led by seniors Vince Edwards, Isaac Haas, PJ Thompson, Dakota Mathias and sophomore Carsen Edwards, spent several weeks at #3 while being on a program record and nation-leading 19-game winning streak. During that time, the Boilers led the nation in scoring margin, points per game, three-point shooting, and was one of only two teams with a top 3 ranking in both offensive and defensive efficiency. Purdue missed out on a consecutive B1G title after losing to Wisconsin, finishing 2nd in the conference at 15–3. The Boilers were seeded 3rd in the Big Ten tournament, where they beat Rutgers and Penn State to reach the Big Ten tournament Championship for the second time in three years. They faced a familiar opponent in Michigan, whom they had already faced two other times throughout that season, Purdue winning both meetings. However, Michigan beat Purdue 75–66 to become Big Ten tournament Champions for the second straight season.

Purdue was seeded 2nd in the East Region of the 2018 NCAA Division I men's basketball tournament, their highest seed in recent history. In the first round, they faced Cal State Fullerton Titans, winning 74–48. However, many Purdue fan's hearts broke in the second half of the game, as senior Center Isaac Haas fell on his elbow as he fought for a rebound, and broke his elbow as he hit the ground, ending his Purdue Basketball career. Purdue's second-round game was against Butler Bulldogs, whom Purdue had already played earlier in the season. The Boilers would win the game on a last second shot by Dakota Mathias, winning 76–73 to advance to the Sweet Sixteen for the second straight season. In the Sweet Sixteen, Purdue faced the third seeded Texas Tech Red Raiders. The Boilers would go on to lose in disappointing fashion 78–65, ending their season with 30 wins, the most wins in program history.

==== 2018–19 season ====
In 2019, Purdue was seeded 3rd in the South Region of the 2019 NCAA Division I men's basketball tournament, after another strong season. In the first round, they defeated a 26–8 Old Dominion team that was coming off a Conference USA championship for a 61–48 win. In the second round, they handedly defeated #6 seed Villanova, sending the defending champs home early after an 87–61 victory, and advancing to their third straight Sweet Sixteen in his tenure. The Boilermakers ran into their first real test with the #2 Tennessee Volunteers. After a back and forth contest that included 17 lead changes and needed overtime to be decided, Purdue came out victorious, beating the Vols 99–94 to reach their first Elite Eight in nearly 20 years. In the Elite Eight, Purdue faced the #1 seeded Virginia Cavaliers in what would be another back and forth thriller. After several lead changes throughout the game, Purdue led 70–67 with 5.9 seconds left and looked to be headed to their first Final Four since 1980 when Virginia's Ty Jerome missed the second free throw of two. Virginia was able to come up with the offensive rebound however, and after chasing down the loose ball, Mamadi Diakite nailed a last second jumpshot at the buzzer to send the game to overtime. The Boilers were once again looking towards the big dance, leading 75–74 with 43 seconds to go, but Virginia was able to hold Purdue scoreless the rest of overtime and prevailed 80–75, ending the Boilermakers' season with 26 wins and their first Elite Eight appearance since 2000.

==== 2019–20 season ====
In 2020, Purdue went 16–15 overall and 9–11 in Big Ten play, and the Boilers finished tied 10th in the Big Ten final standings. Postseason play was canceled due to COVID-19.

==== 2020–21 season ====
In 2021, Purdue finished with a record of 18–10 overall and 13–6 in the Big Ten. The Boilers finished 4th in the Big Ten final standings and received a 4 seed for the NCAA tournament. However, the Boilers suffered a disappointing defeat at the hands of 13th seed North Texas 78–69 in OT in the first round of the NCAA tournament.

==== 2021–22 season ====
Painter won his 372nd game as Purdue's head coach on January 8, over Penn State. This vaulted him past Hall of Famer Ward "Piggy" Lambert to become the second-winningest coach in Purdue history. Earlier, a victory in their conference opener over Iowa propelled the Boilermakers to No. 1 in both major polls for the first time in school history.

Purdue finished the season by losing to 15 seed Saint Peter's in the Sweet 16 of the NCAA tournament, which is the first time in NCAA history that a 15 seed has won in the Sweet 16.

==== 2022–23 season ====
On January 13, 2023, Painter became only the fifth coach in Big Ten history to win 400 games (his overall record at the milestone being 400–193).

Purdue finished the regular season 26–5 and 15–5 in conference play to win the regular season Big Ten title. They then won the Big Ten tournament, the first time in school history that Purdue won both the regular season and tournament titles in the same season. However, after receiving a #1 seed, Purdue finished the season by losing to #16 seed FDU in the Round of 64 of the NCAA Tournament. FDU was only the second #16 seed in NCAA tournament history to win a game. The FDU loss marked the third consecutive year that Purdue had lost to a double-digit seed in the NCAA Tournament.

==== 2023–24 season ====
Despite their first round exit in the 2023 tournament, Purdue came into the season with high expectations. They returned reigning National Player of the Year Zach Edey and were number 3 in the preseason AP poll, their highest preseason ranking since the 1987–88 season. On November 27, after winning the Maui Invitational, they made Big Ten history as the first team to be ranked number 1 in the AP Poll 3 consecutive seasons. The Boilermakers finished with 17 wins in conference play, the most in program history and most in Big Ten history since Indiana's 18 in 1976. Purdue went undefeated at home (16–0) for the fourth time in Mackey Arena history. The senior class ended with 59 victories in Big Ten play, tied for the most for any class in Big Ten History (Indiana, 1977).

Purdue was awarded a #1 seed for the second consecutive year in the 2024 NCAA Division I men's basketball tournament, this time in the Midwest Region. They cruised into the Sweet Sixteen with routs against 16 seed Grambling State, 78–50, and 8 seed Utah State, 106–67. With the victory against Utah State, they achieved their 31st win of the season, breaking the program record of most wins in a season. They then defeated 5 seed Gonzaga in Detroit 80–68, following a second-half surge, and moved on to the Elite Eight for the first time since 2019.

There the Boilermakers met a familiar opponent in the tournament on Easter Sunday, the 2 seeded Tennessee Volunteers, led by Dalton Knecht.

Zach Edey scored 40 points to go along with 16 rebounds, leading the Boilermakers to a 72–66 victory and a trip to the Final Four in Phoenix, the first under Matt Painter's tenure and the first since 1980.

The victory was a monumental day in the history of Purdue Men's basketball, with many in and around the team signifying the win as a watershed moment for the program by getting back to the Final Four after years of underachieving in the NCAA tournament. Former All-American Robbie Hummel was on the sideline for the radio broadcast of the game, and was moved to tears when embracing members of the Purdue coaching staff post game, including his former head coach Matt Painter.

Following the long-awaited trip to the Final Four in Phoenix, the Boilermakers faced off against surprise tournament Cinderella NC State led in part by tournament darling big man D. J. Burns. The Boilermakers controlled the game throughout and pulled away in the second half to win their first Final Four game since 1969 by a score of 63–50, advancing to the National Championship game for the first time in 55 years. There Purdue would eventually find the defending national champion UConn Huskies after their victory over Alabama in the later of the 2 Final Four games.

The 2024 NCAA Tournament would come down to a match up of two All-American level 7 footers, as UConn came into the championship game led in part by 7 foot 2 Donovan Clingan, leading to the game being billed as a matchup of 2 twin towers at the center position. Purdue kept the game close for most of the first half after entering the game a 6-point underdog, but was unable to rely on their usual three point shooting prowess (Going 1 for 7 from three point range) as UConn's elite perimeter defense made it difficult to convert their usual amount of three point shots. Zach Edey scored 37 points to go along with 10 rebounds in his final game at Purdue, but UConn pulled away in the second half to win their second consecutive national title 75–60.

==== 2025–26 season ====
On November 17, 2025, Painter achieved his 500th career win (his overall record at the milestone was 500–220) becoming one of only 21 active coaches with as many wins. On March 22, 2026, in the second round of the NCAA tournament, Painter notched his 500th win at Purdue.

== Head coaching record ==
Record table
Season	Team	Overall	Conference	Standing	Postseason
Southern Illinois Salukis (Missouri Valley Conference) (2003–2004)
2003–04	Southern Illinois	25–5	17–1	1st	NCAA Division I Round of 64
Southern Illinois:		25–5 (.833)	17–1 (.944)		
Purdue Boilermakers (Big Ten Conference) (2005–present)
2005–06	Purdue	9–19	3–13	11th	
2006–07	Purdue	22–12	9–7	T–4th	NCAA Division I Round of 32
2007–08	Purdue	25–9	15–3	2nd	NCAA Division I Round of 32
2008–09	Purdue	27–10	11–7	T–2nd	NCAA Division I Sweet 16
2009–10	Purdue	29–6	14–4	T–1st	NCAA Division I Sweet 16
2010–11	Purdue	26–8	14–4	2nd	NCAA Division I Round of 32
2011–12	Purdue	22–13	10–8	6th	NCAA Division I Round of 32
2012–13	Purdue	16–18	8–10	T–7th	CBI quarterfinal
2013–14	Purdue	15–17	5–13	12th	
2014–15	Purdue	21–13	12–6	T–3rd	NCAA Division I Round of 64
2015–16	Purdue	26–9	12–6	T–3rd	NCAA Division I Round of 64
2016–17	Purdue	27–8	14–4	1st	NCAA Division I Sweet 16
2017–18	Purdue	30–7	15–3	T–2nd	NCAA Division I Sweet 16
2018–19	Purdue	26–10	16–4	T–1st	NCAA Division I Elite Eight
2019–20	Purdue	16–15	9–11	T–10th	No postseason held
2020–21	Purdue	18–10	13–6	4th	NCAA Division I Round of 64
2021–22	Purdue	29–8	14–6	3rd	NCAA Division I Sweet 16
2022–23	Purdue	29–6	15–5	1st	NCAA Division I Round of 64
2023–24	Purdue	34–5	17–3	1st	NCAA Division I Runner-up
2024–25	Purdue	24–12	13–7	T–4th	NCAA Division I Sweet 16
2025–26	Purdue	30–9	13–7	T–6th	NCAA Division I Elite Eight
2026–27	Purdue	4–2	0–0		
Purdue:		505–226 (.691)	251–136 (.649)		
Total:		530–231 (.696)			
National champion Postseason invitational champion Conference regular season champion Conference regular season and conference tournament champion Division regular season champion Division regular season and conference tournament champion Conference tournament champion

== Personal life ==
Painter has been married to his wife Sherry since October 2018. He has three children and two stepchildren: Maggie, Brayden, Emma Painter, Connor Plevin and Abigail Plevin. Matt Painter is not related to former Purdue quarterback Curtis Painter.

In 1994, Painter had a brief role in the Nick Nolte film Blue Chips, playing for the fictitious "Coast" squad.

On May 7, 2009, he served as the honorary starter and waved the green flag for the starting round of qualifying at the Indianapolis 500 in Speedway, Indiana.

== See also ==
- List of NCAA Division I Men's Final Four appearances by coach
