= Blackhawk Christian School =

Location
- 7400 East State Boulevard, Fort Wayne, Indiana; United States; 41°6′21.14″N 85°2′46.07″W

Information
- Type: Private Christian
- Established: 1973
- Principal: Mark Harmon
- Grades: K-12
- Enrollment: 947 (2023-2024)
- Campus type: Suburban
- Color
- Mascot: Brave
- Website: Homepage

Blackhawk Christian School is a private K-12 Christian school in Fort Wayne, Indiana.

== Description ==
The school was established in 1973 in northeastern Fort Wayne, Indiana, and has an enrollment of approximately 950 students PK-12 and is operated by Blackhawk Ministries. The school's motto is "Preparing Hearts and Minds to Serve Christ" Mark Harmon is currently the principal of the Secondary School, Doug Pickett is principal of the Intermediate School, Kimberly Brown is the principal of the Primary School, and Kevin Newbry is the Head of Schools.

== Athletics ==
As a member of the IHSAA (Indiana High School Athletic Association), Blackhawk Christian School provides athletic competition in 20 sports at the high school level.

== Notable alumni ==
- Russell Byrd (2010), basketball player
- Caleb Furst (2021), basketball player

== See also ==
- List of high schools in Indiana
