= Silver Creek High School (Indiana) =

Location
- 557 Renz Avenue; Sellersburg, Indiana 47172; United States; 38.408°N 84.753°W

Information
- Type: Public high school
- School district: Silver Creek School Corporation
- Principal: Rob Willman
- Teaching staff: 58.50 (FTE)
- Grades: 9-12
- Enrollment: 943 (2023-2024)
- Student to teacher ratio: 16.12
- Color
- Athletics conference: Mid-Southern Conference
- Mascot: Dragon
- Website: Official Website

Silver Creek High School is a high school serving grades 9-12 located in Sellersburg, Indiana. It is part of the Silver Creek School Corporation, created in 2020 by the split of the West Clark Community Schools. The school colors are orange and blue, and the mascot is the Dragon.

== Athletics ==
Silver Creek's athletic teams are part of the 10-school Mid-Southern Conference. They have won four state championships.

State Championships
Sport	Year(s)
Baseball (1)	2023
Boys Basketball (2)	2019, 2021
Girls Basketball (1)	2021

== Notable alumni ==
- Steve Green (class of 1971) former NBA player.
- Trey Kaufman-Renn (class of 2021), college basketball player for the Purdue Boilermakers and Kansas Jayhawks
- Diego Morales (class of 2000), 63rd Secretary of State of Indiana

== See also ==
- List of high schools in Indiana
