= Purdue Boilermakers men's basketball =

Men's basketball team of Purdue University, Indiana, US

Purdue Boilermakers
| 2026–27 Purdue Boilermakers men's basketball team |
- University: Purdue University
- First season: 1896–97; 130 years ago
- Athletic director: Mike Bobinski
- Head coach: Matt Painter; 22nd season, 501–224 (.691)
- Location: West Lafayette, Indiana
- Arena: Mackey Arena (capacity: 14,804)
- NCAA division: Division I
- Conference: Big Ten Conference
- Nickname: Boilermakers
- Colors: Old gold and black
- Student section: The Paint Crew
- All-time record: 2,001–1,085 (.648)
- NCAA tournament record: 54–37 (.593)

NCAA Division I tournament runner-up
- 1969, 2024
Other NCAA Division I tournament results
| Third place | 1980 |
| Final Four | 1969, 1980, 2024 |
| Elite Eight | 1969, 1980, 1994, 2000, 2019, 2024, 2026 |
| Sweet Sixteen | 1969, 1980, 1988, 1994, 1998, 1999, 2000, 2009, 2010, 2017, 2018, 2019, 2022, 2024, 2025, 2026 |
| Appearances | 1969, 1977, 1980, 1983, 1984, 1985, 1986, 1987, 1988, 1990, 1991, 1993, 1994, 1995, 1996*, 1997, 1998, 1999, 2000, 2003, 2007, 2008, 2009, 2010, 2011, 2012, 2015, 2016, 2017, 2018, 2019, 2021, 2022, 2023, 2024, 2025, 2026 |

Pre-tournament Helms national champions
- 1931–32

NIT champions
- 1974

Conference tournament champions
- Big Ten: 2009, 2023, 2026

Conference regular-season champions
- Big Ten: 1911, 1912, 1921, 1922, 1926, 1928, 1930, 1932, 1934, 1935, 1936, 1938, 1940, 1969, 1979, 1984, 1987, 1988, 1994, 1995, 1996, 2010, 2017, 2019, 2023, 2024

Uniforms
| Home | Away | Alternate |
- * vacated by NCAA

The Purdue Boilermakers men's basketball team are the men's college basketball program that represent Purdue University. They compete in NCAA Division I and are a founding member of the Big Ten Conference.

Purdue basketball has the most Big Ten regular season championships with 26 conference titles, 3 Big Ten tournament championships, and in 2024 became the first Big Ten program to be ranked as the #1 team in America for three consecutive seasons. As of April 2024, Purdue also holds a winning record against all other Big Ten schools in head-to-head match ups.

The Boilermakers have reached three NCAA Tournament Final Fours and two NCAA championship games but have not won an NCAA Championship. The 1931–32 team was retroactively named a national champion by the Helms Athletic Foundation and was listed as the top team of the season by the Premo-Porretta Power Poll. Neither the Helms nor Premo-Porretta designations are recognized by the NCAA as official national championships, despite the NCAA referencing Helms's historical findings. Purdue has sent more than 30 players to the NBA, including two overall No. 1 picks in the NBA draft.

Purdue's main rival is the Indiana Hoosiers.

== History ==
=== 1896–1916: The early years ===
The history of Purdue basketball dates back to 1896 with their first game against the Lafayette YMCA, which they won 34–19. In the 1902–03 season, head coach C.I. Freeman, in his only season, led them to an undefeated 8–0 record. Upon conclusion of the season, the university recognized the popularity of the sport and made it part of the Purdue University Athletic Association. The Boilermakers began play in the Big Ten Conference three years later, with its first championship coming in 1911 under the direction of Ralph Jones.

=== 1917–1946: Ward Lambert era ===
In 1917, Ward "Piggy" Lambert, a former basketball player at Wabash College, was named head coach of the Boilermakers. What followed was one of the most dominant eras of Purdue Basketball on the conference and national level. Under Lambert, Purdue became a front-runner in the development of the fast-paced game as it is today. In 28 seasons, Lambert mentored 16 All-Americans and 31 First Team All-Big Ten selections, which included the 1932 National Player of the Year John Wooden. Wooden was the first college player to be named a Consensus All-American three times. Lambert compiled a career record of 371–152, a .709 winning percentage. His 228 wins in Big Ten play have been bested by only Indiana's Bob Knight, Michigan State's Tom Izzo, Purdue's current head coach Matt Painter, and former Purdue head coach Gene Keady. Lambert won an unprecedented 11 Big Ten Championships, which Bobby Knight later tied for most in conference history. In 1943, the Helms Athletic Foundation retroactively recognized Purdue as its national champion for 1932. The Premo-Porretta Power Poll later recognized the Boilermakers as the top team of the 1932 season as well. The NCAA, however, does not officially recognize this designation, although it does list the Helms findings in their record books.

=== 1950–1965: Ray Eddy era ===
Ward Lambert announced his resignation on January 23, 1946. That same year and the year following, under new head coach Mel Taube, Purdue won both meetings against coach John Wooden's Indiana State team. On February 24, 1947, three students were killed (one of whom died the next day) and 166 people were taken to hospitals after the 3,400-student section of the Purdue Fieldhouse collapsed during a game against Wisconsin.

Center Paul Hoffman became the only Boiler to be named a First Team-All Big Ten selection four times in 1947. With third overall-picked teammate Ed "Bulbs" Ehlers (who played for John Wooden at South Bend Central High School), the two were the first players in the program's history to be selected in the NBA draft, while Paul Hoffman became the BAA's (original title of the NBA) first player named Rookie of the Year in 1948.

After Mel Taube's four-and-a-half seasons, Ray Eddy, a former player and teammate of Wooden's under Lambert, took over as head coach. During his 15-year tenure, he coached Terry Dischinger and Dave Schellhase, both Consensus All-Americans, and Ernie Hall, the first Purdue junior college transfer and African-American player to wear a Boilermaker uniform. In 1955, his team played one of the longest games in college basketball history, lasting six overtimes in a loss to Minnesota.

=== 1966–1979: George King era ===
Over the next few decades the Boilermakers enjoyed moderate success, culminating in 1969 when they won their first conference title in 29 years and advanced to the 1969 NCAA Finals game under head coach George King and led by All-American Rick Mount, where they fell to former Purdue great John Wooden and his UCLA Bruins squad. Former Los Angeles Lakers coach/general manager, Fred Schaus, who also spent time as West Virginia's head coach, took over the program after George King stepped down to become solely the school's athletic director. Schaus led the Boilermakers to the 1974 NIT Championship, becoming the first Big Ten team to capture the NIT title. In the 1978–79 season, new head coach Lee Rose introduced Purdue basketball to a new approach with a slowed-down, controlled style of play. With All-American center Joe Barry Carroll, he led them to the 1979 NIT Finals and to a 1980 NCAA Final Four appearance.

=== 1980–2005: Gene Keady era ===
In 1980, Gene Keady, the head coach of Western Kentucky and former assistant to Eddie Sutton with the Arkansas Razorbacks, was named the new head coach of the Boilermakers. Over the next 25 years, Keady led the Boilermakers to six Big Ten Championships, 17 NCAA Tournament appearances with two Elite Eights and no Final Fours. Purdue received their highest Associated Press and Coaches Poll ranking in its program's history during the 1987–88 season, where they were ranked as high as 2nd in the nation. (They were ranked 1st in the nation for the first time during the 2021–2022 season.) In 1991, Keady and assistant coach Frank Kendrick recruited Glenn Robinson, who ultimately became an All-American and Purdue's second-named National Player of the Year. A few years later, Purdue managed to recruit the program's first of several foreign players when they picked up Matt ten Dam from the Netherlands. In December 1997, Keady became Purdue's all-time winningest head coach, surpassing Lambert with his 372nd win. He also became the second-winningest coach in Big Ten history behind Indiana's Bobby Knight, against whom Keady went 21–20 in head-to-head meetings. Soon afterward, the playing surface at Mackey Arena was named Keady Court in his honor.

Many of Keady's former assistant coaches and players throughout the years have gone on to enjoy success as head coaches. Included in the Gene Keady coaching tree is current Purdue head coach Matt Painter, former St. John's head coach Steve Lavin, former Pittsburgh head coach Kevin Stallings, former Kansas State head coach Bruce Weber, former Wisconsin-Green Bay head coach Linc Darner, former UNC Charlotte head coach Alan Major, former Missouri and current Missouri State head coach Cuonzo Martin, former Missouri State head coach and current Purdue assistant coach Paul Lusk, and former Illinois State head coach Dan Muller.

Following the 1998–99 season, the NCAA placed Purdue on two years' probation due to minor violations over recruiting, benefits, and ethics. Purdue also lost one scholarship per season for the 2000–01 and 2001–02 seasons. Most severely, Purdue assistant Frank Kendrick was found to have provided an illegal benefit to Purdue player Luther Clay, who transferred to Rhode Island after his freshman year, namely a $4,000 bank loan. Clay was found to be ineligible due to his extra benefit, so Purdue forfeited all 19 victories in which Clay played, including one win in the 1996 NCAA tournament.

=== 2005–present: Matt Painter era ===
Matt Painter played for Gene Keady during the early 1990s, with Keady naming him captain in his senior year in 1993. After one season at Southern Illinois as the head coach after Bruce Weber left north for Illinois, Painter was hired as a planned replacement for Keady for the 2004–05 season as Keady's associate head coach. After a first season marred with injuries and suspensions from off-court altercations, Painter re-energized Purdue basketball in the summer of 2006 by signing the top recruiting class in the conference and made one of the biggest turnarounds in the program's history. His "Baby Boilers" developed into three eventual All-Americans, including 2011 consensus selection JaJuan Johnson, that led Purdue to four consecutive NCAA Tournaments and back-to-back Sweet Sixteen appearances, a Big Ten title, and a conference tournament championship.

During the 2010 season, Matt Painter led the Boilermakers to a school record-tying 14–0 start, as well with the most wins in a season with a 29–6 record and a Big Ten title. The season ended in disappointment, however, as Junior Robbie Hummel was sidelined with an ACL injury in February of that season. The following year anticipated the return of Hummel, E'Twaun Moore, and Johnson. This excitement was quickly tempered when Hummel re-tore his ACL on the first practice of the season, sidelining him for its duration once again. Despite Hummel's absence, Purdue remained in the top ten most of the season, being ranked as high as 6th and finished the regular season with a 26–8 record. At the conclusion of the 2010–2011 season, Johnson and Moore declared for the NBA draft. On June 23, 2011, both Johnson and Moore were drafted to the Boston Celtics in the first and second rounds, respectively.

Purdue began the 2012 season with a 12–3 record, holding the fifth best home winning streak in the nation with 27, before leading the nation with the fewest turnover average per game. The home winning streak was lost during the 2012 season to Alabama. They finished with a 10–8 conference record, giving Purdue its sixth consecutive 22+ win season, the best in the program's history. In the 2012 NBA draft, Robbie Hummel was the 58th overall pick by the Minnesota Timberwolves. The following two seasons brought slim success, missing out on both the NCAA Tournament and the NIT. They accepted a bid in the 2013 CBI, where they lost in the second round to Santa Clara. After a moderate 8–5 preseason campaign during the 2015 season, Purdue finished 3rd in the conference after finishing last the season prior. The 2015 season ended after losing to Cincinnati in overtime. It was the first time the program lost its opener in the NCAA Tournament since 1993, breaking a 14-game win streak. After making it back to the NCAA tourney, the program landed its biggest recruit in nearly a quarter century when Fort Wayne native Caleb Swanigan, a top ten recruit, de-committed from Michigan State. They opened the 2016 season with an 11–0 record, while setting a program record with consecutive double-digit victories and were ranked as high as 9th in the nation. That season ended with an NCAA First Round loss to Little Rock with a 26–9 record. In May 2016, it was announced that the 2017–18 Purdue team would represent the U.S. at the 2017 World University Games in Taipei. The team went on to win the silver medal at the Games, winning every game until losing to Lithuania in the gold medal game.

Purdue won the outright 2017 Big Ten Conference title, along with Caleb Swanigan being named unanimous B1G Player of the Year. In the 2017 NCAA Tournament, Purdue reached the Sweet Sixteen, losing to #1 seed Kansas. In the 2017–2018 season, Purdue, led by seniors Vince Edwards, Isaac Haas, PJ Thompson, Dakota Mathias and sophomore Carsen Edwards, spent several weeks at #3 while being on a program record and nation-leading 19-game winning streak. During that time, the Boilers led the nation in scoring margin, points per game, three-point shooting, and was one of only two teams with a top 3 ranking in both offensive and defensive efficiency. Purdue missed out on a consecutive B1G title after losing to Wisconsin, finishing 2nd in the conference at 15–3. The Boilers were seeded 4th in the Big Ten tournament, where they beat Rutgers and Penn State to reach the Big Ten tournament Championship for the second time in three years. They faced a familiar opponent in Michigan, whom they had already faced two other times throughout that season, Purdue winning both meetings. However, Michigan beat Purdue 75–66 to become Big Ten tournament Champions for the second straight season.

Purdue was seeded 2nd in the East Region of the 2018 NCAA Division I men's basketball tournament, their highest seed in recent history. In the first round, they faced Cal State Fullerton Titans, winning 74–48. However, many Purdue fan's hearts broke in the second half of the game, as senior Center Isaac Haas fell on his elbow as he fought for a rebound, and broke his elbow as he hit the ground, ending his Purdue Basketball career. Purdue's second-round game was against Butler Bulldogs, whom Purdue had already played earlier in the season. The Boilers won the game on a last second shot by Dakota Mathias, winning 76–73 to advance to the Sweet Sixteen for the second straight season. In the Sweet Sixteen, Purdue faced the third seeded Texas Tech Red Raiders. The Boilers went on to lose 65–78, ending their season with 30 wins.

In 2019, Purdue was seeded 3rd in the South Region of the 2019 NCAA Division I men's basketball tournament, after another strong season. In the first round, they eliminated a 26–8 Old Dominion team that was coming off a Conference USA championship, winning 61–48. In the second round, they defeated #6 seed Villanova, sending the defending champs home early after an 87–61 victory, and advancing to their third straight Sweet Sixteen under Matt Painter. The Boilermakers ran into their first real test with the #2 Tennessee Volunteers. After a back and forth contest that included 17 lead changes and needed overtime to be decided, Purdue came out victorious, barely beating the Vols 99–94 to reach their first Elite Eight in nearly 20 years. In the Elite Eight, Purdue faced the #1 seeded Virginia Cavaliers in what was another back and forth thriller.

After several lead changes throughout the game, and a 40-point effort from Carsen Edwards including 10 made 3s, Purdue led 70–67 with 5.9 seconds left and looked to be headed to their first Final Four since 1980. Virginia's Ty Jerome was fouled intentionally, and missed the second free throw of two after making the first. Virginia was able to come up with the offensive rebound, and after chasing down the loose ball that had gone into the Virginia back court, toss the ball to Mamadi Diakite who hit a free-throw line floater at the buzzer to send the game to overtime tied 70–70. The Boilermakers once again looked to be en route to the Final Four, leading 75–74 with 43 seconds to go. However Virginia was able to hold Purdue scoreless over the final minute and prevailed 80–75, ending the Boilermakers season with 26 wins and their first Elite Eight appearance since 2000.

After the cancellation of the 2020 NCAA Division I men's basketball tournament, Purdue picked up where they had left off in 2019, only this time they were the 4th seed in the South region of the 2021 NCAA Division I men's basketball tournament. Their first-round matchup was against 13th-seeded North Texas, where they came back from behind 32–24 at the half to send the game to OT. Ultimately, once there, Purdue couldn't score until the last 30 seconds of overtime, and North Texas pulled off the 78–69 upset.

The 2022 season saw the Boilermakers reach #1 in the AP Poll for the first time in program history, led by senior Trevion Williams, and All-American sophomore guard Jaden Ivey. In the 2022 tournament, Purdue reached the Sweet Sixteen after a second round win over Texas, only to lose to the Cinderella story of that year's tournament, the 15-seeded Saint Peter's Peacocks.

The following year, Purdue put together a 29–5 season that again had them reach #1 in the AP poll at various points in the season, and saw them win the Big 10 regular-season championship for a record extending 25th time, and postseason tournament championship for the first time since 2009, leading to a #1 seed in the East Region of the 2023 NCAA Tournament.

Center Zach Edey was also voted the third player in Purdue history to win National Player of the Year honors. Purdue would then became the second team in NCAA Tournament history to be upset by a 16-seed, falling 63–58 to Fairleigh Dickinson in the First Round, suffering the biggest upset in NCAA tournament history with Purdue being 23 1/2-point favorites heading into the game.

The 2024 saw the Boilermakers winning their second consecutive outright Big Ten regular season championship, extending their Big Ten record to 26 titles. Zach Edey was named National Player of the Year unanimously for the second straight season, becoming the first men's college basketball player to win the award in back-to-back years since Ralph Sampson in 1983.

Purdue was awarded a #1 seed for the second consecutive year in the 2024 NCAA Division I men's basketball tournament, this time in the Midwest Region. They cruised into the Sweet Sixteen with routs against 16 seed Grambling State, 78–50, and 8 seed Utah State, 106–67. With the victory against Utah State, they achieved their 31st win of the season, breaking the program record of most wins in a season. They then defeated 5 seed Gonzaga in Detroit 80–68, following a second-half surge, and moved on to the Elite Eight for the first time since 2019.

On Easter Sunday, the Boilermakers faced the 2 seeded Tennessee Volunteers, led by Dalton Knecht. Zach Edey scored 40 points to go along with 16 rebounds, leading the Boilermakers to a thrilling 72–66 victory and a trip to the Final Four in Phoenix, the first under Matt Painter's tenure and the first since 1980.

The victory was a monumental day in the history of Purdue Men's basketball, with many in and around the team signifying the win as a watershed moment for the program by getting back to the Final Four after years of underachieving in the NCAA tournament. Former All-American Robbie Hummel was on the sideline for the radio broadcast of the game, and was moved to tears when embracing members of the Purdue coaching staff post game, including his former head coach Matt Painter.

Following the long-awaited trip to the Final Four in Phoenix, the Boilermakers faced off against surprise tournament Cinderella NC State led in part by tournament darling big man D. J. Burns. The Boilermakers controlled the game throughout and pulled away in the second half to win their first Final Four game since 1969 by a score of 63–50, advancing to the National Championship game for the first time in 55 years. There Purdue would eventually find the defending national champion UConn Huskies after their victory over Alabama in the later of the 2 Final Four games.

The 2024 NCAA Tournament would come down to a match up of two All-American level 7 footers, as UConn came into the championship game led in part by 7 foot 2 Donovan Clingan, leading to the game being billed as a matchup of 2 twin towers at the center position. Purdue kept the game close for most of the first half after entering the game a 6-point underdog, but was unable to rely on their usual three point shooting prowess (Going 1 for 7 from three point range) as UConn's elite perimeter defense made it difficult to convert their usual amount of three point shots. Zach Edey scored 37 points to go along with 10 rebounds in his final game at Purdue, but UConn pulled away in the second half to win their second consecutive national title 75–60.

Following the conclusion of the season, Zach Edey would declare for the 2024 NBA Draft, leaving the program as Purdue's all-time leader in points, rebounds, and field goal percentage.

2024-25 marked the 20th season as head coach for Matt Painter. The Boilermakers finished with a 24‑12 overall record and a 13‑7 record in Big Ten play. They tied for fourth in the Big Ten regular‐season standings, but tiebreakers dropped them to a 6 seed in the Big Ten Tournament. In the conference tournament, Purdue won its second‑round game over USC, then lost in the quarterfinals to Michigan.

In the NCAA Tournament, they were awarded an at‑large bid as the No. 4 seed in the Midwest region. They won their first two games (over High Point and McNeese State) to reach the Sweet Sixteen, before being eliminated by the Houston Cougars, who would go on to be the national runner‑up later in the tournament.

Following the regular season, Braden Smith was named the Big Ten's Men's player of the year, the 6th different Boilermaker to win the award, also marking the 3rd year in a row a player from Purdue had taken home the honor.

The 2025–2026 season commenced with Purdue being ranked the Preseason #1. Led by Seniors Braden Smith and Trey Kaufman-Renn The Boilers started off hot, winning their first 8 games, including a 30-point win over the #18 Texas Tech Red Raiders to win the Baha Mar Invitational. Purdue eventually finished the regular season 7th in the Big Ten standings, but beat Northwestern, UCLA, and Big Ten regular season champions Michigan to take their third Big Ten Men's Tournament Title. They entered the 2026 NCAA Division I men's basketball tournament as a 2-seed, facing off against the Queens Royals. At the start of the tournament, Purdue Senior point guard Braden Smith was only 1 assist away from tying the all-time NCAA record, held by Bobby Hurley with 1,076. Purdue handled them with ease, winning 104–71, with Smith officially becoming the All-Time Leader in Assists. They would go on to face the Miami Hurricanes in the second round.

== Boilermaker home courts ==
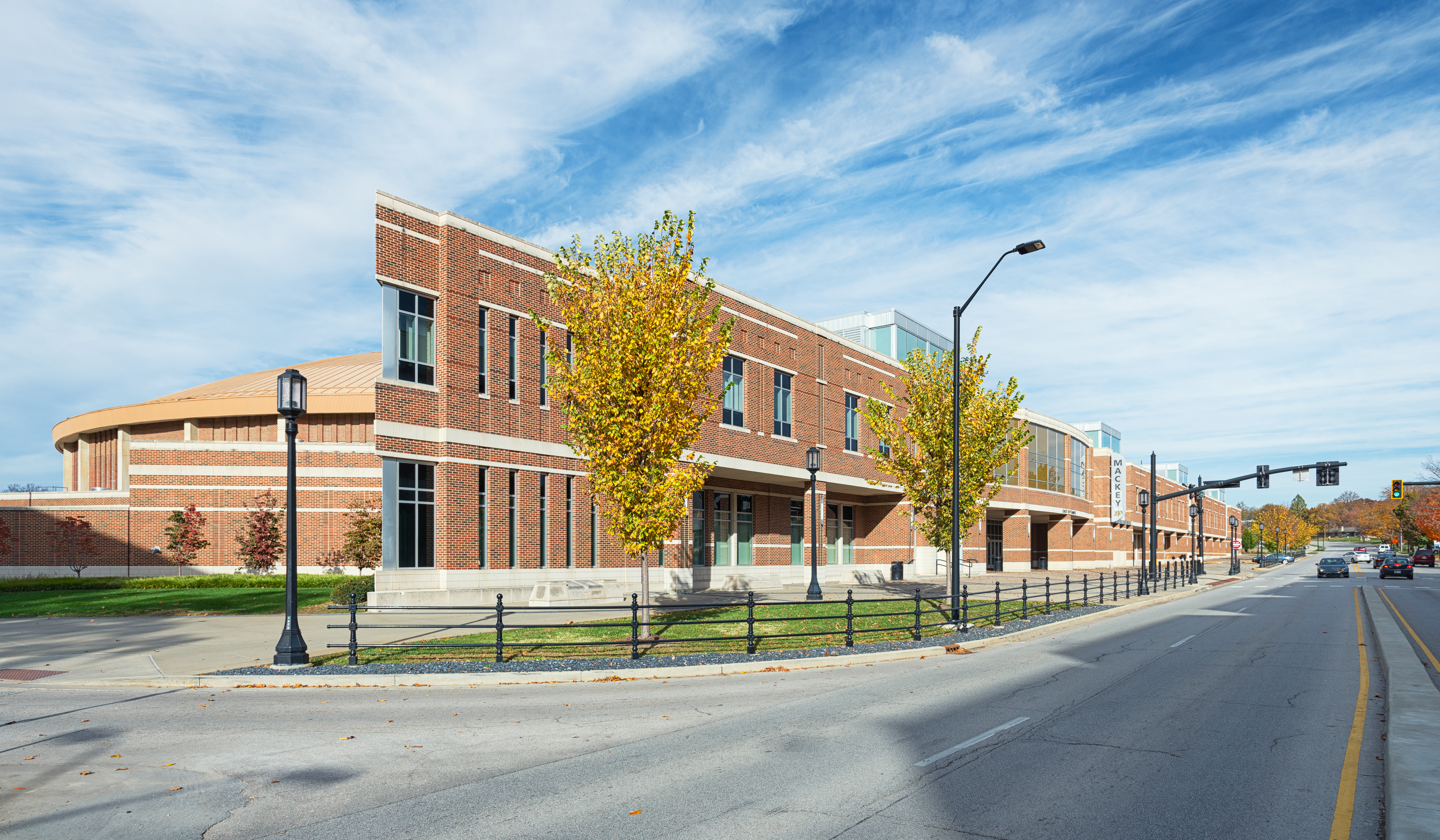
Mackey Arena, located on the north side of Purdue University's campus in West Lafayette, Indiana

- Mackey Arena (formerly Purdue Arena) 1967–present
- Lambert Fieldhouse (formerly Purdue Fieldhouse) 1937–1967
- Lafayette Jefferson High School Gymnasium 1929, 1934–1937
- Memorial Gymnasium 1909–1934
- Lafayette Colliseum

== Current staff ==
| Name | Position |
|---|---|
| Matt Painter | Head coach |
| P.J. Thompson | Associate Head Coach |
| Paul Lusk | Assistant Coach |
| Kenneth Lowe | Assistant Coach |
| Brandon Brantley | Assistant Coach |
| Elliot Bloom | Director of Basketball Administration and Operations |
| Jason Kabo | Director of Strength and Conditioning |
| Nick Terruso | Director of Video Services |
| Sasha Stefanovic | Director of Player Personnel |
| Chad Young | Athletic Trainer |
| Tommy Luce | Graduate Assistant |
| Jared Wulbrun | Graduate Assistant |

== Results by season (1980–present) ==
Record table
| Season | Team | Overall | Conference | Standing | Postseason |
|---|---|---|---|---|---|
Gene Keady (Big Ten Conference) (1980–2005)
| 1980–81 | Gene Keady | 23–10 | 10–8 | 4th | NIT Semifinals |
| 1981–82 | Gene Keady | 18–14 | 11–7 | 5th | NIT Finals |
| 1982–83 | Gene Keady | 21–9 | 11–7 | 2nd | NCAA Second Round |
| 1983–84 | Gene Keady | 22–7 | 15–3 | 1st | NCAA Second Round |
| 1984–85 | Gene Keady | 20–9 | 11–7 | 5th | NCAA First Round |
| 1985–86 | Gene Keady | 22–10 | 11–7 | 4th | NCAA First Round |
| 1986–87 | Gene Keady | 25–5 | 15–3 | 1st | NCAA Second Round |
| 1987–88 | Gene Keady | 29–4 | 16–2 | 1st | NCAA Sweet Sixteen |
| 1988–89 | Gene Keady | 15–16 | 8–10 | 6th | |
| 1989–90 | Gene Keady | 22–8 | 13–5 | 2nd | NCAA Second Round |
| 1990–91 | Gene Keady | 17–12 | 9–9 | 5th | NCAA First Round |
| 1991–92 | Gene Keady | 18–15 | 8–10 | 6th | NIT Quarterfinals |
| 1992–93 | Gene Keady | 18–10 | 9–9 | 5th | NCAA First Round |
| 1993–94 | Gene Keady | 29–5 | 14–4 | 1st | NCAA Elite Eight |
| 1994–95 | Gene Keady | 25–7 | 15–3 | 1st | NCAA Second Round |
| 1995–96 | Gene Keady | 7–23* | 6–12* | 1st | NCAA Second Round |
| 1996–97 | Gene Keady | 18–12 | 12–6 | 2nd | NCAA Second Round |
| 1997–98 | Gene Keady | 28–8 | 12–4 | 3rd | NCAA Sweet Sixteen |
| 1998–99 | Gene Keady | 21–13 | 7–9 | 7th | NCAA Sweet Sixteen |
| 1999–00 | Gene Keady | 24–10 | 12–4 | 3rd | NCAA Elite Eight |
| 2000–01 | Gene Keady | 17–15 | 6–10 | 8th | NIT Quarterfinals |
| 2001–02 | Gene Keady | 13–18 | 5–11 | 8th | |
| 2002–03 | Gene Keady | 19–11 | 10–6 | 3rd | NCAA Second Round |
| 2003–04 | Gene Keady | 17–14 | 7–9 | 7th | NIT First Round |
| 2004–05 | Gene Keady | 7–21 | 3–13 | 10th | |
| Gene Keady: | | 493–270 | 256–169 | | |
Matt Painter (Big Ten Conference) (2005–Present)
| 2005–06 | Matt Painter | 9–19 | 3–13 | 11th | |
| 2006–07 | Matt Painter | 22-12 | 9–7 | 4th | NCAA Second Round |
| 2007–08 | Matt Painter | 25-9 | 15–3 | 2nd | NCAA Second Round |
| 2008–09 | Matt Painter | 27–10 | 11–7 | 2nd | NCAA Sweet Sixteen |
| 2009–10 | Matt Painter | 29–6 | 14–4 | 1st | NCAA Sweet Sixteen |
| 2010–11 | Matt Painter | 26–8 | 14–4 | 2nd | NCAA Second Round |
| 2011–12 | Matt Painter | 22–13 | 10–8 | 6th | NCAA Second Round |
| 2012–13 | Matt Painter | 16–18 | 8–10 | T-7th | CBI Quarterfinals |
| 2013–14 | Matt Painter | 15–17 | 5–13 | 12th | |
| 2014–15 | Matt Painter | 21–13 | 12–6 | T-3rd | NCAA First Round |
| 2015–16 | Matt Painter | 26–9 | 12–6 | T-3rd | NCAA First Round |
| 2016–17 | Matt Painter | 27–8 | 14–4 | 1st | NCAA Sweet Sixteen |
| 2017–18 | Matt Painter | 30–7 | 15–3 | T-2nd | NCAA Sweet Sixteen |
| 2018–19 | Matt Painter | 26–10 | 16–4 | T-1st | NCAA Elite Eight |
| 2019–20 | Matt Painter | 16–15 | 9–11 | T-10th | Tournaments canceled |
| 2020–21 | Matt Painter | 18–10 | 13–6 | 4th | NCAA First Round |
| 2021–22 | Matt Painter | 29–8 | 14–6 | 3rd | NCAA Sweet Sixteen |
| 2022–23 | Matt Painter | 29–5 | 15–5 | 1st | NCAA First round |
| 2023–24 | Matt Painter | 34–5 | 17–3 | 1st | NCAA Division I Runner Up |
| 2024–25 | Matt Painter | 24–11 | 13–7 | T-4th | NCAA Sweet Sixteen |
| 2025–26 | Matt Painter | 30-9 | 13–7 | T-6th | NCAA Elite Eight |
| Matt Painter: | | 501–224 | 252–137 | | |
| Total: | | 2001–1085 | | | |
National champion Postseason invitational champion Conference regular season champion Conference regular season and conference tournament champion Division regular season champion Division regular season and conference tournament champion Conference tournament champion

*Purdue forfeited 18 regular season wins (6 conference wins) and vacated 1 NCAA Tournament win and 1 NCAA Tournament loss due to use of an ineligible player for during the 1995–96 season.

== Postseason ==
=== NCAA tournament results ===
The Boilermakers have appeared in the NCAA tournament 37 times. Their combined record is 53–37; due to use of an ineligible player, Purdue vacated one win and one loss from the 1996 NCAA tournament, resulting in an adjusted official NCAA tournament record of 52–36.

| Year | Seed | Round | Opponent | Result |
|---|---|---|---|---|
| 1969 | | Sweet Sixteen; Elite Eight; Final Four; National Championship | Miami (OH); Marquette; North Carolina; UCLA | W 91–71; W 75–73; W 92–65; L 72–92 |
| 1977 | | First Round | North Carolina | L 66–69 |
| 1980 | #6 | First Round; Second Round; Sweet Sixteen; Elite Eight; Final Four; National 3rd Place Game | #11 La Salle #3 St. John's #2 Indiana #4 Duke #8 UCLA #5 Iowa | W 90–82; W 87–72; W 76–69; W 68–60; L 62–67; W 75–58 |
| 1983 | #5 | First Round; Second Round | #12 Robert Morris #4 Arkansas | W 55–53; L 68–78 |
| 1984 | #3 | Second Round | #6 Memphis | L 48–66 |
| 1985 | #6 | First Round | #11 Auburn | L 58–59 |
| 1986 | #6 | First Round | #11 LSU | L 87–94 ^{2OT} |
| 1987 | #3 | First Round; Second Round | #14 Northeastern #6 Florida | W 104–95; L 66–85 |
| 1988 | #1 | First Round; Second Round; Sweet Sixteen | #16 Fairleigh Dickinson #9 Memphis #4 Kansas State | W 94–79; W 100–73; L 70–73 |
| 1990 | #2 | First Round; Second Round | #15 Northeast Louisiana #10 Texas | W 75–63; L 72–73 |
| 1991 | #7 | First Round | #10 Temple | L 63–80 |
| 1993 | #9 | First Round | #8 Rhode Island | L 68–74 |
| 1994 | #1 | First Round; Second Round; Sweet Sixteen; Elite Eight | #16 UCF #9 Alabama #4 Kansas #2 Duke | W 98–67; W 83–73; W 83–78; L 60–69 |
| 1995 | #3 | First Round; Second Round | #14 Green Bay #6 Memphis | W 49–48; L 73–75 |
| 1996 | #1 | First Round; Second Round | #16 Western Carolina #8 Georgia | W 73–71*; L 69–76* |
| 1997 | #8 | First Round; Second Round | #9 Rhode Island #1 Kansas | W 83–76 ^{OT} L 61–75 |
| 1998 | #2 | First Round; Second Round; Sweet Sixteen | #15 Delaware #10 Detroit #3 Stanford | W 95–56; W 80–65; L 59–67 |
| 1999 | #10 | First Round; Second Round; Sweet Sixteen | #7 Texas #2 Miami (FL) #6 Temple | W 58–54; W 73–63; L 55–77 |
| 2000 | #6 | First Round; Second Round; Sweet Sixteen; Elite Eight | #11 Dayton #3 Oklahoma #10 Gonzaga #8 Wisconsin | W 62–61; W 66–62; W 75–66; L 60–64 |
| 2003 | #9 | First Round; Second Round | #8 LSU #1 Texas | W 80–56; L 67–77 |
| 2007 | #9 | First Round; Second Round | #8 Arizona #1 Florida | W 72–63; L 67–74 |
| 2008 | #6 | First Round; Second Round | #11 Baylor #3 Xavier | W 90–79; L 78–85 |
| 2009 | #5 | First Round; Second Round; Sweet Sixteen | #12 Northern Iowa #4 Washington #1 Connecticut | W 61–56; W 76–74; L 60–72 |
| 2010 | #4 | First Round; Second Round; Sweet Sixteen | #13 Siena #5 Texas A&M #1 Duke | W 72–64; W 63–61 ^{OT} L 57–70 |
| 2011 | #3 | First Round; Second Round | #14 Saint Peter's #11 VCU | W 65–43; L 76–94 |
| 2012 | #10 | First Round; Second Round | #7 Saint Mary's #2 Kansas | W 72–69; L 60–63 |
| 2015 | #9 | First Round | #8 Cincinnati | L 65–66 ^{OT} |
| 2016 | #5 | First Round | #12 Little Rock | L 83–85 ^{2OT} |
| 2017 | #4 | First Round; Second Round; Sweet Sixteen | #13 Vermont #5 Iowa State #1 Kansas | W 80–70; W 80–76; L 66–98 |
| 2018 | #2 | First Round; Second Round; Sweet Sixteen | #15 Cal State Fullerton #10 Butler #3 Texas Tech | W 74–48; W 76–73; L 65–78 |
| 2019 | #3 | First Round; Second Round; Sweet Sixteen; Elite Eight | #14 Old Dominion #6 Villanova #2 Tennessee #1 Virginia | W 61–48; W 87–61; W 99–94 ^{OT} L 75–80 ^{OT} |
| 2021 | #4 | First Round | #13 North Texas | L 69–78 ^{OT} |
| 2022 | #3 | First Round; Second Round; Sweet Sixteen | #14 Yale #6 Texas #15 Saint Peter's | W 78–56; W 81–71; L 64–67 |
| 2023 | #1 | First Round | #16 Fairleigh Dickinson | L 58–63 |
| 2024 | #1 | First Round; Second Round; Sweet Sixteen; Elite Eight; Final Four; National Championship | #16 Grambling State #8 Utah State #5 Gonzaga #2 Tennessee #11 NC State #1 Connecticut | W 78–50; W 106–67; W 80–68; W 72–66; W 63–50; L 60–75 |
| 2025 | #4 | First Round; Second Round; Sweet Sixteen | #13 High Point #12 McNeese State #1 Houston | W 75–63; W 76–62; L 60–62 |
| 2026 | #2 | First Round; Second Round; Sweet Sixteen; Elite Eight | #15 Queens #7 Miami #11 Texas #1 Arizona | W 104–71; W 79–69; W 79–77; L 64–79 |

*Purdue vacated one win and one loss from the 1996 NCAA Tournament due to use of an ineligible player, resulting in an adjusted official NCAA Tournament record of 49–35.

=== NIT results ===
The Boilermakers have appeared in the National Invitation Tournament (NIT) eight times. Their combined record is 20–7. They were NIT champions in 1974.

| Year | Round | Opponent | Result |
|---|---|---|---|
| 1971 | First Round | St. Bonaventure | L 79–94 |
| 1974 | First Round; Quarterfinals; Semifinals; Final | North Carolina; Hawaiʻi; Jacksonville; Utah | W 82–71; W 85–72; W 78–63; W 87–81 |
| 1979 | First Round; Second Round; Quarterfinals; Semifinals; Final | Central Michigan; Dayton; Old Dominion; Alabama; Indiana | W 97–80; W 84–70; W 67–59; W 87–68; L 52–53 |
| 1981 | First Round; Second Round; Quarterfinals; Semifinals; 3rd Place Game | Rhode Island; Dayton; Duke; Syracuse; West Virginia | W 84–58; W 50–46; W 81–69; L 63–70; W 75–72 |
| 1982 | First Round; Second Round; Quarterfinals; Semifinals; Final | WKU; Rutgers; Texas A&M; Georgia; Bradley | W 72–65; W 98–65; W 86–69; W 61–60; L 58–67 |
| 1992 | First Round; Second Round; Quarterfinals | Butler; TCU; Florida | W 82–56; W 67–51; L 52–73 |
| 2001 | First Round; Second Round; Quarterfinals | Illinois State; Auburn; Alabama | W 90–79; W 90–60; L 77–85 |
| 2004 | First Round | Notre Dame | L 59–71 |

=== CBI results ===
The Boilermakers have appeared in the College Basketball Invitational (CBI) one time. Their record is 1–1.

| Year | Round | Opponent | Result |
|---|---|---|---|
| 2013 | First Round; Quarterfinals | Western Illinois; Santa Clara | W 81–67; L 83–86 |

=== NCIT results ===
The Boilermakers appeared in one of the only two ever National Commissioners Invitational Tournaments. Their record is 1–1.

| Year | Round | Opponent | Result |
|---|---|---|---|
| 1975 | Quarterfinals; Semifinals | Missouri; Arizona | W 87–74; L 96–102 |

== Awards and honors ==
=== National Awards ===
==== Consensus National Player of the Year (4) ====
- John Wooden (1932)
- Glenn Robinson (1994)
- Zach Edey (2023, 2024)

==== Helms Foundation College Basketball Player of the Year (1) ====
- John Wooden (1932)

==== Sporting News Men's College Basketball Player of the Year (3) ====
- Glenn Robinson (1994)
- Zach Edey (2023, 2024)

==== UPI College Basketball Player of the Year (1) ====
- Glenn Robinson (1994)

==== Oscar Robertson Trophy (2) ====
- Glenn Robinson (1994)
- Zach Edey (2023, 2024)

==== Associated Press College Basketball Player of the Year (2) ====
- Glenn Robinson (1994)
- Zach Edey (2023, 2024)

==== Adolph Rupp Trophy (1) ====
- Glenn Robinson (1994)

==== NABC Player of the Year (2) ====
- Glenn Robinson (1994)
- Zach Edey (2023, 2024)

==== Naismith College Player of the Year (3) ====
- Glenn Robinson (1994)
- Zach Edey (2023, 2024)

==== John R. Wooden Award (2) ====
- Glenn Robinson (1994)
- Zach Edey (2023, 2024)

==== Basketball Times Player of the Year (1) ====
- Glenn Robinson (1994)
- Caleb Swanigan (2017)

==== Pete Newell Big Man Award (4) ====
- JaJuan Johnson (2011)
- Caleb Swanigan (2017)
- Zach Edey (2023, 2024)

==== Bob Cousy Award (1) ====
- Braden Smith (2025)

==== Jerry West Award (1) ====
- Carsen Edwards (2018)

==== Kareem Abdul-Jabbar Award (2) ====
- Zach Edey (2023, 2024)

==== Frances Pomeroy Naismith Award (1) ====
- Billy Keller (1969)

==== Senior CLASS Award (1) ====
- Robbie Hummel (2012)

==== National Scoring champions (3) ====
- Dave Schellhase (1966)
- Glenn Robinson (1994)
- Zach Edey (2024)

==== Naismith Memorial Basketball Hall of Fame (5) ====
- Ward Lambert (1960 as coach)
- Charles Murphy (1960 as player)
- John Wooden (1960 as player, 1972 as coach)
- Terry Dischinger (2010 as member of the 1960 Olympic team)
- Gene Keady (2023 as coach)

==== National Collegiate Basketball Hall of Fame (6) ====
- Ward Lambert (2006 as coach)
- Charles Murphy (2006 as player)
- John Wooden (2006 as player, 2006 as coach)
- Gene Keady (2013 as coach)
- Rick Mount (2017 as player)
- Terry Dischinger (2019 as player)

==== John R. Wooden Legends of Coaching Award (1) ====
- Gene Keady (2007)

==== Henry Iba Award (2) ====
- Gene Keady (1984, 1996)

==== NABC Coach of the Year (3) ====
- Gene Keady (1994, 2000)
- Matt Painter (2019)

=== All-Americans ===
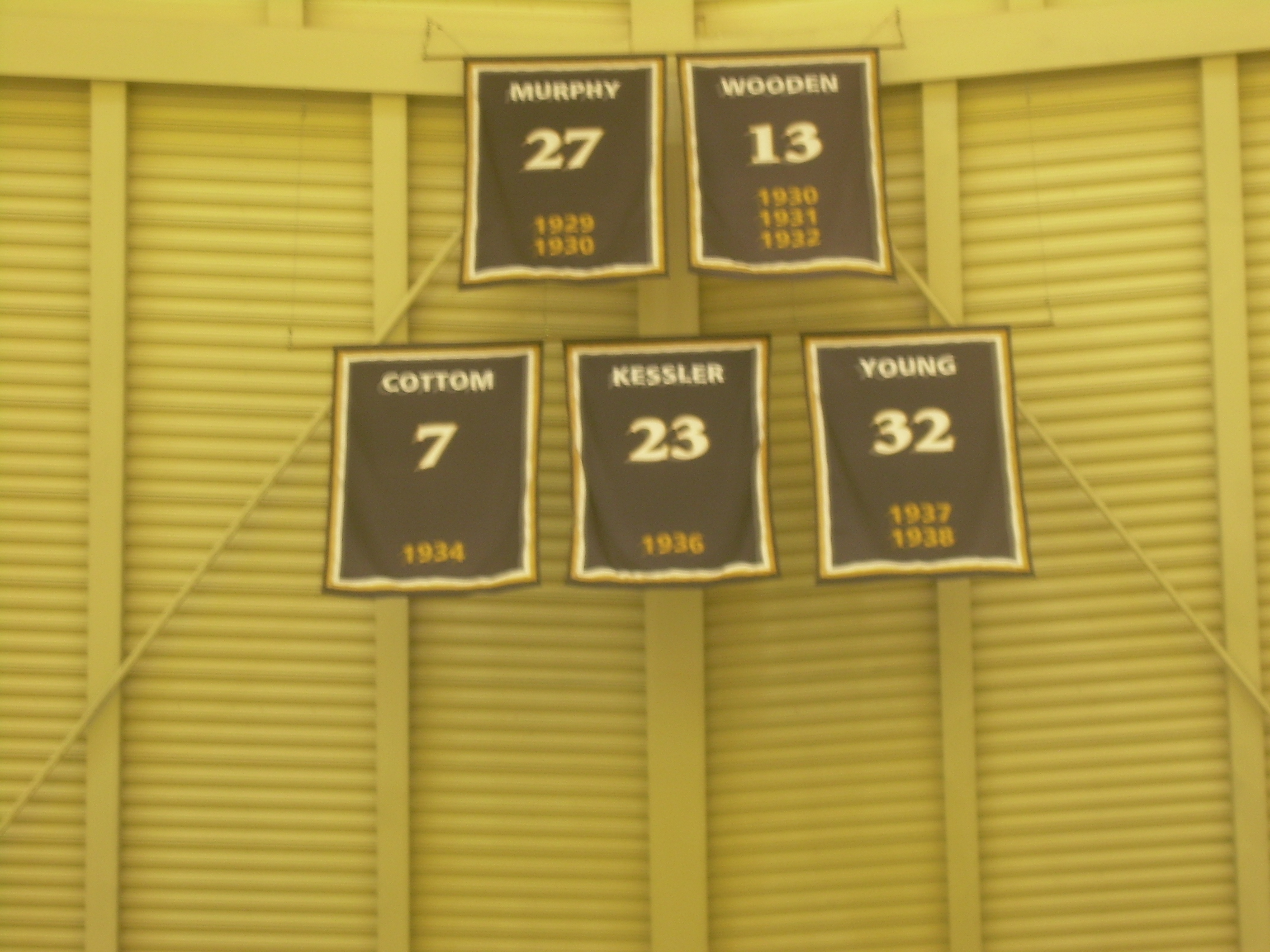
Honored players' banners as displayed at Mackey Arena: Charles "Stretch" Murphy, John Wooden, Norm Cottom, Robert Kessler, and Jewell Young

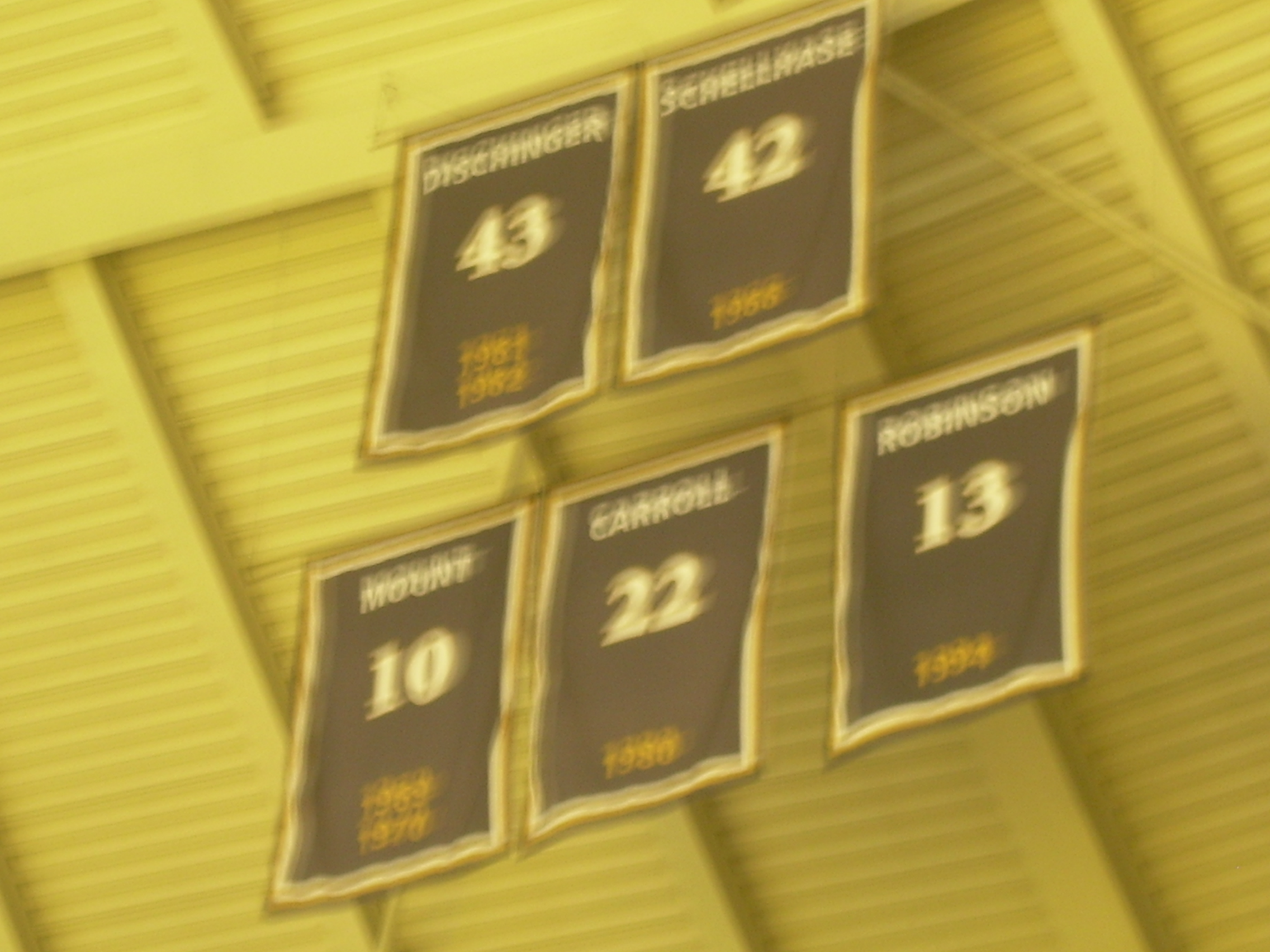
Terry Dischinger, Dave Schellhase, Rick Mount, Joe Barry Carroll, and Glenn Robinson (On November 29, 2011, Mackey displayed three additional banners for Troy Lewis, E'Twaun Moore, and JaJuan Johnson)

==== Consensus All-American Selections (25) ====
- Charles "Stretch" Murphy (1929, 1930)
- John Wooden (1930, 1931, 1932)
- Norman Cottom (1934)
- Robert Kessler (1936)
- Jewell Young (1937, 1938)
- Terry Dischinger (1961, 1962)
- Dave Schellhase (1966)
- Rick Mount (1969, 1970)
- Joe Barry Carroll (1980)
- Glenn Robinson (1994)
- JaJuan Johnson (2011)
- Caleb Swanigan (2017)
- Carsen Edwards (2018, 2019)
- Jaden Ivey (2022)
- Zach Edey (2023, 2024)
- Braden Smith (2025, 2026)

==== Second Team All-Americans (8) ====
- Terry Dischinger (1960)
- Dave Schellhase (1965)
- Rick Mount (1968)
- Glenn Robinson (1993)
- Robbie Hummel (2010*)
- Carsen Edwards (2018^, 2019#)
- Jaden Ivey (2022#)

State Farm* USA Today^ NABC#

==== Third Team All-Americans (9) ====
- Carl McNulty (1951)
- Rick Mount (1968)
- Joe Barry Carroll (1979)
- Robbie Hummel (2010*)
- E'Twaun Moore (2010**, 2011)
- Carsen Edwards (2018^, 2019^)
- Trey Kaufman-Renn (2025^^)

Fox Sports* Yahoo.com** The Sporting News^ CBS^^

==== Honorable Mention All-Americans (9) ====
- Keith Edmonson (1982)
- Steve Scheffler (1990)
- Cuonzo Martin (1995)
- Robbie Hummel (2010, 2012)
- E'Twaun Moore (2010)
- A. J. Hammons (2016)
- Zach Edey (2022)
- Braden Smith (2024)

==== Helms All-Americans (27) ====
- Dave Charters (1910, 1911)
- Lawrence Teeple (1913)
- Elmer Oliphant (1914)
- Donald White (1921)
- Ray Miller (1922)
- George Spradling (1926)
- Charles Murphy (1928, 1929, 1930)
- John Wooden (1930, 1931, 1932)
- Norman Cottom (1934)
- Emmett Lowery (1934)
- Robert Kessler (1936)
- Jewell Young (1937, 1938)
- Fred Beretta (1940)
- Paul Hoffman (1945, 1946, 1947)
- Carl McNulty (1951)
- Willie Merriweather (1959)
- Terry Dischinger (1961, 1962)
- Dave Schellhase (1966)

==== Academic All-American selections (11) ====
- Dave Schellhase (1966)
- Bob Ford (1972)
- Brian Walker (1981)
- Keith Edmonson (1982)
- Steve Reid (1983, 1984)
- Craig Riley (1992)
- Carson Cunningham (2000, 2001)
- E'Twaun Moore (2010*)
- Caleb Swanigan (2017*)

Second Team*

=== Big Ten Conference awards ===
==== Big Ten Player of the Year (7) ====
- Steve Scheffler (1990)
- Glenn Robinson (1994)
- JaJuan Johnson (2011)
- Caleb Swanigan (2017)
- Zach Edey (2023, 2024)
- Braden Smith (2025)

==== Chicago Tribune Silver Basketball Recipient (4) ====
- Rick Mount (1969, 1970)
- Jim Rowinski (1984)
- Glenn Robinson (1994)

==== Big Ten Coach of the Year (12) ====
- Gene Keady (1984, 1988, 1990, 1994, 1995, 1996, 2000)
- Matt Painter (2008, 2010, 2011, 2019, 2024)

==== Howard Moore Big Ten Assistant Coach of the Year (1) ====
- Brandon Brantley (2024)

==== First Team All-Big Ten (100) ====
- Cliff Lewis (1908)
- Dave Charters (1910, 1911)
- Ed McVaugh (1912)
- Karp Stockton (1912)
- Elmer Oliphant (1913, 1914)
- Larry Teeple (1913)
- Henry Brockenbrough (1916)
- Paul Church (1918)
- Don Tilson (1920)
- Donald White (1920, 1921)
- Ray Miller (1921, 1922)
- Blair Gullion (1922)
- George Spradling (1926)
- Wilbur Cummins (1927)
- Harold Kemmer (1928)
- Charles Murphy (1928, 1929, 1930)
- John Wooden (1930, 1931, 1932)
- Harry Kellar (1932)
- Ralph Parmenter (1933)
- Norm Cottom (1934)
- Emmett Lowery (1934)
- Robert Kessler (1935, 1936)
- Jewell Young (1937, 1938)
- Gene Anderson (1938)
- Fred Beretta (1940)
- Don Blanken (1942)
- Forrest Sprowl (1942)
- Paul Hoffman (1944, 1945, 1946, 1947)
- Howie Williams (1949, 1950)
- Carl McNulty (1952)
- Willie Merriweather (1959)
- Terry Dischinger (1960, 1961, 1962)
- Mel Garland (1963)
- Dave Schellhase (1964, 1965, 1966)
- Rick Mount (1968, 1969, 1970)
- Herm Gilliam (1969)
- Bob Ford (1972)
- Frank Kendrick (1974)
- John Garrett (1975)
- Bruce Parkinson (1975)
- Walter Jordan (1977, 1978)
- Joe Barry Carroll (1979, 1980)
- Keith Edmonson (1982)
- Russell Cross (1983)
- Jim Rowinski (1984)
- James Bullock (1985)
- Troy Lewis (1987, 1988)
- Todd Mitchell (1988)
- Steve Scheffler (1990)
- Jimmy Oliver (1991)
- Woody Austin (1992)
- Glenn Robinson (1993, 1994)
- Cuonzo Martin (1995)
- Chad Austin (1997, 1998)
- Willie Deane (2003)
- Carl Landry (2007)
- Robbie Hummel (2008, 2010, 2012)
- JaJuan Johnson (2009, 2011)
- E'Twaun Moore (2010, 2011)
- A. J. Hammons (2016)
- Caleb Swanigan (2017)
- Carsen Edwards (2018, 2019)
- Trevion Williams (2021)
- Jaden Ivey (2022)
- Zach Edey (2023, 2024)
- Braden Smith (2024, 2025, 2026)
- Trey Kaufman-Renn (2025)

==== Defensive Player of the Year (9) ====
- Ricky Hall (1984)
- Porter Roberts (1996)
- Kenneth Lowe (2003, 2004)
- Chris Kramer (2008, 2010)
- JaJuan Johnson (2011)
- Rapheal Davis (2015)
- A. J. Hammons (2016)

==== All-Freshman Team (11) ====
- Chris Lutz (2007)
- Robbie Hummel (2008)
- E'Twaun Moore (2008)
- Lewis Jackson (2009)
- Kelsey Barlow (2010)
- A. J. Hammons (2013)
- Kendall Stephens (2014)
- Caleb Swanigan (2016)
- Zach Edey (2021)
- Jaden Ivey (2021)
- Braden Smith (2023)

==== All-Defensive Team (21) ====
- Kenneth Lowe (2003, 2004)
- Chris Kramer (2007, 2008, 2009, 2010)
- JaJuan Johnson (2009, 2010, 2011)
- A. J. Hammons (2013, 2014, 2015, 2016)
- Rapheal Davis (2015, 2016)
- Dakota Mathias (2017, 2018)
- Nojel Eastern (2019)
- Eric Hunter Jr. (2022)
- Zach Edey (2023, 2024)

==== Sixth Man of the Year (3) ====
- D. J. Byrd (2012)
- Trevion Williams (2022)
- Mason Gillis (2024)

All data taken from

==== Academic All-Big Ten (72) ====
- Dave Schellhase (1964, 1965, 1966)
- Mel Garland (1964)
- George Faerber (1970, 1971)
- Bob Ford (1972)
- Dick Satterfield (1975)
- Bruce Parkinson (1977)
- Brian Walker (1979, 1980)
- Keith Edmonson (1982)
- Steve Reid (1983, 1984, 1985)
- Curt Clawson (1983, 1984)
- Doug Lee (1984)
- Jim Rowinski (1984)
- Troy Lewis (1986)
- Dave Barrett (1989, 1990, 1991)
- John Brugos (1989)
- Craig Riley (1990, 1991, 1992)
- Todd Schoettelkotte (1991)
- Tim Ervin (1994, 1995)
- Herb Dove (1996)
- Chad Kerkhof (1997, 1998, 1999, 2000)
- Carson Cunningham (1999, 2000, 2001)
- Andrew Ford (2002, 2003, 2004, 2005)
- Matt Carroll (2003, 2004, 2005, 2006)
- Chris Hartley (2004, 2005, 2006, 2007)
- Matt Kiefer (2004, 2005, 2006)
- Austin Parkinson (2004)
- Brett Buscher (2004)
- Gary Ware (2005)
- Charles Davis (2005)
- Bobby Riddell (2007, 2008, 2009)
- Tarrence Crump (2008)
- Chris Kramer (2008, 2009, 2010)
- E'Twaun Moore (2009, 2010)
- Robbie Hummel (2009, 2010, 2012)
- Mark Wohlford (2010)
- Keaton Grant (2010)
- Ryne Smith (2010)

==== Conference Scoring champions (29) ====
- Dave Charters (1910)
- Henry Brockenbrough (1916)
- Donald White (1921)
- George Sprading (1924)
- Wilbur Cummins (1927)
- Charles "Stretch" Murphy (1929)
- John Wooden (1932)
- Norm Cottom (1934)
- Robert Kessler (1936)
- Jewell Young (1937, 1938)
- Terry Dischinger (1960, 1961, 1962)
- Dave Schellhase (1965)
- Rick Mount (1968, 1969, 1970)
- Joe Barry Carroll (1979)
- Keith Edmonson (1982)
- Glenn Robinson (1993, 1994)
- Willie Deane (2002)
- Carl Landry (2005)
- JaJuan Johnson (2011)
- Caleb Swanigan (2017)
- Carsen Edwards (2019)
- Zach Edey (2023, 2024)

== Records ==
=== Record vs. Big Ten opponents ===
Up until the addition of Washington, Oregon, UCLA, and USC to the Big Ten for the 2024–2025 season, the Purdue Boilermakers lead the all-time series with every Big Ten opponent. Purdue had a losing record against UCLA and USC, and the series with Oregon was tied at 2-2. (While Ohio State has vacated games from 1999 to 2002, Purdue still recognizes those games and keeps records accordingly.)

| Opponent | Wins | Losses | Pct. | Streak |
|---|---|---|---|---|
| Illinois | 107 | 91 | .540 | Illinois 1 |
| Indiana | 128 | 93 | .579 | Purdue 1 |
| Iowa | 98 | 78 | .557 | Purdue 4 |
| Maryland | 10 | 6 | .625 | Purdue 2 |
| Michigan | 94 | 77 | .550 | Michigan 2 |
| Michigan State | 77 | 57 | .575 | Michigan St 1 |
| Minnesota | 111 | 84 | .569 | Purdue 5 |
| Nebraska | 21 | 7 | .750 | Purdue 1 |
| Northwestern | 136 | 48 | .739 | Purdue 2 |
| Ohio State | 94 | 94 | .500 | Ohio State 2 |
| Oregon | 3 | 2 | .600 | Purdue 1 |
| Penn State | 47 | 14 | .770 | Penn St 1 |
| Rutgers | 18 | 6 | .750 | Purdue 5 |
| UCLA | 4 | 10 | .286 | Purdue 1 |
| USC | 5 | 4 | .556 | Purdue 3 |
| Washington | 6 | 1 | .857 | Purdue 4 |
| Wisconsin | 114 | 75 | .600 | Wisconsin 2 |

As of the end of the 2024–25 season.

=== Individual career records ===
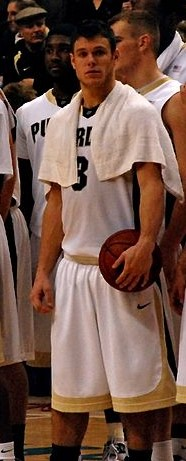
Chris Kramer

- Points scored: Zach Edey (2,516)
- Points per game: Rick Mount (32.3)
- Assists: Braden Smith (1103)
- Assists per game: Braden Smith (7.4)
- Rebounds: Zach Edey (1,321)
- Rebounds per game: Terry Dischinger (13.7)
- Blocks: Joe Barry Carroll (349)
- Blocks per game: Joe Barry Carroll (2.8)
- Steals: Chris Kramer (274)
- Steals per game: Chris Kramer (2.1)
- Starts: Braden Smith, Fletcher Loyer (149)
- Field goal percentage: Steve Scheffler (.685)
- Free throw percentage: Jerry Sichting (.867)
- Free throws: Terry Dischinger (713)
- Three point field goals: Fletcher Loyer (309)
- Three point percentage: Cuonzo Martin (.451)
- Games played: Braden Smith, Fletcher Loyer (149)
- Games won: Braden Smith, Fletcher Loyer (117)
- Double-doubles: Zach Edey (69)
- 20-20s: Caleb Swanigan (4)
- Triple-doubles: Joe Barry Carroll (1, 1977)
- Minutes played: Braden Smith (5,065)
- Consecutive free throws made: Robbie Hummel (36)

=== Individual single-season records ===
- Points scored: Glenn Robinson (1,030, 1994)
- Points per game: Rick Mount (35.4, 1970)
- Assists: Braden Smith (345, 2026)
- Assists per game: Braden Smith (8.8, 2025)
- Assist/turnover ratio: PJ Thompson (4.04, 2016)
- Rebounds: Zach Edey (474, 2024)
- Rebounds per game: Terry Dischinger (14.3, 1960)
- Blocks: Joe Barry Carroll (105, 1978)
- Blocks per game: Joe Barry Carroll (3.9, 1978)
- Steals: Brian Walker (88, 1979)
- Field goal percentage: Steve Scheffler (.708, 1988)
- Free throw percentage: Henry Ebershoff (.907, 1966)
- Free throws: Zach Edey (310, 2024)
- Three point percentage: Jaraan Cornell (.500, 1998)
- Three point field goals: Carsen Edwards (135, 2019)
- Double-doubles: Zach Edey (30, 2024)
- Minutes played: Braden Smith (1,344, 2026)
- Games played: Zach Edey, Braden Smith, Lance Jones, Fletcher Loyer, Mason Gillis, Trey Kaufman-Renn, Camden Heide (39, 2024); Braden Smith, Fletcher Loyer, C.J. Cox, Oscar Cluff, Omer Mayer, Daniel Jacobsen, Gicarri Harris (39, 2026)

=== Individual single-game records ===
- Points scored: Rick Mount (61, 1970, no three-point line)
- Assists: Bruce Parkinson (18, 1975)
- Rebounds: Carl McNulty (27, 1951)
- Blocks: Joe Barry Carroll (11, 1977)
- Steals: Ricky Hall (8, 1983)
- Three point field goals: Carsen Edwards (10, 2019)
- Three point field goals (At home): Mason Gillis (9, 2023)
- Three point field goal attempts: Carsen Edwards (19, 2019)
- Free throws: Terry Dischinger (21, 1961)
- Minutes played: Don Beck, Dennis Blind, Joe Sexson, Dan Thornburg (70, 1955)

=== Freshman season records ===
- Points: Russell Cross (540, 1981)
- Points in a game: Kyle Macy (38, 1976)
- Points per game: Russell Cross (16.9, 1981)
- Field goal percentage: Ian Stanback (.670, 1991)
- Rebounds: Caleb Swanigan (282, 2016)
- Rebounds per game: Caleb Swanigan (8.3, 2016)
- Rebounds in a game: Wayne Walls (18, 1975)
- Three point field goals: E'Twaun Moore (66, 2008)
- Three point field goals in a game: Luke Ertel (8, 2026)
- Three point percentage: Robbie Hummel (44.7, 2008)
- Blocks: Joe Barry Carroll (82, 1977)
- Steals: Chris Kramer (64, 2007)
- Steals in a game: Braden Smith (7, 2022)
- Assists: Braden Smith (153, 2023)
- Free throw percentage: Braden Smith (86.8, 2023)
- Games played: Lewis Jackson (36, 2009)
- Games started: Braden Smith & Fletcher Loyer (35, 2023)
- Double-Doubles: Caleb Swanigan (8, 2016)

=== 1,000+ point scorers (58) ===
1. Zach Edey (2,516)
2. Rick Mount (2,323)
3. Joe Barry Carroll (2,175)
4. E'Twaun Moore (2,136)
5. Dave Schellhase (2,074)
6. Troy Lewis (2,038)
7. Terry Dischinger (1,979)
8. Braden Smith (1,932)
9. Carsen Edwards (1,920)
10. JaJuan Johnson (1,919)
11. Fletcher Loyer (1,829)
12. Walter Jordan (1,813)
13. Robbie Hummel (1,772)
14. Keith Edmonson (1,717)
15. Glenn Robinson (1,706)
16. Todd Mitchell (1,699)
17. Chad Austin (1,694)
18. Cuonzo Martin (1,666)
19. Trey Kaufman-Renn (1,655)
20. Vincent Edwards (1,638)
21. John Garrett (1,620)
22. Jaraan Cornell (1,595)
23. A. J. Hammons (1,593)
24. Brian Cardinal (1,584)
25. Isaac Haas (1,555)
26. Mel McCants (1,554)
27. Brad Miller (1,530)
28. Russell Cross (1,529)
29. Eugene Parker (1,430)
30. Trevion Williams (1,410)
31. David Teague (1,378)
32. Willie Deane (1,328)
33. Mike Robinson (1,322)
34. Terone Johnson (1,308)
35. Frank Kendrick (1,269)
36. Drake Morris (1,250)
37. Bob Ford (1,244)
38. Mel Garland (1,243)
39. Bruce Parkinson (1,224)
40. Carl Landry (1,175)
41. Matt Waddell (1,170)
42. Jerry Sichting (1,161)
43. Steve Scheffler (1,155)
44. Dakota Mathias (1,140)
45. Herm Gilliam (1,118)
46. Larry Weatherford (1,103)
47. Joe Sexson (1,095)
48. Steve Reid (1,084)
49. Kenneth Lowe (1,079)
50. Woody Austin (1,076)
51. Bob Purkhiser (1,060)
52. Billy Keller (1,056)
53. Everette Stephens (1,044)
54. Tony Jones (1,041)
55. Keaton Grant (1,031)
56. Wayne Walls (1,030)
57. Dennis Blind (1,011)
58. Rapheal Davis (1,009)

All data taken from

== Boilermakers in the NBA, ABA, NBL, NBA G League (65) ==
- Fletcher Loyer (2026–present) San Diego Clippers
- Braden Smith (2026–present) Indiana Pacers, Noblesville Boom
- Zach Edey (2024–present) Memphis Grizzlies
- Nojel Eastern (2023–present) Iowa Wolves
- Jaden Ivey (2022–2026) Detroit Pistons, Chicago Bulls
- Trevion Williams (2022–2023) Santa Cruz Warriors, Capital City Go-Go
- Aaron Wheeler (2022–2023) Greensboro Swarm, Windy City Bulls
- Dakota Mathias (2019–2026) Texas Legends, Philadelphia 76ers, Memphis Grizzlies, Memphis Hustle, Noblesville Boom
- Carsen Edwards (2019–2021) Boston Celtics, Maine Red Claws, Memphis Grizzlies, Salt Lake City Stars, Detroit Pistons
- Vincent Edwards (2018–2021) Houston Rockets, Canton Charge, Sacramento Kings, Oklahoma City Blue, Iowa Wolves
- Isaac Haas (2018–2020) Salt Lake City Stars
- Caleb Swanigan (2017–2020) Portland Trail Blazers, Canton Charge, Texas Legends, Sacramento Kings, Stockton Kings
- AJ Hammons (2016–2018) Dallas Mavericks, Texas Legends, Sioux Falls Skyforce
- Robbie Hummel (2012–2015) Minnesota Timberwolves, Denver Nuggets
- JaJuan Johnson (2011–2012) Boston Celtics, Houston Rockets
- E'Twaun Moore (2011–2021) Boston Celtics, Houston Rockets, Orlando Magic, Chicago Bulls, New Orleans Pelicans, Phoenix Suns, Orlando Magic
- Carl Landry (2007–2016) Houston Rockets, Sacramento Kings, New Orleans Hornets, Golden State Warriors, Sacramento Kings, Philadelphia 76ers
- Brian Cardinal (2000–2012) Detroit Pistons, Washington Wizards, Golden State Warriors, Memphis Grizzlies, Minnesota Timberwolves, New York Knicks, Dallas Mavericks
- Brad Miller (1998–2012) Charlotte Hornets, Indiana Pacers, Sacramento Kings, Chicago Bulls, Houston Rockets, Minnesota Timberwolves
- Willie Deane (2003) Washington Wizards
- Cuonzo Martin (1995–1997) Atlanta Hawks, Vancouver Grizzlies
- Glenn Robinson (1994–2005) Milwaukee Bucks, Atlanta Hawks, Philadelphia 76ers, San Antonio Spurs
- Jimmy Oliver (1991–1996) Cleveland Cavaliers, Boston Celtics
- Steve Scheffler (1990–1997) Charlotte Hornets, Sacramento Kings, Denver Nuggets, Seattle SuperSonics
- Everette Stephens (1988–1989, 1990–1991) Indiana Pacers, Milwaukee Bucks
- Todd Mitchell (1988–1989) San Antonio Spurs, Miami Heat
- Doug Lee (1991–1993, 1994–1995) New Jersey Nets, Sacramento Kings
- Tom Scheffler (1985–1986) Portland Trail Blazers
- Jim Rowinski (1984–1990) Utah Jazz, Detroit Pistons, Philadelphia 76ers, Miami Heat
- Russell Cross (1983–1984) Golden State Warriors
- Mike Scearce (1982) Indiana Pacers
- Keith Edmonson (1982–1984) Atlanta Hawks, Denver Nuggets, San Antonio Spurs
- Brian Walker (1981) Kansas City Kings
- Walter Jordan (1980–1981) Cleveland Cavaliers
- Arnette Hallman (1980) Boston Celtics
- Joe Barry Carroll (1980–1991) Golden State Warriors, Houston Rockets, New Jersey Nets, Denver Nuggets, Phoenix Suns
- Jerry Sichting (1980–1990) Indiana Pacers, Boston Celtics, Portland Trail Blazers, Milwaukee Bucks
- Kyle Macy (1980–1987) Phoenix Suns, Chicago Bulls, Indiana Pacers
- Eugene Parker (1978) San Antonio Spurs
- Bruce Parkinson (1976) Cleveland Cavaliers, Washington Bullets
- John Garrett (1975) Washington Bullets
- Frank Kendrick (1974–1975) Golden State Warriors
- William Franklin* (1972–1973, 1974–1976) Golden State Warriors, Virginia Squires, San Antonio Spurs
- Bob Ford* (1972–1973) Memphis Tams
- Larry Weatherford (1971) Chicago Bulls
- Rick Mount* (1970–1975) Indiana Pacers, Kentucky Colonels, Utah Stars, Memphis Sounds
- Herm Gilliam (1969–1977) Atlanta Hawks, Seattle SuperSonics, Portland Trail Blazers
- Billy Keller* (1969–1976) Indiana Pacers
- Dave Schellhase (1966–1968) Chicago Bulls
- George Grams (1966) Los Angeles Lakers
- Terry Dischinger (1962–1965, 1967–1973) Chicago Zephyrs, Detroit Pistons, Portland Trail Blazers
- Wilson Eison (1959–1960) Minneapolis Lakers
- Willie Merriweather (1959) St. Louis Hawks
- Joe Sexson (1956) New York Knicks
- Pete Brewster (1952) Milwaukee Hawks
- Carl McNulty (1952) Milwaukee Hawks
- Andy Butchko (1950) Minneapolis Lakers
- Howie Williams (1950) Minneapolis Lakers
- Paul Hoffman (1947–1948, 1949–1951, 1952–1955) Toronto Huskies, New York Knicks, Baltimore Bullets, Philadelphia Warriors
- Ed Ehlers (1947–1949) Boston Celtics
- Forest Weber** (1945–1947) Indianapolis Kautskys
- Jewell Young** (1938–1942, 1946) Indianapolis Kautskys
- Robert Kessler** (1937–1940) Indianapolis Kautskys
- Glynn Downey** (1938–1939) Indianapolis Kautskys **(1939–1940) Hammond Ciesar All-Americans
- John Wooden** (1932–1937) Indianapolis Kautskys, **(1937–1938) Hammond Ciesar All-Americans, Indianapolis Kautskys (1938–1942)
- Stretch Murphy** (1930–1934) Chicago Bruins, Indianapolis Kautskys

played in the ABA* NBL**

=== NBA All-Star selections (8) ===
- Terry Dischinger (1963, 1964, 1965)
- Joe Barry Carroll (1987)
- Glenn Robinson (2000, 2001)
- Brad Miller (2003, 2004)

=== First round draft picks (12) ===
Purdue is one of just fourteen schools in the nation that has produced more than one "No. 1 Overall" NBA Draft pick.

- Ed "Bulbs" Ehlers (3rd, 1947)
- Dave Schellhase (10th, 1966)
- Herm Gilliam (8th, 1969)
- Kyle Macy * (22nd, 1979)
- Joe Barry Carroll (1st, 1980)
- Keith Edmonson(10th, 1982)
- Russell Cross (6th, 1983)
- Glenn Robinson (1st, 1994)
- JaJuan Johnson (27th, 2011)
- Caleb Swanigan (26th, 2017)
- Jaden Ivey (5th, 2022)
- Zach Edey (9th, 2024)

transferred after freshman season*

=== Second round draft picks (17) ===
- Terry Dischinger (1st, 1962)
- Arnette Hallman (23rd, 1980)
- Doug Lee (12th, 1987)
- Everette Stephens (6th, 1988)
- Todd Mitchell (18th, 1988)
- Steve Scheffler (12th, 1990)
- Jimmy Oliver (12th, 1991)
- Cuonzo Martin (28th, 1995)
- Brian Cardinal (15th, 2000)
- Carl Landry (1st, 2007)
- E'Twaun Moore (25th, 2011)
- Robbie Hummel (28th, 2012)
- AJ Hammons (16th, 2016)
- Vince Edwards (22nd, 2018)
- Carsen Edwards (3rd, 2019)
- Braden Smith (8th, 2026)
- Trey Kaufman-Renn * (29th, 2026)

returned to NCAA as transfer after draft*

=== NBA Rookie of the Year (2) ===
- Paul Hoffman, Baltimore Bullets* (1948)
- Terry Dischinger, Chicago Zephyrs (1963)

=== NBL Rookie of the Year (2) ===
- Robert Kessler** Indianapolis Kautskys (1938)
- Jewell Young** Indianapolis Kautskys (1939)

=== NBA All-Rookie Team (4) ===
- Terry Dischinger (1963)
- Joe Barry Carroll (1981)
- Glenn Robinson (1995)
- Zach Edey (2025)

=== NBA All-Rookie Second Team ===
- Carl Landry (2008)
- Jaden Ivey (2023)

=== NBA, ABA, BAA Champions (8) ===
==== BAA ====
- Paul Hoffman (1948) Baltimore Bullets

==== ABA ====
- Billy Keller (1970, 1972, 1973) Indiana Pacers
- Rick Mount (1972) Indiana Pacers

==== NBA ====
- Frank Kendrick (1975) Golden State Warriors
- Herm Gilliam (1977) Portland Trail Blazers
- Jerry Sichting (1986) Boston Celtics
- Glenn Robinson, (2005) San Antonio Spurs
- Brian Cardinal, (2011) Dallas Mavericks

=== Head coaches (5) ===
- Doxie Moore (1946–1947) Sheboygan Red Skins (1950) Anderson Packers (1951–1952) Milwaukee Hawks
- Fred Schaus (1960–1967) Los Angeles Lakers
- Terry Dischinger (1971) Detroit Pistons
- Frank Kendrick (1999–2000) Gary Steelheads*

CBA *

=== Assistant coaches (4) ===
- Lee Rose (1986–1988) San Antonio Spurs (1988–1989) New Jersey Nets (1991–1992) Milwaukee Bucks (1996–2001) Charlotte Hornets
- Jerry Sichting (1995–2005, 2008–2010) Minnesota Timberwolves, (2010–2011) Golden State Warriors, (2012–2013) Washington Wizards, (2013–2016) Phoenix Suns, (2016–2018) New York Knicks
- Gene Keady (2005–2006) Toronto Raptors
- Micah Shrewsberry (2013–2019) Boston Celtics

=== Executives (2) ===
- Paul Hoffman (1963–1965), General Manager Baltimore Bullets
- Fred Schaus (1967–1972) General Manager Los Angeles Lakers

== Boilermakers in international basketball ==
- Oscar Cluff, in Basketbol Süper Ligi
- Carsen Edwards, in Lietuvos krepšinio lyga
- Vince Edwards, in the Liga Mexicana de Básquetbol CIBACOPA
- Mason Gillis*, in the Korisliiga
- Matt Haarms*, in the B.League
- JaJuan Johnson, in the Kosovo Basketball Superleague
- Dakota Mathias, in the National Basketball League
- Brandon Newman*, in the Slovak Basketball League
- Kendall Stephens*, in Novo Basquete Brasil
- Aaron Wheeler,* in the Israeli Basketball Premier League
- Trevion Williams, in Basketbol Süper Ligi

transferred from Purdue*

== Boilermakers on National Basketball rosters ==
All represented the United States unless otherwise noted

=== Olympic Games ===
- Glenn Robinson (1996)^
- Terry Dischinger (1960)
- Howard Williams (1952)

^ – replaced due to injury

=== FIBA Basketball World Cup ===
- Zach Edey (2023, Canada)
- Brad Miller (2006, 1998)
- Jimmy Oliver (1998)
- Eugene Parker (1978)

=== FIBA 3x3 World Cup ===
- Robbie Hummel (2019)

=== Pan-Am Games ===
Traditional

- Chuckie White (1995)
- Bruce Parkinson (1975)
- Bob Ford (1971)

3x3 Tournament

- Jonathan Octeus (2019)

=== FIBA EuroBasket ===
- Matt Haarms (2022, Netherlands)

=== FIBA U21 World Championship ===
- Chad Austin (1997)
- Brian Cardinal (1997)
- Brad Miller (1997)

=== FIBA U20 EuroBasket ===
- Omer Mayer (2025, Israel)

=== FIBA U19 Basketball World Cup ===
- Daniel Jacobsen (2025)
- Omer Mayer (2025, Israel)
- Sinan Huan (2025, China)
- Myles Colvin (2023)
- Caleb Furst (2021)
- Jaden Ivey (2021)
- Zach Edey (2021, Canada)
- Trevion Williams (2019)
- Carsen Edwards (2017)
- Caleb Swanigan (2015)

=== FIBA U18 AmeriCup ===
- Daniel Jacobsen (2024)

=== FIBA U18 Asia Cup ===
- Sinan Huan (2024, China)

=== FIBA 3x3 U18 World Cup ===
- Myles Colvin (2022)
- Ethan Morton (2019)

=== FIBA U18 EuroBasket ===
- Omer Mayer (2023, 2024, Israel)
- Matt Haarms (2015, Netherlands)

=== FIBA U17 Basketball World Cup ===
- Sinan Huan (2024, China)
- Caleb Swanigan (2014)

=== World University Games ===
- 2017–18 Roster (2017)^
- Robbie Hummel (2009)
- Tony Jones (1989)
- Steven Scheffler (1989)
- Troy Lewis (1987)
- Walter Jordan (1977)
- Bob Ford (1970)

^ - During the 2017 World University Games, Purdue was selected to represent Team USA.

=== Goodwill Games ===
- Brian Cardinal (1998)

=== William Jones Cup ===
- Troy Lewis (1985)
- Todd Mitchell (1985)

=== FIBA Intercontinental Cup ===
- Bruce Parkinson (1975)

=== Spartakiad ===
- Joe Barry Carroll (1979)
- Brian Walker (1979)

=== World Invitational tournament ===
- Joe Barry Carroll (1978)

== Early-season tournament championships ==
- Paradise Jam tournament (2009)
- Hall of Fame Tip Off Naismith Bracket (2015)
- Cancún Challenge Riviera Division (2016)
- Hall of Fame Tip Off (2021)
- Phil Knight Legacy Tournament (2022)
- Maui Invitational (2023)
- Rady Children's Invitational (2024)
- Bahamas Championship (2025)

== Radio network affiliates ==
| City | Call Sign | Frequency |
|---|---|---|
| Bedford, Indiana | WBIW | 1340 AM |
| Berne, Indiana | WZBD-FM | 92.7 FM |
| Boonville, Indiana | WBNL | 1540 AM |
| Columbus, Indiana | WYGB-FM | 100.3 FM |
| Crawfordsville, Indiana | WCDQ-FM | 106.3 FM |
| Evansville, Indiana | WGBF | 1280 AM |
| Fort Wayne, Indiana | WKJG | 1380 AM |
| Greencastle, Indiana | WREB-FM | 94.3 FM |
| Hammond, Indiana | WJOB | 1230 AM |
| Huntingburg, Indiana | WBDC | 100.9 FM |
| Indianapolis, Indiana | WNDE | 1260 AM/97.5 FM |
| Kokomo, Indiana | WIOU | 1350 AM |
| Lafayette, Indiana | WAZY | 96.5 FM |
| Marion, Indiana | WMRI | 860 AM |
| Michigan City, Indiana | WEFM-FM | 95.9 FM |
| Mount Vernon, Indiana | WRCY | 1590 AM |
| Peru, Indiana | WARU-FM | 101.9 FM |
| Salem, Indiana | WSLM/WSLM-FM | 1220 AM / 97.9 FM |
| South Bend, Indiana | WHME-FM | 103.1 FM |
| Terre Haute, Indiana | WAMB | 99.5 FM |
| Vincennes, Indiana | WFML-FM | 96.7 FM |
| Warsaw, Indiana | WRSW | 1480 AM |
| Winchester, Indiana | WZZY-FM | 98.3 FM |
