= Ray Eddy =

American college basketball coach

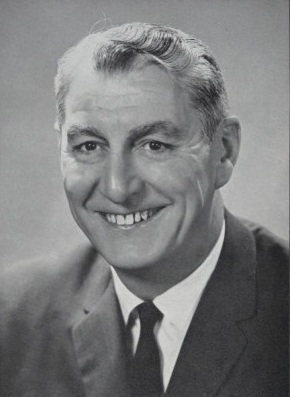

Personal information
- Born: April 13, 1911 Columbus, Indiana, U.S.
- Died: September 20, 1986 (aged 75) Lafayette, Indiana, U.S.
- Listed height: 6 ft 0 in (1.83 m)
- Listed weight: 180 lb (82 kg)

Career information
- High school: Columbus (Columbus, Indiana)
- College: Purdue (1932–1934)
- Position: Forward
- Number: 12

Career history

Coaching
- 1934–1939: Tell City Marksmen
- 1939–1950: Madison Cubs
- 1950–1965: Purdue

Career highlights
- As player: Helms National Title (1932); As coach: IHSAA State Title (1950)

John Ray Eddy (April 13, 1911 – September 20, 1986) was an American college basketball coach and former player. He was the head men's basketball coach at Purdue University from 1950 to 1965. He grew up in Columbus, Indiana, where he starred on the Columbus High School basketball team. After high school, he attended Purdue University, where he played basketball under head coach Ward Lambert. As a 3-year starter, he won two undisputed Big Ten crowns, averaging 6.1 points per game over his career. In 1932 was the second leading scorer on the Helms National Collegiate championship team. In 1934, he was the captain and an All-Big Ten forward for the conference championship team.

When he accepted the Purdue University head coaching position, Eddy became the last head coach to jump directly from the high school ranks to the Big Ten.

== Coaching career ==
=== High school ===
Following his graduation, Eddy was hired as the head coach in Tell City, Indiana. Eddy spent 5 seasons leading the Marksmen, winning 3 Indiana High School Sectional titles. In 1939, Eddy moved to Madison, Indiana and became the head coach for the Madison Cubs. In his 11-year tenure at Madison, Eddy's teams totaled a record of 259–62 (.807), won 10 Sectionals, 6 Regionals, 3 Semi-States & 1 State Championship (1950), his 1941 and 1949 teams finished as the State Runner-Up.

In sixteen seasons at the high school level, Eddy's teams won 13 Sectionals, 6 Regionals, 3 Semi-States & 1 State Championship. In addition, he coached 7 Indiana All-Stars; 9 of his players were later inducted into the Indiana Basketball Hall of Fame.

Eddy led three of his Madison Cubs teams (1940–41, 1948–49 and 1949–50) to the IHSAA State Finals. The third time proved the charm as the Cubs won the highly coveted title in 1949–50; the first two trips, the Cubs were the State Runner-Up.

=== Purdue University ===
Eddy placed a great deal of emphasis on the academic success of his players. During his 15 years at Purdue, he was able to attract a number of talented players, including All-Americans Terry Dischinger and Dave Schellhase. While finishing as Big Ten runner-up on three occasions, Purdue failed to win the title during Eddy's tenure, and never advanced to postseason play.

Eddy's 176 wins rank fourth all-time at Purdue, as do his 15 years on the bench. In addition, Eddy ranks 4th all-time in Big Ten wins among Purdue coaches with 92. His 92 Big Ten wins currently rank 27th in 100+ years of Big Ten history.

In addition to All-Americans Dischinger and Schellhase, Eddy also coached 2 college football All-Americans: Lamar Lundy, the future NFL great, and Bob Griese, NFL Super Bowl Champion and Hall of Famer. Eddy also coached Pete Brewster, a 2x Pro Bowl TE for the Cleveland Browns, and Joe Campbell, former PGA Tour player and Purdue golf coach.

Several of Eddy's players went into coaching at the collegiate as well as high school level; the most well-known include Schellhase (Indiana State, Moorhead (Minn) State), Joe Sexson (Butler), and Mel Garland (IUPUI).

He retired from coaching after the 1964–65 NCAA Division I basketball season and accepted a position as an associate athletic director at Purdue. He retired from the Purdue Athletic Department following the 1977–78 academic year.

== Head coaching record ==
Record table
| Season | Team | Overall | Conference | Standing | Postseason |
|---|---|---|---|---|---|
Purdue Boilermakers (Big Ten Conference) (1950–1965)
| 1950–51 | Purdue | 8–14 | 4–10 | 8th | |
| 1951–52 | Purdue | 8–14 | 3–11 | 10th | |
| 1952–53 | Purdue | 4–18 | 3–15 | T–9th | |
| 1953–54 | Purdue | 9–13 | 3–11 | T–9th | |
| 1954–55 | Purdue | 12–10 | 5–9 | T–6th | |
| 1955–56 | Purdue | 16–6 | 9–5 | T–3rd | |
| 1956–57 | Purdue | 15–7 | 8–6 | T–5th | |
| 1957–58 | Purdue | 14–8 | 9–5 | T–2nd | |
| 1958–59 | Purdue | 15–7 | 8–6 | T–2nd | |
| 1959–60 | Purdue | 11–12 | 6–8 | T–6th | |
| 1960–61 | Purdue | 16–7 | 10–4 | T–2nd | |
| 1961–62 | Purdue | 17–7 | 9–5 | 3rd | |
| 1962–63 | Purdue | 7–17 | 2–12 | 10th | |
| 1963–64 | Purdue | 12–12 | 8–6 | T–4th | |
| 1964–65 | Purdue | 12–12 | 5–9 | 7th | |
| Purdue: | | 176–164 (.518) | 92–122 (.430) | | |
| Total: | | 176–164 (.518) | | | |
