= Dave Schellhase =

American basketball coach (born 1944)

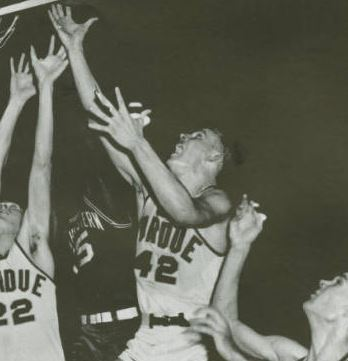
- Schellhase as a sophomore at Purdue

Personal information
- Born: October 14, 1944 (age 82) Evansville, Indiana, U.S.
- Listed height: 6 ft 3 in (1.91 m)
- Listed weight: 205 lb (93 kg)

Career information
- High school: North (Evansville, Indiana)
- College: Purdue (1963–1966)
- NBA draft: 1966: 1st round, 10th overall pick
- Drafted by: Chicago Bulls
- Playing career: 1966–1968
- Position: Point guard
- Number: 8
- Coaching career: 1970–2002

Career history

Playing
- 1966–1968: Chicago Bulls

Coaching
- 1970–1972: Purdue (assistant)
- 1975–1982: Moorhead State
- 1982–1985: Indiana State
- 1987–1999: Moorhead State
- 2001–2002: Cannelton HS

Career highlights
- Consensus first-team All-American (1966); Consensus second-team All-American (1965); NCAA scoring champion (1966)

Career NBA statistics
- Points: 208 (2.8 ppg)
- Rebounds: 76 (1.0 rpg)
- Assists: 60 (0.8 apg)
- Stats at NBA.com
- Stats at Basketball Reference

David Gene Schellhase Jr. (/ˈʃɛlhaʊs/ SHEL-howss; born October 14, 1944) is an American retired college basketball coach and former basketball player in the National Basketball Association (NBA). After a much-heralded college career, he became the first draft pick in Chicago Bulls history, only to become known as one of the biggest first-round disappointments in NBA Draft history.

== Early life ==
Born and raised in Evansville, Indiana, Schellhase attended North High School in Evansville. As a freshman, he was a member of North's first winning basketball team (1958–59); he was also a member of the Pups (North Frosh) Freshman Conference (SIAC)-title team; they had an overall record of 19–3. He led the state in scoring during his Senior year averaging 30.5 points a game, with a total of 1,325 points in his high school career. He was a member of the Indiana All-Star Team. He fell short of winning the Indiana Mr. Basketball Award to Larry Humes.

== College career ==
After high school, Dave attended Purdue University, located in West Lafayette, Indiana. A natural small forward, he played basketball under head coach Ray Eddy. In his Senior year, he led the Boilermakers in scoring with 32.5 points a game while being named a Consensus All-American, Academic All-American and received his third straight First Team All-Big Ten selection. He was a 2nd team All-American following his junior season. Dave scored a career high 57 points on February 19, 1966, against Michigan, the second most in school history, only behind Rick Mount's 61. With 2,074 career points he was the first of six Boilermakers to reach the 2,000 point plateau, along with Rick Mount, Joe Barry Carroll, Troy Lewis, E'Twaun Moore, and Zach Edey.

== Professional career ==
Although some scouts considered Schellhase to be a 'tweener -- not athletic enough to play guard and not big enough to play forward at the next level, the Bulls selected him at the 10th pick in the 1966 NBA draft. In college, Schellhase starred on the front line primarily as a small forward. Partly out of need and partly because of his lack of size, however, coach Johnny Kerr decided the guard position would be his best chance for success. Schellhase never could make the adjustment and spent two seasons as one of the last players off the bench, averaging 2.8 points over 73 games.

In 1968, Schellhase and Kerr were reunited with the Phoenix Suns after the first-year franchise selected him in the expansion draft. He did not make the final roster and embarked on a college coaching career a short time later.

== Collegiate coaching career ==
=== Purdue ===
Schellhase served as an assistant coach under head coach George King in his last two seasons (1971–1972) on the bench. In that span, Purdue achieved a 30–19 record and 1971 NIT appearance. Mainly an assistant to the freshman team, he joined fellow former Purdue standout George Faerber under coach Dave Toney.

=== Moorhead State ===
Schellhase was the head coach at Moorhead State University from 1975 to 1982, where he led the Dragons to two NSIC titles and to six NAIA Tourneys and an overall post-season record of 8–5. He was selected twice as the NSIC Coach of the Year in 1981 and 1982. In seven seasons, he left the program with a record of 137–64.

=== Indiana State ===
Schellhase moved on to coach at the Division I level, leading Sycamores for three seasons from 1982 to 1985, where he compiled a record of 37-48 and currently ranks 14th in wins in Sycamore history. He was the third former Boilermaker to coach at Indiana State after John Wooden's successful tenure from 1946 to 1948 and Bill Hodges' stint from 1979 to 1982.

=== Return to Moorhead State ===
After his tenure at ISU at the NCAA Division I level, he returned to Moorhead State in 1987 where he led the Dragons to seven NAIA Tourneys and a post-season record of 1–6. In twelve seasons from 1987 to 1999, he compiled a record of 161–176. One of his star players, Brett Beeson, led the nation in scoring in 1995–96, before embarking on a lengthy career in foreign leagues.

During his 18-year career at Moorhead State, his overall record was 298–240 with 13 trips to the NAIA Tourney. Schellhase was the Dragons Head Coach in 1992 during their transition from NAIA to NCAA Division II.

On October 16, 2015; he was inducted into the Moorhead State 'Dragon Sports Hall of Fame'. He remains the winningest coach at Moorhead State (298-240 .554)

=== Currently ===
Schellhase returned to coaching in Indiana at the high school level; he coached Cannelton High School for the 2001–02 season. Schellhase has been at Logansport High School in Logansport, Indiana since 2004. He's served as the dean of students as well as teaching in the Health, Physical Education Department

== Career playing statistics ==
Legend
GP	Games played	GS	Games started	MPG	Minutes per game
FG%	Field goal percentage	3P%	3-point field goal percentage	FT%	Free throw percentage
RPG	Rebounds per game	APG	Assists per game	SPG	Steals per game
BPG	Blocks per game	PPG	Points per game	**Bold**	Career high

=== NBA ===
==== Regular season ====
Year	Team	GP	MPG	FG%	FT%	RPG	APG	PPG
1966–67	Chicago	31	6.8	**.360**	**.636**	.9	.7	**3.0**
1967–68	Chicago	**42**	**7.2**	.341	.526	**1.1**	**.9**	2.7
Career		73	7.0	.349	.567	1.0	.8	2.8

==== Playoffs ====
Year	Team	GP	MPG	FG%	FT%	RPG	APG	PPG
1967	Chicago	**2**	1.5	.000	**.500**	**.5**	.0	.5
1968	Chicago	1	**5.0**	**.333**	–	.0	.0	**2.0**
Career		3	2.7	.200	.500	.3	.0	1.0

== Head coaching record ==
Record table
Season	Team	Overall	Conference	Standing	Postseason
**Indiana State Sycamores** (MVC) (1982–1985)
1982–83	Indiana State	9–19	5–13	T-7th	
1983–84	Indiana State	14–14	6–10	7th	
1984–85	Indiana State	14–15	6–10	T-6th	
Indiana State:		37–48 (.435)	17–33		
Total:		37–48 (.435)			
National champion Postseason invitational champion Conference regular season champion Conference regular season and conference tournament champion Division regular season champion Division regular season and conference tournament champion Conference tournament champion
