= WJNZ =

WJNZ may refer to:

- WJNZ (AM), a radio station (1000 AM) licensed to serve Robertsdale, Alabama, United States
- 1140 WVHF (AM) Kentwood, Michigan — was WJNZ from 2003 from 2010 as "1140 Jamz" in the Grand Rapids area
- 1680 WPRR (AM) Ada, Michigan — was WJNZ from 1998 to 2003 as "1680 Jamz" in the Grand Rapids area
- 94.3 WREB Greencastle, Indiana — was WJNZ from 1979 to 1995
