= Todd Mitchell =

American basketball player (born 1966)

Personal information
- Born: July 26, 1966 (age 60) Toledo, Ohio, U.S.
- Listed height: 6 ft 7 in (2.01 m)
- Listed weight: 205 lb (93 kg)

Career information
- High school: St. Francis (Toledo, Ohio)
- College: Purdue (1984–1988)
- NBA draft: 1988: 2nd round, 43rd overall pick
- Drafted by: Denver Nuggets
- Playing career: 1988–1999
- Position: Small forward
- Number: 34, 32

Career history
- 1988: Rapid City Thrillers
- 1988–1989: Miami Heat
- 1989: San Antonio Spurs
- 1989–1990: Olympiacos
- 1990–1991: Cholet Basket
- 1991: La Crosse Catbirds
- 1991–1992: Pallacanestro Firenze
- 1992: Rockford Lightning
- 1992–1993: Pallacanestro Marsala
- 1993–1994: Papagou
- 1994–1995: Baloncesto Salamanca
- 1995: Sioux Falls Skyforce
- 1995–1996: Montpellier
- 1996–1997: Bnei Herzliya
- 1997: Rolly Pistoia
- 1997–1998: Strasbourg IG
- 1998–1999: Lugano Tigers

Career highlights
- Greek League All-Star (1994 I); French League Scoring Champion (1996); CBA All-Rookie Team (1989); Third-team All-American – NABC (1988); 2× First-team All-Big Ten (1987, 1988)
- Stats at NBA.com
- Stats at Basketball Reference

Ernest Todd Mitchell (born July 26, 1966) is an American former professional basketball player. He was a 6-foot-7-inch (201 cm), 205-pound (93 kg) small forward, and played college basketball for the Purdue Boilermakers from 1984 to 1988.

== College career ==
Born in Toledo, Ohio, Mitchell attended Purdue University, located in West Lafayette, Indiana, where he played basketball under head coach Gene Keady. Along with teammate Troy Lewis, he led the Boilermakers to two Big Ten Conference titles during his junior and senior seasons, along with a Sweet Sixteen appearance in the 1988 NCAA Tournament. He was named first-team All-Big Ten in both his junior and senior seasons.

== Professional career ==
Mitchell was the 43rd overall pick in the 1988 NBA draft by the Denver Nuggets in the second round. He played one season in the National Basketball Association (NBA). In his lone season split with the San Antonio Spurs and the Miami Heat, he averaged 5.1 points, 2.1 rebounds and 0.9 assists per game.

He spent parts of 3 seasons in the Continental Basketball Association (CBA); averaging 18.4 ppg over his 92-game career.

His European League career spanned 9 seasons, he spent one season in the Israeli League.

== Career statistics ==
Legend
GP	Games played	GS	Games started	MPG	Minutes per game
FG%	Field goal percentage	3P%	3-point field goal percentage	FT%	Free throw percentage
RPG	Rebounds per game	APG	Assists per game	SPG	Steals per game
BPG	Blocks per game	PPG	Points per game	**Bold**	Career high

=== NBA ===
==== Regular season ====
Year	Team	GP	GS	MPG	FG%	3P%	FT%	RPG	APG	SPG	BPG	PPG
1988–89	Miami	**22**	0	14.5	**.466**	–	**.600**	**2.1**	**.9**	**.7**	**.1**	**5.4**
1988–89	San Antonio	2	0	**16.5**	.222	–	.250	1.5	.5	.5	.0	2.5
Career		24	0	14.7	.443	–	.578	2.1	.9	.7	.1	5.1
