= Zach Edey =

Canadian basketball player (born 2002)

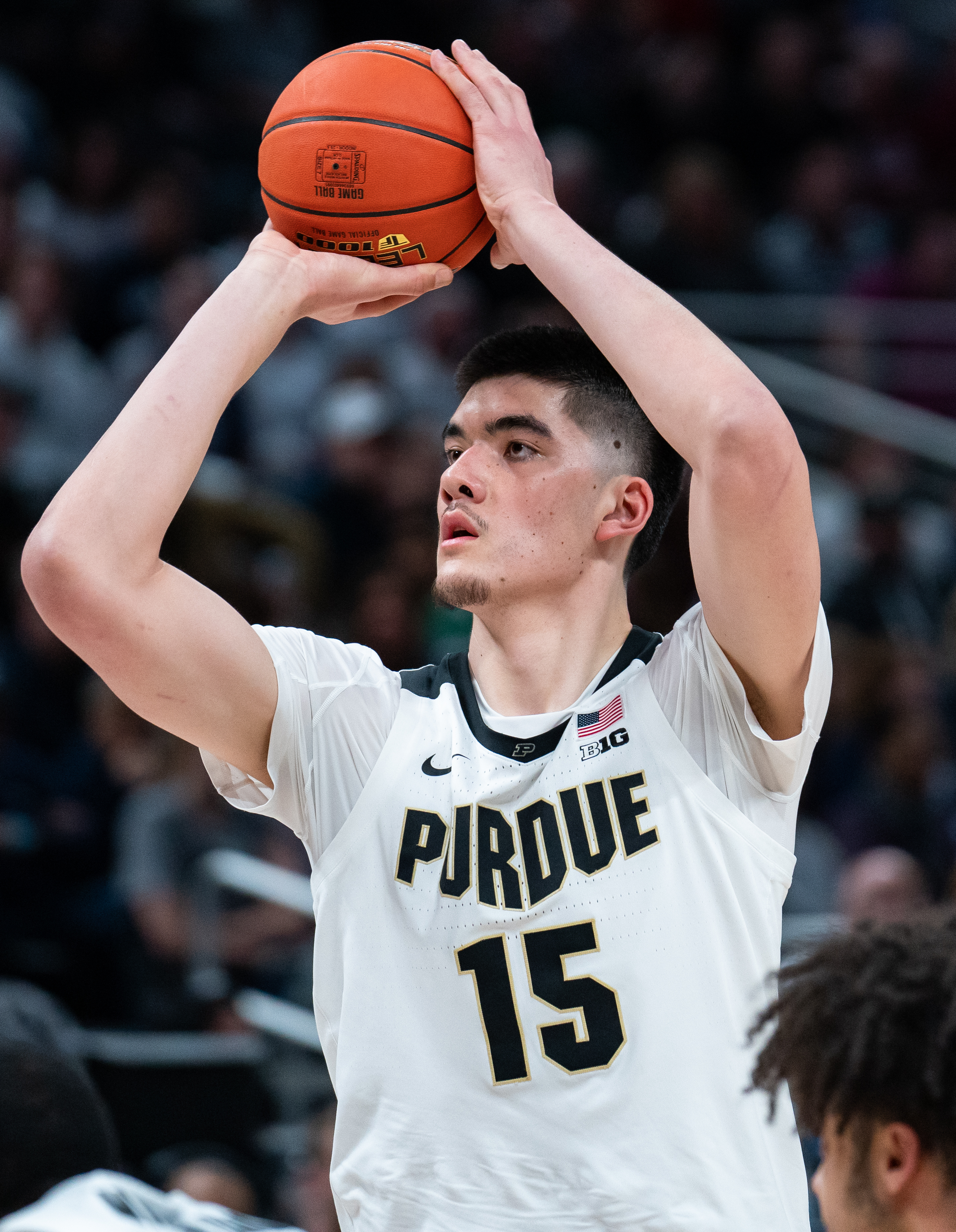
- Edey with Purdue in 2022

No. 14 – Memphis Grizzlies
- Position: Centre
- League: NBA

Personal information
- Born: May 14, 2002 (age 24) Toronto, Ontario, Canada
- Listed height: 7 ft 4 in (2.24 m)
- Listed weight: 305 lb (138 kg)

Career information
- High school: Leaside (Toronto, Ontario); IMG Academy (Bradenton, Florida)
- College: Purdue (2020–2024)
- NBA draft: 2024: 1st round, 9th overall pick
- Drafted by: Memphis Grizzlies
- Playing career: 2024–present

Career history
- 2024–present: Memphis Grizzlies

Career highlights
- NBA All-Rookie First Team (2025); 2× National college player of the year (2023, 2024); 2× Consensus first-team All-American (2023, 2024); 2× Pete Newell Big Man Award (2023, 2024); 2× Kareem Abdul-Jabbar Award (2023, 2024); Lute Olson Award (2024); NCAA scoring champion (2024); 2× Big Ten Male Athlete of the Year (2023, 2024); 2× Big Ten Player of the Year (2023, 2024); 2× First-Team All-Big Ten (2023, 2024); Second-team All-Big Ten (2022); 2× Big Ten All-Defensive Team (2023, 2024); Big Ten All-Freshman Team (2021); Big Ten tournament MVP (2023)
- Stats at NBA.com
- Stats at Basketball Reference
Medals
Men's basketball
Representing Canada
FIBA World Cup
Bronze medal – third place	2023 Philippines–Japan–Indonesia
FIBA Under-19 World Cup
Bronze medal – third place	2021 Latvia	Team

Zachry Cheyne Edey (/ˈiːdi/ EE-dee; born May 14, 2002) is a Canadian professional basketball player for the Memphis Grizzlies of the National Basketball Association (NBA). He played college basketball for the Purdue Boilermakers, leading the team to the NCAA Division I men's basketball championship game in his final year. At the close of the 2023 season, Edey was named the Big Ten Player of the Year and consensus National Player of the Year, repeating both in 2024. He was selected by the Memphis Grizzlies in the first round of the 2024 NBA draft.

== Early life ==
Zachry Cheyne Edey was born in Toronto on May 14, 2002, to Julia and Glen Edey. His 6-foot-3-inch (1.91 m) mother was born to Chinese immigrants in Toronto, where she grew up and played basketball; his father is white. Edey grew up playing ice hockey as well as baseball, which his father also played growing up. As a grade 10 student at Leaside High School in Toronto, Edey started playing basketball with the Northern Kings Amateur Athletic Union program.

Edey moved to the United States and attended IMG Academy in Bradenton, Florida. He joined their second-tier team in his first year, working daily with IMG coach and former NBA player Daniel Santiago. Edey was promoted to the school's national team the following year. A consensus three-star recruit, he reclassified to the 2020 class and committed to playing college basketball for Purdue over offers from Baylor and Santa Clara, among others.

== College career ==
=== Freshman season ===
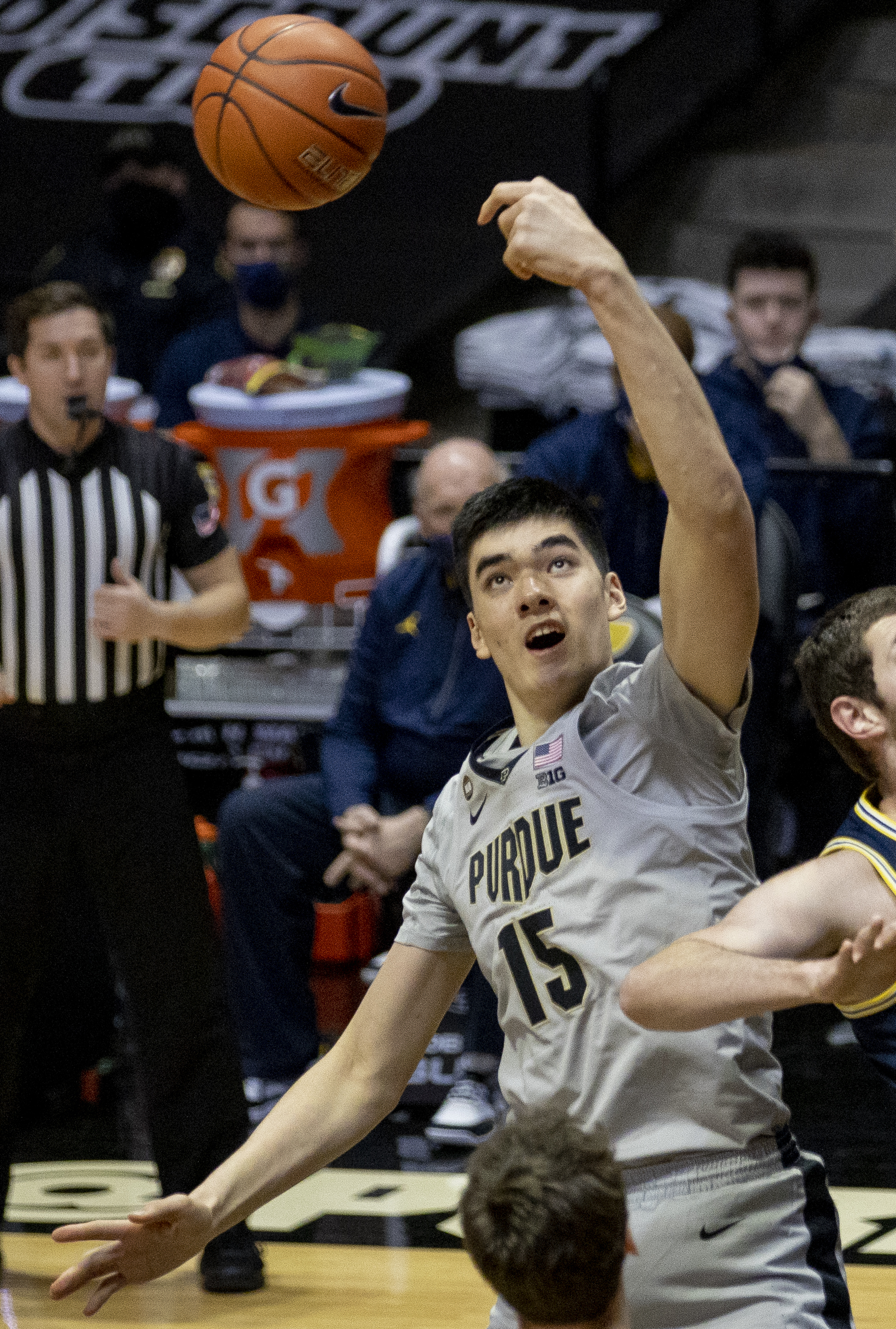
Edey jumps for the ball during a 2021 game

In his freshman season at Purdue University, Edey was listed at 7 ft 4 in (2.24 m), making him the tallest player in Big Ten history. On March 2, 2021, he recorded a season-high 21 points and seven rebounds off the bench in a 73–69 win over Wisconsin. Sharing playing time with fellow centre Trevion Williams, he averaged 8.7 points, 4.4 rebounds and 1.1 blocks in 14 minutes per game, earning Big Ten All-Freshman Team honours.

=== Sophomore season ===
To begin his sophomore year, Edey moved into a starting role. On January 3, 2022, he recorded a then-career-high 24 points and 10 rebounds in 20 minutes in a 74–69 loss to Wisconsin. On February 26, 2022, Edey recorded a career-high 25 points in 22 minutes in a 68–65 loss to Michigan State. As a sophomore, he averaged career highs in every category except free throw percentage, averaging 14.4 points, 7.7 rebounds, 1.1 assists, and 1.2 blocks in only 19 minutes per game. Following the conclusion of the season, Edey was named to the second-team All-Big Ten.

=== Junior season ===
On December 17, 2022, Edey became both the 55th player in Purdue's history to reach 1,000 career points and the 11th player in Purdue's history to reach 100 career blocks.

During the 2022–23 season, Edey received Big Ten Player of the Week six times, tying the school record for most awards in a single season (Caleb Swanigan, 2016–17) and rising to second most all-time in men's basketball in the Big Ten (Evan Turner, 2009–10).

At the close of the season, Edey was named the Big Ten Player of the Year and Sporting News National Player of the Year. He was also named a consensus first-team All-American. After the end of the 2022–23 school year, Edey was named the Big Ten Athlete of the Year across all men's sports, sharing honors with women's recipient Caitlin Clark.

=== Senior season ===
On May 31, 2023, Edey announced that he was opting out of the 2023 NBA draft to return to Purdue for his senior season. On January 5, 2024, Edey became the second player in Purdue history to reach 1000 career rebounds, following Joe Barry Carroll. On January 28, 2024, Edey scored 26 points in a win against Rutgers to surpass 2,000 for his collegiate career points, making him just the sixth player in Big Ten Conference history to have 2,000 points and 1,000 rebounds.

On February 4, in a win against Wisconsin, Edey set two different school records. He scored in double figures for the 74th consecutive game, passing Rick Mount. Edey also broke Terry Dischinger's record for double-doubles as he secured the 55th of his career. In addition to his school records, he reached 200 career blocks in the game. That week, Edey was named Big Ten Player of the Week for the 10th time in his career. This tied Evan Turner for the most awards in Big Ten history. Eventually, Edey would win Big Ten Player of the Week a record 12 times.

Edey currently holds the Purdue career record for rebounds with 1,321, passing Joe Barry Carroll in a game against Ohio State on February 18, 2024. He also holds the career record for points with 2,516, passing Rick Mount on March 16, 2024.

On February 26, 2024, it was announced that Edey would not use his extra year of eligibility gained from COVID-19 to return to Purdue for the 2024–25 season. Instead, Edey declared for the 2024 NBA Draft and received a green room invite, but declined, preferring to watch the draft at Purdue instead.

On April 7, 2024, Edey was named Naismith College Player of the Year for the second year in a row. He was the first to win the award back to back since Ralph Sampson in 1982 and 1983. Edey repeated as Big Ten men's athlete of the year, again sharing honors with Clark.

== Professional career ==
On June 26, 2024, Edey was selected with the ninth overall pick by the Memphis Grizzlies in the 2024 NBA draft and on July 6, he signed with the Grizzlies. On October 23, Edey made his NBA debut, putting up five points and five rebounds in 15 minutes played, as he fouled out, in a 126–124 win over the Utah Jazz. Edey became the first rookie in NBA history to foul out in 15 minutes or less time in their debut game. On April 5, 2025, he grabbed 21 rebounds against the Detroit Pistons, marking a franchise rookie record and personal career-high.

Edey finished his rookie season with averages of 9.2 points, 8.3 rebounds, and 1.3 blocks, earning him an All-Rookie First Team selection. In game four of the Grizzlies' first-round postseason matchup against the Oklahoma City Thunder, he recorded 7 blocks in an eventual series-ending loss, marking the most blocks by a rookie in a playoff game in 15 years.

On June 10, 2025, Edey underwent surgery to re-stabilize and address excessive ligamentous laxity in his left ankle; he was given a recovery timetable of four months. On November 30, Edey posted a career-high 32 points with 17 rebounds and five blocks on 16-for-20 shooting from the field, leading the Grizzlies to a 113–107 victory over the Sacramento Kings. He made 11 starts for Memphis during the regular season, recording averages of 13.6 points, 11.1 rebounds, and 1.1 assists. On March 24, 2026, Edey was officially ruled out for the remainder of the season due to a left ankle injury.

== National team career ==
Edey represented Canada at the 2021 FIBA Under-19 Basketball World Cup in Latvia. He averaged 15.1 points, a tournament-high 14.1 rebounds and 2.3 blocks per game, leading his team to the bronze medal and being named to the all-tournament team.

On May 24, 2022, Edey agreed to a three-year commitment to play with the Canadian senior men's national team.

Edey was selected by coach Jordi Fernández to play in 2023 FIBA Basketball World Cup, becoming the only college player in the team. On September 3, they qualified to the quarter-finals, securing a berth at the 2024 Summer Olympics, the first Olympics appearance for Team Canada since 2000. Canada won the bronze medal over the United States in the third-place game. This was Canada's first-ever World Cup medal, and first medal at a major global tournament since the 1936 Summer Olympics.

Prior to the 2024 Olympics, Edey was set to compete for a roster spot with Team Canada. However, on June 30, 2024, Edey withdrew himself from consideration, opting instead to play for the Grizzlies in the NBA Summer League.

== Career statistics ==
Legend
GP	Games played	GS	Games started	MPG	Minutes per game
FG%	Field goal percentage	3P%	3-point field goal percentage	FT%	Free throw percentage
RPG	Rebounds per game	APG	Assists per game	SPG	Steals per game
BPG	Blocks per game	PPG	Points per game	**Bold**	Career high

*	Led NCAA Division I

=== NBA ===
==== Regular season ====
Year	Team	GP	GS	MPG	FG%	3P%	FT%	RPG	APG	SPG	BPG	PPG
2024–25	Memphis	**66**	**55**	21.5	.580	**.346**	.709	8.3	1.0	.5	1.3	9.2
2025–26	Memphis	11	11	**25.8**	**.633**	.200	**.781**	**11.1**	**1.1**	**.6**	**1.9**	**13.6**
Career		77	66	22.1	.589	.333	.723	8.7	1.0	.6	1.4	9.9

==== Playoffs ====
Year	Team	GP	GS	MPG	FG%	3P%	FT%	RPG	APG	SPG	BPG	PPG
2025	Memphis	4	4	27.0	.667	–	.714	7.8	1.8	.0	2.5	6.3
Career		4	4	27.0	.667	–	.714	7.8	1.8	.0	2.5	6.3

=== College ===
Year	Team	GP	GS	MPG	FG%	3P%	FT%	RPG	APG	SPG	BPG	PPG
2020–21	Purdue	28	2	14.7	.597	—	.714	4.4	.4	.1	1.1	8.7
2021–22	Purdue	37	33	19.0	**.648**	—	.649	7.7	1.2	.2	1.2	14.4
2022–23	Purdue	34	34	31.7	.607	—	**.734**	**12.9**	1.5	.2	2.1	22.3
2023–24	Purdue	**39**	**39**	**32.0**	.623	**.500**	.711	12.2	**2.0**	**.3**	**2.2**	**25.2***
Career		138	108	24.9	.621	.500	.706	9.6	1.3	.2	1.7	18.2

== See also ==
- List of NCAA Division I men's basketball players with 2,000 points and 1,000 rebounds
- List of tallest players in NBA history
