= Bob Ford (basketball) =

American basketball player (born 1950)

Personal information
- Born: January 26, 1950 (age 76) Evansville, Indiana
- Listed height: 6 ft 7 in (2.01 m)
- Listed weight: 228 lb (103 kg)

Career information
- High school: North Huskies (Evansville, Indiana)
- College: Purdue (1968–1972)
- NBA draft: 1972: 5th round, 74th overall pick
- Drafted by: New York Knicks
- Playing career: 1972–1975
- Position: Forward
- Number: 30

Career history
- 1972–1973: Memphis Tams
- 1974–1975: Lafayette Lasers

Career highlights
- Academic All-American (1972); 2× All-Big Ten (1971, 1972); First-team Parade All-American (1968)
- Stats at Basketball Reference

Robert Alan Ford (born January 26, 1950) is a retired American basketball player. He graduated from Evansville North High School in 1968 and led North High School to the 1967 Indiana high school basketball championship. He played on the 1968 Indiana High School All-Star basketball team against the Kentucky All-Stars. He played college basketball at Purdue University where he totaled 1,244 points and 648 rebounds. He was the team MVP during his junior season (1970–71), leading the Boilermakers to the NIT. He played briefly for the Memphis Tams of the ABA in the 1972–73 season, averaging 1.6 points and 1.3 rebounds in nine games played; a mid-season trade with the Indiana Pacers failed to materialize and Ford was released. Ford spent the 1974–75 basketball season with the Lafayette Lasers of the short lived IBA. During his collegiate career, he was a 2x member of USA Basketball (National) teams, the silver medal-winning 1970 World University Games squad and the 1971 Pan-Am Games team. Currently, Bob Ford is a full-time telecaster for Purdue Boilermaker men's basketball games.
