= Pete Mount =

American basketball player (1925–1990)

Personal information
- Born: March 10, 1925 Lebanon, Indiana, U.S.
- Died: February 3, 1990 (aged 64) Lebanon, Indiana, U.S.
- Listed height: 6 ft 4 in (1.93 m)
- Listed weight: 185 lb (84 kg)

Career information
- High school: Lebanon (Lebanon, Indiana)
- Position: Forward

Career history
- 1946–1947: Sheboygan Red Skins

Paul Winford "Pete" Mount (March 10, 1925 – February 3, 1990) was an American professional basketball player. He played in the National Basketball League for the Sheboygan Red Skins during the 1946–47 season and averaged 1.5 points per game. Pete was the father of American Basketball Association player Rick Mount. In his post-basketball career, he worked at the Detroit Diesel Allison Plant in Indianapolis, Indiana.
