= Carl McNulty =

American basketball player (1930–2020)

Personal information
- Born: February 14, 1930 Logansport, Indiana, U.S.
- Died: January 14, 2020 (aged 89) Kokomo, Indiana, U.S.
- Listed height: 6 ft 3 in (1.91 m)
- Listed weight: 185 lb (84 kg)

Career information
- High school: Washington Township (Washington Township, Indiana)
- College: Purdue (1949–1952)
- NBA draft: 1952: 11th round, 96th overall pick
- Drafted by: Minneapolis Lakers
- Position: Shooting guard
- Number: 6

Career history
- 1955: Milwaukee Hawks
- Stats at NBA.com
- Stats at Basketball Reference

Carl Edwin McNulty (February 14, 1930 – January 14, 2020) was an American basketball player. He played college basketball for the Purdue Boilermakers, and later played for the Milwaukee Hawks in the National Basketball Association (NBA).

== Early life ==
McNulty was born in Logansport, Indiana.

== College career ==
McNulty played at Purdue University from 1949 to 1952. Despite standing at just 6 feet 3 inches (1.91 m), he played center for the Boilermakers. As a senior, he averaged 18 points per game for Purdue, setting school records for single-game and single-season scoring for the second consecutive season. During his college career he was a first team All-Big Ten selection and a two-time Purdue Most Valuable Player. At the time of his death he still held the Purdue record for rebounds in one game with 27, set on February 19, 1951.

== Later life ==
McNulty was selected in the 1952 NBA draft by the Minneapolis Lakers. He toured the United States as a member of the College All-Stars, playing a series of games vs. the Harlem Globetrotters, then entered the U.S. military. After spending two years in the U.S. Navy to meet his military obligation, he returned to civilian life. He played for the Milwaukee Hawks in one game in February 1955 and scored two points.

He chose a career as a high school coach and educator. He spent 29 years as a coach; at Rochester, Elwood, LaPorte and Indianapolis' Warren Central; achieving a record of 413-277 (.599) and 21 winning seasons. In his 18 years (1967–1984) at Kokomo High School, he had a record of 256-172 (.598) and won 13 Sectional titles.

McNulty and his 1979-80 Kokomo High School team were at the center of a story in the April 14, 1980 issue of The New Yorker. Written by Herbert Warren Wind, the story was about Indiana basketball in general, and the Kokomo High School team was chosen as a good representative of the state's high school basketball culture. Wind profiled McNulty and followed the team's progress through that year's state tournament.

== Death ==
McNulty died on January 14, 2020, in Kokomo, Indiana. He was 89 years old.

== Career statistics ==
Legend
GP	Games played	GS	Games started	MPG	Minutes per game
FG%	Field goal percentage	3P%	3-point field goal percentage	FT%	Free throw percentage
RPG	Rebounds per game	APG	Assists per game	SPG	Steals per game
BPG	Blocks per game	PPG	Points per game	**Bold**	Career high

=== NBA ===
==== Regular season ====
Year	Team	GP	MPG	FG%	FT%	RPG	APG	PPG
1954–55	Milwaukee	1	14.0	.167	–	.0	.0	2.0
