= Rick Mount =

American basketball player (born 1947)

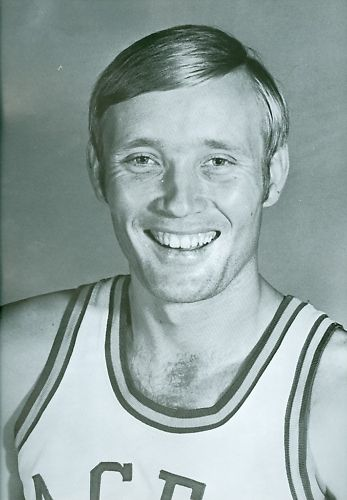

Personal information
- Born: January 5, 1947 (age 79) Lebanon, Indiana, U.S.
- Listed height: 6 ft 4 in (1.93 m)
- Listed weight: 180 lb (82 kg)

Career information
- High school: Lebanon (Lebanon, Indiana)
- College: Purdue (1967–1970)
- NBA draft: 1970: 8th round, 132nd overall pick
- Drafted by: Los Angeles Lakers
- Playing career: 1970–1975
- Position: Shooting guard
- Number: 10, 30, 11, 2

Career history
- 1970–1972: Indiana Pacers
- 1972–1974: Kentucky Colonels
- 1974: Utah Stars
- 1974–1975: Memphis Sounds

Career highlights
- ABA champion (1972); 2× Consensus first-team All-America (1969, 1970); Second-team All-America – UPI (1968); Third-team All-America – AP, NABC (1968); 2× Big Ten Silver Basketball winner (1969, 1970); Indiana Mr. Basketball (1966); First-team Parade All-American (1966)
- Stats at Basketball Reference
- Collegiate Basketball Hall of Fame

Richard Carl Mount (born January 5, 1947) is an American former professional basketball player who played for Purdue University from 1966 to 1970 as well as the American Basketball Association (ABA). Mount played basketball at Lebanon Senior High School in Lebanon, Indiana, during which time he became the first high school boy representing a team sport to appear on the cover of Sports Illustrated.

== Early life ==
Rick Mount's father, Pete, was an avid basketball player who intended Rick to learn the game as well. He cut out the bottom of a peanut can so Rick could shoot tennis balls through it. Rick's first time playing with an official basketball goal was during the fourth grade at which time he was known to beat 8th and 9th graders. However, when it was time to try out for the school basketball team, he wasn't able to make a standard left-hand lay up, which was a requirement for making the roster. That night he practiced for hours until he had it down, and on the next day of tryouts, he made the team.

== High school career ==
Rick "the Rocket" Mount attended Lebanon High School in Lebanon, Indiana. There, he led his team in scoring, including 33.1 points per game (ppg) throughout his junior and senior seasons. It was at this time that he started to attract national attention. In 1965, Lebanon played Crawfordsville High School at Hinkle Fieldhouse in Indianapolis, Indiana. With 10,000 people in attendance, the team made enough money to buy a bus. He scored 57 points in that game.

On February 14, 1966, Mount appeared on the cover of Sports Illustrated, which featured him standing in front of a barn located in Boone County, Indiana. A frequent misconception is that Rick was the first high school athlete (or male high school athlete) to be featured on the cover of Sports Illustrated in 1966, though there had been several prior to this time; he was, in fact, the first high school boy representing a team sport to appear on the cover. At the end of his senior year, he won the Indiana "Mr. Basketball" award and was named "USA Basketball Yearbook Player of the Year," given to the nation's best high school player. He finished his Lebanon career with 2,595 points, at the time it was the second-highest total in Indiana high school history; as of December 2021, he is seventh.

== College career ==
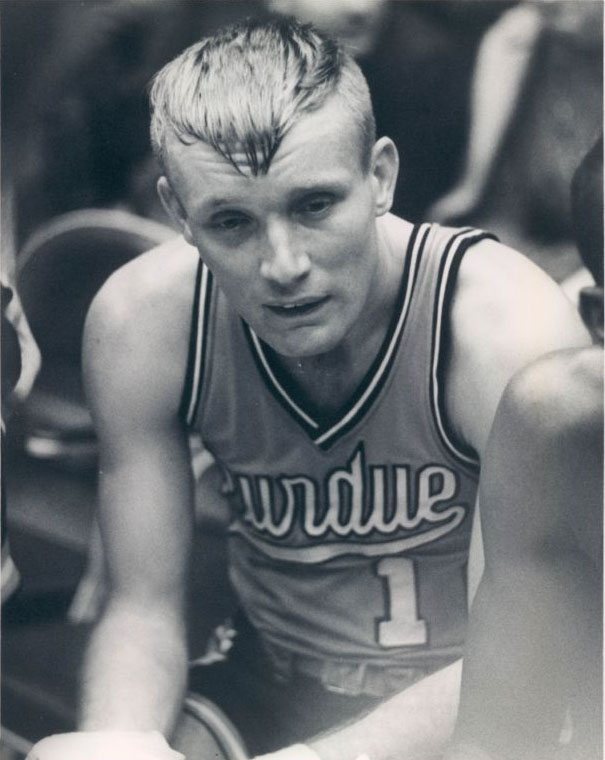
Mount during a Purdue timeout in 1968.

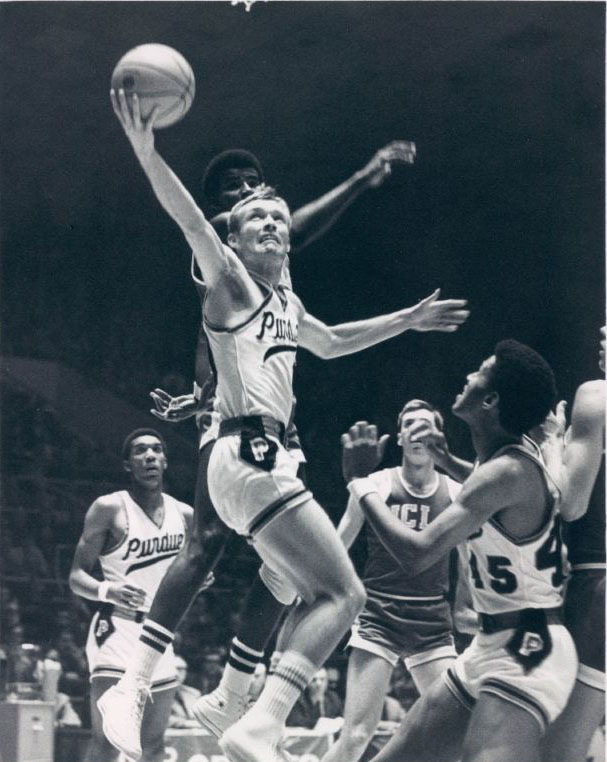
Mount goes in for a layup against the UCLA Bruins.

=== 1966–67 season ===
Mount was considering committing to University of Miami (Florida). Instead, he stayed home and attended Purdue University in West Lafayette, Indiana, just 35 miles (56 km) northwest of his hometown where he played basketball under head coach George King.

As a freshman, Mount was unable to play on the varsity team due to NCAA regulations then in effect. Rick scored 33 points in a scrimmage against the varsity team in front of 9,500 in attendance at Lambert Fieldhouse. He averaged 35 points a game while shooting 54.5 percent on the freshman squad, tallying 490 points.

=== 1967–68 season ===
In his first varsity game, Mount scored a game-high 28 points in a last-second, two-point loss to a top-ranked UCLA team and Lew Alcindor. It was also the first game played in Mackey Arena. Averaging 28.4 points a game and leading Purdue to a 15–9 record, he was named a Second Team All-American and First Team All-Big Ten his sophomore season. Following the U.S. Olympic Trials in April, he was selected as an Alternate to the U.S. National Team.

=== 1968–69 season ===
In his junior season at Purdue, along with seniors Billy Keller and Herm Gilliam, he led the Boilermakers to a Big Ten Conference title and the school's first NCAA tournament appearance, where he led the Boilers to the NCAA Championship game where they lost to a Lew Alcindor-led UCLA.

In a win against Marquette to bring the Boilers to the Final Four, Mount is remembered for his "leaping lofter" game-winning shot with two seconds left in overtime. He led all scorers in the tournament with a 40.6 point average in Purdue's three games. Purdue led the nation with 94.8 points a game during the 1968–69 season fronted by Mount's 33.3 points a game. A regular season highlight was playing against the Indiana Hoosiers. In that year, Purdue defeated Indiana 120–76 in the final game of the regular season, where Mount established a school record for most points in a game.

Mount had an unusual knack for telling if a goal wasn't balanced. He twice had officials adjust the same goal prior to the NCAA Finals game at Freedom Hall in Louisville, Kentucky. He went through the same situation earlier in the season before a game at Iowa. He led Purdue to a 23–5 record on the season. He shot 51.5 percent on the season, whereas well-known scorers such as Pete Maravich and Calvin Murphy shot no better than 46 percent. He was selected as a First Team All-American and the Big Ten Player Of The Year.

=== 1969–70 season ===
In his senior year, Mount had two 53-point games, plus a 61-point game against conference champion Iowa.Thirty-two of his 61 points were scored in the first half. Later research found that if the three-point line had existed in college basketball in 1970, he would have scored 74 points in that game, and been credited with 13 three-point field goals. The official school record is ten, held by Carsen Edwards.

Leading Purdue to an 18–6 season, he averaged 35.4 points a game and took his second straight First Team All-American and Big Ten Player of the Year honors. Mount left Purdue as the school's all-time leading scorer with 2,323 points throughout only three varsity seasons. At the time, it was also the Big Ten scoring record, surpassing the total of Indiana's Don Schlundt. It is currently held by Indiana's Calbert Cheaney's 2,613, though Cheaney's career collegiate scoring average of 19.8 falls well short of Mount's 32.3.

Mount scored in double figures for 72 consecutive games while scoring 30-plus points in 46 of those games: both remain school records. He broke numerous Purdue scoring records that were held by Dave Schellhase and Terry Dischinger. During his overall career, he led the Boilers to a 56–20 record.

Mount never received a national player of the year award. He finished behind UCLA's Lew Alcindor and LSU's Pete Maravich.

== Professional career ==
=== Indiana Pacers ===
==== 1970–1971 ====
Mount was considered an excellent pro prospect, but because the general managers of the NBA knew that Mount was already signed by the ABA, he was not drafted by the Los Angeles Lakers until the middle of the eighth round of the 1970 NBA draft. However, Mount was drafted in the ABA by the Indiana Pacers as the fourth overall pick in 1970. His legendary status in Indiana made it a foregone conclusion that he would sign with the Pacers. At the time, the ABA was the only professional league that featured a three-point line, which worked to Mount's advantage. During his first season in the ABA, Mount was offered $40,000 from Pro-Keds to wear its new suede basketball shoe. He declined the offer because he personally preferred Chuck Taylors of the Converse brand.

==== 1971–1972 ====
Playing for the Indiana Pacers and head coach Bob "Slick" Leonard he, along with George McGinnis, Mel Daniels and Bob Netolicky, led the Pacers to the 1972 ABA Championship against Rick Barry and the New York Nets. He averaged 14.2 points and 2.9 assists a game, racking up 57 three-pointers in his second season as a Pacer.

=== Kentucky Colonels ===
==== 1972–1973 ====
Rick Mount was traded to the Kentucky Colonels for the 1972–73 season. With the Colonels, he averaged 15 points a game on the season. Teamed with Dan Issel, he averaged 17 points in playoff games while leading the Colonels to the ABA Finals against his former Pacers.

=== Utah Stars ===
==== 1973–1974 ====
In the middle of the 1973–74 season, Rick was traded to the Utah Stars, where he joined Ron Boone. For the third straight season, Mount led a different team to the ABA Finals, eventually losing to the New York Nets.

According to Charley Rosen, one time Mount displayed the most astounding exhibition of pure, one-on-one shooting he ever saw. Rosen was invited by the Utah coach, Joe Mullaney, to participate in an intra-squad scrimmage. After Mullaney officially terminated the session, several players lingered around to play HORSE. Because of Mount, the Stars' rules were unique. Shots had to be perfectly clean, counted only if the ball didn't touch the rim. Despite this wrinkle, Mount won every game. In the end, only Mount and Rosen were left on the court, and Mount was able to adjust the trajectory of every jumper so that the ball hit the inner part of the backside-rim in such a way that the ball would nudge the iron, split the net, and then bounce back to him. He supposedly could do this about 90 percent of the time.

=== Memphis Sounds ===
==== 1974–1975 ====
Mount spent the last season of his ABA and professional basketball career playing for the Memphis Sounds. He averaged a career season-high scoring average of 17.1 points a game. His career was cut short due to a dislocated shoulder that he sustained during the 1974–75 season.

=== Career notes ===
Mount was among the top of the league in three-point shooting during the time he spent in the ABA, while averaging 11.8 points a game and a career total of 3,330 points. Known mainly for his scoring abilities in high school and college, Mount contributed in a greater variety of ways during his pro career. As one of the finest passers in the league, he averaged 2.4 assists, tallying a total of 676. He was also a fine free throw shooter with 82 percent accuracy. Rick shot 31.7 percent beyond the arc and held a 43.3 field goal percentage in his five seasons in the ABA.

== After retirement ==
Today, Mount lives in his hometown of Lebanon, Indiana, with his wife, Donna. His son, Rich, played on the Purdue basketball team for two seasons (1989–1991) before transferring to Virginia Commonwealth (VCU). Rich, who also played at Lebanon, left high school with the ninth most points in Indiana high school history. He currently works as a police officer in Lebanon.

Currently, Mount runs "shoot camps" for high school players throughout the Midwest, where each player will take 2,500 supervised shots. The instructional school is based solely on shooting and there is no scrimmaging involved.

An avid quail hunter, he opened Rick Mount's Sports Shop, a hunting and fishing shop. Purdue is among Mount's customers for the "Shoot-A-Way" retrieval system, a device which returns a basketball down a track to a player after a shot. Rick left college 10 credits shy of his degree; that decision later affected his opportunity to be a head coach at an Indiana high school.

In 1992, Mount and his father were both inducted into the Indiana Basketball Hall of Fame, located in New Castle, Indiana. In 2014, his son, Rich, was named to the Indiana Basketball Hall of Fame's Silver Anniversary Team.

In 2016, Mount gave an interview to The Indianapolis Star where he discussed his career and his public perception.

== See also ==
- List of NCAA Division I men's basketball players with 60 or more points in a game
