= Joe Sexson =

American baseball and basketball coach (1934–2011)

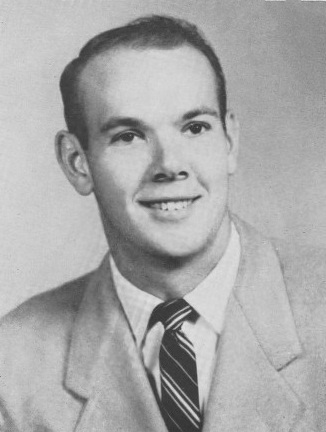
Sexson from 1961 Purdue yearbook

Joe Sexson (March 29, 1934 – April 30, 2011) was an American college basketball coach. He was the men's head coach at Butler University in Indianapolis, Indiana, from 1978 to 1989. He was the head baseball coach at Purdue University from 1960 to 1977 and an assistant basketball coach at Purdue.

Sexson was a graduate of Arsenal Technical High School in Indianapolis where he was a star athlete and the 1952 Indiana Mr. Basketball. He was also awarded the Arthur L. Trester Award for Mental Attitude, after leading Arsenal Tech to a Runner-Up finish in the state basketball tournament. He graduated Purdue where he was a 3-year starter, the team captain and All-Big Ten star on the basketball and baseball teams. When he graduated, he was the leading scorer (he is #36 on the all-time scoring list), his 16.6 ppg avg ranks in the Top Ten at Purdue. He was drafted by the New York Knicks in 1956 but chose to enter the high school teaching and coaching ranks and eventually returned to Purdue as an assistant.

He played for Head Coach Ray Eddy and later joined Eddy's staff as an assistant in 1960. He was a part of the staff that led the Boilermakers to the 1969 NCAA Title game and the 1974 National Invitational Tournament Championship.

While coaching the Butler Bulldogs, he won an Indiana Collegiate Conference (ICC) title and was named ICC Coach of the year in 1978. He also aided the Bulldogs' transition from membership in the ICC to the newly formed Midwestern City Conference. He was named the Midwestern City Conference Coach of the Year in 1984.

== Head coaching record ==
Record table
Season	Team	Overall	Conference	Standing	Postseason
Butler Bulldogs (Indiana Collegiate Conference) (1977–1978)
1977–78	Butler	15–16	6–0	1st	–
Butler Bulldogs (Independent) (1978–1979)
1978–79	Butler	11–16	–	–	–
Butler Bulldogs (Horizon League) (1979–1989)
1979–80	Butler	12–15	2–3	4th	–
1980–81	Butler	5–22	1–10	7th	–
1981–82	Butler	7–20	3–9	6th	–
1982–83	Butler	15–13	9–5	4th	–
1983–84	Butler	13–15	7–7	T–4th	–
1984–85	Butler	19–10	9–5	2nd	NIT 1st Round
1985–86	Butler	9–19	2–10	7th	–
1986–87	Butler	12–14	5–7	T–5th	–
1987–88	Butler	14–14	5–5	T–3rd	–
1988–89	Butler	11–17	3–9	7th	–
Total:		143–188 (.432)			
National champion Postseason invitational champion Conference regular season champion Conference regular season and conference tournament champion Division regular season champion Division regular season and conference tournament champion Conference tournament champion
