= Mel Garland =

American basketball coach and player

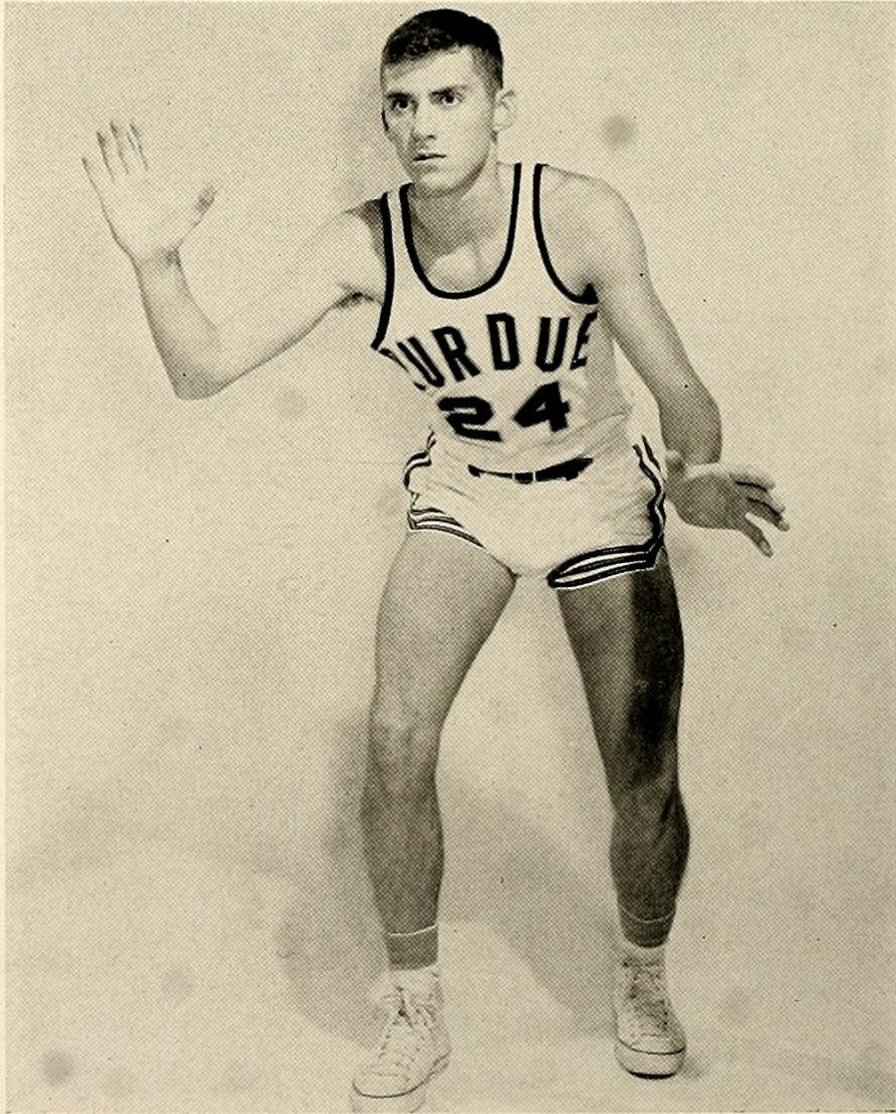
- Garland with the Purdue Boilermakers in 1963

Personal information
- Born: June 23, 1942 Indianapolis, Indiana, U.S.
- Died: March 5, 1983 (aged 40) Indianapolis, Indiana, U.S.
- Listed height: 6 ft 1 in (1.85 m)

Career information
- High school: Arsenal Tech (Indianapolis, Indiana)
- College: Purdue (1961–1964)
- NBA draft: 1964: undrafted
- Position: Guard
- Coaching career: 1964–1981

Career history

Coaching
- 1964–1967: Greenfield-Central HS
- 1967–1975: Indiana State (assistant)
- 1975–1979: Evansville Harrison HS
- 1979–1981: IUPUI

Career highlights
- AP Honorable Mention All-American (1963); All-Big Ten (1963)

Career coaching record
- College: 31–38 (.449)

Melvyn J. Garland (June 23, 1942 – March 5, 1983) was an American basketball coach and player. Born in Indianapolis, Indiana, he emerged as a star dual-sport athlete in basketball and baseball at Arsenal Technical High School. Garland attended Purdue University and played for the Boilermakers on the basketball and baseball teams. He was a member of all-conference teams in both sports but excelled at basketball, where he was an Honorable Mention All-American during his junior season.

Garland turned to coaching after his graduation and began his career at Greenfield-Central High School as the coach of the basketball, baseball and cross country teams. He joined the Indiana State Sycamores men's basketball team as an assistant coach in 1967. Garland also served as the head coach of the Sycamores golf team for four seasons until his resignation from the university in 1975. He returned to high school coaching when he served as head basketball coach at Evansville Harrison High School for four seasons.

Garland was hired as the head coach and athletic director of the IUPUI Jaguars men's basketball team in 1979. He led the team to its first winning season in school history during the 1980–81 season but his career was prematurely ended when he stepped down due to health issues midway through the 1981–82 season. Garland continued to serve as athletic director until his death from leukemia on March 5, 1983.

== High school and college career ==
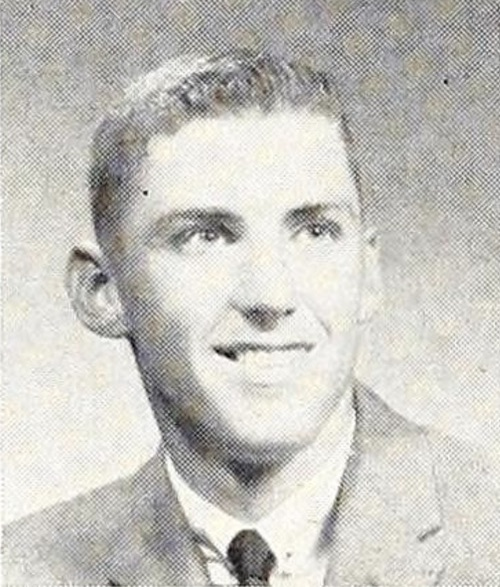
Garland in 1960

Melvyn J. Garland was born on June 23, 1942, in Indianapolis, Indiana. He attended Arsenal Technical High School in Indianapolis, where he played basketball and baseball. Garland was the Indiana Athlete of the Year and led the basketball team to a regional title during his senior season. He graduated in 1960.

Garland played college basketball and baseball for the Purdue Boilermakers and earned All-Big Ten Conference honors for both sports. He was voted the Most Valuable Player for the Boilermakers basketball team during his junior and senior seasons. Garland was an Associated Press Honorable Mention Basketball All-American in 1963.

== Coaching career ==
Garland began his coaching career in 1964 at Greenfield-Central High School in Greenfield, Indiana. While he worked as a teacher, he coached the basketball, baseball and cross country teams.

In 1967, Garland was hired to join the Indiana State Sycamores men's basketball team to serve as assistant coach. He also served as the head coach of the Sycamores golf team for four years. On March 7, 1975, Garland resigned from Indiana State alongside head coach Gordon Stauffer and assistant coach Jim Morris after the basketball team posted a second straight losing season. Garland joined Evansville Harrison High School as head coach of the basketball team from 1975 to 1979.

In 1979, Garland was appointed the head coach and athletic director of the IUPUI Jaguars men's basketball team. He compiled the first winning season in Jaguars history during the 1980–81 season. He amassed a 31–38 record over two-and-a-half seasons coached. Garland stepped down as coach mid-way through the 1981–82 season due to health problems but continued to serve as athletic director. He recommended that Robert Lovell serve as his replacement (Note: Lovell served as head coach of the Jaguars from 1982 to 1994.) and remained close to the team.

== Death and honors ==
Garland died on March 5, 1983, aged 40, of leukemia at the Indiana University Hospital. He was buried at the Oaklawn Memorial Gardens.

He was posthumously inducted into the Indiana Basketball Hall of Fame in 1993 and the IUPUI Athletics Hall of Fame in 1995. IUPUI established the Mel Garland Memorial Scholarship that is awarded annually to an athlete who embodies the spirit of Garland. Former IUPUI Athletics Director Hugh Wolf stated of Garland: "In many respects Mel Garland was the person who first caused the Indianapolis community to take notice of the IUPUI athletic program."
