= Troy Lewis =

American basketball player

Personal information
- Born: March 15, 1966 (age 60) Anderson, Indiana, U.S.
- Listed height: 6 ft 4 in (1.93 m)
- Listed weight: 190 lb (86 kg)

Career information
- High school: Anderson (Anderson, Indiana)
- College: Purdue (1984–1988)
- NBA draft: 1988: undrafted
- Position: Shooting guard

Career history
- 1988–1989: Quad City Thunder

Career highlights
- 2× First-team All-Big Ten (1987, 1988); AP honorable mention All-American (1988); Third-team Parade All-American (1984); Co-Indiana Mr. Basketball (1984); McDonald's All-American (1984)
Medals
Men's basketball
Representing the United States
World University Games
Silver medal – second place	1987 Zagreb	Men's Basketball

Troy Lewis (born March 15, 1966) is an American former professional basketball player. He is the sixth all-time leading scorer in Purdue Boilermakers men's basketball history with 2,038 points. He played guard for Purdue from 1985 to 1988.

Lewis was a First Team All-Big Ten selection in 1987 and 1988; leading the Boilermakers to consecutive Big Ten Championships and the 1988 NCAA Sweet 16. He was selected as Indiana co-Mr. Basketball with Delray Brooks in 1984. Mr. Lewis played for Anderson High School in the North Central Conference before enrolling at Purdue.

He led the Indians to the 1983 IHSAA State Finals, where they lost in an epic battle to Connersville High School; as of 2023, he remains the leading scorer in State Finals history, scoring 76 points in a single State Semi-Finals and Finals, ahead of such legendary players as Ron Bonham (69), Scott Skiles (69), George McGinnis (62), Oscar Robertson (51), Glenn Robinson (45) and John Wooden (27).

In 1997, Lewis was selected as one of the 12 members of Purdue's Centennial All-Time Men's Basketball Team. He was inducted into Purdue Intercollegiate Athletic Hall of Fame in 2010 along with Head Coach Gene Keady and teammates Todd Mitchell and Everette Stephens.

== Filmmaking career ==
Troy Lewis wrote and directed Blacklight Dream in 2017. Jack "Bald Eagle" Birdsall served as first assistant director on the film, and he and Lewis became the best of friends for the rest of their lives.

== Coaching ==
Lewis is currently an assistant boys basketball coach at Centerville High School (OH), which won two consecutive Division I state championships in 2022 and 2023. The Elks finished as state runner-up in 2024.
