= WREB =

Coordinates: 39.661°N 86.893°W

- Greencastle, Indiana; United States
- Broadcast area: West-Central Indiana
- Frequency: 94.3 MHz
- Branding: Giant FM

Programming
- Format: Classic rock
- Affiliations: ABC News Radio

Ownership
- Owner: The Original Company, Inc.
- Operator: 3 Towers Broadcasting, LLC GiantFM

History
- First air date: May 16, 1966

Technical information
- Licensing authority: FCC
- Facility ID: 54600
- Class: A
- ERP: horizontal polarization only: 3,000 watts
- HAAT: 49 meters (161 ft)

Links
- Public license information: Public file; LMS
- Webcast: Listen live
- Website: putnamcountypost.com

WREB (94.3 FM) is a radio station licensed to Greencastle, Indiana. WREB broadcasts a classic rock format. WREB began broadcasting on May 16, 1966.

On April 1, 2024, WREB changed their format from hot adult contemporary to classic rock, still under the "Giant FM" branding.

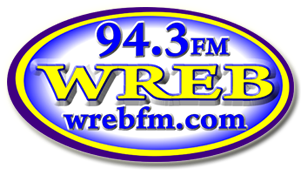
Previous logo
