= Gavitt Tipoff Games =

American college basketball conference challenge

- Conference: Big Ten Conference; Big East Conference
- League: NCAA Division I
- Founded: 2015
- Folded: 2023
- Sports fielded: College basketball
- Last champion: Big Ten Conference
- Most titles: Big Ten Conference (3)
- Broadcasters: FS1; Big Ten Network; ESPN2/ESPNU (2015)

The Gavitt Tipoff Games were an annual eight-game NCAA Division I men's college basketball series played between the Big Ten Conference and the Big East Conference early in the season. The games were played annually from 2015 through 2023 except in 2020, when they were cancelled because of the COVID-19 pandemic. As a result of the 2021–2024 NCAA conference realignment, the final year of the series was 2023.

The Gavitt Tipoff Games were played on the home courts of participating schools, with four hosted by Big Ten schools and four hosted by Big East schools each year. The eight-year deal — initially planned to run from 2015 to 2022, but instead running through 2023 because of the cancellation of the 2020 games — had each Big East team participate a minimum of six times and each Big Ten program take part a minimum of four times. The only exception was UConn, which moved from the American Athletic Conference to the Big East in 2020 and never played in the Gavitt Tipoff Games.

Each game played at a Big East campus was televised by Fox Sports 1 and each game played on a Big Ten campus was televised by Fox Sports 1 or the Big Ten Network.

The Big Ten won three series and the Big East won one. The other four series were tied.

The series was named in honor of the late Dave Gavitt (1937–2011), former athletic director at Providence College who served from 1979 to 1990 as the first commissioner of the original Big East Conference of 1979–2013.

== Conference records ==
=== Big East Conference (1–3–4) ===
Institution	Wins	Losses	DNP	Win %	Total attendance
Butler Bulldogs	2	4	2	.333	24,837
UConn Huskies	0	0	3	—	—
Creighton Bluejays	4	3	1	.571	52,377
DePaul Blue Demons	4	3	1	.571	10,827
Georgetown Hoyas	1	5	2	.167	27,354
Marquette Golden Eagles	3	4	1	.429	56,894
Providence Friars	3	3	2	.500	30,352
Seton Hall Pirates	3	3	2	.500	31,436
St. John's Red Storm	4	3	1	.571	27,313
Villanova Wildcats	3	3	2	.500	19,502
Xavier Musketeers	3	3	2	.500	31,277
OVERALL	30	34	19	.469	312,169

NOTE: UConn moved from the American Athletic Conference to the Big East Conference in 2020.

=== Big Ten Conference (3–1–4) ===
Institution	Wins	Losses	DNP	Win %	Total Attendance
Illinois Fighting Illini	1	4	3	.200	41,454
Indiana Hoosiers	4	1	3	.800	51,916
Iowa Hawkeyes	2	3	3	.400	20,352
Maryland Terrapins	3	1	4	.750	34,267
Michigan Wolverines	3	2	3	.600	35,901
Michigan State Spartans	4	0	4	1.000	29,594
Minnesota Golden Gophers	2	2	4	.500	17,299
Nebraska Cornhuskers	1	4	3	.200	31,652
Northwestern Wildcats	2	2	4	.500	11,588
Ohio State Buckeyes	3	1	4	.750	27,508
Penn State Nittany Lions	3	1	4	.750	11,785
Purdue Boilermakers	3	2	3	.600	44,598
Rutgers Scarlet Knights	2	3	3	.400	15,102
Wisconsin Badgers	1	4	3	.200	33,060
OVERALL	34	30	48	.531	406,076

== Results ==
=== 2015 Tied 4–4 ===
Date	Time	Big East team	Big Ten team	Score	Location	Television	Attendance	Leader
Tue., Nov. 17	5:00 PM	DePaul	Penn State	68–62	Bryce Jordan Center • University Park, PA	ESPNU	5,023	Big Ten (1–0)
Tue., Nov. 17	8:30 PM	No. 11 Villanova	Nebraska	87–63	The Pavilion • Villanova, PA	FS1	6,500	Tied (1–1)
Tue., Nov. 17	9:00 PM	Georgetown	No. 3 Maryland	75–71	XFINITY Center • College Park, MD	ESPN2	17,950	Big Ten (2–1)
Wed., Nov. 18	7:00 PM	Providence	Illinois	60–59	Dunkin' Donuts Center • Providence, RI	FS1	8,069	Tied (2–2)
Thu., Nov. 19	7:00 PM	St. John's	Rutgers	61–59	Carnesecca Arena • Queens, NY	FS1	4,540	Big East (3–2)
Thu., Nov. 19	7:00 PM	Creighton	Indiana	86–65	Simon Skjodt Assembly Hall • Bloomington, IN	BTN	17,472	Tied (3–3)
Thu., Nov. 19	9:00 PM	Marquette	Iowa	89–61	BMO Harris Bradley Center • Milwaukee, WI	FS1	13,297	Big Ten (4–3)
Fri., Nov. 20	9:00 PM	Xavier	No. 24 Michigan	86–70	Crisler Center • Ann Arbor, MI	BTN	11,967	Tied (4–4)
WINNERS ARE IN BOLD. HOME TEAM IN ITALICS. Game Times in EST. Rankings from AP Poll (Nov 16). Did not participate: Butler, Seton Hall (Big East); Michigan State, Minnesota, Northwestern, Ohio State, Purdue, Wisconsin (Big Ten)

=== 2016 Tied 4–4 ===
Date	Time	Big East team	Big Ten team	Score	Location	Television	Attendance	Leader
Mon., Nov. 14	7:00 PM	No. 3 Villanova	No. 15 Purdue	79–76	Mackey Arena • West Lafayette, IN	BTN	14,846	Big East (1–0)
Tue., Nov. 15	6:30 PM	Georgetown	Maryland	76–75	Verizon Center • Washington, D.C.	FS1	13,145	Tied (1–1)
Tue., Nov. 15	9:00 PM	No. 22 Creighton	No. 9 Wisconsin	79–67	CenturyLink Center • Omaha, NE	FS1	17,879	Big East (2–1)
Wed., Nov. 16	7:00 PM	Butler	Northwestern	70–68	Hinkle Fieldhouse • Indianapolis, IN	FS1	7,858	Big East (3–1)
Thu., Nov. 17	7:00 PM	Providence	Ohio State	72–67	Value City Arena • Columbus, OH	BTN	11,089	Big East (3–2)
Thu., Nov. 17	8:30 PM	DePaul	Rutgers	66–59	Allstate Arena • Rosemont, IL	FS1	4,057	Tied (3–3)
Thu., Nov. 17	9:00 PM	Seton Hall	Iowa	91–83	Carver–Hawkeye Arena • Iowa City, IA	BTN	10,391	Big East (4–3)
Fri., Nov. 18	9:00 PM	St. John's	Minnesota	92–86	Williams Arena • Minneapolis, MN	BTN	8,873	Tied (4–4)
WINNERS ARE IN BOLD. HOME TEAM IN ITALICS. Game Times in EST. Rankings from AP Poll (Nov 14). Sources: Did not participate: Marquette, Xavier (Big East); Illinois, Indiana, Michigan, Michigan State, Nebraska, Penn State (Big Ten)

=== 2017 Tied 4–4 ===
Date	Time	Big East team	Big Ten team	Score	Location	Television	Attendance	Leader
Mon., Nov. 13	6:30 PM	Providence	No. 14 Minnesota	86–74	Dunkin' Donuts Center • Providence, RI	FS1	10,214	Big Ten (1–0)
Tue., Nov. 14	8:30 PM	Marquette	No. 19 Purdue	86–71	BMO Harris Bradley Center • Milwaukee, WI	FS1	13,307	Big Ten (2–0)
Wed., Nov. 15	6:30 PM	No. 22 Seton Hall	Indiana	84–68	Prudential Center • Newark, NJ	FS1	8,452	Big Ten (2–1)
Wed., Nov. 15	8:30 PM	Butler	Maryland	79–65	Xfinity Center • College Park, MD	FS1	16,317	Big Ten (3–1)
Wed., Nov. 15	9:00 PM	Creighton	No. 20 Northwestern	92–88	Allstate Arena • Rosemont, IL	BTN	6,384	Big Ten (3–2)
Thu., Nov. 16	6:30 PM	St. John's	Nebraska	79–56	Carnesecca Arena • New York City, NY	FS1	4,652	Tied (3–3)
Thu., Nov. 16	8:30 PM	No. 15 Xavier	Wisconsin	80–70	Kohl Center • Madison, WI	FS1	17,287	Big East (4–3)
Fri., Nov. 17	8:30 PM	DePaul	Illinois	82–73	State Farm Center • Champaign, IL	BTN	11,254	Tied (4–4)
WINNERS ARE IN BOLD. HOME TEAM IN ITALICS. Game Times in EST. Rankings from AP Poll (Nov 13). Sources: Did not participate: Georgetown; Villanova (Big East); Iowa, Michigan, Michigan State, Ohio State, Penn State, Rutgers (Big Ten)

=== 2018 Big Ten 5–3 ===
Date	Time	Big East team	Big Ten team	Score	Location	Television	Attendance	Leader
Tue., Nov. 13	6:30 PM	Xavier	Wisconsin	77–68	Cintas Center • Cincinnati, OH	FS1	10,312	Big Ten (1–0)
Tue., Nov. 13	8:30 PM	Georgetown	Illinois	88–80	State Farm Center • Champaign, IL	FS1	14,656	Tied (1–1)
Wed., Nov. 14	6:30 PM	No. 8 Villanova	No. 18 Michigan	73–46	Finneran Pavilion • Villanova, PA	FS1	6,501	Big Ten (2–1)
Wed., Nov. 14	7:30 PM	Seton Hall	Nebraska	80–57	Pinnacle Bank Arena • Lincoln, NE	BTN	15,713	Big Ten (3–1)
Wed., Nov. 14	8:30 PM	No. 24 Marquette	Indiana	96–73	Simon Skjodt Assembly Hall • Bloomington, IN	FS1	17,222	Big Ten (4–1)
Thu., Nov. 15	7:00 PM	Creighton	Ohio State	69–60	CHI Health Center Omaha • Omaha, NE	FS1	17,146	Big Ten (5–1)
Thu., Nov. 15	9:00 PM	DePaul	Penn State	72–70 ^{OT}	Wintrust Arena • Chicago, IL	FS1	3,926	Big Ten (5–2)
Fri., Nov. 16	7:00 PM	St. John's	Rutgers	84–65	Louis Brown Athletic Center • Piscataway, NJ	BTN	7,102	Big Ten (5–3)
WINNERS ARE IN BOLD. HOME TEAM IN ITALICS. Game Times in EST. Rankings from AP Poll (Nov 12). Did not participate: Butler; Providence (Big East); Iowa, Maryland, Michigan State, Minnesota, Northwestern, Purdue (Big Ten)

=== 2019 Big Ten 5–3 ===
Date	Time	Big East team	Big Ten team	Score	Location	Television	Attendance	Leader
Mon., Nov. 11	8:00 PM	DePaul	Iowa	93–78	Carver–Hawkeye Arena • Iowa City, IA	FS1	9,961	Big East (1–0)
Tue., Nov. 12	6:30 PM	Creighton	Michigan	79–69	Crisler Center • Ann Arbor, MI	FS1	11,398	Tied (1–1)
Tue., Nov. 12	8:30 PM	Butler	Minnesota	64–56	Hinkle Fieldhouse • Indianapolis, IN	FS1	7,879	Big East (2–1)
Wed., Nov. 13	7:00 PM	No. 10 Villanova	No. 16 Ohio State	76–51	Value City Arena • Columbus, OH	FS1	16,419	Tied (2–2)
Wed., Nov. 13	9:00 PM	Marquette	Purdue	65–55	Fiserv Forum • Milwaukee, WI	FS1	15,659	Big East (3–2)
Wed., Nov. 13	9:00 PM	Providence	Northwestern	72–63	Welsh–Ryan Arena • Evanston, IL	BTN	5,204	Tied (3–3)
Thu., Nov. 14	6:30 PM	Georgetown	Penn State	81–66	Capital One Arena • Washington, DC	FS1	8,691	Big Ten (4–3)
Thu., Nov. 14	8:30 PM	No. 12 Seton Hall	No. 3 Michigan State	76–73	Prudential Center • Newark, NJ	FS1	14,051	Big Ten (5–3)
WINNERS ARE IN BOLD. HOME TEAM IN ITALICS. Game Times in EST. Rankings from AP Poll (Nov 12). Did not participate: St. John's; Xavier (Big East); Illinois, Indiana, Maryland, Nebraska, Rutgers, Wisconsin (Big Ten)

=== 2020 — Cancelled ===
Plans announced in May 2020 called for Butler, Creighton, Georgetown, Marquette, Providence, St. John's, Villanova, and Xavier to represent the Big East and Illinois, Indiana, Iowa, Maryland, Michigan State, Purdue, Rutgers, and Wisconsin the Big Ten in the 2020 Gavitt Tipoff Games, which were scheduled for November 16–20, 2020. After the NCAA delayed the start of the 2020–21 season from November 10 to November 25 due to the COVID-19 pandemic, however, the Big East and Big Ten jointly announced on October 28, 2020, that the 2020 Gavitt Tipoff Games were cancelled and the series would be on hiatus for a year. In their statement, the two conferences also announced their intention to resume the games during the 2021–22 season.

=== 2021 Big East 6–2 ===
Date	Time	Big East team	Big Ten team	Score	Location	Television	Attendance	Leader
Mon., Nov. 15	7:00 PM	Marquette	No. 10 Illinois	67–66	Fiserv Forum • Milwaukee, WI	FS1	14,631	Big East (1–0)
Mon., Nov. 15	9:00 PM	Providence	Wisconsin	63–58	Kohl Center • Madison, WI	FS1	15,773	Big East (2–0)
Tue., Nov. 16	7:00 PM	Creighton	Nebraska	77–69	Pinnacle Bank Arena • Lincoln, NE	FS1	15,939	Big East (3–0)
Tue., Nov. 16	9:00 PM	Seton Hall	No. 4 Michigan	67–65	Crisler Center • Ann Arbor, MI	FS1	12,536	Big East (4–0)
Wed., Nov. 17	7:00 PM	Butler	Michigan State	73–52	Hinkle Fieldhouse • Indianapolis, IN	FS1	9,100	Big East (4–1)
Wed., Nov. 17	9:00 PM	St. John's	Indiana	76–74	Simon Skjodt Assembly Hall • Bloomington, IN	FS1	17,222	Big East (4–2)
Thu., Nov. 18	6:30 PM	Xavier	No. 19 Ohio State	71–65	Cintas Center • Cincinnati, OH	FS1	10,379	Big East (5–2)
Thu., Nov. 18	8:30 PM	DePaul	Rutgers	73–70	Wintrust Arena • Chicago, IL	FS1	2,844	Big East (6–2)
WINNERS ARE IN BOLD. HOME TEAM IN ITALICS.Game Times in EST. Rankings from AP Poll. Did not participate: UConn, Georgetown, Villanova (Big East); Iowa, Maryland, Minnesota, Northwestern, Penn State, Purdue (Big Ten)

=== 2022 Big Ten 6–2 ===
Date	Time	Big East team	Big Ten team	Score	Location	Television	Attendance	Leader
Mon., Nov. 14	7:00 PM	DePaul	Minnesota	69–53	Williams Arena • Minneapolis, MN	BTN	8,426	Big East (1–0)
Mon., Nov. 14	8:30 PM	Butler	Penn State	68–62	Bryce Jordan Center • University Park, PA	FS1	6,762	Tied (1–1)
Tue., Nov. 15	6:30 PM	Georgetown	Northwestern	75–63	Capital One Arena • Washington, D.C.\Washington, DC	FS1	5,518	Big Ten (2–1)
Tue., Nov. 15	8:30 PM	Marquette	Purdue	75–70	Mackey Arena • West Lafayette, IN	FS1	14,876	Big Ten (3–1)
Wed., Nov. 16	7:30 PM	Seton Hall	Iowa	83–67	Prudential Center • Newark, NJ	FS1	8,933	Big Ten (4–1)
Thu., Nov. 17	6:30 PM	St. John's	Nebraska	70–50	Carnesecca Arena • Queens, NY	FS1	3,933	Big Ten (4–2)
Fri., Nov. 18	6:00 PM	Xavier	No. 12 Indiana	81–79	Cintas Center • Cincinnati, OH	FS1	10,586	Big Ten (5-2)
Fri., Nov. 18	8:00 PM	Villanova	Michigan State	73–71	Breslin Center • East Lansing, MI	FS1	14,797	Big Ten (6–2)
WINNERS ARE IN BOLD. HOME TEAM IN ITALICS. Game Times in EST. Rankings from AP Poll. Did not participate: UConn, Creighton, Providence (Big East); Illinois, Maryland, Michigan, Ohio State, Rutgers, Wisconsin (Big Ten)

=== 2023 Tied 4–4 ===
Date	Time	Big East team	Big Ten team	Score	Location	Television	Attendance	Leader
Mon., Nov. 13	6:30 PM	St. John's	Michigan	89–73	Madison Square Garden • New York, NY	FS1	14,188	Big Ten (1–0)
Mon., Nov. 13	8:30 PM	Xavier	No. 2 Purdue	83–71	Mackey Arena • West Lafayette, IN	FS1	14,876	Big Ten (2–0)
Tue., Nov. 14	6:00 PM	Providence	Wisconsin	72–59	Amica Mutual Pavilion • Providence, RI	FS1	12,069	Big Ten (2–1)
Tue., Nov. 14	8:00 PM	No. 4 Marquette	No. 23 Illinois	71–64	State Farm Center • Champaign, IL	FS1	15,544	Tied (2–2)
Tue., Nov. 14	10:00 PM	No. 8 Creighton	Iowa	92–84	CHI Health Center Omaha • Omaha, NE	FS1	17,352	Big East (3–2)
Wed., Nov. 15	8:30 PM	Georgetown	Rutgers	71–60	Jersey Mike's Arena • Piscataway, NJ	FS1	8,000	Tied (3–3)
Fri., Nov. 17	6:30 PM	Butler	No. 18 Michigan State	74–54	Breslin Center • East Lansing, MI	FS1	14,797	Big Ten (4–3)
Fri., Nov. 17	8:30 PM	No. 21 Villanova	Maryland	57–40	Finneran Pavilion • Villanova, PA	FS1	6,501	Tied (4–4)
WINNERS ARE IN BOLD. HOME TEAM IN ITALICS. Game Times in EST. Rankings from AP Poll. Did not participate: UConn, DePaul, Seton Hall (Big East); Indiana, Minnesota, Nebraska, Northwestern, Ohio State, Penn State (Big Ten)
