= 2021–22 Rutgers Scarlet Knights men's basketball team =

American college basketball season

2021–22 Rutgers Scarlet Knights men's basketball

NCAA tournament, First Four
- Conference: Big Ten Conference
- Record: 18–14 (12–8 Big Ten)
- Head coach: Steve Pikiell (6th season)
- Assistant coaches: Karl Hobbs; Brandin Knight; T. J. Thompson
- Home arena: Jersey Mike's Arena

2021–22 Big Ten Conference men's basketball standings
	Conf.				Overall
Team	W		L	PCT	W		L	PCT
No. 19 Illinois	15	–	5	.750	23	–	10	.697
No. 14 Wisconsin	15	–	5	.750	25	–	8	.758
No. 10 Purdue	14	–	6	.700	29	–	8	.784
Rutgers	12	–	8	.600	18	–	14	.563
No. 16 Iowa †	12	–	8	.600	26	–	10	.722
Ohio State	12	–	8	.600	20	–	12	.625
Michigan State	11	–	9	.550	23	–	13	.639
Michigan	11	–	9	.550	19	–	15	.559
Indiana	9	–	11	.450	21	–	14	.600
Maryland	7	–	13	.350	15	–	17	.469
Penn State	7	–	13	.350	14	–	17	.452
Northwestern	7	–	13	.350	15	–	16	.484
Nebraska	4	–	16	.200	10	–	22	.313
Minnesota	4	–	16	.200	13	–	17	.433
† Conference tournament winner Rankings from AP poll

The 2021–22 Rutgers Scarlet Knights men's basketball team represented Rutgers University–New Brunswick during the 2021–22 NCAA Division I men's basketball season. The Scarlet Knights were led by sixth-year head coach Steve Pikiell and played their home games at Jersey Mike's Arena in Piscataway, New Jersey as members of the Big Ten Conference. They finished the season 18–14, 12–8 in Big Ten play to finish a three-way tie for fourth place. As the No. 4 seed in the Big Ten tournament, they lost in the quarterfinals to Iowa. The Knights received an at-large bid to the NCAA tournament for the second consecutive year as a No. 11 seed in the West region. There they lost in the First Four to Notre Dame in double overtime.

== Previous season ==
In a season limited due to the ongoing COVID-19 pandemic, the Knights finished the 2020–21 season 16–12, 10–10 in Big Ten play to finish in a tie for sixth place. As the No. 7 seed in the Big Ten tournament, they defeated Indiana in the second round before losing to Illinois in the quarterfinals. They received an at-large bid to the NCAA tournament, their first NCAA Tournament appearance since 1991. As the No. 10 seed in the Midwest region, they defeated Clemson in the first round before losing to Houston in the second round.

== Offseason ==
=== Departures ===
Name	Number	Pos.	Height	Weight	Year	Hometown	Reason for departure
Daniel Lobach	2	F	6'7"	210	RS Freshman	Durham, NC	Walk-on; Transferred to Samford
Montez Mathis	10	G	6'4"	210	Junior	Baltimore, MD	Transferred to St. John's
Mamadou Doucoure	11	F	6'9"	250	RS Junior	Bamako, Mali	Transferred to La Salle
Myles Johnson	15	C	6'11"	255	RS Junior	Long Beach, CA	Graduate transferred to UCLA
Nick Brooks	23	G	6'1"	185	RS Senior	Somerset, NJ	Walk-on; graduated
Jacob Young	42	G	6'2"	185	RS Senior	Houston, TX	Graduate transferred to Oregon

=== Incoming transfers ===
Name	Number	Pos.	Height	Weight	Year	Hometown	Previous college
Aundre Hyatt	5	F	6'6"	227	RS Junior	The Bronx, NY	LSU
Ralph Gonzales-Agee	35	F	6'8"	245	Graduate Student	Victorville, CA	San Jose State

=== Recruiting classes ===
==== 2021 recruiting class ====
College recruiting information
Name	Hometown	School	Height	Weight	Commit date
Jalen Miller; PG	Frederick, MD	Bishop Walsh School	6 ft 3 in (1.91 m)	190 lb (86 kg)	Aug 14, 2020
Jalen Miller; PG	Recruit ratings: Rivals: 247Sports:				
Overall recruit ranking:
Note: In many cases, Scout, Rivals, 247Sports, On3, and ESPN may conflict in their listings of height and weight.; In these cases, the average was taken. ESPN grades are on a 100-point scale.; Sources: "2021 Team Ranking". Rivals.

==== 2022 Recruiting class ====
College recruiting information (2022)
Name	Hometown	School	Height	Weight	Commit date
Braeden Moore #34 PF	Nashville, TN	Christ Presbyterian Academy	6 ft 5 in (1.96 m)	190 lb (86 kg)	Jul 29, 2021
Braeden Moore #34 PF	Recruit ratings: Rivals: 247Sports: ESPN: (80)				
Derek Simpson #43 PG	Medford, NJ	Lenape High School	6 ft 2 in (1.88 m)	165 lb (75 kg)	Aug 8, 2021
Derek Simpson #43 PG	Recruit ratings: Rivals: ESPN: (79)				
Overall recruit ranking:
Note: In many cases, Scout, Rivals, 247Sports, On3, and ESPN may conflict in their listings of height and weight.; In these cases, the average was taken. ESPN grades are on a 100-point scale.; Sources: "2022 Team Ranking". Rivals.

== Roster ==
2021–22 Rutgers Scarlet Knights men's basketball team
Players
Coaches

Pos.	#	Name	Height	Weight	Year	Previous school	Hometown
G	0	Geo Baker	6 ft 4 in (1.93 m)	185 lb (84 kg)	GS	Proctor Academy	Derry, NH
F	1	Oskar Palmquist	6 ft 8 in (2.03 m)	220 lb (100 kg)	RS So	Marks Gymnasieskola	Kinna, Sweden
G	2	Jalen Miller	6 ft 2 in (1.88 m)	200 lb (91 kg)	Fr	Bishop Walsh	Frederick, MD
F	3	Mawot Mag	6 ft 7 in (2.01 m)	216 lb (98 kg)	So	Prolific Prep	Melbourne, Australia
G	4	Paul Mulcahy	6 ft 6 in (1.98 m)	213 lb (97 kg)	Jr	Gill St. Bernard's	Bayonne, NJ
F	5	Aundre Hyatt	6 ft 6 in (1.98 m)	227 lb (103 kg)	RS Jr	Miller School; LSU	The Bronx, NY
F	10	Andrew Fulin (W)	6 ft 6 in (1.98 m)	195 lb (88 kg)	Jr	Northern Valley Regional	Demarest, NJ
C	11	Clifford Omoruyi	6 ft 11 in (2.11 m)	240 lb (109 kg)	So	Roselle Catholic	Benin City, Nigeria
F	21	Dean Reiber	6 ft 10 in (2.08 m)	225 lb (102 kg)	So	Northwest Guilford	Greensboro, NC
G	22	Caleb McConnell	6 ft 7 in (2.01 m)	200 lb (91 kg)	Sr	SPIRE Academy	Jacksonville, FL
G/F	24	Ron Harper Jr.	6 ft 6 in (1.98 m)	245 lb (111 kg)	Sr	Don Bosco Prep	Franklin Lakes, NJ
G	25	Aiden Terry (W)	5 ft 10 in (1.78 m)	160 lb (73 kg)	So	Bullitt Central	Mount Washington, KY
G	30	Logan Stephens (W)	6 ft 2 in (1.88 m)	197 lb (89 kg)	Fr	Woodward Academy	Decatur, GA
F	35	Ralph Gonzales-Agee	6 ft 8 in (2.03 m)	245 lb (111 kg)	GS	Silverado; San Jose State	Victorville, CA
G/F	45	Jaden Jones	6 ft 8 in (2.03 m)	220 lb (100 kg)	RS Fr	St. Louis Christian Academy	Dallas, TX
F/C	55	Luke Nathan (W)	6 ft 11 in (2.11 m)	240 lb (109 kg)	GS	Randolph	Randolph, NJ

Head coach

- Steve Pikiell (Connecticut)

Assistant coach(es)

- Karl Hobbs (Connecticut)
- Brandin Knight (Pittsburgh)
- T. J. Thompson (George Washington)

Legend

- (C) Team captain
- (S) Suspended
- (I) Ineligible
- (W) Walk-on
- Injured
- Current redshirt

Roster

== Schedule and results ==
On December 9, Rutgers upset then-top-ranked Purdue, 70–68, at home, as Ron Harper Jr. hit a buzzer-beating three-pointer from near mid-court as time expired to down the Boilermakers. It was the first time in program history that the Scarlet Knights had ever beaten a #1-ranked team.

Date time, TV	Rank^{#}	Opponent^{#}	Result	Record	High points	High rebounds	High assists	Site (attendance) city, state
Regular season
November 10, 2021*; 7:00 p.m., BTN+		Lehigh; Garden State Classic	W 73–70 ^{OT}	1–0	16 – Omoruyi	10 – Harper Jr.	5 – Mulcahy	Jersey Mike's Arena (8,000); Piscataway, NJ
November 13, 2021*; 2:00 p.m., BTN+		Merrimack; Garden State Classic	W 48–35	2–0	13 – Harper Jr.	13 – Omoruyi	6 – Baker	Jersey Mike's Arena (8,000); Piscataway, NJ
November 16, 2021*; 8:30 p.m., BTN		NJIT; Garden State Classic	W 75–61	3–0	20 – Harper Jr.	13 – Harper Jr.	4 – Baker	Jersey Mike's Arena (8,009); Piscataway, NJ
November 18, 2021*; 8:30 p.m., FS1		at DePaul; Gavitt Tipoff Games	L 70–73	3–1	19 – Harper Jr.	11 – Harper Jr.	6 – Baker	Wintrust Arena (2,844); Chicago, IL
November 22, 2021*; 7:00 p.m., BTN+		Lafayette	L 51–53	3–2	14 – Omoruyi	9 – Omoruyi	5 – Harper Jr.	Jersey Mike's Arena (8,017); Piscataway, NJ
November 27, 2021*; 2:00 p.m., SNY		at UMass	L 83–85	3–3	16 – Omoruyi	8 – Omoruyi	9 – McConnell	Mullins Center (1,881); Amherst, MA
November 30, 2021*; 9:00 p.m., ESPN2		Clemson; ACC–Big Ten Challenge	W 74–64	4–3	23 – Harper Jr.	9 – Tied	7 – Mulcahy	Jersey Mike's Arena (8,050); Piscataway, NJ
December 3, 2021; 7:00 p.m., ESPN2		at Illinois	L 51–86	4–4 (0–1)	10 – Jones	5 – Jones	4 – Tied	State Farm Center (14,501); Champaign, IL
December 9, 2021; 7:00 p.m., BTN		No. 1 Purdue	W 70–68	5–4 (1–1)	30 – Harper Jr.	10 – Harper Jr.	8 – Mulcahy	Jersey Mike's Arena (8,000); Piscataway, NJ
December 12, 2021*; 7:30 p.m., FS1		at No. 23 Seton Hall; Rivalry/Garden State Hardwood Classic	L 63–77	5–5	13 – Tied	12 – McConnell	3 – McConnell	Prudential Center (11,606); Newark, NJ
December 18, 2021*; 5:00 p.m., BTN		Rider	Canceled due to COVID issues at Rutgers					Jersey Mike's Arena; Piscataway, NJ
December 29, 2021*; 1:00 p.m., BTN		Maine	W 80–64	6–5	19 – Harper Jr.	8 – Omoruyi	5 – Baker	Jersey Mike's Arena (7,638); Piscataway, NJ
January 1, 2022*; 5:00 p.m., BTN		Central Connecticut	W 79–48	7–5	19 – Omoruyi	12 – Omoruyi	8 – Mulcahy	Jersey Mike's Arena (7,780); Piscataway, NJ
January 4, 2022; 7:00 p.m., BTN		Michigan	W 75–67	8–5 (2–1)	27 – Baker	12 – Omoruyi	7 – Mulcahy	Jersey Mike's Arena (8,014); Piscataway, NJ
January 8, 2022; 2:00 p.m., BTN		Nebraska	W 93–65	9–5 (3–1)	29 – Harper Jr.	7 – Mulcahy	8 – Mulcahy	Jersey Mike's Arena (8,000); Piscataway, NJ
January 11, 2022; 6:30 p.m., BTN		at Penn State	L 49–66	9–6 (3–2)	12 – Omoruyi	12 – Omoruyi	4 – Mulcahy	Bryce Jordan Center (9,063); University Park, PA
January 15, 2022; 2:00 p.m., BTN		at Maryland	W 70–59	10–6 (4–2)	31 – Harper Jr.	10 – Omoruyi	7 – Baker	Xfinity Center (11,052); College Park, MD
January 19, 2022; 8:30 p.m., BTN		Iowa	W 48–46	11–6 (5–2)	15 – Harper Jr.	14 – Omoruyi	7 – Mulcahy	Jersey Mike's Arena (8,000); Piscataway, NJ
January 22, 2022; 12:00 p.m., BTN		at Minnesota	L 65–68	11–7 (5–3)	25 – Baker	7 – Omoruyi	9 – Mulcahy	Williams Arena (10,794); Minneapolis, MN
January 25, 2022; 7:00 p.m., BTN		Maryland	L 60–68	11–8 (5–4)	16 – Harper Jr.	13 – Omoruyi	7 – Mulcahy	Jersey Mike's Arena (8,000); Piscataway, NJ
January 29, 2022; 6:30 p.m., BTN		at Nebraska	W 63–61	12–8 (6–4)	14 – Baker	9 – Omoruyi	4 – Baker	Pinnacle Bank Arena (15,671); Lincoln, NE
February 1, 2022; 7:00 p.m., BTN		at Northwestern	L 78–79 ^{OT}	12–9 (6–5)	31 – Mulcahy	7 – Tied	7 – Mulcahy	Welsh–Ryan Arena (3,079); Evanston, IL
February 5, 2022; 4:00 p.m., FS1		No. 13 Michigan State	W 84–63	13–9 (7–5)	17 – Tied	9 – McConnell	12 – Mulcahy	Jersey Mike's Arena (8,117); Piscataway, NJ
February 9, 2022; 7:00 p.m., BTN		No. 16 Ohio State	W 66–64	14–9 (8–5)	25 – Baker	6 – Mulcahy	6 – Tied	Jersey Mike's Arena (8,019); Piscataway, NJ
February 12, 2022; 2:00 p.m., FS1		at No. 14 Wisconsin	W 73–65	15–9 (9–5)	21 – Harper Jr.	8 – Omoruyi	5 – Mulcahy	Kohl Center (17,287); Madison, WI
February 16, 2022; 7:00 p.m., BTN		No. 12 Illinois	W 70–59	16–9 (10–5)	16 – Harper Jr.	13 – Omoruyi	7 – Mulcahy	Jersey Mike's Arena (8,236); Piscataway, NJ
February 20, 2022; 5:30 p.m., FS1		at No. 5 Purdue	L 72–84	16–10 (10–6)	15 – Mulcahy	6 – Tied	6 – Tied	Mackey Arena (14,804); West Lafayette, IN
February 23, 2022; 7:00 p.m., BTN		at Michigan	L 62–71	16–11 (10–7)	19 – Harper Jr.	9 – McConnell	3 – Harper Jr.	Crisler Center (11,336); Ann Arbor, MI
February 26, 2022; 6:00 p.m., BTN		No. 13 Wisconsin	L 61–66	16–12 (10–8)	19 – Baker	10 – Omoruyi	4 – Baker	Jersey Mike's Arena (8,227); Piscataway, NJ
March 2, 2022; 7:00 p.m., BTN		at Indiana	W 66–63	17–12 (11–8)	19 – Harper Jr.	12 – Omoruyi	4 – Harper Jr.	Simon Skjodt Assembly Hall (17,222); Bloomington, IN
March 6, 2022; 12:00 p.m., BTN		Penn State	W 59–58	18–12 (12–8)	15 – Harper	6 – McConnell	6 – Mulcahy	Jersey Mike's Arena (8,399); Piscataway, NJ
Big Ten tournament
March 11, 2022; 2:00 p.m., BTN	(4)	vs. (5) No. 24 Iowa; Quarterfinals	L 74–84	18–13	23 – Baker	7 – Omoruyi	9 – Mulcahy	Bankers Life Fieldhouse (15,848); Indianapolis, IN
NCAA tournament
March 16, 2022*; 9:10 pm, TruTV	(11 W)	vs. (11 W) Notre Dame; First Four	L 87–89 ^{2OT}	18–14	23 – McConnell	11 – McConnell	6 – Mulcahy	UD Arena (12,516); Dayton, OH
*Non-conference game. ^{#}Rankings from AP Poll. (#) Tournament seedings in parentheses. W=West. All times are in Eastern Time.

== Rankings ==
Ranking movements Legend: ██ Increase in ranking ██ Decrease in ranking — = Not ranked RV = Received votes
	Week																				
Poll	Pre	1	2	3	4	5	6	7	8	9	10	11	12	13	14	15	16	17	18	19	Final
AP	RV	RV	—	—											RV	RV					Not released
Coaches	RV	RV^	—	—											RV	RV					

Coaches did not release a Week 1 poll.
