= Gabe Brown =

American basketball player (born 2000)

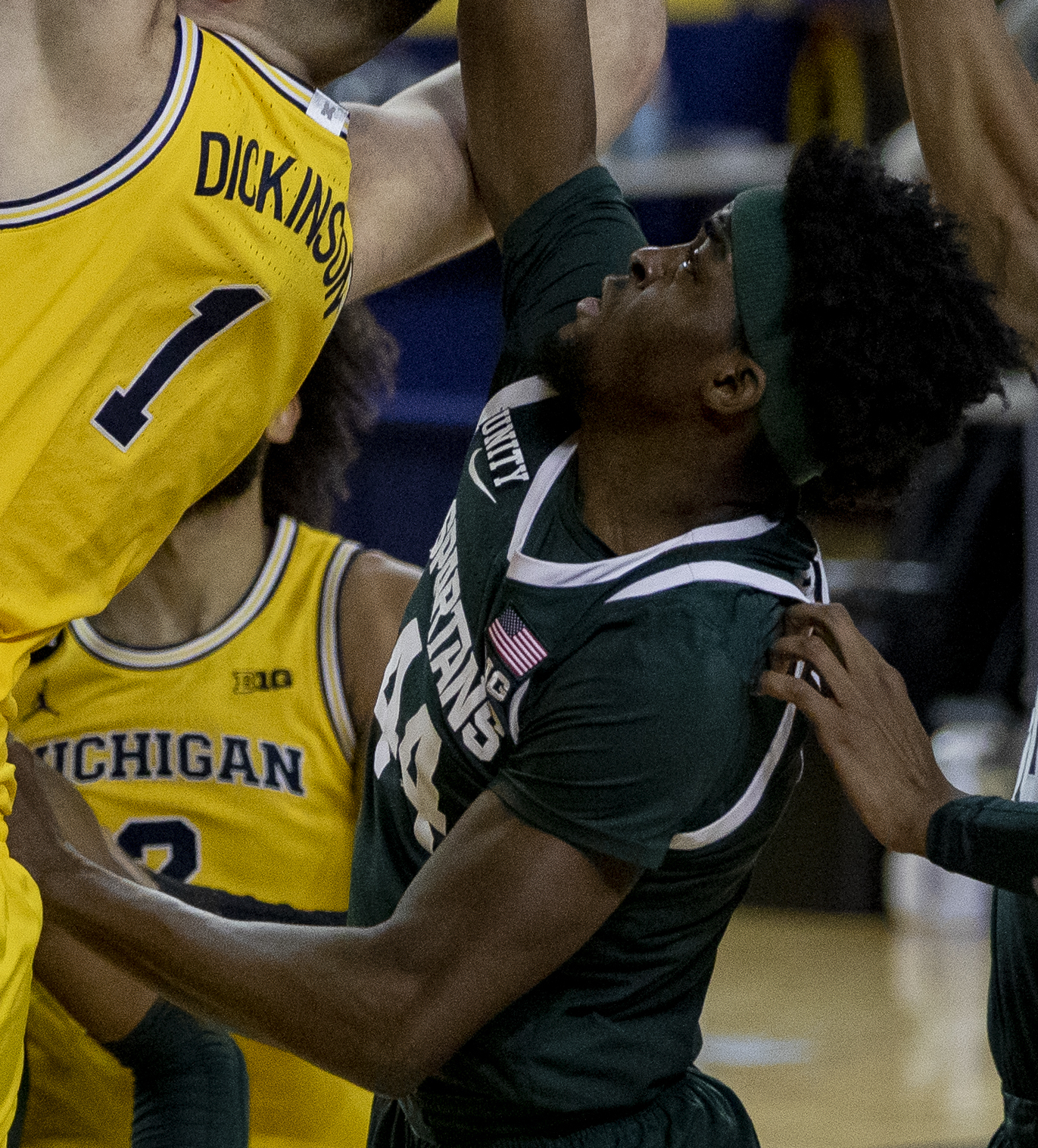
- Brown with Michigan State in 2021

No. 44 – Tofaş
- Position: Small forward
- League: BSL; EuroCup

Personal information
- Born: March 5, 2000 (age 26) Ypsilanti, Michigan
- Listed height: 6 ft 7 in (2.01 m)
- Listed weight: 207 lb (94 kg)

Career information
- High school: Belleville (Belleville, Michigan)
- College: Michigan State (2018–2022)
- NBA draft: 2022: undrafted
- Playing career: 2022–present

Career history
- 2022–2023: Raptors 905
- 2023–2024: Varese
- 2024–2025: Trapani Shark
- 2025–2026: Strasbourg
- 2026–present: Tofaş

Career highlights
- Third-team All-Big Ten – Coaches (2022)
- Stats at NBA.com
- Stats at Basketball Reference

Gabriel Thomas Brown (born March 5, 2000) is an American professional basketball player for Tofaş of the Turkish Basketbol Süper Ligi (BSL) and the EuroCup. He played college basketball for the Michigan State Spartans.

== High school career ==
Brown played basketball for Belleville High School in Belleville, Michigan. He did not make the varsity team to start his sophomore season but was promoted for the final eight games. As a junior, Brown averaged 15.9 points and 5.7 rebounds per game. In his senior season, he averaged 18.6 points, 5.7 rebounds and 2.1 assists per game. Brown was a four-star recruit and committed to playing college basketball for Michigan State.

== College career ==
As a freshman at Michigan State, Brown had a limited role on a team that reached the Final Four of the NCAA tournament, averaging 2.3 points in 8 minutes per game. In his sophomore season, he averaged 6.8 points and 3.6 rebounds per game. As a junior, Brown averaged 7.2 points and 2.7 rebounds per game. On December 29, 2021, he scored a career-high 24 points in an 81–68 win against High Point. Brown was named third-team All-Big Ten by the coaches. As a senior, he averaged 11.6 points and 3.8 rebounds per game.

== Professional career ==
=== Raptors 905 (2022–2023) ===
On August 3, 2022, Brown signed an Exhibit 10 contract with the Toronto Raptors of the NBA. He was added to the roster of their G League affiliate, Raptors 905.

=== Openjobmetis Varese (2023–2024) ===
On July 28, 2023, Brown signed with Openjobmetis Varese of the Italian Lega Basket Serie A. He parted ways with the team on December 5, 2024, after averaging 11.2 points per game.

=== Trapani Shark (2024–2025) ===
On December 6, 2024, he signed with Trapani Shark of the Lega Basket Serie A (LBA).

=== SIG Strasbourg (2025–2026) ===
On August 13, 2025, he signed with SIG Strasbourg of the French LNB Pro A.

=== Tofaş (2026–present) ===
On June 14, 2026, he signed with Tofaş of the Basketbol Süper Ligi (BSL).

== Career statistics ==
Legend
| GP | Games played | GS | Games started | MPG | Minutes per game |
| FG% | Field goal percentage | 3P% | 3-point field goal percentage | FT% | Free throw percentage |
| RPG | Rebounds per game | APG | Assists per game | SPG | Steals per game |
| BPG | Blocks per game | PPG | Points per game | **Bold** | Career high |

=== College ===
| Year | Team | GP | GS | MPG | FG% | 3P% | FT% | RPG | APG | SPG | BPG | PPG |
|---|---|---|---|---|---|---|---|---|---|---|---|---|
| 2018–19 | Michigan State | 32 | 0 | 8.0 | .390 | .372 | 1.000 | 1.2 | .1 | .1 | .1 | 2.3 |
| 2019–20 | Michigan State | 31 | 16 | 21.9 | .436 | .341 | **.947** | 3.6 | .5 | .3 | .4 | 6.8 |
| 2020–21 | Michigan State | 25 | 5 | 20.7 | **.471** | **.420** | .882 | 2.7 | .5 | .4 | **.5** | 7.2 |
| 2021–22 | Michigan State | **36** | **36** | **28.9** | .428 | .382 | .894 | **3.8** | **1.1** | **.7** | .3 | **11.6** |
| Career | | 124 | 57 | 20.1 | .435 | .379 | .896 | 2.9 | .6 | .4 | .3 | 7.1 |

== Personal life ==
Brown's father, Charles, died on May 27, 2016, at age 61 from complications after suffering two strokes. After his father's death, Brown was raised by his older brother, Nick, who played basketball for William Penn University.
