= Alfonso Plummer =

Puerto Rican basketball player (born 1997)

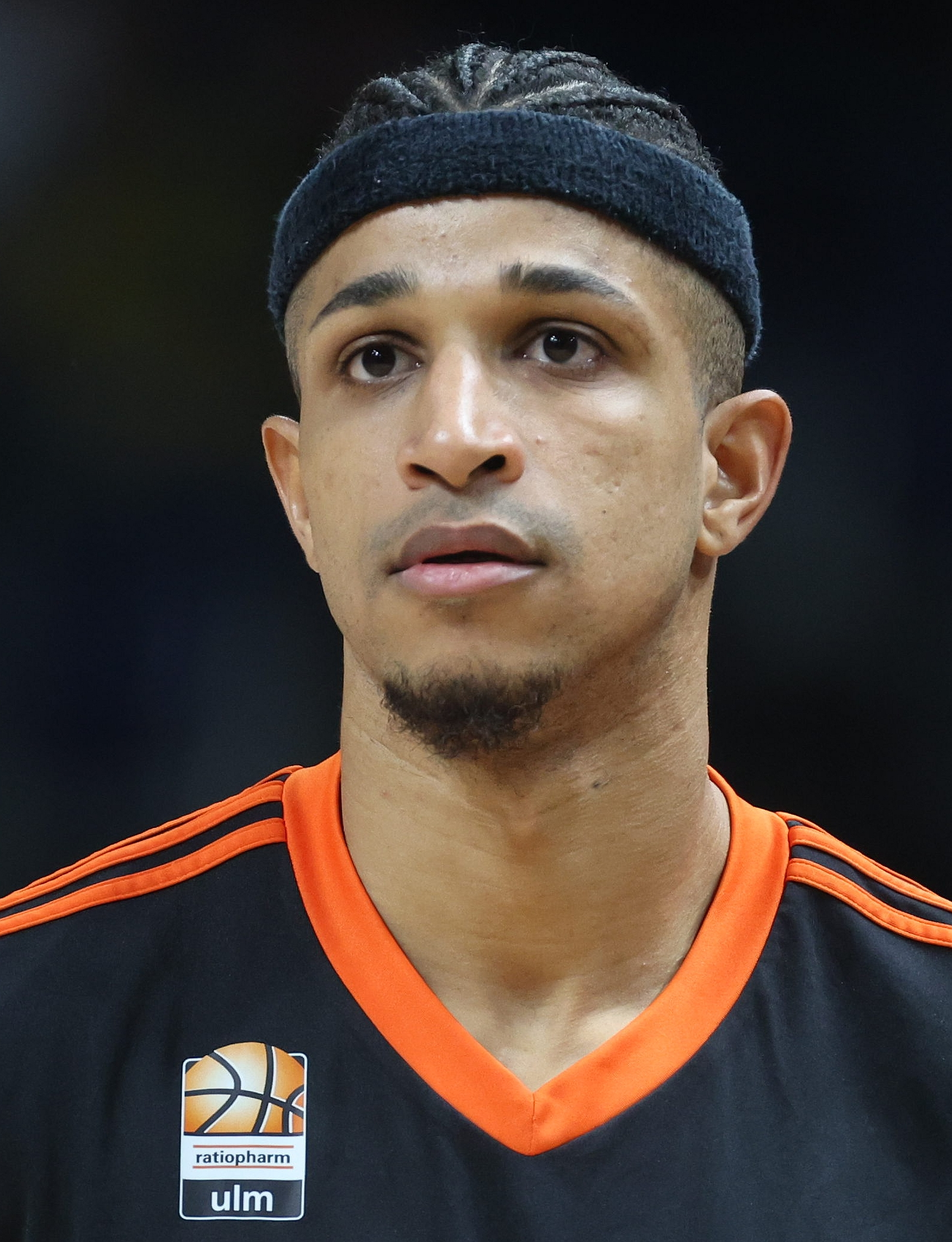
- Plummer in 2024

No. 9 – Shandong Hi-Speed Kirin
- Position: Shooting guard
- League: CBA

Personal information
- Born: September 4, 1997 (age 29) Fajardo, Puerto Rico
- Listed height: 6 ft 1 in (1.85 m)
- Listed weight: 180 lb (82 kg)

Career information
- High school: Colegio La Luz Juncos (Juncos, Puerto Rico)
- College: Arizona Western (2017–2019); Utah (2019–2021); Illinois (2021–2022)
- NBA draft: 2022: undrafted
- Playing career: 2022–present

Career history
- 2022: Lavrio
- 2022: Mexico City Capitanes
- 2022–2023: Paris Basketball
- 2023–2024: Capitanes de Arecibo
- 2024–2025: ratiopharm Ulm
- 2025: Bàsquet Manresa
- 2025–2026: Bosna
- 2026: Capitanes de Arecibo
- 2026–present: Shandong Hi-Speed Kirin

Career highlights
- BSN Rookie of the Year (2023); Third-team All-Big Ten (2022); First-team NJCAA All-American (2019)

Alfonso Roy Plummer Torres (born September 4, 1997) is a Puerto Rican professional basketball player for the Shandong Hi-Speed Kirin of the Chinese Basketball Association (CBA), and the Puerto Rican national team. He played college basketball for the Arizona Western Matadors, the Utah Utes and the Illinois Fighting Illini.

== Early life ==
Plummer was born in Fajardo, Puerto Rico. He began his basketball career as more of a slasher/scorer, but began to focus on his shooting at age 12 due to advice from his father. Plummer attended Colegio La Luz Juncos in Puerto Rico.

== College career ==
Plummer began his college career at Arizona Western College, averaging 14.9 points per game as a freshman. He helped Arizona Western finish 23–10 and won the NJCAA Region I title. Plummer scored 23 points and had nine rebounds to help win the Region I championship game, 85–81, in overtime against Eastern Arizona College during his sophomore season. As a sophomore he averaged 18.6 points and 3.5 rebounds per game. He was named a NJCAA Division 1 First Team All-American selection. Following his tenure at Arizona Western College, Plummer transferred to Utah.

On March 11, 2020, he scored a career-high 35 points including 11 three-pointers in a 71–69 loss to Oregon State. Plummer averaged 8.4 points and 1.1 rebounds per game as a junior and shot 42% from the three point line. As a senior, he averaged 13.6 points, 2.2 rebounds and 1 assist per game, shooting 38.3% from the three. He also made the Pac-12 Academic Honor Roll. Following the season Plummer opted to return for his fifth season of eligibility, granted due to the COVID-19 pandemic, and transfer to Illinois. He chose the Illini over offers from BYU, Florida, Georgia and Texas Tech. Plummer was named third-team All-Big Ten.

== Professional career ==
=== Mexico City Capitanes (2022) ===
On November 4, 2022, Plummer was named to the opening night roster for the Mexico City Capitanes.

=== Paris Basketball (2022–2023) ===
On November 17, 2022, he signed with Paris Basketball of the LNB Pro A.

=== Ratiopharm Ulm (2024–present) ===
On July 7, 2024, Plummer signed with ratiopharm Ulm of the Basketball Bundesliga.

== Career statistics ==
Legend
GP	Games played	GS	Games started	MPG	Minutes per game
FG%	Field goal percentage	3P%	3-point field goal percentage	FT%	Free throw percentage
RPG	Rebounds per game	APG	Assists per game	SPG	Steals per game
BPG	Blocks per game	PPG	Points per game	**Bold**	Career high

=== College ===
==== NCAA Division I ====
Year	Team	GP	GS	MPG	FG%	3P%	FT%	RPG	APG	SPG	BPG	PPG
2019–20	Utah	26	2	15.2	**.467**	**.420**	.750	1.1	.4	.4	.0	8.4
2020–21	Utah	25	16	28.2	.441	.383	.824	2.2	1.0	**.7**	.0	13.6
2021–22	Illinois	**33**	**29**	**30.2**	.424	.408	**.874**	**2.5**	**1.1**	.3	.0	**14.6**
Career		84	47	25.0	.439	.403	.844	1.9	.8	.5	.0	12.4

==== JUCO ====
Year	Team	GP	GS	MPG	FG%	3P%	FT%	RPG	APG	SPG	BPG	PPG
2017–18	Arizona Western	33	3	19.5	**.514**	**.458**	.776	2.3	.6	.6	.0	14.9
2018–19	Arizona Western	**34**	**30**	**29.4**	.482	.438	**.888**	**3.5**	**.7**	**.7**	**.1**	**18.6**
Career		67	33	24.5	.495	.446	.840	2.9	.7	.6	.1	16.8

== Personal life ==
Plummer majored in international studies. He is the son of Rénan Plummer and Amara Torres, and his father played professional basketball in Panama.
