= 2021–22 Michigan State Spartans men's basketball team =

American college basketball season

2021–22 Michigan State Spartans men's basketball

NCAA tournament, Second Round
- Conference: Big Ten Conference
- Record: 23–13 (11–9 Big Ten)
- Head coach: Tom Izzo (27th season)
- Associate head coach: Dwayne Stephens (19th season)
- Assistant coaches: Doug Wojcik (3rd season); Mark Montgomery (11th season)
- Captains: Gabe Brown; Malik Hall
- Home arena: Breslin Center

2021–22 Big Ten Conference men's basketball standings
	Conf.				Overall
Team	W		L	PCT	W		L	PCT
No. 19 Illinois	15	–	5	.750	23	–	10	.697
No. 14 Wisconsin	15	–	5	.750	25	–	8	.758
No. 10 Purdue	14	–	6	.700	29	–	8	.784
Rutgers	12	–	8	.600	18	–	14	.563
No. 16 Iowa †	12	–	8	.600	26	–	10	.722
Ohio State	12	–	8	.600	20	–	12	.625
Michigan State	11	–	9	.550	23	–	13	.639
Michigan	11	–	9	.550	19	–	15	.559
Indiana	9	–	11	.450	21	–	14	.600
Maryland	7	–	13	.350	15	–	17	.469
Penn State	7	–	13	.350	14	–	17	.452
Northwestern	7	–	13	.350	15	–	16	.484
Nebraska	4	–	16	.200	10	–	22	.313
Minnesota	4	–	16	.200	13	–	17	.433
† Conference tournament winner Rankings from AP poll

The 2021–22 Michigan State Spartans men's basketball team represented Michigan State University in the 2021–22 NCAA Division I men's basketball season. The Spartans were led by 27th-year head coach Tom Izzo and played their home games at Breslin Center in East Lansing, Michigan as members of the Big Ten Conference. The Spartans finished the season 23–13, 11–9 in Big Ten play to finish in a tie for seventh place. As the No. 7 seed in the Big Ten tournament, they defeated Maryland and Wisconsin to advance to the semifinals where they lost to Purdue. They received an at-large bid to the NCAA tournament as the No. 7 seed in the West region, marking MSU's 24th straight trip to the NCAA tournament, the second longest active streak. They defeated Davidson in the first round before losing to Duke in the second round.

With a win over Toledo on December 4, 2021, Izzo earned his 650th win as head coach of the Spartans. With a win over Maryland on March 6, 2022, Izzo surpassed Bob Knight for the most wins by a men's basketball coach at a Big Ten school with 663.

== Previous season ==
In a season limited due to the ongoing COVID-19 pandemic, the Spartans finished the 2020–21 season 15–13, 9–11 in Big Ten play to finish in a tie for eighth place. The 9–11 finish marked the first time the Spartans had finished with a record under .500 in conference play under Izzo. As the No. 9 seed in the Big Ten tournament, they lost to No. 8-seeded Maryland marking the first time the Spartans did not play in the quarterfinals of the Big Ten tournament in the tournament's history. The Spartans received an at-large bid to the NCAA tournament as the No. 11 seed in the East region. The selection marked the school's 23rd straight tournament appearance which was the second longest active streak of tournament appearances. In their First Four matchup, they were defeated by eventual Final Four participant UCLA. The Spartans were led by Aaron Henry who averaged 15.4 points and 5.6 rebounds per game.

== Offseason ==
=== Coaching changes ===
On April 5, 2021, it was announced that 10-year associate head coach Dane Fife had left the staff to join new Indiana coach Mike Woodson as an assistant at Fife's alma mater. This marked the first time in 10 years that the Michigan State coaching staff changed. On April 13, it was reported that MSU recruiting coordinator and former Izzo assistant Doug Wojcik had been promoted to assistant coach to replace Fife. Wojcik was previously an assistant with MSU from 2003 to 2005. Like current assistant coach Mike Garland, Wojcik left MSU for head coaching jobs before returning to MSU.

Graduate manager and former MSU player Lourawls "Tum Tum" Nairn Jr. announced he was leaving to coach at his old high school, Sunrise Christian Academy.

Izzo also announced that former assistant coach and Northern Illinois head coach Mark Montgomery would return to the staff as recruiting coordinator. Garrett Briningstool, an executive assistant to Izzo the past two years, was named director of basketball operations and chief of staff. He replaced former player David Thomas who had been director for six years and left for a private sector job. Former MSU player Matt McQuaid was named assistant director of basketball operations. Another former player, Austin Thornton, was hired as video coordinator. Julian Stall was named director of creative video.

Izzo later announced that Montgomery would be shifted to one of the three assistant coach positions while Garland would transition to an assistant to the head coach position where he would focus more on players on an individual level. This would also allow Garland to spend more time with his family.

=== Departures ===
Due to the COVID-19 pandemic, the NCAA granted an extra year of eligibility for all winter sport athletes. Despite this, fifth-year senior guard Joshua Langford announced he would not return to Michigan State. Langford later announced that he would not pursue a professional basketball career.

On March 24, former walk-on guard, Jack Hoiberg, entered his name in the transfer portal. On March 29, sophomore guard Rocket Watts entered his name in the transfer portal. On April 13, it was announced that junior forward Thomas Kithier had also entered the transfer portal. On April 19, it was reported that junior point guard Foster Loyer had also entered the transfer portal.

On April 12, junior forward Aaron Henry announced he would forgo his final two years of eligibility and enter the 2021 NBA draft. Henry was not selected in the draft, but signed a two-way deal with the Philadelphia 76ers after the draft.

Departures
Name	No.	Pos.	Height	Weight	Year	Hometown	Notes
Aaron Henry	0	F	6'6"	210	JR	Indianapolis, IN	Declared for NBA draft
Jack Hoiberg	10	G	5'11"	175	RS JR	Burr Ridge, IL	Transferred to UT Arlington
Thomas Kithier	15	F	6'8"	230	JR	Clarkston, MI	Transferred to Valparaiso
Joshua Langford	1	G	6'5"	200	GS	Huntsville, AL	Graduated
Foster Loyer	3	G	6'0"	175	JR	Clarkston, MI	Transferred to Davidson
Rocket Watts	2	G	6'2"	185	SO	Detroit, MI	Transferred to Mississippi State

=== Recruiting class ===
On April 22, 2020, four-star shooting guard Pierre Brooks announced he would play for Michigan State in 2021. Brooks would later be named Michigan's Mr. Basketball for 2021. On July 7, five-star guard Max Christie, the No. 1-ranked shooting guard in Illinois and ranked No. 13 overall nationally, announced he would also play for the Spartans in 2021. Christie was later named the 2021 Chicago Sun-Times Illinois High School Association player of the year. On August 13, Jaden Akins, a four-star point guard and the No. 70 overall player in the 2021 class, committed to MSU. On February 3, 2021, Keon Coleman, a three-star wide receiver announced he would attend Michigan State to play football, but also said he would walk-on with the basketball team as a guard. On April 30, forward Peter Nwoke announced that he would join the Spartans as a preferred walk-on during the fall.

College recruiting information
Name	Hometown	School	Height	Weight	Commit date
Jaden Akins; PG	Farmington, MI	Sunrise Christian Academy	6 ft 3 in (1.91 m)	160 lb (73 kg)	Aug 13, 2020
Jaden Akins; PG	Recruit ratings: Rivals: 247Sports: ESPN: (83)				
Pierre Brooks; SG	Detroit, MI	Douglass Academy	6 ft 5 in (1.96 m)	180 lb (82 kg)	Apr 22, 2020
Pierre Brooks; SG	Recruit ratings: Rivals: 247Sports: ESPN: (83)				
Max Christie; SG	Arlington Heights, IL	Rolling Meadows High School	6 ft 6 in (1.98 m)	195 lb (88 kg)	Jul 7, 2020
Max Christie; SG	Recruit ratings: Rivals: 247Sports: ESPN: (91)				
Overall recruit ranking:
Note: In many cases, Scout, Rivals, 247Sports, On3, and ESPN may conflict in their listings of height and weight.; In these cases, the average was taken. ESPN grades are on a 100-point scale.; Sources:

=== Incoming transfers ===
On April 28, 2021, the NCAA officially adopted a measure that would allow athletes in all sports to transfer once without sitting out a season beginning with the 2021–22 season.

On March 27, Northeastern point guard and 2021 Colonial Athletic Association Defensive Player of the Year Tyson Walker announced that he would transfer to Michigan State. Walker averaged 18.8 points and 4.8 assists per game in his final year at Northeastern. On April 23, Purdue wide receiver Maliq Carr announced that he would transfer to Michigan State to play football and walk on to the men's basketball team. In July, it was announced that two more transfers had joined the team as preferred walk-ons: Jason Whitens from Western Michigan and Michael Peterson from Ferris State. Due to the NCAA's change in the transfer policy, all four players were eligible to play immediately.

Transfers
Name	No.	Pos.	Height	Weight	Year	Hometown	Previous school
Maliq Carr	15	F	6'5"	230	RS FR	Oak Park, MI	Purdue
Michael Peterson	20	F	6'6"	200	SR	Rockford, MI	Ferris State
Tyson Walker	2	G	6'0"	170	JR	Westbury, NY	Northeastern
Jason Whitens	43	G	6'4"	185	SR	Powers, MI	Western Michigan

=== Early offseason rankings ===
Most early rankings for the 2021–22 season listed Michigan State as a preseason top-25 team. These included ESPN (No. 22), Sports Illustrated (No. 18), Yahoo! Sports (No. 13), USA Today (No. 13), CBS Sports (No. 18), Sporting News (No. 9), Stadium (No. 20), and NCAA.com (No. 16).

== Preseason ==
=== COVID-19 vaccinations ===
Izzo announced on September 28 that the entire staff and all players in the MSU program (from the coaches on down to Breslin Center janitors) had been fully vaccinated against COVID-19. Izzo stated he was proud of his team for being fully vaccinated.

=== Preseason Big Ten poll ===
Prior to the conference's annual media day, unofficial awards and a poll were chosen by a panel of writers. Michigan State was picked to finish sixth in the conference.

=== Preseason rankings ===
For the first time since 2011, the Spartans were not ranked in the initial AP poll released on October 18, 2021. MSU was 26th in the poll, receiving 87 votes. Izzo stated he was not happy about not being ranked, but understood it. The Spartans were also not ranked in the Coaches poll, but did receive votes.

=== Exhibition ===
The Spartans played two exhibition games at Breslin Center prior to the opening of the season.

The first game was on October 27 against Division II Ferris State. Gabe Brown led the Spartans with 19 points while freshman Max Christie wowed with 17 points in his debut. The Spartans won easily 92–58. The starting lineup consisted of Tyson Walker, Christie, Brown, Joey Hauser, and Marcus Bingham Jr.

The second game was against Grand Valley State on November 4. The Spartans used the same starting lineup and were led by Christie with 14 points. Hauser scored 13 points, five assists, and led the team with nine rebounds. Walker led the team with six assists in the 83–60 win.

=== Injuries ===
On November 3, it was announced that walk-on transfer Jason Whitens would miss the season with a torn ACL. He suffered the injury in the exhibition game against Ferris State.

== Regular season ==
=== Early non-conference games ===
==== Kansas ====
The Spartans traveled to Madison Square Garden to face No. 3-ranked Kansas on November 9 in the Champions Classic. The Spartans played well in the first half despite foul trouble for starting point guard Walker. AJ Hoggard played well, leading the Spartans with 17 points, but MSU struggled with turnovers. As a result, the Spartans trailed by seven at the half. Kansas was able to continue to take advantage of the 16 MSU turnovers and led by as many as 19 in the second half. The Spartans were able to narrow the lead to 10 late in the second half, but could get no closer, losing 87–74. Julius Marble scored 13 for the Spartans while Marcus Bingham Jr. led MSU with seven rebounds in the loss. The Spartans fell to 0–1 on the season.

==== Western Michigan ====
The Spartans next played Western Michigan at Breslin Center on November 12. Following a slow start where the Broncos made four of their first eight three pointers and led 15–8, MSU took control and won easily. WMU ended up making only one other three-pointer in the game, finishing five of 28. The Spartans led 46–25 at the half and dominated the game even though they too shot poorly from three, only making four of 19 shots. Gabe Brown led the Spartans with 17 points while Marcus Bingham and Joey Hauser each had 12 points. Tyson Walker had a much better game, playing 20 minutes while scoring nine points and dishing out five assists. AJ Hoggard also played well, scoring seven and leading the team with seven assists. The Spartans dominated the glass, outrebounding the Broncos by 30 in the easy 90–46 win. The win moved MSU to 1–1 on the season.

==== Butler ====
MSU returned to the road to play Butler at the historic Hinkle Fieldhouse for the Gavitt Tipoff Games on November 17. The game marked Izzo's 900th career game as head coach at MSU and his first visit to Hinkle. MSU jumped out to an early 22–8 lead, limiting Butler to only 25% from the field in the first half, and led by eight at halftime. In the second half, the Bulldogs narrowed the lead to six, but MSU responded quickly and pulled away again to win easily 73–52. The Spartans did continue to struggle with turnovers, giving up the ball 20 times in the game. However, MSU shot the ball better, shooting 46.9% from the field and 33% from three. Gabe Brown led all scorers with 19 on four of 10 shooting from three. Max Christie scored a career-high 18 and Marcus Bingham added 10 points, six blocks, and six rebounds. The Spartans again dominated the glass, outrebounding Butler 41–25. The win moved MSU to 2–1 on the season.

==== Eastern Michigan ====
The Spartans next played Eastern Michigan on November 20 in East Lansing. MSU started poorly, trailing early as Izzo stated his team was not properly prepared for the start of the game. As a result, EMU hung around early before MSU pulled away late in the first half to lead by 18 at the break. Marcus Bingham scored 19 points and added 12 rebounds for his first career double-double. Malik Hall, who started for Joey Hauser (minor calf injury), scored 15 while Gabe Brown added 10 as the Spartans pulled away for an 83–59 win. Tyson Walker had six assists and AJ Hoggard added five as MSU only turned the ball over 10 times. However, MSU had its poorest shooting effort on the season, making only 44% of their shots. The win moved MSU to 3–1 on the season.

==== Battle 4 Atlantis ====
The Spartans next traveled to The Bahamas to participate in the Battle 4 Atlantis tournament, marking MSU's second appearance in the tournament. The bracket was announced on July 28 with Michigan State to face Loyola in the quarterfinals.

===== Loyola =====
The first game of the tournament took place on November 24 as the Spartans took on former MSU graduate assistant and new Loyola coach, Drew Valentine. The Spartans started well, opening a 9–0 lead in the game, but were outscored 28–14 thereafter and trailed at the half 28–23. MSU again suffered turnover problems, turning the ball over 20 times in the game. However, they were able to lead for most of the second half as Malik Hall shot a perfect 9–9 from the floor including one three-pointer and five free throws. Hall's career-high 24 points led all scorers, but the game was tied with 16 seconds left in the second half as MSU took a timeout. On the ensuing play, Tyson Walker found Marcus Bingham wide open for an alley-oop dunk to give MSU the two-point lead with four seconds left. Loyola's last second half-court shot was no good as the Spartans held on for the 63–61 win. Bingham added 11 points, nine rebounds, and seven blocks in the game. The win moved MSU to 4–1 on the season.

===== UConn =====
In the semifinal of the tournament on November 25, MSU took on No. 22-ranked UConn on Thanksgiving Day. The Spartans again started well, taking another early lead, but were able to hold the lead this time and led by eight at the half, 32–24. Gabe Brown scored 16 for the Spartans in the game as MSU surrendered the lead and trailed by as many as seven with less than five minutes remaining in the game. However, MSU finished the game on a 9–0 run over the last 1:41 of the game to pull out the 64–60 win. Helped by a questionable late foul call on UConn, MSU only turned the ball over 12 times in the game. Malik Hall, after scoring 24 in the previous game, managed only two points, but Julius Marble scored 15 to move MSU to 5–1 on the season.

===== Baylor =====
Moving on to the championship game of the Battle 4 Atlantis and playing their third game in three days, the Spartans took on No. 6-ranked Baylor on November 26. The Spartans continued their strong play in the first half, keeping close to Baylor throughout and only trailing by two at the half, 38–36. However, the Spartans struggled in the second half, shooting only 36% from the field and missing all seven three-pointers after going 4–8 from three in the first half. As a result, the Bears were able to pull away from MSU for the 75–58 win. Jaden Akins scored a career-high 12 points in the loss while Gabe Brown led the Spartans with 13. The loss dropped MSU to 5–2 on the season.

==== Louisville ====
The newly-ranked Spartans (No. 22 in AP and Coaches Poll) returned home to face Louisville in the ACC–Big Ten Challenge on December 1. The Spartans started well, taking an early lead, but turnovers again caused problems for MSU. Louisville was able to keep the game close for most of the first half despite MSU's great defensive effort, limiting the Cardinals to 37% shooting overall and only 16% from three in the first half. In contrast, MSU shot the ball well (48% from the field and 60% from three) and was able to pull away to take a 36–28 lead at halftime. The Cardinals again narrowed the lead early in the second half as MSU turned the ball over 19 times, but the Spartan defense took over while MSU continued to shoot the ball well and pushed the lead to as many as 20. Some late substitutions allowed Louisville to pull within eight with about two minutes remaining, but the Spartans held on for the 73–64 win. MSU shot 46.9% from the field and 55.6% from three. Malik Hall again played well, scoring 15 points, including 3–3 from three, coming off the bench for the first time since the Butler game. Bingham added nine points, 12 rebounds, and three blocks. Max Christie, who had struggled in the Battle 4 Atlantis, rebounded with 11 points while Jaden Akins scored 10 points in only 10 minutes. The win moved MSU to 6–2 on the season and led Izzo to comment after the game that he was happy to start the season with this record considering who they had played.

==== Toledo ====
The Spartans next faced Toledo on December 4 at Breslin. The Spartans missed their first four shots before Gabe Brown scored the Spartans first seven points. The Spartans failed to make a three-pointer until 13:16 remained in the first half and were tied at 10. From then on, MSU took control of the game, shooting 41% from the field and 52% from three in the first half, moving the lead to as many as 26. The Rockets scored the final six points of the first half to narrow MSU's lead to 20 at half time. In the second half, Toledo, who had shot only 26% from the field in the first half, played much better. The Rockets were able to narrow MSU's lead to singled digits on multiple occasions, but MSU's defense did the job limiting Toledo to only 35% (16% from three) shooting in the game as the Spartans held on for the 81–68 win. Max Christie led the Spartans with 14 points while Gabe Brown added 12. Tyson Walker scored his most points as a Spartan, 11, and added six assists. The Spartans were able to limit their turnovers in the game to 12 as they moved to 7–2 on the season. The win also marked Izzo's 650th win at MSU.

=== Early conference games ===
==== Minnesota ====
MSU, now ranked No. 19 in the AP poll and No. 20 in the Coaches poll, began its conference schedule with two early Big Ten games, first visiting Williams Arena to face undefeated Minnesota. After being blown out by Minnesota in 2020, the Spartans controlled the game from the tip. Malik Hall and Gabe Brown each had 15 points, while Tyson Walker added a season-high 15 as well. MSU led by double figures for most of the first half and only turned the ball over five times in the half while limiting the Gophers 30% shooting (18% from three). The Spartan offense also played well in the half, making six of 11 three-pointers and leading by 13 at the half. In the second half, the Spartans pushed the lead to as many as 20, but late turnovers brought Minnesota closer. However, MSU was able to hold on for the 75–67 win. The Spartans shot 48% from the field in the game while limiting to Minnesota 39%. The win moved MSU to 8–2 on the season and 1–0 in conference play.

==== Penn State ====
The Spartans returned to home face Penn State on December 11. MSU started well, taking an early, but the Nittany Lions kept the game close until MSU was able to pull away late in the first half and led 42–29 at the half. The Spartans shot 53% from the field in the first half despite making only four of 12 three-pointers. MSU was able to limit Penn State to no three-pointers in the half despite shooting 43% from the field. In the second half, MSU pushed the lead to as many as 19, but the Lions were able to prevent a bigger lead. However, they could not cut the lead to single digits as the Spartans pulled away. Marcus Bingham had his second double-double of the season with a career-high 13 rebounds and 12 points while Brown scored 15 to lead the Spartans. MSU scored 31 fast break points while PSU only scored three. MSU shot much better from three in the second half, hitting five of nine shots to shoot 42% for the game as they won easily 80–64. Tyson Walker scored 10 points for MSU and added nine assists as he continued his strong play. The win moved MSU to 9–2 on the season and 2–0 in conference play.

=== Remaining non-conference games ===
==== Oakland ====
After playing 11 games in 33 days, the Spartans had a 10-day break before taking on Oakland on December 21 at Little Caesars Arena in Detroit. MSU, now ranked No. 11 in the country, shot the ball well, shooting over 55% from the field and 39% from three. Max Christie appeared to shake off his recent shooting slump, making 75% of his shots including four of six three-pointers. Tyson Walker notched his first double-double, scoring 10 points and dishing out 10 assists. Walker only turned the ball over once as well and AJ Hoggard also played well, with seven assists and one turnover. Christie and Marcus Bingham each scored 17 for the Spartans while Gabe Brown added 14 and Malik Hall scored 13. Bingham added 12 rebounds. Oakland was able to keep the game close throughout, but never really threatened as the Spartans won 90–78. The win moved MSU to 10–2 on the season.

==== High Point ====
The Spartans had another break, this time for eight days, before playing High Point on December 29. The day before the game, Izzo announced that four players, including starters Marcus Bingham and Max Christie, would not be available for the game after testing positive for COVID-19. MSU, newly ranked No. 10 in both polls, started slowly in the game, missing their first eight shots and trailed by one at the half. In the second half, the Spartans were finally able to pull away as Gabe Brown scored a career-high 24 points while Joey Hauser notched a double-double with 17 points and 11 rebounds. Aj Hoggard added eight assists as the Spartans missed Christie and Bingham defensively, allowing the Panthers to shoot 46% from the field including 52% from three. Meanwhile, MSU shot 50% from three and 47% from the field. The Spartans, with only 10 available players, pulled out the win 81–68. The win moved the Spartans to 11–2 on the season.

=== Remaining conference games ===
==== Northwestern ====
The Spartans traveled to face Northwestern on January 2, 2022. Max Christie and Marcus Bingham both returned to the lineup, but the Spartans struggled in the first half, trailing by as many as 13. MSU struggled from the field, making only one of 10 three-pointers, but were able to narrow the lead to seven at the half. In the second half, MSU took the lead behind Gabe Brown's 20 points. Northwestern did not go away however as the game turned into a free throw shooting contest with 36 fouls and 51 free throws attempted by the two teams in the second half. Tyson Walker fouled out for MSU and struggled, failing to score. Bingham added 13 while Christie added 11 as the game was still in doubt until Brown hit a three-pointer with less than a minute remaining to extend the lead to five as the Spartans held on for the road win, 73–67. The win moved MSU to 12–2 on the season and 3–0 in conference play.

==== Nebraska ====
MSU welcomed Nebraska to Breslin on January 5. Turnovers were again a major concern for the Spartans as they committed 10 in the first 11 minutes of the game. Nebraska also started well, making their first six baskets and shooting 47% from the field in the first half. However, MSU countered their turnover issues in the half by shooting 54% from the field in the half including making three of eight three-point attempts. MSU was able to cut down on the turnovers later in the game, committing 19 in the game. MSU led 38–34 at the half. The Spartans were led by Gabe Brown offensively and defensively in the game, Izzo said it was perhaps his best defensive effort in a Spartan uniform, as he grabbed four rebounds and four steals. Brown added two blocks and 14 points while Max Christie scored a career-high 21, shooting seven of nine from the field and making all four of his free throws. The Spartans were able to pull away late, limiting the Cornhuskers to 41% from the field in the second half. MSU held on for the 79–67 win to move to 13–2 on the season and 4–0 in conference play.

==== Michigan ====
The Spartans returned to the road to face their rival Michigan on January 8. However, less than eight hours before the game was scheduled to tip and after MSU had already traveled to Ann Arbor, Michigan announced it had more positive COVID-19 tests within its program and that it was unable to play the game. As a result, the game was postponed.

==== Minnesota ====
Following the postponement of the game against Michigan, the Spartans welcomed Minnesota to Breslin on January 12. MSU started well, building a 10-point lead in the first half behind four of eight three-point shooting and 46% from the field in the half. However, the Spartans failed to score for the final 2:38 of the half and Minnesota was able to narrow the lead to three at the half. In the second half, Minnesota refused to go away. Both Tyson Walker and Marcus Bingham did not play for the final 10-plus minutes as MSU went with a lineup of AJ Hoggard, Max Christie, Gabe Brown, Malik Hall, and Joey Hauser. With MSU leading by five with 2:21 left in the game, the Gophers scored the next five points to tie the game at 69 with 25 seconds remaining. After calling a timeout, the Spartans were unable to get the ball to Brown and Hoggard improvised by going to the basket and slipping the ball to Hauser who scored with 0.1 seconds left on the clock to give the Spartans the 71–69 win. Christie led the Spartans with 16 points while Brown added 13. Walker added 10 points in only 17 minutes in the win. MSU moved to 14–2 on the season and remained undefeated in conference play at 5–0.

==== Northwestern ====
On January 15, Northwestern came to Breslin for a rematch of their earlier game. The Spartans struggled mightily in the game and trailed late as Northwestern, without their best player, Pete Nance Jr., led by two with less than 10 seconds remaining. A traveling call after rebounding a missed Hall three-pointer that would have given the Spartans the lead, gave the ball to MSU with 0.9 seconds left. An attempted lob by Joey Hauser to Marcus Bingham resulted in a Northwestern foul that sent Bingham to the line with a chance to tie the game. However, he missed the first free throw and Northwestern secured the rebound to hold on for the 64–62 win. The loss was the first for the Spartans in Big Ten play and dropped them to 5–1 and 14–3 on the season.

==== Wisconsin ====
After five days off, the Spartans, having slipped to No. 14 in the AP poll, traveled to face No. 8-ranked Wisconsin on January 21. MSU quickly fell behind 8–0 to the Badgers at Kohl Center. However, MSU recovered quickly to outscore Wisconsin 42–18 for the remainder of the first half as they outshot Wisconsin, shooting 58% from the floor and limited the Badgers to 27%. MSU entered the second half with a 16-point lead, but Wisconsin would not go away, drawing within six points on two occasions, but MSU was able to respond each time to push the lead back to double figures. Malik Hall led the Spartans with 14 points while four other Spartans scored in double figures. AJ Hoggard scored 12 and added eight assists with only one turnover and hit eight of his 10 free throw attempts as MSU held on for the 86–74 win. The Spartans shot 50% from three and 52% overall in the win. The win moved MSU to 15–3 on the season and left them as the sole remaining one-loss team in the Big Ten at 6–1.

==== Illinois ====
MSU, now ranked No. 10 in the AP poll, stayed on the road to face No. 24-ranked Illinois, who were without two of their best players, Kofi Cockburn and André Curbelo, on January 25. Despite the Illini being short-handed and MSU's excellent offensive performance in the previous game, MSU shot poorly from the floor. In the first half, MSU made only eight field goals and shot under 30% from the field including one of five from three. As a result, they trailed by 14 at the break and managed only 20 points in the first half. The Spartan offense improved in the second half, but still struggled, managing only 11 baskets and under 40% from the field. They trailed by as many 16 in the half, but narrowed the lead in the final minutes. Illinois did not score for the final 5:32 of the game while MSU had the ball with six seconds remaining, trailing by two. For the second time in three games, the Spartan opponent committed a foul with less than a second left in the game and Malik Hall went to the line with a chance to tie. However, he missed the first free throw and made the second before time ran out as the Spartans lost 56–55. Marcus Bingham Jr. led the Spartans with 13 points, but only one other Spartan, Gabe Brown, scored as many as 10 in the loss. The loss dropped MSU out of first place in the Big Ten and down to 6–2 in the conference and 15–4 overall.

==== Michigan ====
The Spartans returned home to face Michigan on January 29. MSU played well and outshot Michigan in the first half 51% to 36%. But due in part to Michigan outrebounding the Spartans, MSU only led by four at the break. An early run in the second half by the Spartans extended the lead to as many as 20 as MSU dominated the game. Michigan was limited to only 37% from the field and 18% from three while MSU shot 55% from the field and 50% from three. Max Christie scored 14 of his team-high 16 points in the first half while Joey Hauser added 14 and Malik Hall scored 15. AJ Hoggard notched his first career double-double, 11 points and 10 assists, as MSU won easily 83–67. Football player walk-ons Maliq Carr and Keon Coleman saw action at the end of the game with Coleman scoring a basket in the win. This led the student section to chant, "just like football," referencing the football team's win over Michigan in October. Coleman became the first player to score a touchdown and a basket for AP top ten teams in both football and basketball since 1992 when Florida State's Charlie Ward quarterback/guard did so. Izzo was extremely pleased with his team's effort as the Spartans moved to 16–4 and 7–2 on the season.

==== Maryland ====
The Spartans, ranked No. 13 in the country, returned to the road to face Maryland on February 1. MSU played fairly well in the first half against the Terrapins, limiting their turnovers and pulling away for a 10-point lead at the break. As the second half began, the Spartans extended the lead to 15 points and the rout appeared to be on for MSU. However, the Spartan offense began to struggle and the Terrapins climbed back in to the game, narrowing the lead to single digits several times. With 6:30 remaining in the game, Maryland had narrowed the lead to three and the Spartans went scoreless for the next three minutes. Maryland was finally able to tie the game at 61 with 2:49 left. Following free throws by Malik Hall, Maryland again tied the game, this time at 63 with 2:20 remaining. With 24 seconds left, Tyson Walker forced a turnover, giving MSU the ball with a chance to win the game. After a timeout, with 11 seconds remaining, Hall got the ball from Tyson Walker and made a tough layup with 1.9 seconds remaining to give MSU the 65–63 lead. Maryland's desperation three from half court was no good as MSU pulled out the tight two-point win. The Spartans again moved into a tie for first place in the Big Ten with an 8–2 record while moving to 17–4 on the season.

==== Rutgers ====
MSU stayed on the road to face Rutgers on February 5 at Jersey Mike's Arena. Rutgers started well, shooting over 60% from the field and leading throughout the first half. However, the Spartans stayed close behind Gabe Brown's hot shooting. Brown, who scored 20 points for the Spartans on six of seven shooting from three, led MSU and kept the game within two points at the half. However, Rutgers continued its hot shooting in the second half and the Spartans could not keep up as they were blown out 84–63. The Scarlet Knights shot 61% from the field in the game and dominated the paint, outscoring MSU 38–16 inside the lane. Rutgers also outrebounded MSU 31–20 in the easy win for the Knights. Izzo described the game "as an old-fashioned butt-kicking." The loss dropped MSU into fourth place in the conference at 8–3 and 17–5 overall.

==== Wisconsin ====
On February 8, the now 17th-ranked Spartans returned home to face a Wisconsin team, now ranked No. 14 in the country, they had beaten easily less than two weeks prior. MSU continued its streak of poor starts, falling behind early to the Badgers and trailing throughout the game. MSU only made eight of 25 shots and failed to make a three point basket in the first half. Despite their poor play, they were able to keep the game close, trailing by six at the half, 29–23. In the second half, the Badges pushed the lead to as many as 10, but MSU began to hit shots and cut the Wisconsin lead to within a possession on several occasions, but could not draw any closer. MSU shot much better in the half, hitting 50% of their shots and making three three-pointers, but it was not enough as they lost 70–62. Malik Hall scored 12 points on only seven shots, but still only played 23 minutes in the game. Marcus Bingham led the Spartans with 15 points in 20 minutes, but the point guard play was poor, with Tyson Walker and AJ Hoggard combining for only eight points and turning the ball over five times. Izzo blamed himself for not having his team prepared. The loss dropped the Spartans to 8–4 in league play and 17–6 overall.

==== Indiana ====
MSU next played Indiana at home on February 12. The Spartans started the game well, shooting over 40% from the field, but the Hoosiers attempted 13 more shots in the half, keeping the game close. MSU kept the lead by making 16 of 18 free throws in the half and led by seven at the break. In the second half, the Spartans again shot over 40% from the field and made nine of 10 free throws. Malik Hall led the Spartans with 18 points, including a shot from behind the backboard, as the Spartans led by as many as 18 in the half. Both point guards played well for the Spartans as Tyson Walker scored 15 while AJ Hoggard added 14 points and eight assists. Hoggard was ejected in the game for two technical fouls, but it didn't matter as MSU held on for the 76–61 win. Izzo said the game wasn't pretty, but his team was gritty in the win. The win kept MSU a game and a half behind league-leading Illinois at 9–4 and 18–6 overall.

==== Penn State ====
After slipping to No. 19 in the AP poll, the Spartans returned to the road to face Penn State on February 15. The Spartans shot the ball well in the first half and limited the Nittany Lions to 27% shooting in the first half, but due in part to seven offensive rebounds by PSU, the game was tied at 24 at the half. In the prior game between the two teams, MSU had scored more than 30 fast break points, but Penn State limited the Spartans to only three in the rematch. Despite that, the Spartans surged to a 14-point lead early in the second half and looked to have the game under control with just over 13 minutes left in the game. However, the Spartans scored only 15 points in the final 13 minutes. Penn State slowly cut into the lead and took the lead with 1:37 left on the game. A turnover led to an offensive rebound and three-point play by PSU big man John Harrar with 35 seconds left put the Penn State lead at four. The Lions made their free throws at the end to hold on for the 62–58 win. The loss likely signaled the end of the Spartans' hopes to challenge for a Big Ten championship as they fell to 18–7, 9–5 on the season. After the game, Izzo did not make any players available to the media for the first time any media member could remember.

==== Illinois ====
Illinois visited Breslin on February 19. The Illini led throughout, pushing the lead to as many as 16 several times in the second half. MSU played well defensively in the first half, limiting Illinois to under 38% from the field, but Illinois did make five three-pointers in the half and took a 12-point lead to halftime. In the first half, the Spartan offense struggled mightily, shooting only 31% from the field. In the second half, MSU shot the ball much better from the field, shooting over 60% and making six three-pointers. However, behind Kofi Cockburn's 27 points and Jacob Grandison's 24 points, Illinois controlled the game and led by 16 with less than nine minutes remaining. Gabe Brown, Max Christie, and Malik Hall struggled in the game, combining for only eight points. As a result, MSU went with Tyson Walker and AJ Hoggard on the floor at the same time for long periods of time. Walker responded by scoring a season-high 26 points, making 10 of 12 shots including all three three-pointers he attempted. Walker took over in the final five minutes of the game and brought MSU to within two on several occasions. Trailing by two following a three-point play by Walker, Illini guard Trent Frasier hit a long three-pointer with 23 seconds left to give the Illinois a five-point lead and the eventual win 79–74. The loss dropped MSU to 18–8 and 9–6 on the season.

==== Iowa ====
After dropping out of the rankings of the AP poll, the Spartans traveled to Carver–Hawkeye Arena to face No. 25-ranked Iowa on February 22. MSU trailed from the outset as the Hawkeyes routed the Spartans, leading by as many as 30 in the second half and winning by 26. Gabe Brown continued to struggle for the MSU, failing to score and missing all seven of his shots from the field. Max Christie also continued to struggle, making only two of his 11 and shots and play a season-low 24 minutes. Malik Hall led the Spartans with 17 points, but no other MSU player scored in double figures. Izzo vowed to make changes after the game and stated that the team would not give up on the season. The loss was MSU's fifth loss in the previous six games and seventh loss in the prior 11 games. MSU dropped to 18–9 and 9–7 on the season.

==== Purdue ====
The Spartans returned home to face No. 4-ranked Purdue on February 26. MSU started well, taking an early lead and led for most of the first half. MSU changed up its starting lineup, inserting Julies Marble II and Malik Hall into the lineup. The Spartan defense chose not to double team 7'4" Purdue center Zach Edey in order to limit the Boilermakers' three-point shooting. As a result, Edey scored 25 points in the game, but Purdue only made one three-pointer. MSU led by as many as seven in the first half and led at the half 35–33. MSU was outshot (PU 52.1%, MSU 47.4%), outrebounded (PU 34, MSU 24), and lost the free throw battle (PU 14–19, MSU 5–10). However, the Spartans still played well, leading throughout most of the second half as well. With an 11-point lead and 9:36 remaining, Purdue countered to tie the game with 51 seconds remaining. Marble made two free throws to give MSU a two-point lead, but Trevion Williams tied the game again with 30 seconds remaining. Following an MSU timeout, the Spartans put the ball in Tyson Walker's hands and, following a screen that left Williams on Walker, Walker hit a three-pointer with 1.1 seconds remaining to give the Spartans the 68–65 win. Gabe Brown played well for the Spartans, leading MSU with 13 points while Marble added 12. Max Christie and AJ Hoggard each had 11 while Walker scored eight. The win marked Izzo's 662nd win as coach as MSU, tying him with Bob Knight for the most wins by a men's basketball coach at a Big Ten school. The win moved MSU to 19–9 and 10–7 on the season.

==== Michigan ====
The Spartans traveled to face rival Michigan on March 1 in a makeup game of the prior scheduled game that was postponed to COVID-19 protocols at Michigan. Michigan outplayed MSU from the start, shooting over 60% from the field in the first half while making five three-pointers. UM big man Hunter Dickinson torched MSU's interior defense and scored a career-high 33 points as the Wolverines took the early lead and never relinquished it. The Spartans trailed by as many as 20 in the game. Spartan guard AJ Hoggard was limited in the game due to a "non-COVID illness" and played only 11 minutes. MSU was no match in the game as they continued to be inconsistent on the season, getting blown out 87–70. Izzo was disappointed in his team and called out his juniors and seniors for lacking leadership. The loss dropped MSU to 19–10, 10–8 on the season with two games remaining. In the game, Marcus Bingham Jr. set the record for career blocks at MSU, passing former teammate Xavier Tillman.

==== Ohio State ====
Two days later, the Spartans traveled to face No. 23 Ohio State in Columbus for their final road game of the season. Once again, MSU started slow, falling behind 13–0 in the first three minutes. The Spartans were able to narrow the lead to two points with 8:48 left in the half and looked to make the game close. However, the Buckeyes responded with a 9–0 run to put the game out of reach. MSU's defense struggled again, allowing OSU to make 54% of their shots including eight of 13 three-pointers in the first half. OSU, without two key players, dominated MSU from the inside. MSU shot the ball well from three in the game, making nine of 18 threes, but could not narrow the lead to single digits as they lost their fifth game in the prior six and dropped to 19–11 and 10–9 on the season. Izzo expressed he was angry with his team's performance and commented that they looked like a poorly-coached team.

==== Maryland ====
Following their game at Ohio State, MSU returned home for the season finale against Maryland on March 6. MSU started well, scoring the first 14 points of the game leading 18–1 with 12 minutes remaining in the first half. The Spartans led by as many as 22 points in the first half and led by 20 at halftime. Maryland shot 28% from the field in the first half and made only one thee while MSU shot over 53% from the field in the half. The Terrapins started the second half on a 10–0 run to narrow the lead to 10. MSU responded, but Maryland stayed close, pulling within three seven minutes left in the game. The Spartans steadied their play, led by Malik Halls 17 points and Marcus Bingham's 11 rebounds to hold on for the 77–67 win. The win marked Izzo's 663rd win as coach of the Spartans, the most by a men's basketball coach at a Big Ten school. The win marked MSU's 20th on the season, the 21st time under Izzo the Spartans had won at least 20 games. The win ended the regular season with the Spartans 20–11, 11–9 in Big Ten play.

== Postseason ==
=== Big Ten tournament ===
The Big Ten tournament took place at Gainbridge Fieldhouse in Indianapolis from March 9 through March 13. MSU finished the season in a tie for seventh place with rival Michigan, but were the No. 7 seed in the Big Ten tournament.

==== Maryland ====
The Spartans faced Maryland for the second consecutive game in the second round of the Big Ten tournament on March 10. The game proceeded as the prior two meetings between the teams did with MSU playing well from the outset and leading by nine at half. In the second half, as they did in the second meeting, MSU pushed the lead to as many as 20 points and looked to have an easy win. However, the Spartans began to turn the ball over and quickly surrendered the large lead. Maryland began to press the Spartans and MSU turned the ball over six times in their final 11 possessions. The Terrapins narrowed the lead to two with just over a minute remaining in the game. A basket by Tyson Walker moved the lead to four and Max Christie hit two free throws to extend the lead to six with 31 second left. Maryland drew within four on their next possession and forced an MSU turnover. A Maryland basket with 16 seconds left moved the lead at two. On the ensuing inbound play, MSU turned the ball over and Maryland had the ball with a chance to tie or win. However, Maryland guard Fatts Russell missed a three-pointer to take the lead with six seconds remaining and Christie made two free throws to put the game out of reach as the Spartans held on for the 76–72 win. The win moved MSU to 21–11 on the season.

==== Wisconsin ====
MSU faced Wisconsin on March 11 in the quarterfinals of the Big Ten tournament. After splitting the season series against the Badgers in the regular season, offense was at a premium in the first half as both teams shot under 35% from the field and neither made a three-pointer. MSU held the lead at the half 24–22. As the offenses played better in the second half, MSU only made one three-pointer, but Marcus Bingham Jr. and Tyson Walker hit big shots down the stretch for the Spartans as MSU held Wisconsin star Johnny Davis to only 11 points in the game. Bingham scored 19 and added 11 rebounds while Walker scored 11 with seven assists. MSU only made one three-pointer in the game, but held on for the six-point win. The win moved MSU to 22–11 on the season.

==== Purdue ====
In the semifinals of the Big Ten tournament on March 12, the Spartans faced No. 3-seeded Purdue. Both offenses struggled again in the first half, again both shooting under 35% from the field. Despite this, MSU trailed by seven at the half, 27–20. In the second half, both offenses again shot the ball better. Tyson Walker, who left the game with an injured ankle early in the first half, did not play in the second half. Purdue led by as many as 11 in the second half, but MSU managed to stay in the game, narrowing the lead to one with over five minute remaining. However, the Boilermakers hit some big shots down the stretch to hold on for the 75–70 win. A.J. Hoggard, who played all 20 minutes in the second half without Walker, scored 17 points and added 10 assists in the loss while Gabe Brown contributed 16 points. The loss dropped MSU to 22–12 on the season as they waited to see where they would play in the NCAA tournament.

=== NCAA Tournament ===
MSU received an at-large bid to the NCAA Tournament as the No. 7 seed in the West region.

==== Davidson ====
The Spartans faced Davidson and former guard Foster Loyer in the first round of the NCAA tournament on March 18. Loyer played three years at MSU before transferring prior to the season. The game remained close throughout the first half as both teams shot over 40% from the field. Joey Hauser had his best game of the season, making four of six three-pointers and nine of 12 overall while scoring a season-high 27 points for the Spartans. However, Davidson kept it close until MSU was able to push the lead to eight with less than a minute remaining. The Wildcats hit a flurry of three-pointers in the final seconds to draw within one with less than one second remaining. But, MSU was able to hold on for the 74–73 win. Hauser added eight rebounds to his 27 points while AJ Hoggard scored 13 and Gabe Brown added 12. Marcus Bingham added eight rebounds in the win, moving MSU to the Second Round of the Tournament. The win moved MSU to 23–12 on the season.

==== Duke ====
The Spartans next faced Duke, whose head coach Mike Krzyzewski was in his final season coaching the Blue Devils. MSU started well behind Gabe Brown's 18 points and kept within a few possessions of the Blue Devils throughout the first half. The Spartans did so by hitting seven of 10 three-pointers in the half and trailed by four at the break. In the second half, the Spartans again kept it close, but only made four of 12 three-pointers. However, following free throws by Marcus Bingham with 5:10 remaining, the Spartans moved to a 70–65 lead. Duke responded, finishing the game on a 20–6 run to pull out the nine-point victory 85–76. Bingham, in his last game as a Spartan, scored 16 and added 10 rebounds. The loss ended MSU's season with a record of 23–13.

== Roster ==
On September 28, 2021, Izzo announced that Gabe Brown and Malik Hall had been selected captains. Izzo said they were near-unanimous selections as the team's captains.

At the MSU media day on October 20, Izzo announced that walk-on Davis Smith, son of former Spartan player Steve Smith, was given a scholarship. Izzo said that he had not been given the scholarship because of who his father was; that he had earned it.

In early October, Izzo stated that he was still open to Maliq Carr and Keon Coleman, both on the MSU football team, to joining the team. However, he encouraged them to help "take care of football business" prior to doing so. In January 2022, Izzo stated that it was still uncertain whether Coleman and Carr would join the team following the football season's end. He stated that he and football coach Mel Tucker would make the decision together. Both Carr and Coleman suited up and were available for the game against Northwestern on January 15.

2021–22 Michigan State Spartans men's basketball team
Players
Coaches

Pos.	#	Name	Height	Weight	Year	Previous school	Hometown
G	3	Jaden Akins	6 ft 4 in (1.93 m)	180 lb (82 kg)	Fr	Sunrise Christian Academy	Farmington, MI
F	30	Marcus Bingham Jr.	7 ft 0 in (2.13 m)	230 lb (104 kg)	Sr	Catholic Central HS	Grand Rapids, MI
G	1	Pierre Brooks	6 ft 6 in (1.98 m)	225 lb (102 kg)	Fr	Douglass Academy	Detroit, MI
F	44	Gabe Brown (C)	6 ft 8 in (2.03 m)	215 lb (98 kg)	Sr	Belleville HS	Ypsilanti, MI
F	15	Maliq Carr (W)	6 ft 5 in (1.96 m)	230 lb (104 kg)	RS Fr	Purdue; Oak Park HS	Oak Park, MI
G	5	Max Christie	6 ft 6 in (1.98 m)	190 lb (86 kg)	Fr	Rolling Meadows HS	Arlington Heights, IL
G	40	Keon Coleman (W)	6 ft 4 in (1.93 m)	200 lb (91 kg)	Fr	Opelousas Catholic School	Opelousas, LA
F	25	Malik Hall (C)	6 ft 8 in (2.03 m)	225 lb (102 kg)	Jr	Sunrise Christian Academy	Aurora, IL
F	10	Joey Hauser	6 ft 9 in (2.06 m)	230 lb (104 kg)	RS Sr	Marquette; Stevens Point HS	Stevens Point, WI
G	11	A. J. Hoggard	6 ft 4 in (1.93 m)	210 lb (95 kg)	So	Huntington Prep	Coatesville, PA
G	13	Steven Izzo (W)	5 ft 8 in (1.73 m)	150 lb (68 kg)	Jr	Lansing Catholic	East Lansing, MI
F	34	Julius Marble II	6 ft 9 in (2.06 m)	245 lb (111 kg)	Jr	Jesuit HS	Dallas, TX
F	35	Peter Nwoke (W)	6 ft 7 in (2.01 m)	215 lb (98 kg)	Fr	Orchard Lake St. Mary's	Lagos, Nigeria
G	20	Michael Peterson (W)	6 ft 7 in (2.01 m)	205 lb (93 kg)	GS	Ferris State; Rockford HS	Rockford, MI
C	22	Mady Sissoko	6 ft 9 in (2.06 m)	235 lb (107 kg)	So	Wasatch Academy	Bafoulabé, Mali
G	14	Davis Smith	6 ft 0 in (1.83 m)	160 lb (73 kg)	So	Westminster	Atlanta, GA
G	2	Tyson Walker	6 ft 0 in (1.83 m)	175 lb (79 kg)	Jr	Northeastern; Christ the King Prep	Westbury, NY
G	43	Jason Whitens (injured) (W)	6 ft 5 in (1.96 m)	210 lb (95 kg)	RS Sr	Western Michigan; North Central HS	Powers, MI

Head coach

- Tom Izzo (Northern Michigan)

Assistant coach(es)

- Dwayne Stephens (Michigan State)
- Mark Montgomery (Michigan State)
- Doug Wojcik (Navy)

Legend

- (C) Team captain
- (S) Suspended
- (I) Ineligible
- (W) Walk-on
- Injured
- Current redshirt

Roster

== Schedule and results ==
On September 8, 2021, the Big Ten announced the conference schedule.

Date time, TV	Rank^{#}	Opponent^{#}	Result	Record	High points	High rebounds	High assists	Site (attendance) city, state
Exhibition
October 27, 2021*; 7:00 p.m., BTN+		Ferris State	W 92–58		19 – Brown	6 – Hauser	5 – Walker	Breslin Center (14,797); East Lansing, MI
November 4, 2021*; 7:00 p.m., BTN+		Grand Valley State	W 83–60		14 – Christie	9 – Hauser	6 – Walker	Breslin Center (14,797); East Lansing, MI
Regular season
November 9, 2021*; 7:00 p.m., ESPN		vs. No. 3 Kansas; Champions Classic	L 74–87	0–1	17 – Hoggard	7 – Tied	4 – Hoggard	Madison Square Garden (18,132); New York, NY
November 12, 2021*; 6:30 p.m., BTN		Western Michigan	W 90–46	1–1	17 – Brown	12 – Hauser	7 – Hoggard	Breslin Center (14,797); East Lansing, MI
November 17, 2021*; 7:00 p.m., FS1		at Butler; Gavitt Tipoff Games	W 73–52	2–1	19 – Brown	6 – 3 Tied	5 – Walker	Hinkle Fieldhouse (9,100); Indianapolis, IN
November 20, 2021*; 5:00 p.m., BTN+		Eastern Michigan	W 83–59	3–1	19 – Bingham Jr.	12 – Bingham Jr.	6 – Walker	Breslin Center (14,797); East Lansing, MI
November 24, 2021*; 12:00 p.m., ESPN		vs. Loyola–Chicago; Battle 4 Atlantis quarterfinal	W 63–61	4–1	24 – Hall	9 – Bingham Jr.	4 – Walker	Imperial Arena (1,104); Nassau, Bahamas
November 25, 2021*; 12:00 p.m., ESPN		vs. No. 22 UConn; Battle 4 Atlantis semifinal	W 64–60	5–1	16 – Brown	10 – Brown	5 – Hoggard	Imperial Arena (1,173); Nassau, Bahamas
November 26, 2021*; 11:00 a.m., ESPN		vs. No. 6 Baylor; Battle 4 Atlantis championship	L 58–75	5–2	13 – Brown	5 – Brown	2 – 3 Tied	Imperial Arena (1,305); Nassau, Bahamas
December 1, 2021*; 7:15 p.m., ESPN	No. 22	Louisville; ACC–Big Ten Challenge	W 73–64	6–2	15 – Hall	12 – Bingham Jr.	10 – Walker	Breslin Center (14,797); East Lansing, MI
December 4, 2021*; 5:00 p.m., BTN	No. 22	Toledo	W 81–68	7–2	14 – Christie	7 – Akins	6 – Walker	Breslin Center (14,797); East Lansing, MI
December 8, 2021; 9:00 p.m., BTN	No. 19	at Minnesota	W 75–67	8–2 (1–0)	15 – 3 Tied	9 – Hall	4 – Hall	Williams Arena (11,178); Minneapolis, MN
December 11, 2021; 2:00 p.m., BTN	No. 19	Penn State	W 80–64	9–2 (2–0)	15 – Brown	13 – Bingham Jr.	9 – Walker	Breslin Center (14,797); East Lansing, MI
December 21, 2021*; 7:30 p.m., ESPN+	No. 11	vs. Oakland; Detroit Showcase	W 90–78	10–2	17 – Tied	12 – Bingham Jr.	10 – Walker	Little Caesars Arena (16,837); Detroit, MI
December 29, 2021*; 3:00 p.m., BTN	No. 10	High Point	W 81–68	11–2	24 – Brown	11 – Hauser	8 – Hoggard	Breslin Center (14,797); East Lansing, MI
January 2, 2022; 2:00 p.m., BTN	No. 10	at Northwestern	W 73–67	12–2 (3–0)	20 – Brown	9 – Tied	4 – Walker	Welsh–Ryan Arena (4,716); Evanston, IL
January 5, 2022; 7:00 p.m., BTN	No. 10	Nebraska	W 79–67	13–2 (4–0)	21 – Christie	8 – Hauser	5 – Tied	Breslin Center (14,797); East Lansing, MI
January 12, 2022; 7:00 p.m., BTN	No. 10	Minnesota	W 71–69	14–2 (5–0)	16 – Christie	7 – Hall	6 – Hoggard	Breslin Center (14,797); East Lansing, MI
January 15, 2022; 12:00 p.m., BTN	No. 10	Northwestern	L 62–64	14–3 (5–1)	18 – Marble II	9 – Brown	8 – Walker	Breslin Center (14,797); East Lansing, MI
January 21, 2022; 9:00 p.m., FS1	No. 14	at No. 8 Wisconsin	W 86–74	15–3 (6–1)	15 – Hall	11 – Hauser	8 – Hoggard	Kohl Center (17,287); Madison, WI
January 25, 2022; 7:00 p.m., ESPN	No. 10	at No. 24 Illinois	L 55–56	15–4 (6–2)	13 – Bingham Jr.	7 – Hauser	6 – Walker	State Farm Center (15,544); Champaign, IL
January 29, 2022; 12:30 p.m., CBS	No. 10	Michigan; Rivalry	W 83–67	16–4 (7–2)	16 – Christie	8 – Bingham Jr.	10 – Hoggard	Breslin Center (14,797); East Lansing, MI
February 1, 2022; 7:00 p.m., ESPN2	No. 13	at Maryland	W 65–63	17–4 (8–2)	16 – Hall	6 – Bingham Jr.	3 – Hoggard	Xfinity Center (14,331); College Park, MD
February 5, 2022; 4:00 p.m, FS1	No. 13	at Rutgers	L 63–84	17–5 (8–3)	20 – Brown	5 – Brown	5 – Hoggard	Jersey Mike's Arena (8,117); Piscataway, NJ
February 8, 2022; 7:00 p.m., BTN	No. 17	No. 14 Wisconsin	L 62–70	17–6 (8–4)	15 – Bingham Jr.	8 – Hauser	7 – Hoggard	Breslin Center (14,797); East Lansing, MI
February 12, 2022; 3:30 p.m., FOX	No. 17	Indiana	W 76–61	18–6 (9–4)	18 – Hall	9 – Marble II	8 – Hoggard	Breslin Center (14,797); East Lansing, MI
February 15, 2022; 6:30 p.m., BTN	No. 19	at Penn State	L 58–62	18–7 (9–5)	14 – Marble II	8 – Marble II	5 – Hoggard	Bryce Jordan Center (8,390); University Park, PA
February 19, 2022; 12:00 p.m., ESPN	No. 19	No. 12 Illinois	L 74–79	18–8 (9–6)	26 – Walker	10 – Marble II	8 – Hoggard	Breslin Center (14,797); East Lansing, MI
February 22, 2022; 7:00 p.m., ESPN		at No. 25 Iowa	L 60–86	18–9 (9–7)	17 – Hall	8 – Marble II	6 – Hoggard	Carver–Hawkeye Arena (14,634); Iowa City, IA
February 26, 2022; 12:00 p.m., ESPN		No. 4 Purdue	W 68–65	19–9 (10–7)	13 – Brown	3 – 6 Tied	6 – Hoggard	Breslin Center (14,797); East Lansing, MI
March 1, 2022; 8:30 p.m., FS1		at Michigan; Rivalry/Rescheduled from January 8	L 70–87	19–10 (10–8)	12 – Brown	4 – Tied	4 – Walker	Crisler Center (11,721); Ann Arbor, MI
March 3, 2022; 7:00 p.m., ESPN		at No. 23 Ohio State	L 69–80	19–11 (10–9)	13 – Brown	5 – Bingham Jr.	8 – Walker	Value City Arena (14,951); Columbus, OH
March 6, 2022; 4:30 p.m., CBS		Maryland	W 77–67	20–11 (11–9)	17 – Hall	11 – Bingham Jr.	5 – Walker	Breslin Center (14,797); East Lansing, MI
Big Ten tournament
March 10, 2022; 6:30 p.m., BTN	(7)	vs. (10) Maryland; Second Round	W 76–72	21–11	16 – Christie	6 – 3 Tied	6 – Hoggard	Gainbridge Fieldhouse (14,331); Indianapolis, IN
March 11, 2022; 6:30 p.m., BTN	(7)	vs. (2) No. 12 Wisconsin; Quarterfinals	W 69–63	22–11	19 – Bingham Jr.	11 – Bingham Jr.	7 – Walker	Gainbridge Fieldhouse (16,415); Indianapolis, IN
March 12, 2022; 3:30 p.m., CBS	(7)	vs. (3) No. 9 Purdue; Semifinals	L 70–75	22–12	17 – Hoggard	6 – Christie	10 – Hoggard	Gainbridge Fieldhouse (17,762); Indianapolis, IN
NCAA tournament
March 18, 2022; 9:40 p.m., CBS	(7 W)	vs. (10 W) Davidson; First Round	W 74–73	23–12	27 – Hauser	8 – Tied	3 – Brown	Bon Secours Wellness Arena (14,295); Greenville, SC
March 20, 2022; 5:15 pm, CBS	(7 W)	vs. (2 W) No. 9 Duke; Second Round	L 76–85	23–13	18 – Brown	10 – Bingham Jr.	5 – Walker	Bon Secours Wellness Arena (14,316); Greenville, SC
*Non-conference game. ^{#}Rankings from AP Poll. (#) Tournament seedings in parentheses. W=West Source. All times are in Eastern Time.

== Player statistics ==
Individual player statistics (Final)
			Minutes		Scoring		Total FGs			3-point FGs			Free-Throws			Rebounds							
Player	GP	GS	Tot	Avg	Pts	Avg	FG	FGA	Pct	3FG	3FA	Pct	FT	FTA	Pct	Off	Def	Tot	Avg	A	Stl	Blk	TO
Akins, Jaden	36	1	532	14.8	122	3.4	43	109	.394	19	50	.380	17	28	.607	23	62	85	2.4	25	22	9	24
Bingham, Jr., Marcus	35	32	655	18.7	325	9.3	126	236	.534	17	41	.415	56	75	.747	59	160	219	6.3	9	32	77	42
Brooks, Pierre	25	0	93	3.7	23	0.9	6	20	.300	2	11	.182	9	13	.692	3	9	12	0.5	4	0	0	7
Brown, Gabe	36	36	1039	28.9	418	11.6	143	334	.428	73	191	.382	59	66	.894	32	105	137	3.8	41	25	10	36
Carr, Maliq	1	0	1	1.0	0	0.0	0	0		0	0		0	0		0	0	0	0.0	0	0	0	0
Christie, Max	35	35	1078	30.8	324	9.3	112	293	.382	39	123	.317	61	74	.824	30	91	121	3.5	51	18	17	52
Coleman, Keon	6	0	10	1.7	5	0.8	2	5	.400	1	2	.500	0	0		1	0	1	0.2	0	3	0	3
Hall, Malik	36	7	784	21.8	320	8.9	121	235	.515	29	68	.426	49	71	.690	54	112	166	4.6	39	21	7	51
Hauser, Joey	35	29	776	22.2	254	7.3	82	184	.446	40	98	.408	50	58	.862	51	136	187	5.3	58	11	6	43
Hoggard, AJ	36	8	728	20.2	252	7.0	97	221	.439	7	32	.219	51	81	.630	14	68	82	2.3	174	25	17	71
Izzo, Steven	8	0	8	1.0	0	0.0	0	1	.000	0	1	.000	0	0		0	0	0	0.0	0	1	0	0
Marble, Julius	36	4	517	14.4	229	6.4	90	152	.592	0	1	.000	49	64	.766	30	90	120	3.3	9	12	19	41
Peterson, Michael	9	0	13	1.4	0	0.0	0	2	.000	0	1	.000	0	0		0	2	2	0.2	0	0	1	1
Sissoko, Mady	30	0	134	4.5	33	1.1	12	19	.632	0	0		9	21	.429	8	22	30	1.0	1	1	13	8
Smith, Davis	12	0	20	1.7	0	0.0	0	2	.000	0	1	.000	0	1	.000	0	1	1	0.1	1	0	0	1
Walker, Tyson	36	28	812	22.6	296	8.2	105	246	.427	35	74	.473	51	63	.810	5	42	47	1.3	153	34	5	66
Total	36		7200		2601	72.3	939	2059	.456	262	694	.378	461	615	.750	363	966	1329	36.9	565	205	181	459
Opponents	36		7200		2485	69.0	901	2138	.421	254	803	.316	429	606	.708	359	820	1179	32.8	463	228	121	373

Legend
GP	Games played	GS	Games started	Avg	Average per game
FG	Field-goals made	FGA	Field-goal attempts	Off	Offensive rebounds
Def	Defensive rebounds	A	Assists	TO	Turnovers
Blk	Blocks	Stl

== Rankings ==
Ranking movements Legend: ██ Increase in ranking ██ Decrease in ranking — = Not ranked RV = Received votes т = Tied with team above or below
	Week																			
Poll	Pre	1	2	3	4	5	6	7	8	9	10	11	12	13	14	15	16	17	18	Final
AP	RV	RV	RV	22	19	12	11	10	10	10	14	10	13	17	19	RV	RV	—	RV	Not released
Coaches	RV	RV^	RV	22	20	12	10	10	10	9	13	10	13	17	19	24	25т	RV	RV	RV

*AP does not release post-NCAA Tournament rankings.
^Coaches do not release a Week 1 poll.

== Awards and honors ==
=== In-season awards ===
Name	Award	Date
Max Christie	Big Ten Freshman of the Week	December 6, 2021
Max Christie	Big Ten Freshman of the Week	December 13, 2021
Max Christie	Big Ten Freshman of the Week	December 27, 2021
Max Christie	Big Ten Freshman of the Week	January 10, 2022
Max Christie	Big Ten Freshman of the Week	January 17, 2022

=== Postseason awards ===
==== Gabe Brown ====
- All-Big Ten Third Team (coaches)
- All-Big Ten Honorable Mention (media)

==== Max Christie ====
- All-Big Ten Freshman Team

==== Malik Hall ====
- All-Big Ten Honorable Mention (coaches)
