= 2021–22 Illinois Fighting Illini men's basketball team =

American college basketball season

2021–22 Illinois Fighting Illini men's basketball

Big Ten regular season co-champions

NCAA tournament, Second Round
- Conference: Big Ten Conference

Ranking
- Coaches: No. 19
- AP: No. 19
- Record: 23–10 (15–5 Big Ten)
- Head coach: Brad Underwood (5th season)
- Assistant coaches: Chester Frazier (1st season); Tim Anderson (1st season); Geoff Alexander (1st season)
- Offensive scheme: Spread
- Base defense: On-the-Line-Up-the-Line, Man
- Captains: Kofi Cockburn; Trent Frazier
- Home arena: State Farm Center

2021–22 Big Ten Conference men's basketball standings
	Conf.				Overall
Team	W		L	PCT	W		L	PCT
No. 19 Illinois	15	–	5	.750	23	–	10	.697
No. 14 Wisconsin	15	–	5	.750	25	–	8	.758
No. 10 Purdue	14	–	6	.700	29	–	8	.784
Rutgers	12	–	8	.600	18	–	14	.563
No. 16 Iowa †	12	–	8	.600	26	–	10	.722
Ohio State	12	–	8	.600	20	–	12	.625
Michigan State	11	–	9	.550	23	–	13	.639
Michigan	11	–	9	.550	19	–	15	.559
Indiana	9	–	11	.450	21	–	14	.600
Maryland	7	–	13	.350	15	–	17	.469
Penn State	7	–	13	.350	14	–	17	.452
Northwestern	7	–	13	.350	15	–	16	.484
Nebraska	4	–	16	.200	10	–	22	.313
Minnesota	4	–	16	.200	13	–	17	.433
† Conference tournament winner Rankings from AP poll

The 2021–22 Illinois Fighting Illini men's basketball team represented the University of Illinois in the 2021–22 NCAA Division I men's basketball season. Led by fifth-year head coach Brad Underwood, the Illini played their home games at the State Farm Center in Champaign, Illinois as members of the Big Ten Conference. They finished the season 23–10, 15–5 in Big Ten play to finish in a two-way tie for the regular-season championship. As the No. 1 seed in the Big Ten tournament, they were defeated by No. 9 seed Indiana in the Quarterfinals. They received an at-large bid to the NCAA tournament as the No. 4 seed in the South Region, where they defeated Chattanooga in the First Round before losing to Houston in the Second Round.

== Previous season ==
In a season limited due to the ongoing COVID-19 pandemic, the Illini finished the 2020–21 season 24–7, 16–4 in Big Ten play to finish in second place. They defeated Rutgers, Iowa, and Ohio State to win the Big Ten tournament and receive the conference's automatic bid to the NCAA tournament. As the No. 1 seed in the Midwest region, they defeated Drexel in the First Round before being upset by No. 8-seeded Loyola–Chicago.

== Offseason ==
Illini big man Kofi Cockburn declared for the 2021 NBA draft, before ultimately withdrawing and entering the transfer portal. After considering offers from Kentucky and Florida State, he opted to return to Illinois.

=== Departures ===
Name	Number	Pos.	Height	Weight	Year	Hometown	Notes
Zach Griffith	4	F	6'6"	220	Senior	Fisher, IL	Graduated
Edgar Padilla Jr.	10	G	6'1"	165	Freshman	Carolina, PR	Transferred to Pensacola State
Ayo Dosunmu	11	G	6'5"	200	Junior	Chicago, IL	Declared for the 2021 NBA draft; selected 38th overall pick by the Chicago Bulls
Giorgi Bezhanishvili	15	F	6'9"	245	Junior	Rustavi, Georgia	Undrafted in the 2021 NBA draft
Tyler Underwood	32	G	6'2"	180	Graduate Student	Champaign, IL	Graduated
Jermaine Hamlin	34	C	6'10"	235	Sophomore	Lincoln, IL	Transferred to Eastern Illinois
Adam Miller	44	G	6'3"	180	Freshman	Peoria, IL	Transferred to LSU

=== Incoming transfers ===
Name	Number	Pos.	Height	Weight	Year	Hometown	Previous School
Omar Payne	4	F	6'10"	240	Junior	Kissimmee, FL	Florida
Alfonso Plummer	11	G	6'1"	180	Graduate Student	Fajardo, PR	Utah

=== 2021 recruiting class ===
College recruiting
Name	Hometown	School	Height	Weight	Commit date
Luke Goode; SG	Fort Wayne, Indiana	Homestead	6 ft 5 in (1.96 m)	175 lb (79 kg)	Apr 17, 2020
Luke Goode; SG	Recruit ratings: Rivals: 247Sports: ESPN: (83)				
RJ Melendez; SF	Arecibo, Puerto Rico	Central Pointe Christian Academy	6 ft 7 in (2.01 m)	195 lb (88 kg)	Feb 15, 2021
RJ Melendez; SF	Recruit ratings: Rivals: 247Sports: ESPN: (84)				
Brandin Podziemski; SG	Muskego, Wisconsin	St. John's Northwestern Military Academy	6 ft 5 in (1.96 m)	200 lb (91 kg)	Apr 13, 2021
Brandin Podziemski; SG	Recruit ratings: Rivals: 247Sports: On3: ESPN: (81)				
Overall recruit ranking: Rivals: 18 247Sports: 24 On3: 25
Note: In many cases, Scout, Rivals, 247Sports, On3, and ESPN may conflict in their listings of height and weight.; In these cases, the average was taken. ESPN grades are on a 100-point scale.; Sources: "2021 Illinois Commits". Rivals.; "ESPN- Illinois Fighting Illini Men's Basketball Recruiting". ESPN.; "2021 Team Ranking". Rivals.; "2021–22 Illinois Fighting Illini men's basketball team". 247Sports.; "2021–22 Illinois Fighting Illini men's basketball team". On3.

== Roster ==
2021–22 Illinois Fighting Illini men's basketball team
Players
Coaches

Pos.	#	Name	Height	Weight	Year	Previous school	Hometown
G	0	Brandin Podziemski	6 ft 5 in (1.96 m)	200 lb (91 kg)	Fr	St John's Northwestern	Muskego, Wisconsin
G	1	Trent Frazier (C)	6 ft 2 in (1.88 m)	175 lb (79 kg)	GS	Wellington	Wellington, Florida
F	2	Connor Serven (W)	6 ft 9 in (2.06 m)	235 lb (107 kg)	So	St. Rita	Bushnell, Illinois
G/F	3	Jacob Grandison (injured)	6 ft 6 in (1.98 m)	210 lb (95 kg)	GS	Phillips Exeter Academy (NH) / Holy Cross	Oakland, California
F	4	Omar Payne	6 ft 10 in (2.08 m)	240 lb (109 kg)	Jr	Montverde / Florida	Kissimmee, Florida
G	5	André Curbelo	6 ft 1 in (1.85 m)	175 lb (79 kg)	So	Long Island Lutheran (NY)	Vega Baja, Puerto Rico
G	10	Luke Goode	6 ft 7 in (2.01 m)	200 lb (91 kg)	Fr	Homestead	Fort Wayne, Indiana
G	11	Alfonso Plummer	6 ft 1 in (1.85 m)	180 lb (82 kg)	GS	Coleigo La Luz / Utah	Fajardo, Puerto Rico
C	12	Brandon Lieb	7 ft 0 in (2.13 m)	220 lb (100 kg)	So	Deerfield	Deerfield, Illinois
F	13	Benjamin Bosmans-Verdonk	6 ft 8 in (2.03 m)	235 lb (107 kg)	RS So	KA Pegasus	Lommel, Belgium
G	15	RJ Meléndez	6 ft 7 in (2.01 m)	205 lb (93 kg)	Fr	Central Pointe Christian Academy	Arecibo, Puerto Rico
G	20	Da'Monte Williams	6 ft 3 in (1.91 m)	215 lb (98 kg)	GS	Manual	Peoria, Illinois
C	21	Kofi Cockburn (C)	7 ft 0 in (2.13 m)	285 lb (129 kg)	Jr	Oak Hill Academy (VA)	Kingston, Jamaica
G	22	Austin Hutcherson (injured)	6 ft 6 in (1.98 m)	190 lb (86 kg)	GS	Hun School of Princeton (NJ) / Wesleyan	New York City, New York
F	33	Coleman Hawkins	6 ft 10 in (2.08 m)	215 lb (98 kg)	So	Prolific Prep	Sacramento, California
F		Dain Dainja (redshirt)	6 ft 9 in (2.06 m)	240 lb (109 kg)	RS Fr	Baylor	Brooklyn Park, Minnesota

Head coach

- Brad Underwood (Oklahoma State)

Assistant coach(es)

- Chester Frazier (Illinois)
- Tim Anderson (Oklahoma Panhandle State)
- Geoff Alexander (Western Illinois)

Legend

- (C) Team captain
- (S) Suspended
- (I) Ineligible
- (W) Walk-on
- Injured
- Current redshirt

Roster
Last update: August 30, 2021

Note: While Dain Dainja is listed on the Illini 2021-22 roster site, he is not listed in the 2021-22 record book. Jacob Grandison, while listed as a graduate student, is a redshirt senior for eligibility purposes.

== Schedule and results ==
Date time, TV	Rank^{#}	Opponent^{#}	Result	Record	High points	High rebounds	High assists	Site (attendance) city, state
Exhibition
October 23, 2021*; 8:00 p.m., B1G+	No. 11	St. Francis (IL)	W 101–34	–	14 – Tied	7 – Hutcherson	5 – Curbelo	State Farm Center (12,799); Champaign, IL
October 29, 2021*; 7:00 p.m., B1G+	No. 11	Indiana (PA)	W 94–79	–	21 – Cockburn	9 – Hawkins	12 – Curbelo	State Farm Center (15,544); Champaign, IL
Regular season
November 9, 2021*; 7:00 p.m., BTN	No. 11	Jackson State	W 71–47	1–0	20 – Grandison	10 – Bosmans-Verdonk	4 – Plummer	State Farm Center (14,032); Champaign, IL
November 12, 2021*; 8:00 p.m., B1G+	No. 11	Arkansas State	W 92–53	2–0	17 – Hawkins	12 – Hawkins	7 – Curbelo	State Farm Center (14,327); Champaign, IL
November 15, 2021*; 6:00 p.m., FS1	No. 10	at Marquette; Gavitt Tipoff Games	L 66–67	2–1	23 – Frazier	11 – Williams	3 – Tied	Fiserv Forum (14,631); Milwaukee, WI
November 22, 2021*; 5:30 p.m., ESPNews	No. 14	vs. Cincinnati; Hall of Fame Classic semifinals	L 51–71	2–2	18 – Cockburn	10 – Williams	5 – Curbelo	T-Mobile Center; Kansas City, MO
November 23, 2021*; 6:00 p.m., ESPNews	No. 14	vs. Kansas State; Hall of Fame Classic Consolation	W 72–64	3–2	23 – Cockburn	13 – Cockburn	7 – Curbelo	T-Mobile Center; Kansas City, MO
November 26, 2021*; 7:00 p.m., B1G+	No. 14	Texas–Rio Grande Valley	W 94–85	4–2	38 – Cockburn	10 – Cockburn	8 – Williams	State Farm Center (12,782); Champaign, IL
November 29, 2021*; 8:00 p.m., ESPN2		Notre Dame; ACC–Big Ten Challenge	W 82–72	5–2	28 – Cockburn	8 – Cockburn	6 – Frazier	State Farm Center (14,907); Champaign, IL
December 3, 2021; 6:00 p.m., ESPN2		Rutgers	W 86–51	6–2 (1–0)	24 – Plummer	15 – Cockburn	5 – Frazier	State Farm Center (14,501); Champaign, IL
December 6, 2021; 6:00 p.m., FS1		at Iowa; Rivalry	W 87–83	7–2 (2–0)	21 – Tied	18 – Cockburn	6 – Williams	Carver–Hawkeye Arena (12,072); Iowa City, IA
December 11, 2021*; 4:00 p.m., FOX		No. 11 Arizona	L 79–83	7–3	27 – Frazier	13 – Cockburn	3 – Tied	State Farm Center (15,544); Champaign, IL
December 18, 2021*; 12:00 p.m., BTN		Saint Francis (PA)	W 106–48	8–3	21 – Cockburn	11 – Cockburn	5 – Frazier	State Farm Center (12,302); Champaign, IL
December 22, 2021*; 8:00 p.m., BTN		vs. Missouri; Braggin' Rights	W 88–63	9–3	25 – Cockburn	14 – Cockburn	6 – Grandison	Enterprise Center (14,953); St. Louis, MO
December 29, 2021*; 8:00 p.m., BTN		Florida A&M	Canceled due to COVID-19					State Farm Center; Champaign, IL
January 4, 2022; 6:00 p.m., FS1		at Minnesota	W 76–53	10–3 (3–0)	29 – Cockburn	10 – Cockburn	4 – Tied	Williams Arena (10,112); Minneapolis, MN
January 6, 2022; 6:00 p.m., ESPN2		Maryland	W 76–64	11–3 (4–0)	23 – Cockburn	18 – Cockburn	3 – Plummer	State Farm Center (12,981); Champaign, IL
January 11, 2022; 7:30 p.m., BTN	No. 25	at Nebraska	W 81–71	12–3 (5–0)	29 – Frazier	13 – Cockburn	5 – Frazier	Pinnacle Bank Arena (14,069); Lincoln, NE
January 14, 2022; 8:00 p.m., FS1	No. 25	Michigan	W 68–53	13–3 (6–0)	21 – Cockburn	10 – Cockburn	7 – Frazier	State Farm Center (15,544); Champaign, IL
January 17, 2022; 11:00 a.m., FOX	No. 17	No. 4 Purdue	L 88–96 ^{2OT}	13–4 (6–1)	24 – Plummer	6 – Tied	6 – Frazier	State Farm Center (15,544); Champaign, IL
January 21, 2022; 6:00 p.m., FS1	No. 17	at Maryland	L 65–81	13–5 (6–2)	18 – Plummer	8 – Williams	6 – Williams	Xfinity Center (12,331); College Park, MD
January 25, 2022; 6:00 p.m., ESPN	No. 24	No. 10 Michigan State	W 56–55	14–5 (7–2)	16 – Frazier	4 – Tied	5 – Frazier	State Farm Center (15,544); Champaign, IL
January 29, 2022; 3:30 p.m., BTN	No. 24	at Northwestern; Rivalry	W 59–56	15–5 (8–2)	22 – Cockburn	9 – Tied	4 – Grandison	Welsh–Ryan Arena (7,039); Evanston, IL
February 2, 2022; 8:00 p.m., BTN	No. 18	No. 11 Wisconsin	W 80–67	16–5 (9–2)	37 – Cockburn	12 – Cockburn	7 – Frazier	State Farm Center (14,860); Champaign, IL
February 5, 2022; 11:00 a.m., ESPN	No. 18	at Indiana; Rivalry	W 74–57	17–5 (10–2)	23 – Frazier	8 – Cockburn	4 – Tied	Simon Skjodt Assembly Hall (17,222); Bloomington, IN
February 8, 2022; 8:00 p.m., ESPN	No. 13	at No. 3 Purdue	L 68–84	17–6 (10–3)	18 – Cockburn	7 – Cockburn	5 – Frazier	Mackey Arena (14,804); West Lafayette, IN
February 13, 2022; 1:00 p.m., BTN	No. 13	Northwestern; Rivalry	W 73–66	18–6 (11–3)	19 – Cockburn	15 – Cockburn	6 – Frazier	State Farm Center (15,544); Champaign, IL
February 16, 2022; 6:00 p.m., BTN	No. 12	at Rutgers	L 59–70	18–7 (11–4)	20 – Cockburn	10 – Cockburn	5 – Curbelo	Jersey Mike's Arena (8,236); Piscataway, NJ
February 19, 2022; 11:00 a.m., ESPN	No. 12	at No. 19 Michigan State	W 79–74	19–7 (12–4)	27 – Cockburn	9 – Cockburn	5 – Tied	Breslin Center (14,797); East Lansing, MI
February 24, 2022; 8:00 p.m., FS1	No. 15	No. 22 Ohio State	L 83–86	19–8 (12–5)	26 – Plummer	4 – Hawkins	4 – Frazier	State Farm Center (15,544); Champaign, IL
February 27, 2022; 1:00 p.m., CBS	No. 15	at Michigan	W 93–85	20–8 (13–5)	27 – Cockburn	7 – Cockburn	4 – Grandison	Crisler Center (12,707); Ann Arbor, MI
March 3, 2022; 6:00 p.m., FS1	No. 20	Penn State	W 60–55	21–8 (14–5)	14 – Williams	6 – Cockburn	4 – Frazier	State Farm Center (15,544); Champaign, IL
March 6, 2022; 6:30 p.m., FS1	No. 20	No. 24 Iowa; Rivalry	W 74–72	22–8 (15–5)	21 – Cockburn	14 – Cockburn	6 – Curbelo	State Farm Center (15,544); Champaign, IL
Big Ten tournament
March 11, 2022; 11:30 a.m., BTN	(1) No. 16	vs. (9) Indiana; Quarterfinals	L 63–65	22–9	23 – Cockburn	10 – Tied	6 – Frazier	Gainbridge Fieldhouse; Indianapolis, IN
NCAA tournament
March 18, 2022*; 5:50 p.m., TNT	(4 S) No. 19	vs. (13 S) Chattanooga; First Round	W 54–53	23–9	17 – Cockburn	13 – Cockburn	4 – Tied	PPG Paints Arena (17,410); Pittsburgh, PA
March 20, 2022*; 11:10 a.m., CBS	(4 S) No. 19	vs. (5 S) No. 15 Houston; Second Round	L 53–68	23–10	19 – Cockburn	8 – Cockburn	4 – Frazier	PPG Paints Arena (18,506); Pittsburgh, PA
*Non-conference game. ^{#}Rankings from AP Poll. (#) Tournament seedings in parentheses. All times are in Central Time.

== Rankings ==
Ranking movements Legend: ██ Increase in ranking ██ Decrease in ranking RV = Received votes т = Tied with team above or below
	Week																			
Poll	Pre	1	2	3	4	5	6	7	8	9	10	11	12	13	14	15	16	17	18	Final
AP	11	10	14	RV	RV	RV	RV	RV	RV	25	17	24	18	13	12	15	20	16	19	Not released
Coaches	10	10^	15	RV	RV	RV	RV	RV	RV	24	17	21	18	13	12	14	17	15	16т	19

*AP does not release post-NCAA Tournament rankings
^Coaches did not release a Week 1 poll.
