= 2021–22 Maryland Terrapins men's basketball team =

American college basketball season

2021–22 Maryland Terrapins men's basketball
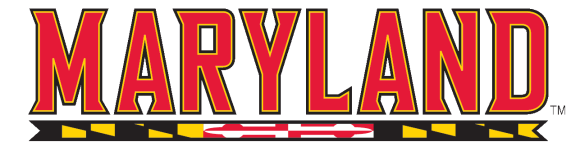
- Conference: Big Ten Conference
- Record: 15–17 (7–13 Big Ten)
- Head coach: Mark Turgeon (11th season; first 8 games); Danny Manning (interim)
- Assistant coaches: Matt Brady; Bruce Shingler
- Home arena: Xfinity Center

2021–22 Big Ten Conference men's basketball standings
| | Conf. | | | | Overall |
| Team | W | | L | PCT | W | | L | PCT |
|---|---|---|---|---|---|---|---|---|
| No. 19 Illinois | 15 | – | 5 | .750 | 23 | – | 10 | .697 |
| No. 14 Wisconsin | 15 | – | 5 | .750 | 25 | – | 8 | .758 |
| No. 10 Purdue | 14 | – | 6 | .700 | 29 | – | 8 | .784 |
| Rutgers | 12 | – | 8 | .600 | 18 | – | 14 | .563 |
| No. 16 Iowa † | 12 | – | 8 | .600 | 26 | – | 10 | .722 |
| Ohio State | 12 | – | 8 | .600 | 20 | – | 12 | .625 |
| Michigan State | 11 | – | 9 | .550 | 23 | – | 13 | .639 |
| Michigan | 11 | – | 9 | .550 | 19 | – | 15 | .559 |
| Indiana | 9 | – | 11 | .450 | 21 | – | 14 | .600 |
| Maryland | 7 | – | 13 | .350 | 15 | – | 17 | .469 |
| Penn State | 7 | – | 13 | .350 | 14 | – | 17 | .452 |
| Northwestern | 7 | – | 13 | .350 | 15 | – | 16 | .484 |
| Nebraska | 4 | – | 16 | .200 | 10 | – | 22 | .313 |
| Minnesota | 4 | – | 16 | .200 | 13 | – | 17 | .433 |
† Conference tournament winner Rankings from AP poll

The 2021–22 Maryland Terrapins men's basketball team represented the University of Maryland, College Park in the 2021–22 NCAA Division I men's basketball season. They were led by interim head coach Danny Manning. They played their home games at Xfinity Center in College Park, Maryland, as members of the Big Ten Conference. They finished the season 15–17, 7–13 in Big Ten play to finish in a three-way tie for 10th place. As the No. 10 seed in the Big Ten tournament, they lost to Michigan State in the second round.

On December 3, 2021, head coach Mark Turgeon and the school announced that the parties had mutually agreed that Turgeon would step down as head coach effective immediately. Manning, who had been hired as an assistant prior to the season, was named the interim head coach for the remainder of the season. On March 21, 2022, the school named Seton Hall head coach Kevin Willard the team's new head coach.

== Previous season ==
In a season limited due to the ongoing COVID-19 pandemic, the Terrapins finished the 2020–21 season 17–14, 9–11 in Big Ten play to finish in a tie for eighth place. As the No. 8 seed in the Big Ten tournament, they beat Michigan State in the second round but lost to the No. 1-seeded Michigan in the quarterfinals. The Terrapins received an at-large bid to the NCAA tournament as the No. 10 seed in the East region. There they upset No. 7-seeded UConn in the first round, but lost to No. 2-seeded Alabama in the second round.

== Offseason ==
=== Coaching changes ===
On April 16, 2021, two-year assistant coach DeAndre Haynes left to join Marquette new coach Shaka Smart as an assistant. On April 26, the school announced that it hired former Wake Forest head coach Manning as an assistant. On May 23, 11-year assistant coach Orlando Ranson left to join DePaul new coach Tony Stubblefield as an assistant. On June 5, the school announced former South Carolina assistant Bruce Shingler would replace Ranson.

On April 6, Director of Basketball Operations Mark Bialkoski announced he was leaving to become an assistant at East Tennessee State. On April 28, Turgeon announced Greg Manning Jr., the team's video coordinator for the three prior seasons, was named the new Director of Men's Basketball Operations.

=== Player departures ===
| Name | Pos. | Height | Weight | Year | Hometown | Reason for departure |
|---|---|---|---|---|---|---|
| Jairus Hamilton | F | 6'8" | 235 | Junior | Charlotte, NC | Transferred to Western Kentucky |
| Chol Marial | C | 7'2" | 235 | Sophomore | Rumbek, South Sudan | Transferred to Oregon State |
| Reese Mona | G | 6'2" | 185 | Senior | La Plata, MD | Graduated |
| Darryl Morsell | G | 6'5" | 200 | Senior | Baltimore, MD | Transferred to Marquette |
| Aquan Smart | G | 6'3" | 175 | Freshman | Evanston, IL | Transferred to FIU |
| Galin Smith | F | 6'9" | 235 | Senior | Clinton, MS | Graduated |
| Aaron Wiggins | G | 6'6" | 200 | Junior | Greensboro, NC | Declared for the 2021 NBA draft; selected 55th overall pick by the Oklahoma City Thunder |

=== 2021 recruiting class ===
College recruiting
| Name | Hometown | School | Height | Weight | Commit date |
|---|---|---|---|---|---|
| Ike Cornish; SF | Baltimore, MD | Legacy Charter | 6 ft 6 in (1.98 m) | 185 lb (84 kg) | Jun 10, 2020 |
| Ike Cornish; SF | Recruit ratings: Scout: Rivals: 247Sports: ESPN: | | | | |
| Julian Reese; PF | Owings Mills, MD | St. Frances Academy | 6 ft 9 in (2.06 m) | 230 lb (100 kg) | May 10, 2020 |
| Julian Reese; PF | Recruit ratings: Scout: Rivals: 247Sports: ESPN: | | | | |
Overall recruit ranking:
Note: In many cases, Scout, Rivals, 247Sports, On3, and ESPN may conflict in their listings of height and weight.; In these cases, the average was taken. ESPN grades are on a 100-point scale.; Sources: "2021 Maryland Commits". Rivals.; "2021 Team Ranking". Rivals.

=== Incoming transfers ===
| Name | Pos. | Height | Weight | Year | Hometown | Transfer From |
|---|---|---|---|---|---|---|
| Pavlo Dziuba | F | 6'8" | 235 | Sophomore | Kyiv, Ukraine | Arizona State |
| Ian Martinez | G | 6'3" | 185 | Sophomore | Heredia, Costa Rica | Utah |
| Fatts Russell | G | 5'11" | 165 | Graduate Student | Philadelphia, PA | Rhode Island |
| Qudus Wahab | F | 6'11" | 240 | Junior | Lagos, Nigeria | Georgetown |
| Simon Wright | F | 6'7" | 225 | Graduate Student | Minneapolis, MN | Elon |
| Xavier Green | G | 6'6" | 205 | Graduate Student | Williamsburg, VA | Old Dominion |

== Roster ==
2021–22 Maryland Terrapins men's basketball team
Players
Coaches

| Pos. | # | Name | Height | Weight | Year | Previous school | Hometown |
|---|---|---|---|---|---|---|---|
| G | 0 | Marcus Dockery | 6 ft 2 in (1.88 m) | 180 lb (82 kg) | So | Brewster Academy | Washington, D.C. |
| G | 4 | Fatts Russell | 5 ft 11 in (1.8 m) | 165 lb (75 kg) | GS | Imhotep Charter HS; Rhode Island | Philadelphia, Pennsylvania |
| G | 5 | Eric Ayala | 6 ft 5 in (1.96 m) | 205 lb (93 kg) | Sr | IMG Academy | Wilmington, Delaware |
| F | 10 | Julian Reese | 6 ft 9 in (2.06 m) | 230 lb (104 kg) | Fr | St. Frances Academy | Baltimore, Maryland |
| G | 11 | Xavier Green | 6 ft 6 in (1.98 m) | 205 lb (93 kg) | GS | Williamsburg Christian Academy | Williamsburg, Virginia |
| F | 12 | Pavlo Dziuba | 6 ft 8 in (2.03 m) | 235 lb (107 kg) | So | Basquet; Arizona State | Kyiv, Ukraine |
| G | 13 | Hakim Hart | 6 ft 8 in (2.03 m) | 205 lb (93 kg) | Jr | Roman Catholic HS | Philadelphia, Pennsylvania |
| G | 14 | Aidan McCool (W) | 6 ft 3 in (1.91 m) | 165 lb (75 kg) | So | Bishop England HS | Charleston, South Carolina |
| F | 15 | Simon Wright (W) | 6 ft 7 in (2.01 m) | 225 lb (102 kg) | GS | Hopkins HS; Elon | Minneapolis, Minnesota |
| G/F | 20 | Ike Cornish | 6 ft 6 in (1.98 m) | 190 lb (86 kg) | Fr | Legacy Charter | Baltimore, Maryland |
| G | 23 | Ian Martinez | 6 ft 3 in (1.91 m) | 185 lb (84 kg) | So | Junípero Serra Catholic HS; Utah | Heredia, Costa Rica |
| F | 24 | Donta Scott | 6 ft 8 in (2.03 m) | 230 lb (104 kg) | Jr | Imhotep Charter HS | Philadelphia, Pennsylvania |
| F | 31 | Arnaud Revaz | 6 ft 10 in (2.08 m) | 230 lb (104 kg) | So | Bourg-en-Brasse Acadamie | Sion, Switzerland |
| G | 32 | Brett Karkus (W) | 6 ft 4 in (1.93 m) | 185 lb (84 kg) | Fr | Berkshire School | Hewlett, New York |
| F | 33 | Qudus Wahab | 6 ft 11 in (2.11 m) | 240 lb (109 kg) | Jr | Flint Hill School; Georgetown | Lagos, Nigeria |

Head coach

- Danny Manning (Kansas, interim)

Assistant coach(es)

- Matt Brady (Siena)
- Bruce Shingler (St. Augustine's)

Legend

- (C) Team captain
- (S) Suspended
- (I) Ineligible
- (W) Walk-on
- Injured
- Current redshirt

Roster

- Forward James Graham III left the team and entered the transfer portal on December 2, 2021.

=== Depth chart ===
| Pos. | Starting 5 | Bench 1 | Bench 2 |
|---|---|---|---|
| C | Qudus Wahab | Julian Reese | Arnaud Revaz |
| PF | Donta Scott | Simon Wright | Pavlo Dziuba |
| SF | Hakim Hart |
| SG | Eric Ayala | Xavier Green | Marcus Dockery |
| PG | Fatts Russell | Ian Martinez |

== Schedule and results ==
| Date time, TV | Rank^{#} | Opponent^{#} | Result | Record | High points | High rebounds | High assists | Site (attendance) city, state |
Exhibition
| November 5, 2021*; 7:00 p.m., BTN+ | No. 21 | Fayetteville State | W 89–40 | | 16 – Reese | 10 – Ayala | 4 – Tied | Xfinity Center; College Park, MD |
Regular season
| November 9, 2021*; 7:00 p.m., BTN+ | No. 21 | Quinnipiac | W 83–69 | 1–0 | 17 – Wahab | 8 – Ayala | 4 – Russell | Xfinity Center (12,832); College Park, MD |
| November 11, 2021*; 6:30 p.m., BTN | No. 21 | George Washington | W 71–64 | 2–0 | 18 – Wahab | 15 – Wahab | 2 – Ayala | Xfinity Center (13,398); College Park, MD |
| November 13, 2021*; 2:00 p.m., BTN+ | No. 21 | Vermont | W 68–57 | 3–0 | 22 – Tied | 8 – Tied | 3 – Scott | Xfinity Center (13,424); College Park, MD |
| November 17, 2021*; 7:00 p.m., BTN | No. 20 | George Mason | L 66–71 | 3–1 | 18 – Scott | 10 – Scott | 6 – Russell | Xfinity Center (11,948); College Park, MD |
| November 19, 2021*; 6:30 p.m., FS1 | No. 20 | Hofstra | W 69–67 | 4–1 | 14 – Ayala | 8 – Scott | 4 – Russell | Xfinity Center (12,810); College Park, MD |
| November 25, 2021*; 7:00 p.m., CBSSN | | vs. Richmond; Baha Mar Hoops Bahamas Championship semifinal | W 86–80 | 5–1 | 24 – Hart | 9 – Ayala | 6 – Russell | Baha Mar Convention Center; Nassau, Bahamas |
| November 27, 2021*; 10:00 a.m., CBSSN | | vs. Louisville; Baha Mar Hoops Bahamas Championship game | L 55–63 | 5–2 | 14 – Scott | 6 – Tied | 3 – Hart | Baha Mar Convention Center (1,175); Nassau, Bahamas |
| December 1, 2021*; 7:15 p.m., ESPN2 | | Virginia Tech; ACC–Big Ten Challenge | L 58–62 | 5–3 | 18 – Wahab | 8 – Reese | 3 – Russell | Xfinity Center (15,988); College Park, MD |
| December 5, 2021; 12:00 p.m., BTN | | Northwestern | L 61–67 | 5–4 (0–1) | 18 – Hart | 9 – Scott | 5 – Russell | Xfinity Center (13,958); College Park, MD |
| December 12, 2021*; 4:30 p.m., BTN | | vs. No. 20 Florida; Basketball Hall of Fame Invitational | W 70–68 | 6–4 | 19 – Tied | 8 – Wahab | 2 – Tied | Barclays Center; Brooklyn, NY |
| December 28, 2021*; 8:30 p.m., BTN | | Lehigh | W 76–55 | 7–4 | 20 – Ayala | 8 – Tied | 3 – Tied | Xfinity Center (9,783); College Park, MD |
| December 30, 2021*; 7:00 p.m., BTN | | Brown | W 81–67 | 8–4 | 22 – Ayala | 12 – Wahab | 5 – Russell | Xfinity Center (10,224); College Park, MD |
| January 3, 2022; 9:00 p.m., BTN | | at Iowa | L 75–80 | 8–5 (0–2) | 19 – Ayala | 8 – Hart | 4 – Russell | Carver–Hawkeye Arena (10,327); Iowa City, IA |
| January 6, 2022; 7:00 p.m., ESPN2 | | at Illinois | L 64–76 | 8–6 (0–3) | 17 – Scott | 7 – Scott | 5 – Russell | State Farm Center (12,981); Champaign, IL |
| January 9, 2022; 7:30 p.m., BTN | | No. 23 Wisconsin | L 69–70 | 8–7 (0–4) | 19 – Ayala | 6 – Scott | 6 – Russell | Xfinity Center (10,864); College Park, MD |
| January 12, 2022; 9:00 p.m., BTN | | at Northwestern | W 94–87 ^{2OT} | 9–7 (1–4) | 26 – Ayala | 11 – Ayala | 7 – Russell | Welsh–Ryan Arena (2,886); Evanston, IL |
| January 15, 2022; 2:00 p.m., BTN | | Rutgers | L 59–70 | 9–8 (1–5) | 13 – Ayala | 7 – Reese | 4 – Russell | Xfinity Center (11,052); College Park, MD |
| January 18, 2022; 7:00 p.m., ESPN2 | | at Michigan | L 64–83 | 9–9 (1–6) | 22 – Ayala | 6 – Scott | 3 – Tied | Crisler Center (11,115); Ann Arbor, MI |
| January 21, 2022; 7:00 p.m., FS1 | | No. 17 Illinois | W 81–65 | 10–9 (2–6) | 25 – Scott | 7 – Russell | 3 – Hart | Xfinity Center (12,331); College Park, MD |
| January 25, 2022; 7:00 p.m., BTN | | at Rutgers | W 68–60 | 11–9 (3–6) | 23 – Russell | 8 – Ayala | 3 – Russell | Jersey Mike's Arena (8,000); Piscataway, NJ |
| January 29, 2022; 2:30 p.m., FOX | | Indiana | L 55–68 | 11–10 (3–7) | 15 – Hart | 8 – Wahab | 5 – Ayala | Xfinity Center (15,304); College Park, MD |
| February 1, 2022; 7:00 p.m., ESPN2 | | No. 13 Michigan State | L 63–65 | 11–11 (3–8) | 15 – Ayala | 8 – Wahab | 2 – Tied | Xfinity Center (14,331); College Park, MD |
| February 6, 2022; 1:00 p.m., CBS | | at No. 16 Ohio State | L 67–82 | 11–12 (3–9) | 25 – Scott | 6 – Tied | 5 – Russell | Value City Arena (15,912); Columbus, OH |
| February 10, 2022; 7:00 p.m., ESPN2 | | Iowa | L 87–110 | 11–13 (3–10) | 20 – Russell | 5 – Scott | 6 – Russell | Xfinity Center (12,649); College Park, MD |
| February 13, 2022; 1:00 p.m., CBS | | at No. 3 Purdue | L 61–62 | 11–14 (3–11) | 24 – Russell | 9 – Russell | 6 – Russell | Mackey Arena (14,804); West Lafayette, IN |
| February 18, 2022; 9:00 p.m., BTN | | at Nebraska | W 90–74 | 12–14 (4–11) | 23 – Russell | 7 – Scott | 4 – Ayala | Pinnacle Bank Arena (15,443); Lincoln, NE |
| February 21, 2022; 7:00 p.m., ESPN2 | | Penn State | W 67–61 | 13–14 (5–11) | 18 – Russell | 7 – Wahab | 4 – Martinez | Xfinity Center (15,184); College Park, MD |
| February 24, 2022; 7:00 p.m., FS1 | | at Indiana | L 64–74 | 13–15 (5–12) | 23 – Russell | 6 – Tied | 2 – Ayala | Simon Skjodt Assembly Hall (17,222); Bloomington, IN |
| February 27, 2022; 4:00 p.m., CBS | | No. 22 Ohio State | W 75–60 | 14–15 (6–12) | 27 – Russell | 9 – Scott | 3 – Russell | Xfinity Center (15,842); College Park, MD |
| March 2, 2022; 9:00 p.m., BTN | | Minnesota | W 84–73 | 15–15 (7–12) | 19 – Hart | 9 – Ayala | 4 – Russell | Xfinity Center (13,015); College Park, MD |
| March 6, 2022; 4:30 p.m., CBS | | at Michigan State | L 67–77 | 15–16 (7–13) | 19 – Ayala | 7 – Reese | 4 – Russell | Breslin Center (14,797); East Lansing, MI |
Big Ten tournament
| March 10, 2022; 6:30 p.m., BTN | (10) | vs. (7) Michigan State; Second round | L 72–76 | 15–17 | 20 – Russell | 7 – Russell | 6 – Russell | Gainbridge Fieldhouse (14,331); Indianapolis, IN |
*Non-conference game. ^{#}Rankings from AP Poll. (#) Tournament seedings in parentheses. All times are in Eastern Time.

== Rankings ==
Ranking movements Legend: ██ Increase in ranking ██ Decrease in ranking — = Not ranked RV = Received votes
| | Week | | | | | | | | | | | | | | | | | | | | |
| Poll | Pre | 1 | 2 | 3 | 4 | 5 | 6 | 7 | 8 | 9 | 10 | 11 | 12 | 13 | 14 | 15 | 16 | 17 | 18 | 19 | Final |
|---|---|---|---|---|---|---|---|---|---|---|---|---|---|---|---|---|---|---|---|---|---|
| AP | 21 | 20 | RV | — | — | — | — | — | — | — | — | — | | | | | | | | | |
| Coaches | 21 | 20^ | RV | — | — | — | — | — | — | — | — | | | | | | | | | | |

*AP does not release post-NCAA Tournament rankings
^Coaches did not release a Week 1 poll.
