= 2021–22 Penn State Nittany Lions basketball team =

American college basketball season

2021–22 Penn State Nittany Lions basketball
- Conference: Big Ten Conference
- Record: 14–17 (7–13 Big Ten)
- Head coach: Micah Shrewsberry (1st season)
- Assistant coaches: Adam Fisher; Aki Collins; Mike Farrelly
- Home arena: Bryce Jordan Center

2021–22 Big Ten Conference men's basketball standings
	Conf.				Overall
Team	W		L	PCT	W		L	PCT
No. 19 Illinois	15	–	5	.750	23	–	10	.697
No. 14 Wisconsin	15	–	5	.750	25	–	8	.758
No. 10 Purdue	14	–	6	.700	29	–	8	.784
Rutgers	12	–	8	.600	18	–	14	.563
No. 16 Iowa †	12	–	8	.600	26	–	10	.722
Ohio State	12	–	8	.600	20	–	12	.625
Michigan State	11	–	9	.550	23	–	13	.639
Michigan	11	–	9	.550	19	–	15	.559
Indiana	9	–	11	.450	21	–	14	.600
Maryland	7	–	13	.350	15	–	17	.469
Penn State	7	–	13	.350	14	–	17	.452
Northwestern	7	–	13	.350	15	–	16	.484
Nebraska	4	–	16	.200	10	–	22	.313
Minnesota	4	–	16	.200	13	–	17	.433
† Conference tournament winner Rankings from AP poll

The 2021–22 Penn State Nittany Lions basketball team represented Pennsylvania State University in the 2021–22 NCAA Division I men's basketball season. They were led by first-year head coach Micah Shrewsberry and played their home games at the Bryce Jordan Center in University Park, Pennsylvania as members of the Big Ten Conference.

== Previous season ==
In a season limited due to the ongoing COVID-19 pandemic, the Nittany Lions finished the 2020–21 season 11–14, 7–12 in Big Ten play to finish in a tie for 10th place. As the No. 10 seed in the Big Ten tournament, they defeated Nebraska before losing to Wisconsin in the second round.

On October 21, 2020, head coach Pat Chambers resigned after an internal investigation by the school into inappropriate conduct by Chambers. It had been reported in July that former player Rasir Bolton had left the program due to inappropriate comments to him by Chambers. New allegations surfaced after a later investigation by the school that led to Chambers resigning. Assistant coach Jim Ferry was named interim coach for the season.

Following the end of the season, the school hired Purdue assistant coach Micah Shrewsberry as head coach.

== Offseason ==
=== Departures ===
Name	Num	Pos.	Height	Weight	Year	Hometown	Reason for departure
Myreon Jones	0	G	6'3"	180	Junior	Birmingham, AL	Transferred to Florida
Jamari Wheeler	5	G	6'1"	170	Senior	Live Oak, FL	Graduate transferred to Ohio State
Kyle McCloskey	10	G	6'5"	212	Junior	Lower Gwynedd, PA	Walk-on; transferred
Izaiah Brockington	12	G	6'4"	200	RS Junior	Philadelphia, PA	Transferred to Iowa State
Patrick Kelly	14	F	6'8"	215	RS Freshman	Raleigh, NC	Transferred to Fordham
Trent Buttrick	15	F	6'8"	240	Senior	Bloomsburg, PA	Graduate transferred to Massachusetts
Taylor Nussbaum	20	G	6'2"	175	Senior	South Salem, NY	Walk-on; graduated
DJ Gordon	23	G	6'5"	175	Freshman	Pittsburgh, PA	Transferred to Fordham
Abdou Tsimbila	30	F	6'8"	235	Freshman	Yaoundé, Cameroon	Transferred to Fordham

=== Incoming transfers ===
Name	Number	Pos.	Height	Weight	Year	Hometown	Previous college
Irekefe Oweh	0	G	6'2"	188	Sophomore	North Brunswick, NJ	St. Thomas Aquinas
Greg Lee	5	F	6'9"	217	Graduate Student	Rockford, IL	Western Michigan
Jaheam Cornwall	11	G	6'0"	190	Graduate Student	Brooklyn, NY	Gardner–Webb
Jevonnie Scott	13	F	6'7"	252	Junior	Toronto, ON	South Plains College
Jalanni White	14	F	6'8"	205	Graduate Student	New Haven, CT	Canisius
Jalen Pickett	22	G	6'4"	202	Senior	Rochester, NY	Siena

=== Recruiting classes ===
==== 2021 recruiting class ====
There were no incoming recruits for the class of 2021.

==== 2022 recruiting class ====
College recruiting information (2022)
Name	Hometown	School	Height	Weight	Commit date
Jameel Brown #23 SG	Haverford, PA	The Haverford School	6 ft 3 in (1.91 m)	170 lb (77 kg)	Aug 23, 2021
Jameel Brown #23 SG	Recruit ratings: Scout: Rivals: 247Sports: ESPN: (82)				
Kanye Clary #38 PG	Woodstock, VA	Massanutten Military Academy	5 ft 11 in (1.80 m)	180 lb (82 kg)	Jun 3, 2021
Kanye Clary #38 PG	Recruit ratings: Scout: Rivals: 247Sports: ESPN: (80)				
Evan Mahaffey; SF	Cincinnati, OH	Archbishop Moeller High School	6 ft 5 in (1.96 m)	175 lb (79 kg)	Aug 11, 2021
Evan Mahaffey; SF	Recruit ratings: Scout: Rivals: 247Sports:				
Kebba Njie #17 C	Centerville, OH	La Lumiere School	6 ft 8 in (2.03 m)	205 lb (93 kg)	Aug 18, 2021
Kebba Njie #17 C	Recruit ratings: Scout: Rivals: 247Sports: ESPN: (82)				
Overall recruit ranking:
Note: In many cases, Scout, Rivals, 247Sports, On3, and ESPN may conflict in their listings of height and weight.; In these cases, the average was taken. ESPN grades are on a 100-point scale.; Sources: "2022 Team Ranking". Rivals.

== Roster ==
2021–22 Penn State Nittany Lions men's basketball team
Players
Coaches

Pos.	#	Name	Height	Weight	Year	Previous school	Hometown
G	0	Irekefe Oweh (W)	6 ft 2 in (1.88 m)	188 lb (85 kg)	So	St. Thomas Aquinas	North Brunswick, New Jersey
F	1	Seth Lundy	6 ft 6 in (1.98 m)	217 lb (98 kg)	Jr	Roman Catholic High School	Paulsboro, New Jersey
G	2	Myles Dread	6 ft 4 in (1.93 m)	235 lb (107 kg)	Sr	Gonzaga College High School	Detroit, Michigan
G	3	Sam Sessoms	6 ft 0 in (1.83 m)	189 lb (86 kg)	Sr	Binghamton	Philadelphia, Pennsylvania
F	4	Caleb Dorsey	6 ft 7 in (2.01 m)	235 lb (107 kg)	So	The Hill School	Westminster, Maryland
F	5	Greg Lee	6 ft 9 in (2.06 m)	217 lb (98 kg)	GS	Western Michigan	Rockford, Illinois
G	11	Jaheam Cornwall	6 ft 0 in (1.83 m)	190 lb (86 kg)	GS	Gardner–Webb	Brooklyn, New York
F	13	Jevonnie Scott	6 ft 7 in (2.01 m)	252 lb (114 kg)	Jr	South Plains College	Toronto, Ontario
F	14	Jalanni White	6 ft 8 in (2.03 m)	205 lb (93 kg)	GS	Canisius	New Haven, Connecticut
G	15	Dan Conlan (W)	6 ft 4 in (1.93 m)	180 lb (82 kg)	Jr	Dickinson College	Sewickley, Pennsylvania
F	21	John Harrar	6 ft 9 in (2.06 m)	240 lb (109 kg)	GS	Strath Haven High School	Wallingford, Pennsylvania
G	22	Jalen Pickett	6 ft 4 in (1.93 m)	202 lb (92 kg)	Sr	Siena	Rochester, New York
G	23	Dallion Johnson	6 ft 3 in (1.91 m)	182 lb (83 kg)	So	Phillips Academy	Haverhill, Massachusetts
G	33	Andy Christos (W)	6 ft 5 in (1.96 m)	179 lb (81 kg)	So	Madison High School	Madison, New Jersey
G	35	Ishaan Jagiasi (W)	6 ft 1 in (1.85 m)	180 lb (82 kg)	Jr	Huntington Prep (WV)	Wilmington, Delaware

Head coach

- Micah Shrewsberry (Hanover)

Assistant coach(es)

- Adam Fisher (Penn State)
- Aki Collins (Clark Atlanta)
- Mike Farrelly (Saint Joseph's)

Legend

- (C) Team captain
- (S) Suspended
- (I) Ineligible
- (W) Walk-on
- Injured
- Current redshirt

Roster

== Coaching staff ==
Position	Name	Year	Alma mater
Head coach	Micah Shrewsberry	2021	Hanover (1999)
Associate head coach	Adam Fisher	2021	Penn State (2006)
Assistant coach	Aki Collins	2021	Clark Atlanta (1997)
Assistant coach	Mike Farrelly	2011	Saint Joseph's (2003)
Director of Basketball Operations	Nicholas Colella	2015	Penn State (2013)
Director of Recruiting	Brian Snow	2021	Ohio State (2007)
Athletic trainer	Jon Salazer	2001	Penn State (1993)
Director of player development	Mike Green	2021	Butler (2008)
Strength and conditioning coach	Greg Miskinis	2009	Penn State (2008)

== Schedule and results ==
Games against VCU and Quinnipiac were canceled due to positive COVID-19 results within the PSU program.

Date time, TV	Rank^{#}	Opponent^{#}	Result	Record	High points	High rebounds	High assists	Site (attendance) city, state
Regular season
November 10, 2021*; 8:30 p.m., BTN		Youngstown State	W 75–59	1–0	23 – Lundy	14 – Harrar	8 – Sessoms	Bryce Jordan Center (7,884); University Park, PA
November 15, 2021*; 7:00 p.m., CBSSN		at UMass	L 56–81	1–1	14 – Lundy	12 – Harrar	7 – Pickett	Mullins Center (3,022); Amherst, MA
November 18, 2021*; 7:00 p.m., BTN+		St. Francis Brooklyn; Emerald Coast Classic campus site game	W 74–59	2–1	26 – Sessoms	13 – Harrar	3 – Pickett	Bryce Jordan Center (7,769); University Park, PA
November 22, 2021*; 6:30 p.m., BTN		Cornell	W 85–74	3–1	23 – Lundy	12 – Harrar	6 – Pickett	Bryce Jordan Center (7,515); University Park, PA
November 26, 2021*; 7:00 p.m., CBSSN		vs. LSU; Emerald Coast Classic semifinal	L 63–68 ^{OT}	3–2	14 – Pickett	10 – Sessoms	5 – Sessoms	The Arena at NFSC (2,146); Niceville, FL
November 27, 2021*; 4:00 p.m.		vs. Oregon State; Emerald Coast Classic third place game	W 60–45	4–2	14 – Pickett	7 – Lundy	2 – Dread	The Arena at NFSC (1,350); Niceville, FL
December 1, 2021*; 9:15 p.m., ESPNU		Miami (FL); ACC–Big Ten Challenge	L 58–63	4–3	16 – Harrar	12 – Harrar	4 – Pickett	Bryce Jordan Center (8,221); University Park, PA
December 5, 2021; 7:30 p.m., BTN		Ohio State	L 64–76	4–4 (0–1)	23 – Pickett	12 – Harrar	4 – Sessoms	Bryce Jordan Center (9,128); University Park, PA
December 8, 2021*; 7:00 p.m., BTN+		Wagner	W 74–54	5–4	16 – Tied	7 – Harrar	5 – Sessoms	Bryce Jordan Center (7,499); University Park, PA
December 11, 2021; 2:00 p.m., BTN		at No. 19 Michigan State	L 64–80	5–5 (0–2)	18 – Lundy	11 – Harrar	5 – Pickett	Breslin Center (14,797); East Lansing, MI
December 18, 2021*; 3:30 p.m., NBCSN		at VCU	Canceled due to COVID-19 issues at Penn State					Siegel Center; Richmond, VA
December 22, 2021*; 5:00 p.m., BTN+		Quinnipiac	Canceled due to COVID-19 issues at Penn State					Bryce Jordan Center; University Park, PA
December 29, 2021*; 6:00 p.m., BTN+		Delaware State	Canceled due to COVID-19 issues at Penn State					Bryce Jordan Center; University Park, PA
January 2, 2022; 4:00 p.m., BTN		Indiana	W 61–58	6–5 (1–2)	15 – Pickett	12 – Harrar	2 – Pickett	Bryce Jordan Center (8,844); University Park, PA
January 5, 2022; 9:00 p.m., BTN		at Northwestern	W 74–70	7–5 (2–2)	23 – Lundy	8 – Harrar	4 – Tied	Welsh–Ryan Arena (2,764); Evanston, IL
January 8, 2022; 12:00 p.m., BTN		No. 3 Purdue	L 67–74	7–6 (2–3)	21 – Pickett	8 – Harrar	10 – Pickett	Bryce Jordan Center (10,464); University Park, PA
January 11, 2022; 6:30 p.m., BTN		Rutgers	W 66–49	8–6 (3–3)	17 – Sessoms	12 – Lee	6 – Sessoms	Bryce Jordan Center (9,063); University Park, PA
January 16, 2022; 12:00 p.m., BTN		at No. 16 Ohio State	L 56–61	8–7 (3–4)	15 – Sessoms	8 – Tied	5 – Pickett	Value City Arena (13,565); Columbus, OH
January 22, 2022; 4:30 p.m., BTN		at Iowa	L 51–68	8–8 (3–5)	14 – Pickett	8 – Lee	4 – Sessoms	Carver–Hawkeye Arena (15,056); Iowa City, IA
January 26, 2022; 8:30 p.m., BTN		at Indiana	L 57–74	8–9 (3–6)	14 – Pickett	9 – Harrar	5 – Pickett	Simon Skjodt Assembly Hall (17,222); Bloomington, IN
January 31, 2022; 7:00 p.m., BTN		Iowa	W 90–86 ^{2OT}	9–9 (4–6)	19 – Harrar	11 – Lundy	3 – Dread	Bryce Jordan Center (7,977); University Park, PA
February 5, 2022; 6:00 p.m., BTN		at No. 11 Wisconsin	L 49–51	9–10 (4–7)	14 – Sessoms	9 – Tied	3 – Pickett	Kohl Center (17,287); Madison, WI
February 8, 2022; 9:00 p.m., ESPN2		Michigan	L 57–58	9–11 (4–8)	14 – Pickett	7 – Harrar	2 – Tied	Bryce Jordan Center (8,650); University Park, PA
February 12, 2022; 8:30 p.m., BTN		at Minnesota	L 70–76	9–12 (4–9)	18 – Sessoms	9 – Harrar	6 – Pickett	Williams Arena (9,948); Minneapolis, MN
February 15, 2022; 6:30 p.m., BTN		No. 19 Michigan State	W 62–58	10–12 (5–9)	17 – Lundy	16 – Harrar	3 – 4 tied	Bryce Jordan Center (8,390); University Park, PA
February 17, 2022; 7:30 p.m., BTN		Minnesota; Rescheduled from January 19	W 67–46	11–12 (6–9)	20 – Pickett	10 – Harrar	6 – Sessoms	Bryce Jordan Center (7,726); University Park, PA
February 21, 2022; 7:00 p.m., ESPN2		at Maryland	L 61–67	11–13 (6–10)	17 – Sessoms	13 – Harrar	6 – Pickett	Xfinity Center (15,184); College Park, MD
February 25, 2022; 7:00 p.m., FS1		Northwestern	W 67–60	12–13 (7–10)	15 – Johnson	20 – Harrar	6 – Pickett	Bryce Jordan Center (10,280); University Park, PA
February 27, 2022; 7:00 p.m., BTN		Nebraska	L 70–93	12–14 (7–11)	12 – Lundy	8 – Harrar	5 – Pickett	Bryce Jordan Center (8,273); University Park, PA
March 3, 2022; 7:00 p.m., FS1		at No. 20 Illinois	L 55–60	12–15 (7–12)	18 – Pickett	6 – Harrar	7 – Pickett	State Farm Center (15,544); Champaign, IL
March 6, 2022; 12:00 p.m., BTN		at Rutgers	L 58–59	12–16 (7–13)	20 – Lundy	17 – Harrar	4 – Sessoms	Jersey Mike's Arena (8,399); Piscataway, NJ
Big Ten tournament
March 9, 2022; 8:30 p.m., BTN	(11)	vs. (14) Minnesota; First round	W 60–51	13–16	22 – Pickett	12 – Harrar	4 – Pickett	Gainbridge Fieldhouse; Indianapolis, IN
March 10, 2022; 9:15 p.m., BTN	(11)	vs. (6) Ohio State; Second round	W 71–68	14–16	18 – Sessoms	9 – Harrar	5 – Pickett	Gainbridge Fieldhouse (13,565); Indianapolis, IN
March 11, 2022; 9:00 p.m., BTN	(11)	vs. (3) No. 9 Purdue; Quarterfinals	L 61–69	14–17	16 – Pickett	12 – Harrar	6 – Pickett	Gainbridge Fieldhouse (16,415); Indianapolis, IN
*Non-conference game. ^{#}Rankings from AP Poll. (#) Tournament seedings in parentheses. All times are in Eastern Time.
