= 2022 Big Ten men's basketball tournament =

U.S. collegiate basketball event

- Classification: Division I
- Season: 2021–22
- Teams: 14
- Site: Gainbridge Fieldhouse; Indianapolis, Indiana
- Champions: Iowa (3rd title)
- Winning coach: Fran McCaffery (1st title)
- MVP: Keegan Murray (Iowa)
- Television: BTN, CBS/Paramount+

2021–22 Big Ten Conference men's basketball standings
	Conf.				Overall
Team	W		L	PCT	W		L	PCT
No. 19 Illinois	15	–	5	.750	23	–	10	.697
No. 14 Wisconsin	15	–	5	.750	25	–	8	.758
No. 10 Purdue	14	–	6	.700	29	–	8	.784
Rutgers	12	–	8	.600	18	–	14	.563
No. 16 Iowa †	12	–	8	.600	26	–	10	.722
Ohio State	12	–	8	.600	20	–	12	.625
Michigan State	11	–	9	.550	23	–	13	.639
Michigan	11	–	9	.550	19	–	15	.559
Indiana	9	–	11	.450	21	–	14	.600
Maryland	7	–	13	.350	15	–	17	.469
Penn State	7	–	13	.350	14	–	17	.452
Northwestern	7	–	13	.350	15	–	16	.484
Nebraska	4	–	16	.200	10	–	22	.313
Minnesota	4	–	16	.200	13	–	17	.433
† Conference tournament winner Rankings from AP poll

The 2022 Big Ten men's basketball tournament was a postseason men's basketball tournament for the Big Ten Conference of the 2021–22 NCAA Division I men's basketball season which took place March 9–13, 2022. The tournament was held at Gainbridge Fieldhouse in Indianapolis, Indiana.

Iowa defeated Purdue in the championship game, 75–66, to win the tournament. As a result, they received the conference's automatic bid to the 2022 NCAA tournament.

== Seeds ==
All 14 Big Ten schools participated in the tournament. Teams were seeded by conference record, with a tiebreaker system used to seed teams with identical conference records. The top 10 teams received a first round bye and the top four teams received a double bye. Tiebreaking procedures remained unchanged from the 2021 tournament.

Seed	School	Conference	Tiebreak 1	Tiebreak 2
1	Illinois	15–5	1–0 vs. Wisconsin	
2	Wisconsin	15–5	0–1 vs. Illinois	
3	Purdue	14–6		
4	Rutgers	12–8	2–0 vs. Iowa/Ohio State	
5	Iowa	12–8	1–1 vs. Ohio State/Rutgers	
6	Ohio State	12–8	0–2 vs. Iowa/Rutgers	
7	Michigan State	11–9	1–1 vs. Michigan	1–3 vs. Illinois/Wisconsin
8	Michigan	11–9	1–1 vs. Michigan State	0–3 vs. Illinois/Wisconsin
9	Indiana	9–11		
10	Maryland	7–13	2–1 vs. Northwestern/Penn State	1–2 vs. Illinois/Wisconsin
11	Penn State	7–13	2–1 vs. Maryland/Northwestern	0–2 vs. Illinois/Wisconsin
12	Northwestern	7–13	1–3 vs. Maryland/Penn State	
13	Nebraska	4–16	1–0 vs. Minnesota	
14	Minnesota	4–16	0–1 vs. Nebraska	

== Schedule ==
Session	Game	Time*	Matchup^{#}	Television	Attendance	Score
First round – Wednesday, March 9
1	1	6:00 pm	No. 13 Nebraska vs. No. 12 Northwestern	BTN		69–71
1	2	8:30 pm	No. 14 Minnesota vs. No. 11 Penn State	BTN		51–60
Second round – Thursday, March 10
2	3	11:30 am	No. 9 Indiana vs. No. 8 Michigan	BTN		74–69
2	4	2:00 pm	No. 5 Iowa vs No. 12 Northwestern	BTN		112–76
3	5	6:30 pm	No. 10 Maryland vs No. 7 Michigan State	BTN		72–76
3	6	9:00 pm	No. 11 Penn State vs No. 6 Ohio State	BTN		71–68
Quarterfinals – Friday, March 11
4	7	11:30 am	No. 9 Indiana vs. No. 1 Illinois	BTN		65–63
4	8	2:00 pm	No. 5 Iowa vs. No. 4 Rutgers	BTN		84–74
5	9	6:30 pm	No. 7 Michigan St vs. No. 2 Wisconsin	BTN	16,415	69–63
5	10	9:00 pm	No. 11 Penn State vs. No. 3 Purdue	BTN	16,415	61–69
Semifinals – Saturday, March 12
6	11	1:00 pm	No. 9 Indiana vs. No. 5 Iowa	CBS/Paramount+	17,762	77–80
6	12	3:30 pm	No. 7 Michigan State vs. No. 3 Purdue	CBS/Paramount+	17,762	70–75
Championship – Sunday, March 13
7	13	3:30 pm	No. 5 Iowa vs No.3 Purdue	CBS/Paramount+	17,732	75–66

*Game times in Eastern Time. #Rankings denote tournament seeding.

== Bracket ==
First round Wednesday, March 9 BTN/Fox Sports App
12	Northwestern	71
13	Nebraska	69
11	Penn State	60
14	Minnesota	51

Second round Thursday, March 10; BTN/Fox Sports App
8	Michigan	69
9	Indiana	74
5	Iowa	112
12	Northwestern	76
7	Michigan State	76
10	Maryland	72
6	Ohio State	68
11	Penn State	71

Quarterfinals; Friday, March 11; BTN/Fox Sports App
1	Illinois	63
9	Indiana	65
4	Rutgers	74
5	Iowa	84
2	Wisconsin	63
7	Michigan State	69
3	Purdue	69
11	Penn State	61

Semifinals; Saturday, March 12; CBS/Paramount+
9	Indiana	77
5	Iowa	80
7	Michigan State	70
3	Purdue	75

Championship; Sunday, March 13; CBS/Paramount+
5	Iowa	75
3	Purdue	66

== Game summaries ==
=== First round ===
BTN

March 9
6:00 pm

Recap

No. 13 Nebraska 69, No. 12 Northwestern 71
Scoring by half: 39–25, 30–46
Pts: Alonzo Verge Jr., 21; Rebs: Lat Mayen, Alonzo Verge Jr., Derrick Walker, 7 Asts: Alonzo Verge Jr., 9	Pts: Boo Buie, 16; Rebs: Pete Nance, 8 Asts: Pete Nance, 8

Gainbridge Fieldhouse
Indianapolis, IN
Referees: Steve McJunkins, Rob Riley, Paul Szelc

BTN

March 9
8:41 pm

Recap

No. 14 Minnesota 51, No. 11 Penn State 60
Scoring by half: 28–24, 23–36
Pts: Jamison Battle, 19; Rebs: Jamison Battle, Sean Sutherlin, 6 Asts: Eric Curry, 6	Pts: Jalen Pickett, 22; Rebs: John Harrar, 12; Asts: Jalen Pickett, 4

Gainbridge Fieldhouse
Indianapolis, IN
Referees: Chris Beaver, Courtney Green, Kelly Pfeifer

=== Second round ===
BTN

March 10
11:30 am

No. 9 Indiana 74, No. 8 Michigan 69
Scoring by half: 28–41, 46–28
Pts: Jackson-Davis (24); Rebs: Jackson-Davis, Johnson (8); Asts: Johnson (7)	Pts: Jones (18); Rebs: Diabaté (12); Asts: Brooks, Houstan, Jones (3)

Gainbridge Fieldhouse
Indianapolis, IN
Referees: Paul Szelc, Robert Riley, Kelly Pfeifer

BTN

March 10
2:00 pm

No. 12 Northwestern 76, No. 5 Iowa 112
Scoring by half: 31–64, 45–48
Pts: Young (14); Rebs: 6 tied (2); Asts: Greer (4)	Pts: Ke. Murray (26); Rebs: Rebrača (9); Asts: Perkins (6)

Gainbridge Fieldhouse
Indianapolis, IN
Referees: D.J. Carstensen, Bill Ek, Rob Kueneman

BTN

March 10
6:30 pm

No. 10 Maryland 72, No. 7 Michigan State 76
Scoring by half: 34-43, 38-33
Pts: Russell (20); Rebs: Russell (7); Asts: Russell (6)	Pts: Christie (16); Rebs: Brown, Christie, Hall (6); Asts: Hoggard (6)

Gainbridge Fieldhouse
Indianapolis, IN
Attendance: 14,331
Referees: Donnie Eppley, Terry Oglesby, Rob Kueneman

BTN

March 10
9:00 pm

No. 11 Penn State 71, No. 6 Ohio State 68
Scoring by half: 24–33, 47–35
Pts: Sessoms (18); Rebs: Harrar (9); Asts: Pickett (5)	Pts: Liddell (25); Rebs: Liddell (8); Asts: Branham (4)

Gainbridge Fieldhouse
Indianapolis, IN
Referees: Lamont Simpson, Bo Boroski, Brandon Cruz

=== Quarterfinals ===
BTN

March 11
11:30 am

No. 9 Indiana 65, No. 1 Illinois 63
Scoring by half: 31–33, 34–30
Pts: Jackson-Davis (21); Rebs: Thompson (9); Asts: Johnson (6)	Pts: Cockburn (23); Rebs: Cockburn, Curbelo (10); Asts: Frazier (6)

Gainbridge Fieldhouse
Indianapolis, IN
Referees: Larry Scirotto, Rob Kueneman, Courtney Green

BTN

March 11
2:00 pm

No. 5 Iowa 84, No. 4 Rutgers 74
Scoring by half: 41–32, 43–42
Pts: Ke. Murray (26); Rebs: Ke. Murray (8); Asts: McCaffery (5)	Pts: Baker (23); Rebs: Omoruyi (7); Asts: Mulcahy (9)

Gainbridge Fieldhouse
Indianapolis, IN
Referees: Bo Boroski, Brandon Cruz, Kelly Pfeifer

BTN

March 11
6:30 pm

No. 7 Michigan State 69, No. 2 Wisconsin 63
Scoring by half: 24–22, 45–41
Pts: Bingham Jr. (19); Rebs: Bingham Jr. (11); Asts: Walker (7)	Pts: Davison (23); Rebs: Joh. Davis (11); Asts: Hepburn (4)

Gainbridge Fieldhouse
Indianapolis, IN
Referees: Lamont Simpson, D.J. Carstensen, Robert Riley

BTN

March 11
9:00 pm

No. 11 Penn State 61, No. 3 Purdue 69
Scoring by half: 31–35, 30–34
Pts: Pickett (16); Rebs: Harrar (12); Asts: Pickett (6)	Pts: Ivey (17); Rebs: Ivey (7); Asts: Williams (5)

Gainbridge Fieldhouse
Indianapolis, IN
Attendance: 16,415
Referees: Donnie Eppley, Bill Ek, Paul Szelc

=== Semifinals ===
CBS/Paramount+

March 12
1:00 pm

No. 9 Indiana 77, No. 5 Iowa 80
Scoring by half: 38–32, 39–48
Pts: Jackson-Davis (31); Rebs: Jackson-Davis (10); Asts: Johnson (9)	Pts: Ke. Murray (32); Rebs: Ke. Murray (9); Asts: Perkins (5)

Gainbridge Fieldhouse
Indianapolis, IN
Referees: Larry Scirotto, Rob Riley, Rob Kueneman

CBS/Paramount+

March 12
3:30 pm

No. 7 Michigan State 70, No. 3 Purdue 75
Scoring by half: 20–27, 50–48
Pts: Hoggard (17); Rebs: Bingham Jr., Christie (6); Asts: Hoggard (10)	Pts: Ivey (22); Rebs: Edey (10); Asts: Ivey (5)

Gainbridge Fieldhouse
Indianapolis, IN
Attendance: 17,762
Referees: D.J. Carstensen, Kelly Pfeifer, Lamont Simpson

=== Championship ===
CBS/Paramount+

March 13
3:30 pm

No. 5 Iowa 75, No. 3 Purdue 66
Scoring by half: 35–32, 40–34
Pts: Ke. Murray (19); Rebs: Ke. Murray (11); Asts: Perkins (4)	Pts: Ivey (20); Rebs: Edey (14); Asts: Ivey (6)

Gainbridge Fieldhouse
Indianapolis, IN
Attendance: 17,732
Referees: Paul Szelc, Bo Boroski, Courtney Green

== All-Tournament Team ==
- Keegan Murray, Iowa – Big Ten tournament Most Outstanding Player
- Trayce Jackson-Davis, Indiana
- Jordan Bohannon, Iowa
- Jaden Ivey, Purdue
- Trevion Williams, Purdue
