= 2021–22 Northwestern Wildcats men's basketball team =

American college basketball season

2021–22 Northwestern Wildcats men's basketball
- Conference: Big Ten Conference
- Record: 15–16 (7–13 Big Ten)
- Head coach: Chris Collins (9th season)
- Assistant coaches: Brian James; Jon Borovich; Talor Battle
- Home arena: Welsh–Ryan Arena

2021–22 Big Ten Conference men's basketball standings
	Conf.				Overall
Team	W		L	PCT	W		L	PCT
No. 19 Illinois	15	–	5	.750	23	–	10	.697
No. 14 Wisconsin	15	–	5	.750	25	–	8	.758
No. 10 Purdue	14	–	6	.700	29	–	8	.784
Rutgers	12	–	8	.600	18	–	14	.563
No. 16 Iowa †	12	–	8	.600	26	–	10	.722
Ohio State	12	–	8	.600	20	–	12	.625
Michigan State	11	–	9	.550	23	–	13	.639
Michigan	11	–	9	.550	19	–	15	.559
Indiana	9	–	11	.450	21	–	14	.600
Maryland	7	–	13	.350	15	–	17	.469
Penn State	7	–	13	.350	14	–	17	.452
Northwestern	7	–	13	.350	15	–	16	.484
Nebraska	4	–	16	.200	10	–	22	.313
Minnesota	4	–	16	.200	13	–	17	.433
† Conference tournament winner Rankings from AP poll

The 2021–22 Northwestern Wildcats men's basketball team represented Northwestern University in the 2021–22 NCAA Division I men's basketball season. They were led by ninth-year head coach Chris Collins. The Wildcats played their home games at Welsh–Ryan Arena in Evanston, Illinois as members of the Big Ten Conference. They finished the season 15–16, 7–13 in Big Ten play to finish in a three-way tie for 10th place. As the No. 12 seed in the Big Ten tournament, they defeated Nebraska in the first round before losing to Iowa in the second round.

== Previous season ==
In a season limited due to the ongoing COVID-19 pandemic, the Wildcats finished the 2020–21 season 9–15, 6–13 to finish in 12th place in Big Ten play. They lost in the first round of the Big Ten tournament to Minnesota.

== Offseason ==
=== Departures ===
Name	Number	Pos.	Height	Weight	Year	Hometown	Reason for departure
Miller Kopp	10	F	6'7"	215	Junior	Houston, TX	Transferred to Indiana
Anthony Gaines	11	G	6'4"	210	RS Junior	Kingston, NY	Transferred to Siena
Dom Martinelli	50	G	6'4"	200	Freshman	Glenview, IL	Walk-on; transferred to St. Thomas (MN)
Eric Zalewski	55	G	6'0"	185	RS Junior	Buffalo Grove, IL	Walk-on; didn't return

=== Incoming transfers ===
Name	Number	Pos.	Height	Weight	Year	Hometown	Previous college
Elyjah Williams	21	F	6'7"	220	Graduate Student	Evanston, IL	Fairleigh Dickinson

=== Recruiting classes ===
==== 2021 recruiting class ====
College recruiting information
Name	Hometown	School	Height	Weight	Commit date
Casey Simmons #21 SF	Milton, MA	Milton Academy	6 ft 5 in (1.96 m)	180 lb (82 kg)	Jun 27, 2020
Casey Simmons #21 SF	Recruit ratings: Rivals: 247Sports: ESPN: (82)				
Julian Roper #35 SG	Orchard Lake, MI	Saint Mary's Preparatory School	6 ft 3 in (1.91 m)	190 lb (86 kg)	May 4, 2020
Julian Roper #35 SG	Recruit ratings: Rivals: 247Sports: ESPN: (80)				
Brooks Barnhizer #52 SF	Lafayette, IN	Lafayette Jefferson High School	6 ft 6 in (1.98 m)	200 lb (91 kg)	Jun 21, 2020
Brooks Barnhizer #52 SF	Recruit ratings: Rivals: 247Sports: ESPN: (75)				
Overall recruit ranking:
Note: In many cases, Scout, Rivals, 247Sports, On3, and ESPN may conflict in their listings of height and weight.; In these cases, the average was taken. ESPN grades are on a 100-point scale.; Sources: "2021 Northwestern Commits". Rivals.; "2021 Team Ranking". Rivals.

==== 2022 recruiting class ====
College recruiting information (2022)
Name	Hometown	School	Height	Weight	Commit date
Rowan Brumbaugh #18 PG	Northfield, MA	Northfield-Mt. Hermon School	6 ft 4 in (1.93 m)	180 lb (82 kg)	Aug 30, 2021
Rowan Brumbaugh #18 PG	Recruit ratings: Rivals: 247Sports: ESPN: (82)				
Overall recruit ranking:
Note: In many cases, Scout, Rivals, 247Sports, On3, and ESPN may conflict in their listings of height and weight.; In these cases, the average was taken. ESPN grades are on a 100-point scale.; Sources: "2022 Northwestern Commits". Rivals.; "2022 Team Ranking". Rivals.

== Roster ==
2021–22 Northwestern Wildcats men's basketball team
Players
Coaches

Pos.	#	Name	Height	Weight	Year	Previous school	Hometown
G	0	Boo Buie	6 ft 2 in (1.88 m)	180 lb (82 kg)	Jr	Gould Academy	Albany, New York
G	1	Chase Audige	6 ft 4 in (1.93 m)	200 lb (91 kg)	RS Jr	William & Mary	Coram, New York
G	2	Ryan Greer	6 ft 2 in (1.88 m)	190 lb (86 kg)	Sr	Northfield Mount Hermon	Atlanta, Georgia
G	3	Ty Berry	6 ft 3 in (1.91 m)	185 lb (84 kg)	So	Sunrise Christian Academy	Newton, Kansas
G	5	Julian Roper II	6 ft 3 in (1.91 m)	180 lb (82 kg)	Fr	St. Mary's Prep	Detroit, Michigan
G	13	Brooks Barnhizer	6 ft 6 in (1.98 m)	215 lb (98 kg)	Fr	Jefferson High School	Lafayette, Indiana
G	14	Casey Simmons	6 ft 6 in (1.98 m)	180 lb (82 kg)	Fr	Milton Academy	Milton, Massachusetts
C	15	Ryan Young	6 ft 10 in (2.08 m)	240 lb (109 kg)	RS Jr	Bethlehem Catholic High School	Stewartsville, New Jersey
F	21	Elyjah Williams	6 ft 7 in (2.01 m)	220 lb (100 kg)	GS	Fairleigh Dickinson	Evanston, Illinois
F	22	Pete Nance	6 ft 10 in (2.08 m)	225 lb (102 kg)	Sr	Revere High School	Akron, Ohio
F	31	Robbie Beran	6 ft 9 in (2.06 m)	215 lb (98 kg)	Jr	Collegiate School	Richmond, Virginia
C	34	Matthew Nicholson	7 ft 0 in (2.13 m)	255 lb (116 kg)	So	Clarkston High School	Clarkston, Michigan
G	53	Roy Dixon III (W)	5 ft 11 in (1.8 m)	170 lb (77 kg)	Jr	Greater Atlanta Christian	Atlanta, Georgia
G	54	Dylan Sandhu (W)	6 ft 4 in (1.93 m)	160 lb (73 kg)	RS Jr	Detroit Country Day	Northville, Michigan

Head coach

- Chris Collins (Duke)

Assistant coach(es)

- Brian James (Illinois State)
- Jon Borovich (Central Michigan)
- Talor Battle (Penn State)

Legend

- (C) Team captain
- (S) Suspended
- (I) Ineligible
- (W) Walk-on
- Injured
- Current redshirt

Roster

== Schedule and results ==
Date time, TV	Rank^{#}	Opponent^{#}	Result	Record	High points	High rebounds	High assists	Site (attendance) city, state
Exhibition
November 4, 2021*; 7:00 p.m., BTN+		Lindenwood	W 85–40	0–0	17 – Berry	10 – Williams	40 – Buie	Welsh–Ryan Arena (2,563); Evanston, IL
Regular season
November 9, 2021*; 7:00 p.m., BTN+		Eastern Illinois	W 80–56	1–0	17 – Buie	7 – Young	6 – Buie	Welsh–Ryan Arena (2,753); Evanston, IL
November 12, 2021*; 7:00 p.m., BTN+		High Point	W 95–60	2–0	22 – Nance	10 – Nance	7 – Buie	Welsh–Ryan Arena (3,074); Evanston, IL
November 16, 2021*; 7:00 p.m., BTN+		New Orleans	W 83–67	3–0	18 – Nance	8 – Nance	9 – Buie	Welsh–Ryan Arena (2,593); Evanston, IL
November 18, 2021*; 8:00 p.m., BTN		Fairleigh Dickinson	W 82–46	4–0	20 – Young	11 – Nance	5 – Buie	Welsh–Ryan Arena (2,854); Evanston, IL
November 22, 2021*; 8:30 p.m., ESPN+		vs. Providence; Legends Classic semifinals	L 72–77	4–1	23 – Buie	5 – Nance	5 – Nance	Prudential Center (3,719); Newark, NJ
November 23, 2021*; 4:00 p.m., ESPN2		vs. Georgia; Legends Classic	W 78–62	5–1	22 – Buie	9 – Nance	6 – Buie	Prudential Center (0); Newark, NJ
November 30, 2021*; 8:00 p.m., ESPNU		at Wake Forest; ACC–Big Ten Challenge	L 73–77 ^{OT}	5–2	15 – Nance	7 – Nance	7 – Buie	LJVM Coliseum (3,711); Winston-Salem, NC
December 5, 2021; 11:00 a.m., BTN		at Maryland	W 67–61	6–2 (1–0)	17 – Nance	10 – Nance	4 – Buie	Xfinity Center (13,958); College Park, MD
December 12, 2021*; 3:00 p.m., ESPNU		NJIT	W 70–52	7–2	13 – Young	9 – Young	7 – Buie	Welsh–Ryan Arena (3,392); Evanston, IL
December 18, 2021*; 2:00 p.m., BTN		DePaul	Canceled due to COVID issues at DePaul					Welsh–Ryan Arena; Evanston, IL
December 20, 2021*; 6:00 p.m., BTN+		Illinois–Springfield	W 90–50	8–2	15 – Nance	8 – Tied	5 – Greer	Welsh–Ryan Arena (2,996); Evanston, IL
December 30, 2021*; 4:00 p.m., BTN		Prairie View A&M	Canceled due to COVID issues at Prairie View A&M					Welsh–Ryan Arena; Evanston, IL
January 2, 2022; 1:00 p.m., BTN		No. 10 Michigan State	L 67–73	8–3 (1–1)	13 – Nance	8 – Young	4 – Buie	Welsh–Ryan Arena (4,716); Evanston, IL
January 5, 2022; 8:00 p.m., BTN		Penn State	L 70–74	8–4 (1–2)	22 – Buie	7 – Audige	8 – Buie	Welsh–Ryan Arena (2,764); Evanston, IL
January 9, 2022; 4:30 p.m., BTN		at No. 13 Ohio State	L 87–95	8–5 (1–3)	23 – Berry	6 – Tied	8 – Buie	Value City Arena (10,620); Columbus, OH
January 12, 2022; 8:00 p.m., BTN		Maryland	L 87–94 ^{2OT}	8–6 (1–4)	28 – Nance	14 – Nance	4 – Tied	Welsh–Ryan Arena (2,886); Evanston, IL
January 15, 2022; 11:00 a.m., BTN		at No. 10 Michigan State	W 64–62	9–6 (2–4)	18 – Young	8 – Young	4 – Buie	Breslin Center (14,797); East Lansing, MI
January 18, 2022; 8:00 p.m., BTN		No. 8 Wisconsin	L 76–82	9–7 (2–5)	23 – Audige	6 – Tied	5 – Tied	Welsh–Ryan Arena (5,251); Evanston, IL
January 23, 2022; 12:00 p.m., BTN		at No. 4 Purdue	L 60–80	9–8 (2–6)	17 – Buie	4 – Tied	3 – Buie	Mackey Arena (14,804); West Lafayette, IN
January 26, 2022; 5:30 p.m., BTN		at Michigan	L 70–72	9–9 (2–7)	14 – Nance	6 – Nance	4 – Nance	Crisler Center (11,240); Ann Arbor, MI
January 29, 2022; 3:30 p.m., BTN		No. 24 Illinois; Rivalry	L 56–59	9–10 (2–8)	21 – Nance	5 – Tied	3 – Tied	Welsh–Ryan Arena (7,039); Evanston, IL
February 1, 2022; 6:00 p.m., BTN		Rutgers	W 79–78 ^{OT}	10–10 (3–8)	18 – Buie	7 – Audige	5 – Roper II	Welsh–Ryan Arena (3,079); Evanston, IL
February 5, 2022; 12:00 p.m., BTN		at Nebraska	W 87–63	11–10 (4–8)	27 – Buie	6 – Tied	4 – Greer	Pinnacle Bank Arena (15,609); Lincoln, NE
February 8, 2022; 8:00 p.m., BTN		Indiana	W 59–51	12–10 (5–8)	18 – Buie	11 – Nance	3 – Greer	Welsh–Ryan Arena (7,039); Evanston, IL
February 13, 2022; 1:00 p.m., BTN		at No. 13 Illinois; Rivalry	L 66–73	12–11 (5–9)	16 – Berry	7 – Audige	3 – Audige	State Farm Center (15,544); Champaign, IL
February 16, 2022; 8:00 p.m., BTN		No. 5 Purdue	L 64–70	12–12 (5–10)	13 – Beran	6 – Beran	4 – Greer	Welsh–Ryan Arena (7,039); Evanston, IL
February 19, 2022; 3:00 p.m., BTN		at Minnesota	L 60–77	12–13 (5–11)	18 – Nance	5 – Roper II	3 – Audige	Williams Arena (10,570); Minneapolis, MN
February 22, 2022; 7:00 p.m., BTN		Nebraska	W 77–65	13–13 (6–11)	20 – Nance	5 – Nance	5 – Nance	Welsh–Ryan Arena (3,487); Evanston, IL
February 25, 2022; 6:00 p.m., FS1		at Penn State	L 60–67	13–14 (6–12)	12 – Nance	6 – Young	7 – Buie	Bryce Jordan Center (10,280); University Park, PA
February 28, 2022; 8:00 p.m., BTN		at No. 24 Iowa	L 61–82	13–15 (6–13)	19 – Berry	8 – Nance	3 – Audige	Carver–Hawkeye Arena (13,231); Iowa City, IA
March 6, 2022; 6:30 p.m., BTN		Minnesota	W 75–62	14–15 (7–13)	19 – Nance	13 – Nance	8 – Buie	Welsh–Ryan Arena (4,551); Evanston, IL
Big Ten tournament
March 9, 2022; 5:00 p.m., BTN	(12)	vs. (13) Nebraska; First Round	W 71–69	15–15	16 – Buie	8 – Nance	8 – Nance	Gainbridge Fieldhouse; Indianapolis, IN
March 10, 2022; 1:00 p.m., BTN	(12)	vs. (5) No. 24 Iowa; Second Round	L 76–112	15–16	14 – Young	2 – Tied	4 – Greer	Gainbridge Fieldhouse; Indianapolis, IN
*Non-conference game. ^{#}Rankings from AP Poll. (#) Tournament seedings in parentheses. All times are in Central Time.

== Rankings ==
Ranking movements Legend: — = Not ranked
	Week																				
Poll	Pre	1	2	3	4	5	6	7	8	9	10	11	12	13	14	15	16	17	18	19	Final
AP	—	—	—	—																	Not released
Coaches	—	—^	—	—																	

*AP does not release post-NCAA Tournament rankings.
^Coaches did not release a Week 1 poll.
