= 2021–22 Indiana Hoosiers men's basketball team =

American college basketball season

2021–22 Indiana Hoosiers men's basketball

NCAA tournament, First Round
- Conference: Big Ten Conference
- Record: 21–14 (9–11 Big Ten)
- Head coach: Mike Woodson (1st season)
- Assistant coaches: Dane Fife (1st season); Kenya Hunter (2nd season); Yasir Rosemond (1st season)
- Captains: Trayce Jackson-Davis; Race Thompson
- Home arena: Simon Skjodt Assembly Hall

2021–22 Big Ten Conference men's basketball standings
| | Conf. | | | | Overall |
| Team | W | | L | PCT | W | | L | PCT |
|---|---|---|---|---|---|---|---|---|
| No. 19 Illinois | 15 | – | 5 | .750 | 23 | – | 10 | .697 |
| No. 14 Wisconsin | 15 | – | 5 | .750 | 25 | – | 8 | .758 |
| No. 10 Purdue | 14 | – | 6 | .700 | 29 | – | 8 | .784 |
| Rutgers | 12 | – | 8 | .600 | 18 | – | 14 | .563 |
| No. 16 Iowa † | 12 | – | 8 | .600 | 26 | – | 10 | .722 |
| Ohio State | 12 | – | 8 | .600 | 20 | – | 12 | .625 |
| Michigan State | 11 | – | 9 | .550 | 23 | – | 13 | .639 |
| Michigan | 11 | – | 9 | .550 | 19 | – | 15 | .559 |
| Indiana | 9 | – | 11 | .450 | 21 | – | 14 | .600 |
| Maryland | 7 | – | 13 | .350 | 15 | – | 17 | .469 |
| Penn State | 7 | – | 13 | .350 | 14 | – | 17 | .452 |
| Northwestern | 7 | – | 13 | .350 | 15 | – | 16 | .484 |
| Nebraska | 4 | – | 16 | .200 | 10 | – | 22 | .313 |
| Minnesota | 4 | – | 16 | .200 | 13 | – | 17 | .433 |
† Conference tournament winner Rankings from AP poll

The 2021–22 Indiana Hoosiers men's basketball team represented Indiana University in the 2021–22 NCAA Division I men's basketball season. They were led by first-year head coach, and former Indiana standout, Mike Woodson. The team played its home games at Simon Skjodt Assembly Hall in Bloomington, Indiana, as a member of the Big Ten Conference. The season officially kicked off with the annual event, Hoosier Hysteria, on October 2, 2021.

This season saw a list of streaks come to an end for the Hoosiers. They finished the season 21–14 overall, and 9–11 in conference play. Along the way, IU ended losing streaks to Purdue, Michigan, and Illinois. As the #9 seed, they also advanced to the semifinals of the Big Ten Conference tournament, something they had not done since 2013. They lost to Iowa, 80–77, the eventual tournament champions. The Hoosiers also heard their name called on Selection Sunday for the first time since 2016. After a six-year absence from the NCAA tournament, IU was selected as a #12 seed to play in the NCAA tournament First Four round in Dayton, Ohio. They knocked off Wyoming to make it to the first round (round of 64), where they lost to #5 seed St. Mary's.

== Previous season ==
The Hoosiers finished the 2020–21 season 12–15, 7–12 in Big Ten play to finish in a tie for 10th place. As the No. 10 seed in the Big Ten tournament, they lost in the first round to Rutgers.

On March 15, 2021, the school fired head coach Archie Miller after four years and began its search for the next men's head basketball coach. Just shy of two weeks of Miller being fired, on March 28, 2021, Indiana University announced that former Indiana standout, Mike Woodson, would become the 30th head coach of the IU basketball program. In addition, former Ohio State head coach, Thad Matta, was hired as an associate athletic director in men's basketball administration.

== Offseason ==
=== Coaching changes ===
On March 31, it was announced that Woodson would retain assistant coach Kenya Hunter. On April 5, it was announced that Dane Fife, former Hoosiers guard who had spent the past ten seasons as an assistant coach at Michigan State, had accepted an assistant coach position under Woodson at Indiana. Finalizing the new staff, Yasir Rosemond was announced on April 14, as the third assistant coach. With over 15 years of college basketball experience, he had helped lead multiple players to the NBA, including a few first-round draft picks. It was also revealed that Benny Sander had been promoted to director of basketball operations, and Brian Walsh assumed the role of team and recruitment coordinator. Director of Athletic Performance Clif Marshall was retained for his fifth year.

=== Departures ===
Following Miller's firing, six Indiana players from the 2020–21 season entered the transfer portal. Parker Stewart, Khristian Lander, Jordan Geronimo, and Race Thompson all withdrew from the portal following talks with Woodson and chose to remain at Indiana. On April 8, Armaan Franklin announced he would leave IU and transfer to Virginia. On April 2, Trayce Jackson-Davis also chose to return to Indiana for his junior season as opposed to entering the 2021 NBA draft, stating "I believe in Coach Woodson and I believe in the tradition of Indiana basketball" and "I don't want to be someone who ran away when it was tough."

Indiana departures
| Name | Number | Pos. | Height | Weight | Year | Hometown | Reason for departure |
|---|---|---|---|---|---|---|---|
| Cooper Bybee | 0 | G | 6'1" | 188 | Senior | Ellettsville, Indiana | Graduated |
| Al Durham | 1 | G | 6'4" | 185 | Senior | Lilburn, Georgia | Graduated/transferred to Providence |
| Armaan Franklin | 2 | G | 6'4" | 195 | Sophomore | Indianapolis, Indiana | Transferred to Virginia |
| Jacquez Henderson | 12 | F | 6'2" | 185 | (redshirt) Senior | Winter Park, Florida | Transferred |
| Jerome Hunter | 21 | F | 6'7" | 215 | (redshirt) Sophomore | Pickerington, Ohio | Transferred to Xavier |
| Joey Brunk | 50 | C | 6'11" | 255 | (redshirt) Senior | Indianapolis, Indiana | Transferred to Ohio State |

=== Incoming transfers ===
On April 7, 2021, Indiana landed its first transfer from the transfer portal when former Pittsburgh point guard Xavier Johnson committed to the Hoosiers. He arrived at IU with two years of eligibility remaining, should he choose to use his extra year granted by the NCAA due to COVID-19. Johnson made 81 career starts for the Panthers, and averaged 13.7 points on 40.2 percent shooting. He was a career 33.6 percent 3-point shooter. In his last year at Pitt, he had the highest assist rate in the ACC, 41.5 percent.

IU landed its second transfer on April 20 when Northwestern junior Miller Kopp announced his commitment. He was a career 35.7% 3-point shooter, averaging 9.6 points per game over his first three seasons with the Wildcats. He was the first player to transfer to IU from within the Big Ten since Max Bielfeldt in 2016.

A third transfer was announced on May 17, 2021, when Michael Durr of South Florida committed to play for IU. He averaged 6.7 points and 6.5 rebounds per game at USF. He was a career 47.2 percent shooter from the field and 62.9 percent from the free throw line.

Indiana incoming transfers
| Name | Number | Pos. | Height | Weight | Year | Hometown | Previous school | Years remaining | Date eligible |
|---|---|---|---|---|---|---|---|---|---|
| Xavier Johnson | 0 | G | 6'3" | 200 | Senior | Woodbridge, VA | Pittsburgh | 2 | October 1, 2021 |
| Michael Durr | 2 | C | 7'0" | 250 | Senior | Atlanta, GA | South Florida | 2 | October 1, 2021 |
| Miller Kopp | 12 | F | 6'7" | 220 | Senior | Houston, TX | Northwestern | 2 | October 1, 2021 |

=== Recruiting classes ===
==== 2021 recruiting class ====
College recruiting
| Name | Hometown | School | Height | Weight | Commit date |
|---|---|---|---|---|---|
| Logan Duncomb; C | Cincinnati, OH | Moeller High School | 6 ft 10 in (2.08 m) | 235 lb (107 kg) | Apr 7, 2020 |
| Logan Duncomb; C | Recruit ratings: Scout: Rivals: 247Sports: ESPN: (87) | | | | |
| Tamar Bates; G | Kansas City, KS | IMG Academy | 6 ft 4 in (1.93 m) | 175 lb (79 kg) | Apr 19, 2021 |
| Tamar Bates; G | Recruit ratings: Scout: Rivals: 247Sports: ESPN: (93) | | | | |
Overall recruit ranking:
Note: In many cases, Scout, Rivals, 247Sports, On3, and ESPN may conflict in their listings of height and weight.; In these cases, the average was taken. ESPN grades are on a 100-point scale.; Sources: "2021 Team Ranking". Rivals.

==== 2022 recruiting class ====
College recruiting (2022)
| Name | Hometown | School | Height | Weight | Commit date |
|---|---|---|---|---|---|
| CJ Gunn; SG | Indianapolis, IN | Lawrence North High School | 6 ft 5 in (1.96 m) | 175 lb (79 kg) | Feb 7, 2021 |
| CJ Gunn; SG | Recruit ratings: Scout: Rivals: 247Sports: ESPN: (83) | | | | |
| Kaleb Banks; F | Fayetteville, GA | Fayette County High School | 6 ft 9 in (2.06 m) | 215 lb (98 kg) | Jul 23, 2021 |
| Kaleb Banks; F | Recruit ratings: Scout: Rivals: 247Sports: ESPN: (82) | | | | |
| Jalen Hood-Schifino; CG | Montverde, FL | Montverde Academy | 6 ft 6 in (1.98 m) | 210 lb (95 kg) | Aug 24, 2021 |
| Jalen Hood-Schifino; CG | Recruit ratings: Scout: Rivals: 247Sports: ESPN: (90) | | | | |
Overall recruit ranking:
Note: In many cases, Scout, Rivals, 247Sports, On3, and ESPN may conflict in their listings of height and weight.; In these cases, the average was taken. ESPN grades are on a 100-point scale.; Sources: "2022 Team Ranking". Rivals.

==== 2023 recruiting class ====
College recruiting (2023)
| Name | Hometown | School | Height | Weight | Commit date |
|---|---|---|---|---|---|
| Jakai Newton; CG | Covington, GA | Newton High School | 6 ft 3 in (1.91 m) | 190 lb (86 kg) | Oct 22, 2021 |
| Jakai Newton; CG | Recruit ratings: Scout: Rivals: 247Sports: ESPN: (N/A) | | | | |
| Gabe Cupps; PG | Dayton, OH | Centerville High School | 6 ft 2 in (1.88 m) | 165 lb (75 kg) | Nov 16, 2021 |
| Gabe Cupps; PG | Recruit ratings: Scout: Rivals: 247Sports: ESPN: (N/A) | | | | |
Overall recruit ranking:
Note: In many cases, Scout, Rivals, 247Sports, On3, and ESPN may conflict in their listings of height and weight.; In these cases, the average was taken. ESPN grades are on a 100-point scale.; Sources: "2023 Team Ranking". Rivals.

== Roster ==
Note: Players' year is based on remaining eligibility. Because the NCAA did not count the 2020–21 season towards eligibility, last year's freshmen were still considered freshmen this season.

2021–22 Indiana Hoosiers men's basketball team
Players
Coaches

| Pos. | # | Name | Height | Weight | Year | Previous school | Hometown |
|---|---|---|---|---|---|---|---|
| G | 0 | Xavier Johnson | 6 ft 3 in (1.91 m) | 200 lb (91 kg) | Jr | Bishop O'Connell/Pitt | Woodbridge, Virginia |
| G | 1 | Rob Phinisee | 6 ft 1 in (1.85 m) | 187 lb (85 kg) | Jr | McCutcheon | Lafayette, Indiana |
| C | 2 | Michael Durr | 7 ft 0 in (2.13 m) | 250 lb (113 kg) | Jr | Oldsmar Christian School/South Florida | Atlanta, Georgia |
| G | 3 | Anthony Leal | 6 ft 5 in (1.96 m) | 205 lb (93 kg) | Fr | Bloomington South | Bloomington, Indiana |
| G | 4 | Khristian Lander | 6 ft 2 in (1.88 m) | 185 lb (84 kg) | Fr | FJ Reitz | Evansville, Indiana |
| G | 5 | Michael Shipp (W) | 6 ft 3 in (1.91 m) | 190 lb (86 kg) | So | Moeller | Cincinnati, Ohio |
| G | 11 | Shaan Burke (W) | 6 ft 5 in (1.96 m) | 185 lb (84 kg) | Fr | Vista | San Diego, California |
| F | 12 | Miller Kopp | 6 ft 7 in (2.01 m) | 220 lb (100 kg) | Jr | Houston Christian/Northwestern | Houston, Texas |
| F | 14 | Nathan Childress (W) | 6 ft 6 in (1.98 m) | 212 lb (96 kg) | So | Zionsville | Zionsville, Indiana |
| G | 15 | Sebastien Scott (W) | 6 ft 2 in (1.88 m) | 185 lb (84 kg) | Fr | San Ramon Valley | Danville, California |
| F | 22 | Jordan Geronimo | 6 ft 6 in (1.98 m) | 225 lb (102 kg) | Fr | St. Paul's School | Newark, New Jersey |
| F | 23 | Trayce Jackson-Davis | 6 ft 9 in (2.06 m) | 245 lb (111 kg) | So | Center Grove | Greenwood, Indiana |
| F | 25 | Race Thompson | 6 ft 8 in (2.03 m) | 235 lb (107 kg) | RS Jr | Armstrong | Plymouth, Minnesota |
| G | 32 | Trey Galloway | 6 ft 4 in (1.93 m) | 200 lb (91 kg) | Fr | Culver Academies | Culver, Indiana |
| G | 45 | Parker Stewart | 6 ft 5 in (1.96 m) | 202 lb (92 kg) | RS Jr | Union City/Pitt/UT Martin | Union City, Tennessee |
| C | 51 | Logan Duncomb | 6 ft 9 in (2.06 m) | 234 lb (106 kg) | Fr | Moeller | Cincinnati, Ohio |
| G | 53 | Tamar Bates | 6 ft 5 in (1.96 m) | 193 lb (88 kg) | Fr | IMG Academy | Kansas City, Kansas |

Head coach

- Mike Woodson (Indiana)

Assistant coach(es)

- Dane Fife (Indiana)
- Kenya Hunter (Duquesne)
- Yasir Rosemond (Oregon)

Legend

- (C) Team captain
- (S) Suspended
- (I) Ineligible
- (W) Walk-on
- Injured
- Current redshirt

Roster
Last update: August 3, 2021

== Schedule and results ==
| Date time, TV | Rank^{#} | Opponent^{#} | Result | Record | High points | High rebounds | High assists | Site (attendance) city, state |
International Tour Exhibition
| August 13, 2021*; 7:30 pm | | vs. BC Mega | W 79–66 | | 21 – Jackson-Davis | 9 – Geronimo | 4 – Phinisee | Atlantis Paradise Island (300); Paradise Island, Bahamas |
| August 15, 2021*; 1:00 pm | | vs. BC Mega | W 64–53 | | 13 – Johnson | 11 – Tied | 7 – Johnson | Atlantis Paradise Island (300); Paradise Island, Bahamas |
Regular season
| November 9, 2021*; 6:00 pm, BTN | | Eastern Michigan | W 68–62 | 1–0 | 21 – Jackson-Davis | 14 – Jackson-Davis | 3 – Tied | Simon Skjodt Assembly Hall (17,222); Bloomington, IN |
| November 12, 2021*; 7:00 pm, BTN+ | | Northern Illinois | W 85–49 | 2–0 | 19 – Jackson-Davis | 10 – Thompson | 3 – Tied | Simon Skjodt Assembly Hall (17,222); Bloomington, IN |
| November 17, 2021*; 9:00 pm, FS1 | | St. John's; Gavitt Tipoff Games | W 76–74 | 3–0 | 18 – Jackson-Davis | 10 – Jackson-Davis | 4 – Jackson-Davis | Simon Skjodt Assembly Hall (17,222); Bloomington, IN |
| November 21, 2021*; 7:30 pm, BTN | | Louisiana; Hoosier Challenge | W 76–44 | 4–0 | 16 – Stewart | 8 – Thompson | 6 – Tied | Simon Skjodt Assembly Hall (11,407); Bloomington, IN |
| November 23, 2021*; 7:00 pm, BTN | | Jackson State; Hoosier Challenge | W 70–35 | 5–0 | 14 – Johnson | 8 – Geronimo | 4 – Durr | Simon Skjodt Assembly Hall (10,958); Bloomington, IN |
| November 27, 2021*; 7:00 pm, BTN | | Marshall; Hoosier Challenge | W 90–79 | 6–0 | 43 – Jackson-Davis | 10 – Thompson | 7 – Johnson | Simon Skjodt Assembly Hall (12,330); Bloomington, IN |
| November 30, 2021*; 7:00 pm, ESPN2 | | at Syracuse; ACC–Big Ten Challenge | L 110–112 ^{2OT} | 6–1 | 31 – Jackson-Davis | 16 – Jackson-Davis | 9 – Johnson | Carrier Dome (21,330); Syracuse, NY |
| December 4, 2021; 12:00 pm, BTN | | Nebraska | W 68–55 | 7–1 (1–0) | 14 – Jackson-Davis | 11 – Thompson | 3 – Tied | Simon Skjodt Assembly Hall (17,222); Bloomington, IN |
| December 8, 2021; 7:00 pm, BTN | | at No. 22 Wisconsin | L 59–64 | 7–2 (1–1) | 12 – Thompson | 9 – Thompson | 7 – Johnson | Kohl Center (16,013); Madison, WI |
| December 12, 2021*; 12:00 pm, BTN | | Merrimack | W 81–49 | 8–2 | 16 – Jackson-Davis | 13 – Geronimo | 4 – Tied | Simon Skjodt Assembly Hall (17,222); Bloomington, IN |
| December 18, 2021*; 2:30 pm, FOX | | vs. Notre Dame; Crossroads Classic | W 64–56 | 9–2 | 17 – Jackson-Davis | 12 – Jackson-Davis | 5 – Phinisee | Gainbridge Fieldhouse (17,905); Indianapolis, IN |
| December 22, 2021*; 7:00 pm, BTN | | Northern Kentucky | W 79–61 | 10–2 | 21 – Jackson-Davis | 6 – Jackson-Davis | 5 – Tied | Simon Skjodt Assembly Hall (12,497); Bloomington, IN |
| December 29, 2021*; 7:00 pm, BTN | | UNC Asheville | Canceled due to COVID-19 complications within the UNC Asheville program | | | | | Simon Skjodt Assembly Hall; Bloomington, IN |
| January 2, 2022; 4:00 pm, BTN | | at Penn State | L 58–61 | 10–3 (1–2) | 20 – Jackson-Davis | 10 – Thompson | 4 – Johnson | Bryce Jordan Center (8,844); University Park, PA |
| January 6, 2022; 7:00 pm, FS1 | | No. 13 Ohio State | W 67–51 | 11–3 (2–2) | 27 – Jackson-Davis | 12 – Jackson-Davis | 4 – Galloway | Simon Skjodt Assembly Hall (14,130); Bloomington, IN |
| January 9, 2022; 12:00 pm, BTN | | Minnesota | W 73–60 | 12–3 (3–2) | 14 – Johnson | 12 – Jackson-Davis | 5 – Johnson | Simon Skjodt Assembly Hall (17,222); Bloomington, IN |
| January 13, 2022; 9:00 pm, FS1 | | at Iowa | L 74–83 | 12–4 (3–3) | 18 – Jackson-Davis | 10 – Jackson-Davis | 4 – Johnson | Carver–Hawkeye Arena (11,246); Iowa City, IA |
| January 17, 2022; 6:00 pm, BTN | | at Nebraska | W 78–71 | 13–4 (4–3) | 23 – Jackson-Davis | 12 – Jackson-Davis | 5 – Johnson | Pinnacle Bank Arena (15,290); Lincoln, NE |
| January 20, 2022; 7:00 pm, FS1 | | No. 4 Purdue; Rivalry/Indiana National Guard Governor's Cup | W 68–65 | 14–4 (5–3) | 20 – Phinisee | 9 – Thompson | 2 – Tied | Simon Skjodt Assembly Hall (17,222); Bloomington, IN |
| January 23, 2022; 3:30 pm, CBS | | Michigan | L 62–80 | 14–5 (5–4) | 17 – Jackson-Davis | 8 – Jackson-Davis | 6 – Johnson | Simon Skjodt Assembly Hall (17,222); Bloomington, IN |
| January 26, 2022; 8:30 pm, BTN | | Penn State | W 74–57 | 15–5 (6–4) | 19 – Johnson | 6 – Tied | 6 – Johnson | Simon Skjodt Assembly Hall (17,222); Bloomington, IN |
| January 29, 2022; 2:30 pm, FOX | | at Maryland | W 68–55 | 16–5 (7–4) | 18 – Thompson | 12 – Thompson | 9 – Johnson | Xfinity Center (15,304); College Park, MD |
| February 5, 2022; 12:00 pm, ESPN | | No. 18 Illinois; Rivalry | L 57–74 | 16–6 (7–5) | 13 – Thompson | 6 – Tied | 5 – Johnson | Simon Skjodt Assembly Hall (17,222); Bloomington, IN |
| February 8, 2022; 9:00 pm, BTN | | at Northwestern | L 51–59 | 16–7 (7–6) | 14 – Thompson | 11 – Jackson-Davis | 3 – Tied | Welsh–Ryan Arena (7,039); Evanston, IL |
| February 12, 2022; 3:30 pm, FOX | | at No. 17 Michigan State | L 61–76 | 16–8 (7–7) | 17 – Jackson-Davis | 14 – Thompson | 4 – Johnson | Breslin Student Events Center (14,797); East Lansing, MI |
| February 15, 2022; 9:00 pm, ESPN2 | | No. 15 Wisconsin | L 69–74 | 16–9 (7–8) | 30 – Jackson-Davis | 8 – Tied | 6 – Jackson-Davis | Simon Skjodt Assembly Hall (17,222); Bloomington, IN |
| February 21, 2022; 7:00 pm, FS1 | | at No. 22 Ohio State | L 69–80 ^{OT} | 16–10 (7–9) | 16 – Johnson | 9 – Tied | 4 – Johnson | Value City Arena (13,744); Columbus, OH |
| February 24, 2022; 7:00 pm, FS1 | | Maryland | W 74–64 | 17–10 (8–9) | 24 – Johnson | 9 – Thompson | 6 – Johnson | Simon Skjodt Assembly Hall (17,222); Bloomington, IN |
| February 27, 2022; 6:00 pm, ESPN2 | | at Minnesota | W 84–79 | 18–10 (9–9) | 24 – Johnson | 8 – Jackson-Davis | 8 – Johnson | Williams Arena (11,585); Minneapolis, MN |
| March 2, 2022; 7:00 pm, BTN | | Rutgers | L 63–66 | 18–11 (9–10) | 19 – Jackson-Davis | 9 – Jackson-Davis | 2 – Tied | Simon Skjodt Assembly Hall (17,222); Bloomington, IN |
| March 5, 2022; 2:00 pm, ESPN | | at No. 8 Purdue; Rivalry/Indiana National Guard Governor's Cup | L 67–69 | 18–12 (9–11) | 18 – Johnson | 10 – Thompson | 12 – Johnson | Mackey Arena (14,804); West Lafayette, IN |
Big Ten Tournament
| March 10, 2022; 11:30 am, BTN | (9) | vs. (8) Michigan; Second Round | W 74–69 | 19–12 | 24 – Jackson-Davis | 8 – Tied | 7 – Johnson | Gainbridge Fieldhouse; Indianapolis, IN |
| March 11, 2022; 11:30 am, BTN | (9) | vs. (1) No. 16 Illinois; Quarterfinals | W 65–63 | 20–12 | 21 – Jackson-Davis | 9 – Thompson | 6 – Johnson | Gainbridge Fieldhouse; Indianapolis, IN |
| March 12, 2022; 1:00 pm, CBS | (9) | vs. (5) No. 24 Iowa; Semifinals | L 77–80 | 20–13 | 31 – Jackson-Davis | 10 – Jackson-Davis | 9 – Johnson | Gainbridge Fieldhouse (17,762); Indianapolis, IN |
NCAA Tournament
| March 15, 2022*; 9:10 pm, TruTV | (12 E) | vs. (12 E) Wyoming; First Four | W 66–58 | 21–13 | 29 – Jackson-Davis | 9 – Jackson-Davis | 7 – Johnson | UD Arena (12,522); Dayton, OH |
| March 17, 2022*; 7:20 pm, TBS | (12 E) | vs. (5 E) No. 18 Saint Mary's; First Round | L 53–82 | 21–14 | 12 – Jackson-Davis | 6 – Geronimo | 5 – Johnson | Moda Center; Portland, OR |
*Non-conference game. ^{#}Rankings from AP Poll. (#) Tournament seedings in parentheses. All times are in Eastern Time.

== Player statistics ==
Individual player statistics (final)
| | | | Minutes | | Scoring | | Total FGs | | | 3-point FGs | | | Free-throws | | | Rebounds | | | | | | | |
| Player | GP | GS | Tot | Avg | Pts | Avg | FG | FGA | Pct | 3FG | 3FGA | Pct | FT | FTA | Pct | Off | Def | Tot | Avg | A | Stl | Blk | TO |
|---|---|---|---|---|---|---|---|---|---|---|---|---|---|---|---|---|---|---|---|---|---|---|---|
| Bates, Tamar | 32 | 0 | 459 | 14.3 | 125 | 3.9 | 44 | 130 | .338 | 17 | 57 | .298 | 20 | 24 | .833 | 7 | 33 | 40 | 1.3 | 20 | 8 | 4 | 22 |
| Childress, Nathan | 3 | 0 | 10 | 3.3 | 3 | 1.0 | 1 | 2 | .500 | 1 | 1 | 1.000 | 0 | 0 | .000 | 0 | 5 | 5 | 1.7 | 0 | 0 | 0 | 1 |
| Duncomb, Logan | 9 | 0 | 19 | 2.1 | 6 | 0.7 | 2 | 4 | .500 | 0 | 0 | .000 | 2 | 2 | 1.000 | 3 | 3 | 6 | 0.7 | 1 | 1 | 1 | 3 |
| Durr, Michael | 30 | 0 | 216 | 7.2 | 45 | 1.5 | 13 | 34 | .382 | 0 | 3 | .000 | 19 | 26 | .731 | 10 | 21 | 31 | 1.0 | 14 | 3 | 7 | 15 |
| Galloway, Trey | 20 | 3 | 417 | 20.9 | 109 | 5.5 | 45 | 97 | .464 | 6 | 28 | .214 | 13 | 20 | .650 | 5 | 28 | 33 | 1.7 | 36 | 18 | 5 | 27 |
| Geronimo, Jordan | 34 | 0 | 429 | 12.6 | 148 | 4.4 | 57 | 110 | .518 | 9 | 29 | .310 | 25 | 44 | .568 | 42 | 79 | 121 | 3.6 | 9 | 9 | 24 | 31 |
| Jackson-Davis, Trayce | 35 | 35 | 1128 | 32.2 | 639 | 18.3 | 246 | 418 | .589 | 0 | 3 | .000 | 147 | 218 | .674 | 78 | 206 | 284 | 8.1 | 66 | 22 | 81 | 59 |
| Johnson, Xavier | 34 | 34 | 941 | 27.7 | 413 | 12.1 | 131 | 323 | .406 | 36 | 94 | .383 | 115 | 147 | .782 | 18 | 110 | 128 | 3.8 | 172 | 40 | 5 | 91 |
| Kopp, Miller | 35 | 35 | 881 | 25.2 | 209 | 6.0 | 69 | 194 | .356 | 39 | 108 | .361 | 32 | 37 | .865 | 12 | 77 | 89 | 2.5 | 37 | 15 | 9 | 32 |
| Lander, Khristian | 13 | 0 | 118 | 9.1 | 38 | 2.9 | 14 | 31 | .452 | 4 | 12 | .333 | 6 | 8 | .750 | 0 | 10 | 10 | 0.8 | 12 | 4 | 1 | 18 |
| Leal, Anthony | 17 | 2 | 175 | 10.3 | 33 | 1.9 | 11 | 27 | .407 | 7 | 22 | .318 | 4 | 6 | .667 | 2 | 14 | 16 | 0.9 | 18 | 6 | 1 | 7 |
| Phinisee, Robert | 25 | 0 | 467 | 18.7 | 112 | 4.5 | 43 | 138 | .312 | 19 | 72 | .264 | 7 | 17 | .412 | 11 | 41 | 52 | 2.1 | 43 | 20 | 5 | 23 |
| Stewart, Parker | 34 | 31 | 815 | 24.0 | 211 | 6.2 | 70 | 187 | .374 | 53 | 135 | .393 | 18 | 28 | .643 | 5 | 67 | 72 | 2.1 | 33 | 14 | 2 | 33 |
| Thompson, Race | 35 | 35 | 1000 | 28.6 | 387 | 11.1 | 157 | 293 | .536 | 15 | 55 | .273 | 58 | 89 | .652 | 70 | 193 | 263 | 7.5 | 50 | 37 | 24 | 48 |
| Total | 35 | | 7075 | | 2478 | 70.80 | 903 | 1988 | .454 | 206 | 619 | .333 | 466 | 666 | .700 | 319 | 948 | 1267 | 36.2 | 511 | 197 | 169 | 415 |
| Opponents | 35 | | 7075 | | 2316 | 66.17 | 793 | 2004 | .396 | 265 | 803 | .330 | 465 | 615 | .756 | 320 | 858 | 1178 | 33.7 | 378 | 231 | 94 | 425 |

Legend
| GP | Games played | GS | Games started | Avg | Average per game |
| FG | Field-goals made | FGA | Field-goal attempts | Off | Offensive rebounds |
| Def | Defensive rebounds | A | Assists | TO | Turnovers |
| Blk | Blocks | Stl | Steals | High | Team high |

== Rankings ==
Ranking movements Legend: ██ Increase in ranking ██ Decrease in ranking — = Not ranked RV = Received votes
| | Week | | | | | | | | | | | | | | | | | | | |
| Poll | Pre | 1 | 2 | 3 | 4 | 5 | 6 | 7 | 8 | 9 | 10 | 11 | 12 | 13 | 14 | 15 | 16 | 17 | 18 | Final |
|---|---|---|---|---|---|---|---|---|---|---|---|---|---|---|---|---|---|---|---|---|
| AP | RV | RV | RV | RV | RV | — | — | — | — | RV | RV | RV | RV | RV | — | — | — | — | RV | Not released |
| Coaches | RV | ^ | RV | RV | RV | — | RV | RV | — | RV | RV | RV | RV | RV | — | — | — | — | — | — |

*AP does not release post-NCAA Tournament rankings
^Coaches did not release a Week 1 poll.

== Awards and honors ==
=== In-season awards ===
| Name | Award | Date |
|---|---|---|
| Trayce Jackson-Davis | Big Ten Player of the Week | November 15, 2021 |
| Trayce Jackson-Davis | ESPN National Player of the Week | November 29, 2021 |

=== Post-season awards ===
==== Trayce Jackson-Davis ====
- All-Big Ten Second Team
- All-Big Ten Defensive Team
- Big Ten All Tournament Team

==== Xavier Johnson ====
- All-Big Ten Honorable Mention

==== Race Thompson ====
- All-Big Ten Honorable Mention
- All-Big Ten Sportsmanship Honoree

== See also ==
- 2021–22 Indiana Hoosiers women's basketball team
