= Seth Lundy =

American basketball player (born 2000)

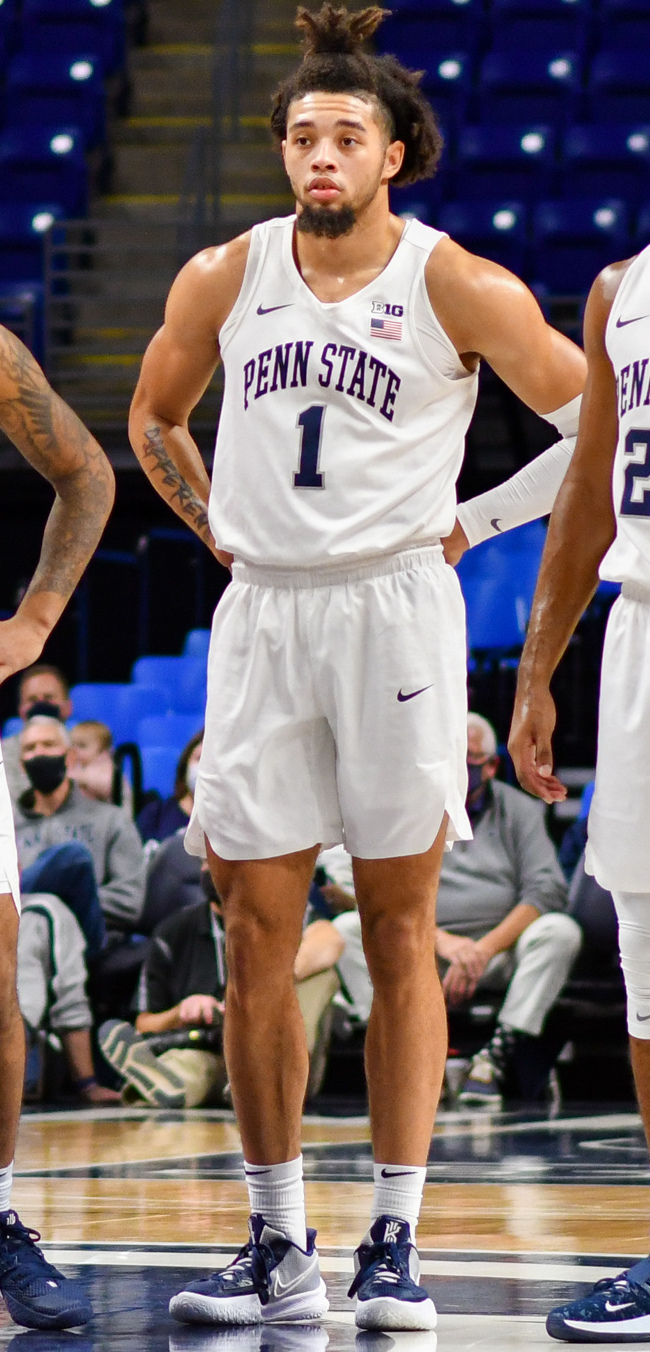
- Lundy with Penn State in 2021

No. 13 – Texas Legends
- Position: Shooting guard / small forward
- League: NBA G League

Personal information
- Born: April 2, 2000 (age 26) Paulsboro, New Jersey, U.S.
- Listed height: 6 ft 4 in (1.93 m)
- Listed weight: 220 lb (100 kg)

Career information
- High school: Roman Catholic (Philadelphia, Pennsylvania)
- College: Penn State (2019–2023)
- NBA draft: 2023: 2nd round, 46th overall pick
- Drafted by: Atlanta Hawks
- Playing career: 2023–present

Career history
- 2023–2024: Atlanta Hawks
- 2023–2024: →College Park Skyhawks
- 2026–present: Texas Legends
- Stats at NBA.com
- Stats at Basketball Reference

Seth Xavier Lundy (born April 2, 2000) is an American professional basketball player for the Texas Legends of the NBA G League. He played college basketball for the Penn State Nittany Lions.

== Early life and high school career ==
Lundy grew up in Paulsboro, New Jersey and attended Roman Catholic High School in Philadelphia, Pennsylvania. He averaged 16.4 points and 8.7 rebounds per game as a junior. Lundy committed to playing college basketball for Penn State over offers from Louisville, Marquette and Virginia Tech.

== College career ==
Lundy averaged 5.3 points per game during his freshman season at Penn State. He averaged 10.1 points and 4.2 rebounds over 25 games with 15 starts as a sophomore. After the season Lundy entered the NCAA transfer portal, but ultimately withdrew and returned to Penn State. He started all 30 of the Nittany Lions' games during his junior season and averaged 11.9 points and 4.9 rebounds while leading the team with 20 total blocked shots. Lundy was named honorable mention All-Big Ten Conference as a senior after averaging 14.2 points and 6.3 rebounds per game. After the season, he declared for the 2023 NBA draft, forgoing his remaining college eligibility.

== Professional career ==
Lundy was selected in the second round of the 2023 NBA draft by the Atlanta Hawks, with the 46th overall pick. Lundy and Jalen Pickett were the first two Nittany Lions teammates to be selected in the same NBA draft.

On July 6, 2023, Lundy signed a two-way contract with the Atlanta Hawks. On December 15, he made his NBA debut in a 125–104 win over the Toronto Raptors, scoring two points in the game.

On May 14, 2024, the Atlanta Hawks announced that Lundy had undergone surgery on May 1 to remove a medial ankle bone spur on his left ankle.

On July 9, 2024, Lundy signed another two-way contract with the Hawks, but was waived on December 18.

According to Shams Charania, the Los Angeles Clippers waived center Kai Jones to clear space for Lundy to sign a two-way contract with the team on March 1, 2025. On July 9, Lundy was waived by the Clippers.

On September 26, 2026, Seth Lundy was signed by the Dallas Mavericks. Lundy participated in the pre-season, but was ultimately waived by the Mavericks on October 17, 2026.

== Career statistics ==
Legend
GP	Games played	GS	Games started	MPG	Minutes per game
FG%	Field goal percentage	3P%	3-point field goal percentage	FT%	Free throw percentage
RPG	Rebounds per game	APG	Assists per game	SPG	Steals per game
BPG	Blocks per game	PPG	Points per game	**Bold**	Career high

=== NBA ===
Year	Team	GP	GS	MPG	FG%	3P%	FT%	RPG	APG	SPG	BPG	PPG
2023–24	Atlanta	9	0	5.8	.235	.231	.750	.8	.0	.0	.0	1.6
Career		9	0	5.8	.235	.231	.750	.8	.0	.0	.0	1.6

=== College ===
Year	Team	GP	GS	MPG	FG%	3P%	FT%	RPG	APG	SPG	BPG	PPG
2019–20	Penn State	31	15	14.8	.394	.391	.750	2.7	.5	.3	.4	5.3
2020–21	Penn State	25	15	23.8	.385	.320	.813	4.2	.8	.7	.6	10.1
2021–22	Penn State	30	30	**32.4**	.395	.348	**.867**	4.9	.7	**1.0**	**.7**	11.9
2022–23	Penn State	**36**	**36**	31.7	**.450**	**.400**	.807	**6.3**	**.9**	.8	.6	**14.2**
Career		122	96	26.0	.412	.368	.814	4.6	.7	.7	.5	10.5

== Personal life ==
Seth Lundy is one of seven children born to parents Gerald and Martina.
