= 2021–22 Nebraska Cornhuskers men's basketball team =

American college basketball season

2021–22 Nebraska Cornhuskers men's basketball
- Conference: Big Ten Conference
- Record: 10–22 (4–16 Big Ten)
- Head coach: Fred Hoiberg (3rd season)
- Assistant coaches: Matt Abdelmassih; Armon Gates; Nate Loenser; Doc Sadler
- Home arena: Pinnacle Bank Arena

2021–22 Big Ten Conference men's basketball standings
	Conf.				Overall
Team	W		L	PCT	W		L	PCT
No. 19 Illinois	15	–	5	.750	23	–	10	.697
No. 14 Wisconsin	15	–	5	.750	25	–	8	.758
No. 10 Purdue	14	–	6	.700	29	–	8	.784
Rutgers	12	–	8	.600	18	–	14	.563
No. 16 Iowa †	12	–	8	.600	26	–	10	.722
Ohio State	12	–	8	.600	20	–	12	.625
Michigan State	11	–	9	.550	23	–	13	.639
Michigan	11	–	9	.550	19	–	15	.559
Indiana	9	–	11	.450	21	–	14	.600
Maryland	7	–	13	.350	15	–	17	.469
Penn State	7	–	13	.350	14	–	17	.452
Northwestern	7	–	13	.350	15	–	16	.484
Nebraska	4	–	16	.200	10	–	22	.313
Minnesota	4	–	16	.200	13	–	17	.433
† Conference tournament winner Rankings from AP poll

The 2021–22 Nebraska Cornhuskers men's basketball team represented the University of Nebraska–Lincoln in the 2021–22 NCAA Division I men's basketball season. The Cornhuskers were led by third-year head coach Fred Hoiberg and played their home games at Pinnacle Bank Arena in Lincoln, Nebraska as members of the Big Ten Conference. They finished the season 10–22, 4–16 in Big Ten play to finish in a tie for last place. As the No. 13 seed in the Big Ten tournament, they lost to Northwestern in the first round.

== Previous season ==
In a season limited due to the ongoing COVID-19 pandemic, the Cornhuskers finished the 2019–20 season 7–20, 3–16 in Big Ten play to finish last place. As the No. 14 seed in the Big Ten tournament, the Cornhuskers lost to No. 11-seeded Penn State.

== Offseason ==
=== Departures ===
Due to COVID-19, the NCAA ruled that the 2020–21 season would not count against the eligibility of any competitor in any of the organization's winter sports, including basketball. This in turn meant that all players active in the 2020–21 season, regardless of their academic classification, could return in 2021–22. This also led the NBA and its players' union to agree that graduating seniors, who are normally automatically eligible for the NBA draft, had to declare their eligibility for the 2021 draft.

Name	No.	Pos.	Height	Weight	Year	Hometown	Notes
Teddy Allen	0	G	6'6"	223	Jr	Mesa, Arizona	Transferred to New Mexico State
Akol Arop	33	G	6'5"	203	So	Omaha, Nebraska	Transferred to Omaha
Dalano Banton	45	G	6'9"	204	So	Toronto, ON, Canada	Declared for NBA Draft
Yvan Ouedraogo	24	F	6'9"	245	So	Bordeaux, France	Transferred to Grand Canyon
Bret Porter	44	F	6'5"	228	Fr (RS)	Omaha, Nebraska	Entered Transfer Portal
Shamiel Stevenson	4	G	6'6"	245	Jr	Toronto, ON, Canada	Declared for NBA Draft
Þórir Þorbjarnarson	34	G	6'6"	202	Sr	Akureyri, Iceland	Graduated and chose not to return
Elijah Wood	3	G	6'5"	174	Fr	Potomac, Maryland	Transferred to Eastern Illinois

=== Incoming transfers ===
Name	No.	Pos.	Height	Weight	Year	Hometown	Previous school
C. J. Wilcher	0	G	6 ft 5 in	221 lbs	Sophomore	Plainfield, NJ	Xavier
Alonzo Verge Jr.	1	G	6 ft 3 in	164 lbs	Graduate Student	Chicago, IL	Arizona State
Keon Edwards	23	G	6 ft 7 in	204 lbs	Redshirt Freshman	Houston, TX	DePaul

=== 2021 recruiting class ===
On November 13, 2020, five-star shooting guard Bryce McGowens committed to Nebraska. McGowens became Nebraska's first five-star commit and highest-ranked recruit in program history. Wilhelm Breidenbach, Oleg Kojenets, Quaran McPherson, and Keisei Tominaga rounded out the 2021 class.

College recruiting
Name	Hometown	School	Height	Weight	Commit date
Wilhelm Breidenbach; C	Santa Ana, CA	Mater Dei High School	6 ft 9 in (2.06 m)	200 lb (91 kg)	Oct 1, 2020
Wilhelm Breidenbach; C	Recruit ratings: Scout: Rivals: 247Sports: (84)				
Oleg Kojenets; C	Kaunas, Lithuania	Western Reserve Academy	7 ft 0 in (2.13 m)	220 lb (100 kg)	Apr 5, 2021
Oleg Kojenets; C	Recruit ratings: No ratings found				
Bryce McGowens; SG	Pendleton, SC	Legacy Charter	6 ft 6 in (1.98 m)	175 lb (79 kg)	Nov 13, 2020
Bryce McGowens; SG	Recruit ratings: Scout: Rivals: 247Sports: (90)				
Quaran McPherson; PG	Queens, NY	Link Year Prep	6 ft 3 in (1.91 m)	180 lb (82 kg)	May 3, 2021
Quaran McPherson; PG	Recruit ratings: Rivals: 247Sports:				
Keisei Tominaga; SG	Nagoya, Japan	Sakuragaoka Gakuen High School; Ranger College	6 ft 1 in (1.85 m)	165 lb (75 kg)	Nov 28, 2019
Keisei Tominaga; SG	Recruit ratings: Scout: Rivals: 247Sports:				
Overall recruit ranking: Rivals: 20 247Sports: 18 ESPN: 13
Note: In many cases, Scout, Rivals, 247Sports, On3, and ESPN may conflict in their listings of height and weight.; In these cases, the average was taken. ESPN grades are on a 100-point scale.; Sources: "2021 Team Ranking". Rivals.

== Roster ==
2021–22 Nebraska Cornhuskers men's basketball team
Players
Coaches

Pos.	#	Name	Height	Weight	Year	Previous school	Hometown
G	0	C. J. Wilcher	6 ft 5 in (1.96 m)	221 lb (100 kg)	So	Xavier	Plainfield, NJ
G	1	Alonzo Verge Jr.	6 ft 3 in (1.91 m)	164 lb (74 kg)	GS	Arizona State	Chicago, IL
G	2	Trey McGowens	6 ft 4 in (1.93 m)	196 lb (89 kg)	Sr	Pittsburgh	Pendleton, SC
G	3	Quaran McPherson	6 ft 3 in (1.91 m)	199 lb (90 kg)	Fr	Link Year Prep	Queens, NY
G	4	Jackson Cronin (W)	6 ft 1 in (1.85 m)	187 lb (85 kg)	Fr	Great Neck North High School	Great Neck, NY
G	5	Bryce McGowens	6 ft 7 in (2.01 m)	179 lb (81 kg)	Fr	Legacy Charter	Pendleton, SC
G	10	Kobe Webster	6 ft 0 in (1.83 m)	176 lb (80 kg)	GS	Western Illinois	Indianapolis, IN
F	11	Lat Mayen	6 ft 9 in (2.06 m)	217 lb (98 kg)	RS Sr	Chipola	Adelaide, Australia
G	12	Sam Hoiberg (W)	6 ft 0 in (1.83 m)	183 lb (83 kg)	Fr	Pius X High School	Lincoln, NE
F	13	Derrick Walker	6 ft 9 in (2.06 m)	239 lb (108 kg)	RS Sr	Tennessee	Kansas City, MO
F	14	Trevor Lakes	6 ft 8 in (2.03 m)	220 lb (100 kg)	GS	Indianapolis	Lebanon, IN
G	15	Chris McGraw (W)	6 ft 0 in (1.83 m)	176 lb (80 kg)	RS Jr	Otterbein	Columbus, OH
G	21	Jace Piatkowski (W)	6 ft 3 in (1.91 m)	177 lb (80 kg)	RS So	Elkhorn South HS	Omaha, NE
G	23	Keon Edwards	6 ft 7 in (2.01 m)	204 lb (93 kg)	RS Fr	DePaul	Houston, TX
G	30	Keisei Tominaga	6 ft 2 in (1.88 m)	178 lb (81 kg)	Jr	Ranger College	Nagoya, Japan
F	32	Wilhelm Breidenbach	6 ft 10 in (2.08 m)	227 lb (103 kg)	Fr	Mater Dei HS	Rancho Santa Margarita, CA
C	33	Oleg Kojenets	7 ft 0 in (2.13 m)	223 lb (101 kg)	Fr	Western Reserve Academy	Kaunas, Lithuania
C	35	Eduardo Andre	6 ft 11 in (2.11 m)	236 lb (107 kg)	So	AZ Compass Prep	London, England

Head coach

- Fred Hoiberg (Iowa State)

Assistant coach(es)

- Matt Abdelmassih (St. John's)
- Armon Gates (Kent State)
- Nate Loenser (Iowa State)
- Doc Sadler (Arkansas) (special asst. to HC)

Legend

- (C) Team captain
- (S) Suspended
- (I) Ineligible
- (W) Walk-on
- Injured
- Current redshirt

Roster

== Schedule and results ==
Date time, TV	Rank^{#}	Opponent^{#}	Result	Record	High points	High rebounds	High assists	Site (attendance) city, state
Exhibition
October 27, 2021*; 6:00 p.m., BTN+		Peru State	W 97–58	0–0	20 – Verge Jr.	6 – Tied	8 – Verge Jr.	Pinnacle Bank Arena (15,542); Lincoln, NE
October 31, 2021*; 11:00 a.m., BTN+		Colorado; Charity Exhibition	W 82–67	0–0	15 – B. McGowens	6 – Walker	6 – Verge Jr.	Pinnacle Bank Arena (15,345); Lincoln, NE
Regular Season
November 9, 2021*; 7:00 p.m., BTN+		Western Illinois	L 74–75	0–1	26 – Verge Jr.	13 – Verge Jr.	5 – Verge Jr.	Pinnacle Bank Arena (15,312); Lincoln, NE
November 12, 2021*; 7:30 p.m., BTN+		Sam Houston State	W 74–65	1–1	29 – B. McGowens	9 – T. McGowens	7 – Verge Jr.	Pinnacle Bank Arena (15,474); Lincoln, NE
November 16, 2021*; 6:00 p.m., FS1		Creighton; Rivalry/Gavitt Tipoff Games	L 69–77	1–2	20 – Webster	5 – Tied	4 – Verge Jr.	Pinnacle Bank Arena (15,939); Lincoln, NE
November 19, 2021*; 6:00 p.m., BTN+		Idaho State	W 78–60	2–2	14 – Walker	7 – B. McGowens	5 – Webster	Pinnacle Bank Arena (15,274); Lincoln, NE
November 21, 2021*; 3:00 p.m., ESPNU		Southern; Nebraska MTE	W 82–59	3–2	18 – B. McGowens	11 – B. McGowens	4 – Tied	Pinnacle Bank Arena (15,255); Lincoln, NE
November 23, 2021*; 8:00 p.m., BTN		Tennessee State; Nebraska MTE	W 79–73	4–2	18 – Tied	6 – Tied	10 – Verge Jr.	Pinnacle Bank Arena (15,236); Lincoln, NE
November 27, 2021*; 1:00 p.m., BTN+		South Dakota; Nebraska MTE	W 83–70	5–2	23 – Tominaga	8 – B. McGowens	5 – Verge Jr.	Pinnacle Bank Arena (15,685); Lincoln, NE
December 1, 2021*; 6:15 p.m., ESPNU		at NC State; ACC–Big Ten Challenge	L 100–104 ^{4OT}	5–3	25 – Verge Jr.	13 – Walker	11 – Verge Jr.	PNC Arena (11,562); Raleigh, NC
December 4, 2021; 11:00 a.m., BTN		at Indiana	L 55–68	5–4 (0–1)	15 – Verge Jr.	5 – Tied	3 – Verge Jr.	Simon Skjodt Assembly Hall (17,222); Bloomington, IN
December 7, 2021; 6:00 p.m., ESPN2		Michigan	L 67–102	5–5 (0–2)	31 – Verge Jr.	8 – Verge Jr.	3 – Verge Jr.	Pinnacle Bank Arena (15,426); Lincoln, NE
December 11, 2021*; 10:30 a.m., ESPN2		vs. No. 18 Auburn; Holiday Hoopsgiving	L 68–99	5–6	17 – Wilcher	10 – Walker	4 – Tied	State Farm Arena (8,557); Atlanta, GA
December 19, 2021*; 5:00 p.m., BTN		Kansas State	L 58–67	5–7	21 – Verge Jr.	9 – Walker	5 – Verge Jr.	Pinnacle Bank Arena (15,000); Lincoln, NE
December 22, 2021*; 6:30 p.m., ESPNU		Kennesaw State	W 88–74	6–7	18 – Tominaga	7 – Verge Jr.	12 – Verge Jr.	Pinnacle Bank Arena (15,000); Lincoln, NE
January 2, 2022; 7:00 p.m., BTN		No. 13 Ohio State	L 79–87 ^{OT}	6–8 (0–3)	18 – B. McGowens	10 – Walker	4 – Verge Jr.	Pinnacle Bank Arena (14,478); Lincoln, NE
January 5, 2022; 6:00 p.m., BTN		at No. 10 Michigan State	L 67–79	6–9 (0–4)	16 – Walker	4 – Tied	5 – Verge Jr.	Breslin Center (14,797); East Lansing, MI
January 8, 2022; 1:00 p.m., BTN		at Rutgers	L 65–93	6–10 (0–5)	17 – B. McGowens	6 – Walker	4 – Verge Jr.	Jersey Mike's Arena (8,000); Piscataway, NJ
January 11, 2022; 7:30 p.m., BTN		No. 25 Illinois	L 71–81	6–11 (0–6)	19 – B. McGowens	7 – Walker	9 – Verge Jr.	Pinnacle Bank Arena (14,069); Lincoln, NE
January 14, 2022; 5:30 p.m., FS1		at No. 7 Purdue	L 65–92	6–12 (0–7)	11 – Tominaga	8 – Mayen	5 – Webster	Mackey Arena (14,804); West Lafayette, IN
January 17, 2022; 5:00 p.m., BTN		Indiana	L 71–78	6–13 (0–8)	20 – B. McGowens	5 – B. McGowens	4 – Verge Jr.	Pinnacle Bank Arena (15,290); Lincoln, NE
January 27, 2022; 4:00 p.m., BTN		No. 11 Wisconsin; Rescheduled from January 25	L 65–73	6–14 (0–9)	23 – B. McGowens	5 – Tied	4 – Walker	Pinnacle Bank Arena (15,385); Lincoln, NE
January 29, 2022; 5:30 p.m., BTN		Rutgers	L 61–63	6–15 (0–10)	29 – B. McGowens	8 – Mayen	3 – Mayen	Pinnacle Bank Arena (15,671); Lincoln, NE
February 1, 2022; 8:00 p.m., BTN		at Michigan	L 79–85	6–16 (0–11)	24 – B. McGowens	6 – B. McGowens	3 – Verge Jr.	Crisler Center (9,301); Ann Arbor, MI
February 5, 2022; 12:00 p.m., BTN		Northwestern	L 63–87	6–17 (0–12)	15 – Wilcher	6 – Walker	6 – Verge Jr.	Pinnacle Bank Arena (15,609); Lincoln, NE
February 9, 2022; 8:00 p.m., BTN		Minnesota	W 78-65	7–17 (1–12)	22 – Verge Jr.	7 – Tied	5 – T. McGowens	Pinnacle Bank Arena (15,303); Lincoln, NE
February 13, 2022; 1:00 p.m., FS1		at Iowa	L 75–98	7–18 (1–13)	14 – Walker	6 – Walker	6 – Verge Jr.	Carver–Hawkeye Arena (13,772); Iowa City, IA
February 18, 2022; 8:00 p.m., BTN		Maryland	L 74–90	7–19 (1–14)	25 – B. McGowens	6 – Walker	5 – Verge Jr.	Pinnacle Bank Arena (15,443); Lincoln, NE
February 22, 2022; 7:00 p.m., BTN		at Northwestern	L 65–77	7–20 (1–15)	15 – B. McGowens	10 – B. McGowens	5 – Walker	Welsh–Ryan Arena (3,487); Evanston, IL
February 25, 2022; 8:00 p.m., FS1		No. 25 Iowa	L 78–88	7–21 (1–16)	18 – Verge Jr.	8 – Walker	7 – Verge Jr.	Pinnacle Bank Arena (15,960); Lincoln, NE
February 27, 2022; 6:00 p.m., BTN		at Penn State	W 93–70	8–21 (2–16)	25 – B. McGowens	7 – Walker	5 – Verge Jr.	Bryce Jordan Center (8,273); University Park, PA
March 1, 2022; 6:00 p.m., BTN		at No. 23 Ohio State; Rescheduled from January 22	W 78–70	9–21 (3–16)	26 – B. McGowens	6 – T. McGowens	7 – Verge Jr.	Value City Arena (12,268); Columbus, OH
March 6, 2022; 1:00 p.m., BTN		at No. 10 Wisconsin	W 74-73	10-21 (4-16)	26 – Verge Jr.	7 – Walker	6 – Verge Jr.	Kohl Center (17,287); Madison, WI
Big Ten tournament
March 9, 2022; 5:00 p.m., BTN	(13)	vs. (12) Northwestern; First round	L 69–71	10–22	21 – Verge Jr.	7 – Tied	9 – Verge Jr.	Gainbridge Fieldhouse; Indianapolis, IN
*Non-conference game. ^{#}Rankings from AP Poll. (#) Tournament seedings in parentheses. All times are in Central Time.
