= 2021–22 Minnesota Golden Gophers men's basketball team =

Basketball team

2021–22 Minnesota Golden Gophers men's basketball

Asheville Championship champions
- Conference: Big Ten Conference
- Record: 13–17 (4–16 Big Ten)
- Head coach: Ben Johnson (1st season)
- Assistant coaches: Dave Thorson (1st season); Jason Kemp (1st season); Marcus Jenkins (1st season)
- Home arena: Williams Arena

2021–22 Big Ten Conference men's basketball standings
| | Conf. | | | | Overall |
| Team | W | | L | PCT | W | | L | PCT |
|---|---|---|---|---|---|---|---|---|
| No. 19 Illinois | 15 | – | 5 | .750 | 23 | – | 10 | .697 |
| No. 14 Wisconsin | 15 | – | 5 | .750 | 25 | – | 8 | .758 |
| No. 10 Purdue | 14 | – | 6 | .700 | 29 | – | 8 | .784 |
| Rutgers | 12 | – | 8 | .600 | 18 | – | 14 | .563 |
| No. 16 Iowa † | 12 | – | 8 | .600 | 26 | – | 10 | .722 |
| Ohio State | 12 | – | 8 | .600 | 20 | – | 12 | .625 |
| Michigan State | 11 | – | 9 | .550 | 23 | – | 13 | .639 |
| Michigan | 11 | – | 9 | .550 | 19 | – | 15 | .559 |
| Indiana | 9 | – | 11 | .450 | 21 | – | 14 | .600 |
| Maryland | 7 | – | 13 | .350 | 15 | – | 17 | .469 |
| Penn State | 7 | – | 13 | .350 | 14 | – | 17 | .452 |
| Northwestern | 7 | – | 13 | .350 | 15 | – | 16 | .484 |
| Nebraska | 4 | – | 16 | .200 | 10 | – | 22 | .313 |
| Minnesota | 4 | – | 16 | .200 | 13 | – | 17 | .433 |
† Conference tournament winner Rankings from AP poll

The 2021–22 Minnesota Golden Gophers men's basketball team represented the University of Minnesota in the 2021–22 NCAA Division I men's basketball season. The Gophers were led by first-year head coach Ben Johnson and played their home games at Williams Arena in Minneapolis, Minnesota as members of the Big Ten Conference. They finished the season 13–17, 4–16 in Big Ten play to finish in a tie for last place. As the No. 14 seed in the Big Ten tournament, they lost to Penn State in the first round.

== Previous season ==
In a season that was restricted by the ongoing COVID-19 pandemic, the Gophers concluded the 2020–21 season with a record of 14-15, including a 6-14 performance in Big Ten play that landed them in 13th place. They managed to secure a victory against Northwestern in the opening round of the Big Ten tournament, but unfortunately suffered a defeat at the hands of Ohio State in the subsequent round.

After the conclusion of the season, the school made the decision to terminate the employment of head coach Richard Pitino following his tenure of eight years at the institution. On March 23, 2021, the school officially announced the appointment of Minnesota alumni and former assistant coach Ben Johnson as the new head coach. On March 23, 2021, the school named Minnesota alum and former Minnesota assistant coach Ben Johnson the new head coach.

== Offseason ==
=== Departures ===
| Name | Number | Pos. | Height | Weight | Year | Hometown | Reason for departure |
|---|---|---|---|---|---|---|---|
| Liam Robbins | 0 | C | 7'0" | 235 | Junior | Davenport, IA | Transferred to Vanderbilt |
| Tre' Williams | 1 | G | 6'5" | 195 | Sophomore | Dallas, TX | Transferred to Oregon State |
| Martice Mitchell | 2 | F | 6'10" | 190 | Freshman | Chicago, IL | Transferred to Northern Illinois |
| Jamal Mashburn Jr. | 4 | G | 6'2" | 175 | Freshman | Miami, FL | Transferred to New Mexico |
| Marcus Carr | 5 | G | 6'2" | 195 | RS Junior | Toronto, ON | Graduate transferred to Texas |
| Both Gach | 11 | G | 6'6" | 185 | Junior | Austin, MN | Transferred to Utah |
| Hunt Conroy | 13 | G | 5'10" | 165 | Senior | New Orleans, LA | Walk-on; graduated |
| Jarvis Omersa | 21 | F | 6'6" | 235 | Junior | Orono, MN | Transferred to St. Thomas |
| Gabe Kalscheur | 22 | G | 6'4" | 200 | Junior | Edina, MN | Transferred to Iowa State |
| Brandon Johnson | 23 | F | 6'8" | 220 | RS Senior | Chicago, IL | Graduate transferred to DePaul |
| Sam Freeman | 32 | C | 6'10" | 240 | Sophomore | Dallas, TX | Transferred to Pacific |

=== Incoming transfers ===
| Name | Number | Pos. | Height | Weight | Year | Hometown | Previous School |
|---|---|---|---|---|---|---|---|
| Payton Willis | 0 | G | 6'4" | 200 | Graduate Student | Fayetteville, AR | College of Charleston |
| Abdoulaye Thiam | 2 | G | 6'3" | 180 | Sophomore | Orlando, FL | Indian River State College |
| Joey Kern | 3 | G | 6'1" | 170 | Graduate Student | Norwalk, IA | Johns Hopkins |
| Jamison Battle | 10 | F | 6'7" | 225 | Junior | Robbinsdale, MN | George Washington |
| Luke Loewe | 12 | G | 6'4' | 185 | Graduate Student | Fond du Lac, WI | William & Mary |
| Charlie Daniels | 15 | F | 6'9" | 230 | Graduate Student | Jacksonville, FL | Stephen F. Austin |
| Eylijah Stephens | 20 | G | 6'3" | 175 | Graduate Student | Plantation, FL | Lafayette |
| Danny Ogele | 22 | F | 6'7" | 220 | Graduate Student | Chicago, IL | Mercyhurst |
| Parker Fox | 23 | F | 6'8" | 210 | RS Senior | Mahtomedi, MN | Northern State |
| Sean Sutherlin | 24 | G | 6'5" | 200 | RS Senior | New Brighton, MN | New Hampshire |
| Will Ramberg | 25 | G | 6'5" | 195 | Junior | Grand Marais, MN | McGill |

=== Recruiting classes ===
==== 2021 recruiting class ====
College recruiting
| Name | Hometown | School | Height | Weight | Commit date |
|---|---|---|---|---|---|
| Treyton Thompson; PF | Alexandria, Minnesota | La Lumiere School | 6 ft 11 in (2.11 m) | 190 lb (86 kg) | Nov 30, 2019 |
| Treyton Thompson; PF | Recruit ratings: Rivals: 247Sports: | | | | |
Overall recruit ranking:
Note: In many cases, Scout, Rivals, 247Sports, On3, and ESPN may conflict in their listings of height and weight.; In these cases, the average was taken. ESPN grades are on a 100-point scale.; Sources: "2021 Team Ranking". Rivals.

==== 2022 Recruiting class ====
College recruiting (2022)
| Name | Hometown | School | Height | Weight | Commit date |
|---|---|---|---|---|---|
| Braeden Carrington; SG | Brooklyn Park, MN | Park Center High School | 6 ft 3 in (1.91 m) | 170 lb (77 kg) | Aug 4, 2021 |
| Braeden Carrington; SG | Recruit ratings: Rivals: | | | | |
| Pharrel Payne; PF | Cottage Grove, MN | Park Senior High School | 6 ft 9 in (2.06 m) | 230 lb (100 kg) | Aug 22, 2021 |
| Pharrel Payne; PF | Recruit ratings: Rivals: | | | | |
| Joshua Ola-Joseph; SF | Osseo, MN | Osseo Senior High School | 6 ft 6 in (1.98 m) | 200 lb (91 kg) | Aug 30, 2021 |
| Joshua Ola-Joseph; SF | Recruit ratings: Rivals: | | | | |
Overall recruit ranking:
Note: In many cases, Scout, Rivals, 247Sports, On3, and ESPN may conflict in their listings of height and weight.; In these cases, the average was taken. ESPN grades are on a 100-point scale.; Sources: "2022 Team Ranking". Rivals.

== Roster ==
2021–22 Minnesota Golden Gophers men's basketball team
Players
Coaches

| Pos. | # | Name | Height | Weight | Year | Previous school | Hometown |
|---|---|---|---|---|---|---|---|
| G | 0 | Payton Willis | 6 ft 4 in (1.93 m) | 200 lb (91 kg) | GS | Fayetteville; College of Charleston | Fayetteville, AR |
| F | 1 | Eric Curry (C) | 6 ft 9 in (2.06 m) | 240 lb (109 kg) | RS Sr | Southwest Christian Academy | Memphis, TN |
| G | 2 | Abdoulaye Thiam | 6 ft 3 in (1.91 m) | 180 lb (82 kg) | Fr | Dr. Phillips; Indian River State College | Orlando, FL |
| G | 3 | Joey Kern (W) | 6 ft 1 in (1.85 m) | 170 lb (77 kg) | GS | Dowling Catholic; Johns Hopkins | Norwalk, IA |
| F | 5 | Isaiah Ihnen | 6 ft 9 in (2.06 m) | 220 lb (100 kg) | Jr | IBA Munich | Böblingen, Germany |
| F | 10 | Jamison Battle | 6 ft 7 in (2.01 m) | 225 lb (102 kg) | So | DeLaSalle High School; George Washington | Robbinsdale, MN |
| G | 11 | Jackson Purcell (W) | 6 ft 5 in (1.96 m) | 175 lb (79 kg) | Fr | Eastview | Apple Valley, MN |
| G | 12 | Luke Loewe | 6 ft 4 in (1.93 m) | 185 lb (84 kg) | GS | Fond du Lac; William & Mary | Fond du Lac, WI |
| F/C | 15 | Charlie Daniels | 6 ft 9 in (2.06 m) | 230 lb (104 kg) | GS | The Potter's House Christian Academy; Stephen F. Austin | Jacksonville, FL |
| G | 20 | Eylijah Stephens | 6 ft 3 in (1.91 m) | 175 lb (79 kg) | GS | St. Thomas Aquinas; Lafayette | Plantation, FL |
| F | 22 | Danny Ogele | 6 ft 7 in (2.01 m) | 220 lb (100 kg) | GS | St. Ignatius College Prep; Mercyhurst | Chicago, IL |
| F | 23 | Parker Fox | 6 ft 8 in (2.03 m) | 210 lb (95 kg) | RS Jr | Mahtomedi; Northern State | Mahtomedi, MN |
| G | 24 | Sean Sutherlin | 6 ft 5 in (1.96 m) | 200 lb (91 kg) | RS Sr | Irondale HS; New Hampshire | New Brighton, MN |
| G | 25 | Will Ramberg | 6 ft 5 in (1.96 m) | 195 lb (88 kg) | So | DeLaSalle High School; McGill | Grand Marais, MN |
| C | 42 | Treyton Thompson | 6 ft 11 in (2.11 m) | 190 lb (86 kg) | Fr | La Lumiere School | Glenwood, MN |

Head coach

- Ben Johnson (Minnesota)

Assistant coach(es)

- Dave Thorson (Hamline)
- Jason Kemp (UW–La Crosse)
- Marcus Jenkins (Air Force)

Legend

- (C) Team captain
- (S) Suspended
- (I) Ineligible
- (W) Walk-on
- Injured
- Current redshirt

Roster

== Schedule and results ==
| Date time, TV | Rank^{#} | Opponent^{#} | Result | Record | High points | High rebounds | High assists | Site (attendance) city, state |
Exhibition
| November 1, 2021*; 7:00 p.m., BTN+ | | Concordia–St. Paul | W 80–67 | | 24 – Battle | 8 – Battle | 5 – Willis | Williams Arena (9,470); Minneapolis, MN |
Regular season
| November 9, 2021*; 7:00 p.m., BTN+ | | Kansas City | W 71–56 | 1–0 | 18 – Battle | 7 – Curry | 6 – Willis | Williams Arena (8,975); Minneapolis, MN |
| November 12, 2021*; 5:30 p.m., ESPNU | | vs. Western Kentucky; Asheville Championship semifinals | W 73–69 | 2–0 | 20 – Battle | 7 – Curry | 5 – Loewe | Harrah's Cherokee Center; Asheville, NC |
| November 14, 2021*; 6:30 p.m., ESPN2 | | vs. Princeton; Asheville Championship final | W 87–80 ^{2OT} | 3–0 | 29 – Willis | 11 – Battle | 2 – Tied | Harrah's Cherokee Center; Asheville, NC |
| November 19, 2021*; 6:00 p.m., BTN+ | | Purdue Fort Wayne | W 78–49 | 4–0 | 19 – Sutherlin | 7 – Sutherlin | 5 – Tied | Williams Arena (9,451); Minneapolis, MN |
| November 24, 2021*; 8:00 p.m., BTN | | Jacksonville | W 55–44 | 5–0 | 17 – Willis | 8 – Curry | 3 – Tied | Williams Arena (9,250); Minneapolis, MN |
| November 30, 2021*; 6:00 p.m., ESPNU | | at Pittsburgh; ACC–Big Ten Challenge | W 54–53 | 6–0 | 16 – Battle | 7 – Battle | 3 – Tied | Petersen Events Center (7,736); Pittsburgh, PA |
| December 5, 2021*; 1:00 p.m., ESPNU | | at Mississippi State | W 81–76 | 7–0 | 24 – Willis | 5 – Tied | 7 – Willis | Humphrey Coliseum (6,965); Starkville, MS |
| December 8, 2021; 8:00 p.m., BTN | | No. 19 Michigan State | L 67–75 | 7–1 (0–1) | 18 – Curry | 8 – Battle | 5 – Willis | Williams Arena (11,178); Minneapolis, MN |
| December 11, 2021; 5:30 p.m., FS1 | | at Michigan | W 75–65 | 8–1 (1–1) | 27 – Battle | 7 – Battle | 1 – Tied | Crisler Center (12,461); Ann Arbor, MI |
| December 14, 2021*; 7:00 p.m., BTN | | Texas A&M–Corpus Christi | W 79–71 | 9–1 | 17 – Willis | 12 – Curry | 5 – Loewe | Williams Arena (9,001); Minneapolis, MN |
| December 22, 2021*; 7:00 p.m., BTN | | Green Bay | W 72–56 | 10–1 | 23 – Battle | 10 – Curry | 10 – Willis | Williams Arena (10,302); Minneapolis, MN |
| December 29, 2021*; 7:00 p.m., BTN+ | | Alcorn State | Canceled due to COVID-19 issues at Alcorn State | | | | | Williams Arena; Minneapolis, MN |
| January 4, 2022; 6:00 p.m., FS1 | | Illinois | L 53–76 | 10–2 (1–2) | 10 – Tied | 5 – Tied | 4 – Stephens | Williams Arena (10,112); Minneapolis, MN |
| January 9, 2022; 11:00 a.m., BTN | | at Indiana | L 60–73 | 10–3 (1–3) | 19 – Battle | 8 – Curry | 4 – Loewe | Simon Skjodt Assembly Hall (17,222); Bloomington, IN |
| January 12, 2022; 6:00 p.m., BTN | | at No. 10 Michigan State | L 69–71 | 10–4 (1–4) | 19 – Curry | 7 – Tied | 4 – Stephens | Breslin Center (14,797); East Lansing, MI |
| January 16, 2022; 1:00 p.m., BTN | | Iowa | L 71–81 | 10–5 (1–5) | 22 – Stephens | 8 – Battle | 4 – Willis | Williams Arena (10,925); Minneapolis, MN |
| January 22, 2022; 11:00 a.m., BTN | | Rutgers | W 68–65 | 11–5 (2–5) | 32 – Willis | 6 – Tied | 7 – Willis | Williams Arena (10,794); Minneapolis, MN |
| January 27, 2022; 7:00 p.m., ESPN | | No. 16 Ohio State | L 64–75 | 11–6 (2–6) | 15 – Battle | 6 – Battle | 7 – Willis | Williams Arena (10,179); Minneapolis, MN |
| January 30, 2022; 12:00 p.m., BTN | | at No. 11 Wisconsin | L 60–66 | 11–7 (2–7) | 17 – Willis | 10 – Battle | 2 – Willis | Kohl Center (17,287); Madison, WI |
| February 2, 2022; 6:00 p.m., BTN | | No. 4 Purdue | L 73–88 | 11–8 (2–8) | 24 – Willis | 5 – Willis | 10 – Willis | Williams Arena (9,975); Minneapolis, MN |
| February 6, 2022; 3:30 p.m., BTN | | at Iowa | L 59–71 | 11–9 (2–9) | 19 – Loewe | 8 – Willis | 3 – Tied | Carver–Hawkeye Arena (14,558); Iowa City, IA |
| February 9, 2022; 8:00 p.m., BTN | | at Nebraska | L 65–78 | 11–10 (2–10) | 21 – Battle | 10 – Battle | 6 – Willis | Pinnacle Bank Arena (15,303); Lincoln, NE |
| February 12, 2022; 7:30 p.m., BTN | | Penn State | W 76–70 | 12–10 (3–10) | 22 – Curry | 6 – Willis | 10 – Willis | Williams Arena (9,948); Minneapolis, MN |
| February 15, 2022; 7:30 p.m., BTN | | at No. 18 Ohio State | L 45–70 | 12–11 (3–11) | 12 – Loewe | 7 – Willis | 3 – Curry | Value City Arena (12,360); Columbus, OH |
| February 17, 2022; 7:30 p.m., BTN | | at Penn State; Rescheduled from January 19 | L 46–67 | 12–12 (3–12) | 16 – Battle | 7 – Sutherlin | 2 – Tied | Bryce Jordan Center (7,726); University Park, PA |
| February 19, 2022; 3:00 p.m., BTN | | Northwestern | W 77–60 | 13–12 (4–12) | 24 – Loewe | 14 – Battle | 7 – Loewe | Williams Arena (10,570); Minneapolis, MN |
| February 23, 2022; 8:00 p.m., BTN | | No. 13 Wisconsin | L 67–68 | 13–13 (4–13) | 17 – Battle | 5 – Curry | 6 – Willis | Williams Arena (11,761); Minneapolis, MN |
| February 27, 2022; 5:00 p.m., ESPN2 | | Indiana | L 79–84 | 13–14 (4–14) | 28 – Willis | 7 – Tied | 7 – Willis | Williams Arena (11,585); Minneapolis, MN |
| March 2, 2022; 8:00 p.m., BTN | | at Maryland | L 73–84 | 13–15 (4–15) | 39 – Battle | 8 – Stephens | 2 – Tied | Xfinity Center (13,015); College Park, MD |
| March 6, 2022; 6:30 p.m., BTN | | at Northwestern | L 62–75 | 13–16 (4–16) | 20 – Battle | 8 – Willis | 7 – Willis | Welsh–Ryan Arena (4,551); Evanston, IL |
Big Ten tournament
| March 9, 2022; 7:30 p.m., BTN | (14) | vs. (11) Penn State; First round | L 51–60 | 13–17 | 19 – Battle | 6 – Tied | 6 – Curry | Gainbridge Fieldhouse; Indianapolis, IN |
*Non-conference game. ^{#}Rankings from AP Poll. (#) Tournament seedings in parentheses. All times are in Central Time.

== Rankings ==
Ranking movements Legend: ██ Increase in ranking ██ Decrease in ranking — = Not ranked RV = Received votes
| | Week | | | | | | | | | | | | | | | | | | | |
| Poll | Pre | 1 | 2 | 3 | 4 | 5 | 6 | 7 | 8 | 9 | 10 | 11 | 12 | 13 | 14 | 15 | 16 | 17 | 18 | Final |
|---|---|---|---|---|---|---|---|---|---|---|---|---|---|---|---|---|---|---|---|---|
| AP | — | — | — | — | — | RV | RV | RV | RV | — | — | — | — | — | — | — | — | — | | Not released |
| Coaches | — | — | — | — | RV | RV | RV | RV | RV | — | — | — | — | — | — | — | — | — | | |

*AP does not release post-NCAA Tournament rankings
^Coaches did not release a Week 1 poll.
