= Jalen Pickett =

American basketball player (born 1999)

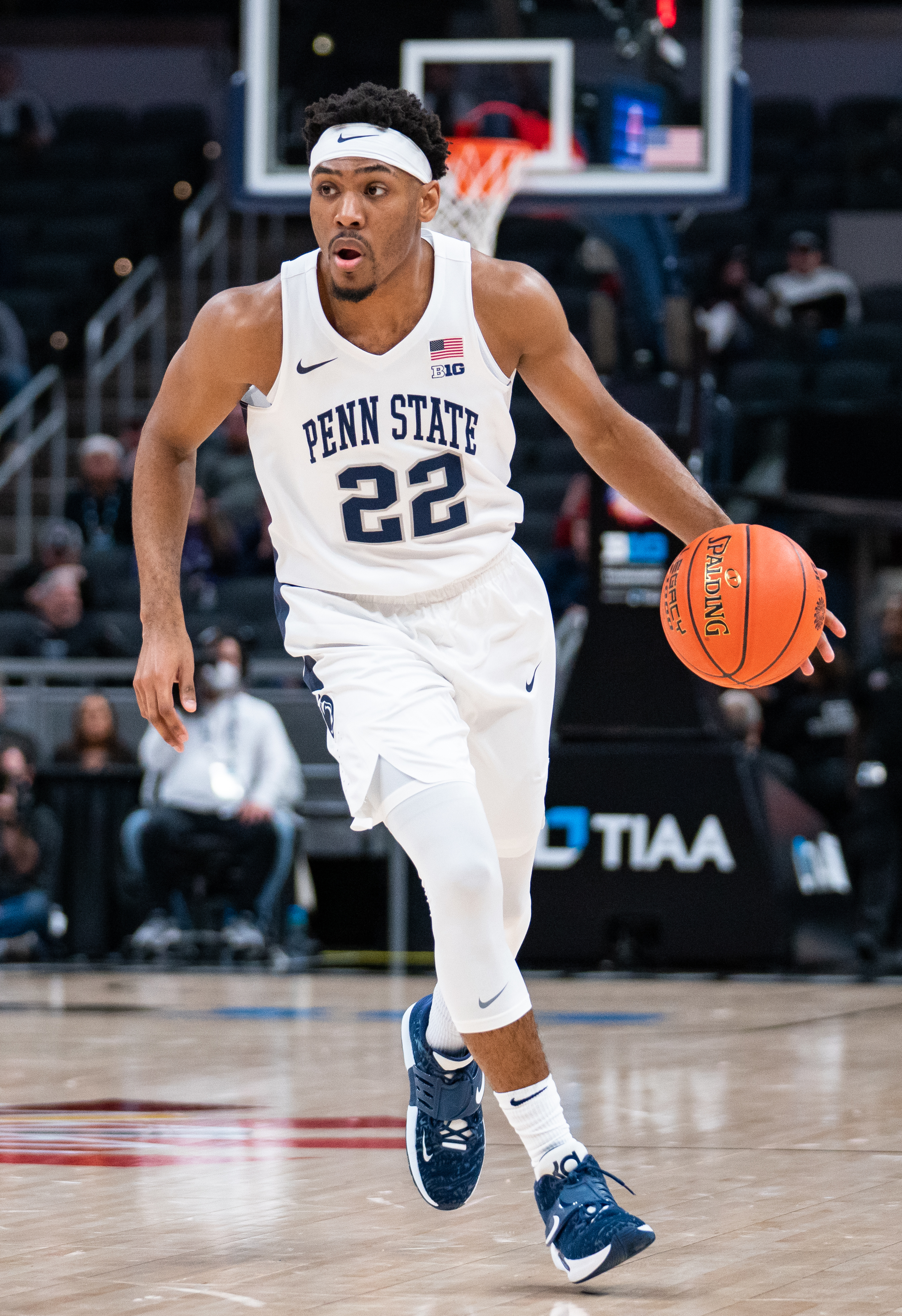
- Pickett with Penn State in 2022

No. 21 – Los Angeles Clippers
- Position: Point guard
- League: NBA

Personal information
- Born: October 22, 1999 (age 27) Rochester, New York, U.S.
- Listed height: 6 ft 2 in (1.88 m)
- Listed weight: 202 lb (92 kg)

Career information
- High school: Aquinas Institute (Rochester, New York); SPIRE Academy (Geneva, Ohio)
- College: Siena (2018–2021); Penn State (2021–2023)
- NBA draft: 2023: 2nd round, 32nd overall pick
- Drafted by: Indiana Pacers
- Playing career: 2023–present

Career history
- 2023–2026: Denver Nuggets
- 2023–2024: →Grand Rapids Gold
- 2026–present: Los Angeles Clippers
- 2026–present: →San Diego Clippers

Career highlights
- Consensus second-team All-American (2023); First-team All-Big Ten (2023); MAAC Player of the Year (2020); 3× First-team All-MAAC (2019–2021); MAAC Rookie of the Year (2019)
- Stats at NBA.com
- Stats at Basketball Reference

Jalen Maurice Pickett (born October 22, 1999) is an American professional basketball player for the Los Angeles Clippers of the National Basketball Association (NBA), on a two-way contract with the San Diego Clippers He played college basketball for the Siena Saints and the Penn State Nittany Lions. He is a graduate of SPIRE Institute and Academy, an Olympic training center in Geneva, Ohio.

== High school career ==
Pickett played high school basketball for the Aquinas Institute in Rochester, New York. In his junior season, he led his team to a New York State Public High School Athletic Association (NYSPHSAA) Class AA championship while earning most valuable player (MVP) honors. As a senior, Pickett averaged 20 points and 10 rebounds per game, reaching the Class AA Federation Final. He played for the Albany-based program City Rocks on the Amateur Athletic Union (AAU) circuit and was teammates with five-star recruit Isaiah Stewart. Playing for the City Rocks, Pickett led the Nike Elite Youth Basketball League in player efficiency. For academic reasons, he completed a postgraduate year, during which he played for SPIRE Institute in Geneva, Ohio. Pickett averaged 14 points, 6.3 rebounds, 4.6 assists and 2.1 steals per game. He became academically eligible to play in the National Collegiate Athletic Association (NCAA). Pickett was considered a three-star recruit by Rivals and received few offers from NCAA Division I programs. He committed to Siena to play for first-year head coach Jamion Christian.

== College career ==
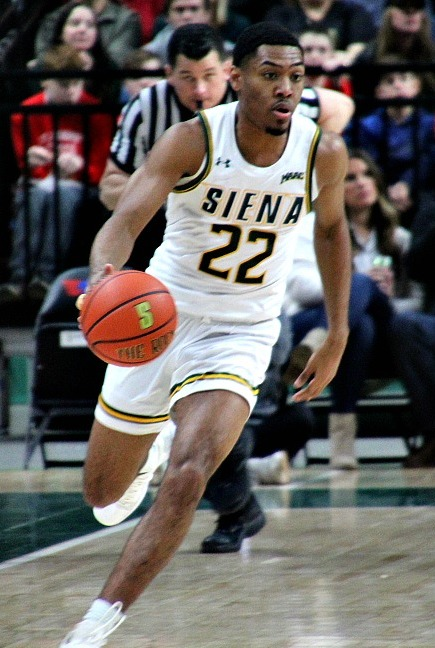
Jalen Pickett with the Siena Saints in 2019

On February 17, 2019, Pickett, in his first year at Siena, had a career-high 46 points and 13 assists in a 107–100 triple-overtime loss to Quinnipiac. He was named Metro Atlantic Athletic Conference (MAAC) Rookie of the Week 11 times, a league record. As a freshman, Pickett averaged 15.8 points, 4.6 rebounds, 2.1 steals and 6.7 assists per game, which ranked ninth nationally. Pickett was named First-team All-MAAC and MAAC Rookie of the Year. After the season he declared for the 2019 NBA draft and participated in the G League Elite Camp but ultimately decided to return to Siena.

Pickett missed a game against Colgate on November 30, 2019, for a violation of team rules. On February 14, 2020, he scored a season-high 27 points in a 73–64 win over Rider. At the close of the 2019–20 regular season, Pickett was named the MAAC Player of the Year. He helped the team win the MAAC regular-season championship, averaging 15.1 points and a league-leading 6 assists per game while shooting 37.4 percent from three-point range. As a junior, Pickett was limited by a hamstring injury and multiple COVID-19 pauses, averaging 12.9 points, 6.3 rebounds and 4.8 assists per game. He earned First Team All-MAAC honors for his third consecutive season.

On April 25, 2021, Pickett announced that he would transfer to Penn State, choosing the Nittany Lions over Oregon State. He averaged 13.3 points, 4.3 rebounds, 4.4 assists and 1.1 steals per game. Pickett announced he would return for his final season of eligibility.

On February 14, 2023, Pickett scored a career-high 41 points in a 93–81 victory over Illinois, becoming Penn State's first 40-point scorer since 1961 and setting a Bryce Jordan Center record. He also became the fourth Penn State player to score 2,000 points. Pickett followed up his historic performance with a 32-point performance against Minnesota on February 18, 2023. His combined two-game totals of 73 points, 16 assists and 11 rebounds earned him multiple national player-of-the-week honors. The two-game stat line was also only the third time over the last 25 seasons in NCAA Division I basketball or the NBA where a player scored 70-plus points, had 15-plus assists and 10-plus rebounds with a 65% field goal accuracy and 90% free-throw rate. The other two players to accomplish this feat were LeBron James (2017) and Stephen Curry (2022).

== Professional career ==
The Indiana Pacers selected Pickett with the 32nd overall pick in the 2023 NBA draft and subsequently traded his draft rights to the Denver Nuggets. With the selection, Pickett became the highest-drafted former Siena Saint, and he and Seth Lundy were the first pair of Penn State Nittany Lions teammates to be selected in the same NBA draft. On July 6, 2023, the Denver Nuggets announced that they had signed with Pickett.

On April 2, 2025, Pickett recorded his first career triple-double, with 17 points, 11 rebounds and 10 assists in a 113–106 loss against the San Antonio Spurs in his second career start.

On January 5, 2026, Pickett recorded a career-high 29 points on a career-high seven three-pointers made, along with five rebounds and seven assists in a 125–124 overtime win over the Philadelphia 76ers. In June 2026, the Nuggets declined Pickett's fourth-year option for the 2026-27 season, making him a free agent.

== Career statistics ==
Legend
GP	Games played	GS	Games started	MPG	Minutes per game
FG%	Field goal percentage	3P%	3-point field goal percentage	FT%	Free throw percentage
RPG	Rebounds per game	APG	Assists per game	SPG	Steals per game
BPG	Blocks per game	PPG	Points per game	**Bold**	Career high

=== NBA ===
==== Regular season ====
Year	Team	GP	GS	MPG	FG%	3P%	FT%	RPG	APG	SPG	BPG	PPG
2023–24	Denver	27	0	4.5	**.429**	.360	.750	.5	.8	.1	.0	1.6
2024–25	Denver	49	4	13.6	.428	**.396**	.750	1.4	2.2	**.4**	**.1**	4.1
2025–26	Denver	**50**	**18**	**16.1**	.422	.386	**.789**	**2.3**	**2.3**	.3	**.1**	**5.2**
Career		126	22	12.7	.425	.387	.774	1.6	1.9	.3	.1	4.0

==== Playoffs ====
Year	Team	GP	GS	MPG	FG%	3P%	FT%	RPG	APG	SPG	BPG	PPG
2024	Denver	3	0	3.6	**.667**	.000	—	.3	.3	.0	**.3**	1.3
2025	Denver	**8**	0	**7.1**	.333	**.333**	—	**.9**	**.6**	.0	.1	**1.6**
2026	Denver	2	0	2.0	—	—	.500	.0	.5	.0	.0	.5
Career		13	0	5.5	.389	.300	.500	.6	.5	.0	.2	1.4

=== College ===
Year	Team	GP	GS	MPG	FG%	3P%	FT%	RPG	APG	SPG	BPG	PPG
2018–19	Siena	33	32	37.1	.436	.348	.746	4.6	6.7	**2.0**	0.9	15.8
2019–20	Siena	29	28	37.0	.458	.374	.689	4.6	6.0	1.0	**1.1**	15.1
2020–21	Siena	14	14	36.1	.403	.359	.750	6.3	4.8	0.9	**1.1**	12.9
**Career (Siena)**		**76**	**74**	**36.9**	**.439**	**.360**	**.730**	**4.9**	**6.1**	**1.4**	**1.0**	**15.0**
2021–22	Penn State	31	31	**37.2**	.420	.320	.746	4.3	4.4	1.1	0.6	13.3
2022–23	Penn State	**36**	**36**	36.5	**.511**	**.385**	**.774**	**7.3**	**6.7**	0.9	0.5	**17.9**
**Career (Penn State)**		**67**	**67**	**36.9**	**.466**	**.353**	**.760**	**5.8**	**5.6**	**1.0**	**0.6**	**15.6**
