= Aki Collins =

American basketball coach

David "Aki" Collins is an American basketball coach. Collins currently serves as the director of recruiting for Overtime Elite.

== Biography ==
Collins is originally from Brooklyn and is a 1997 graduate of Clark Atlanta University. Collins served as an assistant coach at University of Colorado (1997-2000), Howard University (2000-2003), Marshall University (2003-2006) and Fairfield University (2006-2008) before accepting a position at Marquette under Buzz Williams. While at Marquette, Collins gained a reputation as a excellent recruiter, assisting the Golden Eagles to two top-25 ranked recruiting classes during his tenure.

On May 27, 2012, Collins accepted an assistant coach position at the University of Memphis. In Collins' first few months with the program, he helped the Tigers secure the commitment of highly ranked frontcourt player Kuran Iverson.

Collins is back to coaching under Buzz Williams at the University of Maryland as Assistant Coach/Director of Player Personnel.
