= Miller Kopp =

American basketball player (born 1998)

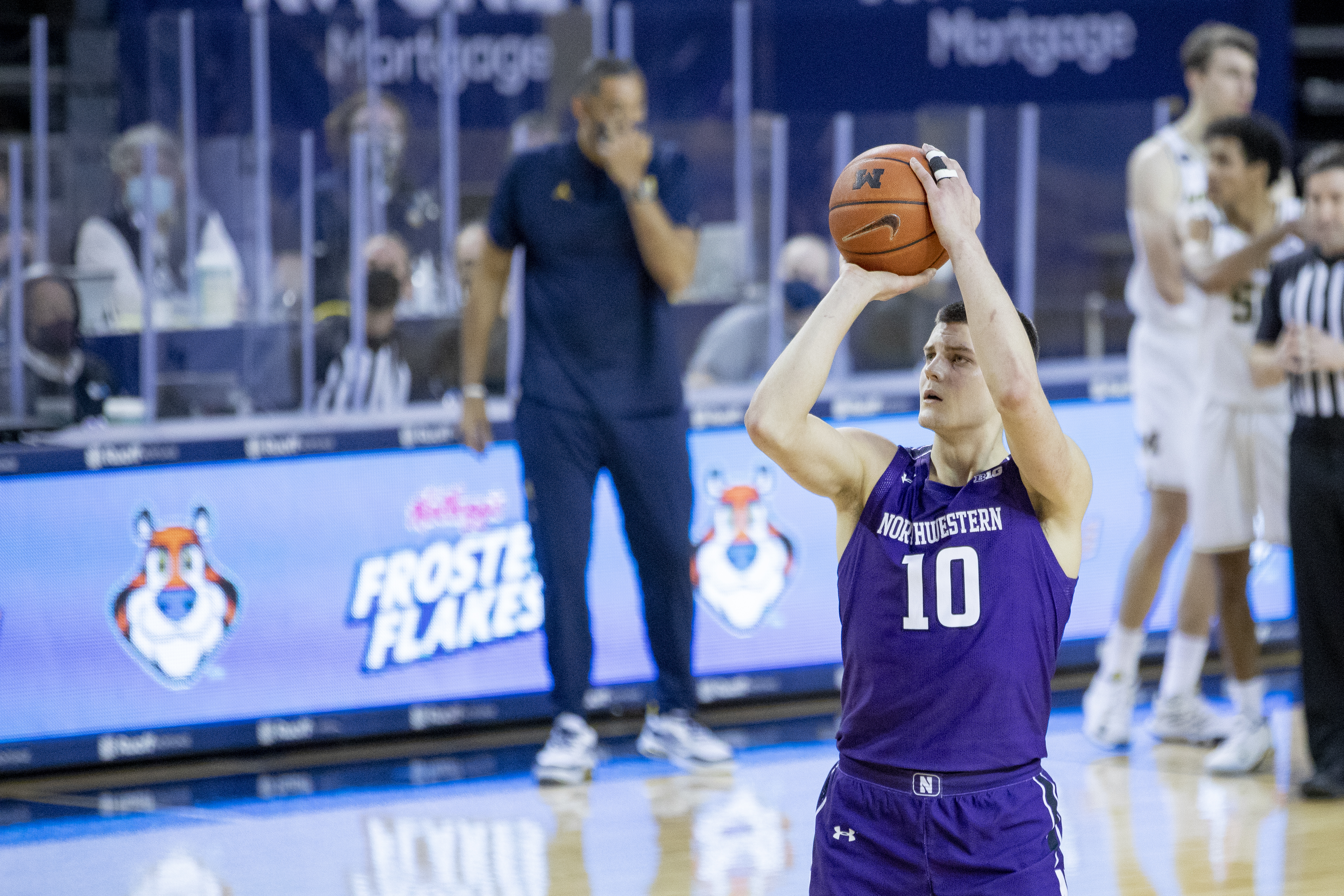
- Kopp with Northwestern in January 2021

Élan Chalon
- Position: Small forward
- League: LNB Élite

Personal information
- Born: November 24, 1998 (age 27) Houston, Texas, U.S.
- Listed height: 6 ft 7 in (2.01 m)
- Listed weight: 220 lb (100 kg)

Career information
- High school: Houston Christian (Houston, Texas)
- College: Northwestern (2018–2021); Indiana (2021–2023)
- NBA draft: 2023: undrafted
- Playing career: 2023–present

Career history
- 2023–2025: Oklahoma City Blue
- 2025–2026: Cleveland Charge
- 2026: Vancouver Bandits
- 2026–present: Élan Chalon

Career highlights
- NBA G League champion (2024)
- Stats at NBA.com
- Stats at Basketball Reference

Miller Dudley Kopp (born November 24, 1998) is an American professional basketball player for Élan Chalon of the French LNB Élite. He played college basketball for the Northwestern Wildcats and the Indiana Hoosiers.

== High school career ==
Kopp attended Houston Christian at Houston, Texas, where he averaged 24 points and 11 rebounds in his junior year.

== College career ==
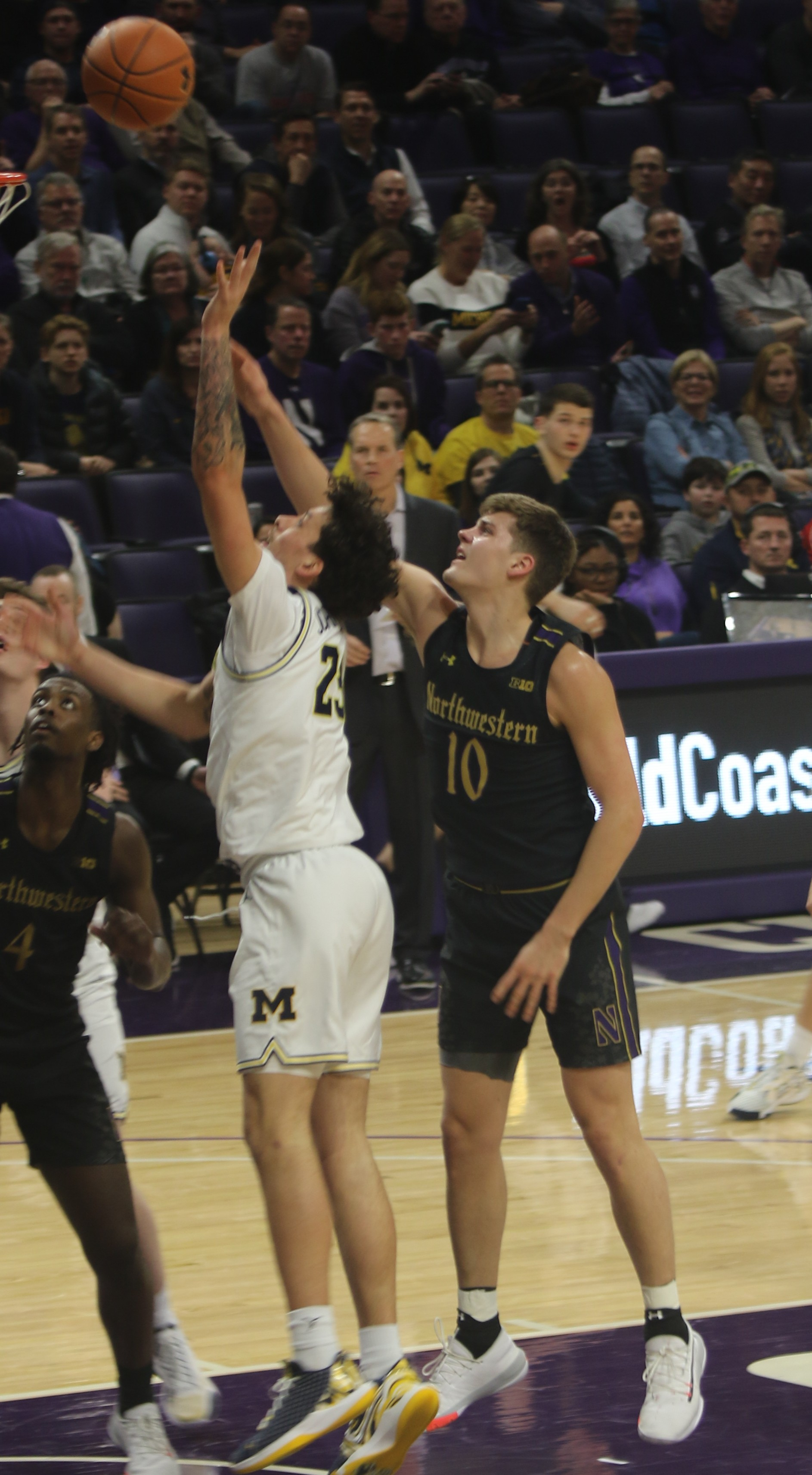
Kopp (#10) reaching for the basketball for Northwestern against Michigan on February 12, 2020

Kopp began playing college basketball at Northwestern, where he played three seasons, averaging 13.1 points as a junior.

In his senior season, Kopp transferred to Indiana, starting 70 games across two seasons while helping the Hoosiers appear in two NCAA Tournaments. In his first season, he averaged 6.0 points while shooting 36.1 percent from 3-point range and in his final one, he improved to 8.1 points per game on 44.4 percent 3-point shooting.

== Professional career ==
After going undrafted in the 2023 NBA draft, Kopp signed with Limoges CSP on August 7, 2023, but he didn't play for them. On October 31, he joined the Oklahoma City Blue, making 41 appearances while averaging 8.3 points, 2.9 rebounds and 0.9 assists in 20.4 minutes, helping the Blue win the NBA G League title.

On October 8, 2024, Kopp signed with the Oklahoma City Thunder, but was waived three days later. On October 25, he re-joined the Oklahoma City Blue.

On September 26, 2025, Kopp signed an Exhibit 10 contract with the Cleveland Cavaliers, but was waived on October 13, 2025 He was added to the training camp roster of the Cavs' NBA G League affiliate, the Cleveland Charge.

On April 9, 2026, Kopp signed with Vancouver Bandits of the Canadian Elite Basketball League (CEBL).

== Personal life ==
The son of Will, who played tennis collegiately at Chattanooga, and Deborah Kopp, he has three brothers, Braden, Anderson and Maddox. He majored in communications.
