= 2020–21 Penn State Nittany Lions basketball team =

American college basketball season

2020–21 Penn State Nittany Lions basketball
- Conference: Big Ten Conference
- Record: 11–14 (7–12 Big Ten)
- Head coach: Jim Ferry (interim)
- Associate head coach: Keith Urgo
- Assistant coaches: Ross Condon; Talor Battle
- Home arena: Bryce Jordan Center

2020–21 Big Ten Conference men's basketball standings
	Conf.				Overall
Team	W		L	PCT	W		L	PCT
No. 4 Michigan	14	–	3	.824	23	–	5	.821
No. 2 Illinois †	16	–	4	.800	24	–	7	.774
No. 8 Iowa	14	–	6	.700	22	–	9	.710
No. 20 Purdue	13	–	6	.684	18	–	10	.643
No. 7 Ohio State	12	–	8	.600	21	–	10	.677
Wisconsin	10	–	10	.500	18	–	13	.581
Rutgers	10	–	10	.500	16	–	12	.571
Maryland	9	–	11	.450	17	–	14	.548
Michigan State	9	–	11	.450	15	–	13	.536
Indiana	7	–	12	.368	12	–	15	.444
Penn State	7	–	12	.368	11	–	14	.440
Northwestern	6	–	13	.316	9	–	15	.375
Minnesota	6	–	14	.300	14	–	15	.483
Nebraska	3	–	16	.158	7	–	20	.259
† Conference tournament winner Rankings from AP poll

The 2020–21 Penn State Nittany Lions basketball team represented Pennsylvania State University in the 2020–21 NCAA Division I men's basketball season. They were led by interim head coach Jim Ferry and played their home games at the Bryce Jordan Center in University Park, Pennsylvania as members of the Big Ten Conference. They finished the season 11–14, 7–12 in Big Ten play to finish in a tie for 10th place. As the No. 10 seed in the Big Ten tournament, they defeated Nebraska before losing to Wisconsin in the second round.

On October 21, 2020, head coach Pat Chambers resigned after an internal investigation by the school into inappropriate conduct by Chambers. It had been reported in July that former player Rasir Bolton had left the program due to inappropriate comments to him by Chambers. New allegations surfaced after a later investigation by the school that led to Chambers resigning. Assistant coach Jim Ferry was named interim coach for the season.

Following the end of the season, the school hired Purdue assistant coach Micah Shrewsberry as head coach.

== Previous season ==
The Nittany Lions finished the 2019–20 season 21–10, 11–9 in Big Ten play to finish in a four-way tie for fifth place. Their season ended following the cancellation of postseason tournaments due to the coronavirus pandemic.

== Offseason ==
=== Recruiting class ===
College recruiting information
Name	Hometown	School	Height	Weight	Commit date
Dallion Johnson; SG	Haverhill, MA	Phillips Academy	6 ft 2 in (1.88 m)	170 lb (77 kg)	Jul 15, 2019
Dallion Johnson; SG	Recruit ratings: Scout: Rivals: 247Sports: ESPN:				
Overall recruit ranking:
Note: In many cases, Scout, Rivals, 247Sports, On3, and ESPN may conflict in their listings of height and weight.; In these cases, the average was taken. ESPN grades are on a 100-point scale.; Sources: "2020 Team Ranking". Rivals.

== Roster ==
2020–21 Penn State Nittany Lions men's basketball team
Players
Coaches

Pos.	#	Name	Height	Weight	Year	Previous school	Hometown
G	0	Myreon Jones	6 ft 3 in (1.91 m)	180 lb (82 kg)	Jr	Lincoln Academy (GA)	Birmingham, Alabama
F	1	Seth Lundy	6 ft 6 in (1.98 m)	219 lb (99 kg)	So	Roman Catholic High School	Paulsboro, New Jersey
G	2	Myles Dread	6 ft 4 in (1.93 m)	220 lb (100 kg)	Jr	Gonzaga College High School	Detroit, Michigan
G	3	Sam Sessoms	6 ft 0 in (1.83 m)	187 lb (85 kg)	Jr	Binghamton	Philadelphia, Pennsylvania
F	4	Caleb Dorsey	6 ft 7 in (2.01 m)	230 lb (104 kg)	Fr	The Hill School	Westminster, Maryland
G	5	Jamari Wheeler	6 ft 1 in (1.85 m)	170 lb (77 kg)	Sr	Rock School	Live Oak, Florida
G	10	Kyle McCloskey	6 ft 5 in (1.96 m)	212 lb (96 kg)	Jr	Germantown Academy	Lower Gwynedd, Pennsylvania
G	12	Izaiah Brockington	6 ft 4 in (1.93 m)	200 lb (91 kg)	RS Jr	Archbishop Ryan High School	Philadelphia, Pennsylvania
F	14	Patrick Kelly	6 ft 8 in (2.03 m)	215 lb (98 kg)	RS Fr	IMG Academy	Raleigh, North Carolina
F	15	Trent Buttrick	6 ft 8 in (2.03 m)	240 lb (109 kg)	Sr	Community School of Naples	Bloomsburg, Pennsylvania
G	20	Taylor Nussbaum	6 ft 2 in (1.88 m)	175 lb (79 kg)	Sr	Cheshire Academy	South Salem, New York
F	21	John Harrar	6 ft 9 in (2.06 m)	240 lb (109 kg)	Sr	Strath Haven High School	Wallingford, Pennsylvania
G	22	Dallion Johnson	6 ft 3 in (1.91 m)	175 lb (79 kg)	Fr	Phillips Academy	Haverhill, Massachusetts
G	23	DJ Gordon	6 ft 5 in (1.96 m)	175 lb (79 kg)	Fr	First Love Christian Academy	Pittsburgh, Pennsylvania
F	30	Abdou Tsimbila	6 ft 8 in (2.03 m)	235 lb (107 kg)	Fr	St. Maria Goretti High School	Yaoundé, Cameroon
G	33	Andy Christos	6 ft 5 in (1.96 m)	175 lb (79 kg)	Fr	Madison High School	Madison, New Jersey

Head coach

- Jim Ferry (Keene State)

Assistant coach(es)

- Keith Urgo (Fairfield)
- Ross Condon (Villanova)
- Talor Battle (Penn State)

Legend

- (C) Team captain
- (S) Suspended
- (I) Ineligible
- (W) Walk-on
- Injured
- Current redshirt

Roster
Last update: April 10, 2021

== Coaching staff ==
Position	Name	Year	Alma mater
Head coach	Jim Ferry	2017	Keene State (1990)
Associate head coach	Keith Urgo	2011	Fairfield (2002)
Assistant coach	Talor Battle	2020	Penn State (2011)
Assistant coach	Ross Condon	2011	Villanova (2007)
Director of Basketball Operations	Nicholas Colella	2015	Penn State (2013)
Director of Recruiting	Kevin Hudash	2018	Penn State (2017)
Athletic trainer	Jon Salazer	2001	Penn State (1993)
Director of player development	David Caporaletti	2011	Philadelphia (1993)
Strength and conditioning coach	Greg Miskinis	2009	Penn State (2008)
Graduate assistant	K.J. Baptiste	2019	Brandeis (2018)

== Schedule and results ==
Date time, TV	Rank^{#}	Opponent^{#}	Result	Record	High points	High rebounds	High assists	Site (attendance) city, state
Regular season
November 25, 2020*; BTN		Drexel	Cancelled due to COVID-19 protocols					Bryce Jordan Center; University Park, PA
November 28, 2020*; 1:00 pm, BTN+		VMI	W 86–65	1–0	18 – Wheeler	9 – Harrar	3 – Sessoms	Bryce Jordan Center (248); University Park, PA
December 2, 2020*; 5:00 pm, FS1		VCU	W 72–69	2–0	32 – Lundy	8 – Tied	6 – Jones	Bryce Jordan Center (283); University Park, PA
December 6, 2020*; 8:00 pm, BTN		Seton Hall	L 92–98 ^{OT}	2–1	23 – Lundy	8 – Harrar	6 – Sessoms	Bryce Jordan Center (264); University Park, PA
December 8, 2020*; 9:00 pm, ESPNU		at No. 15 Virginia Tech; ACC–Big Ten Challenge	W 75–55	3–1	24 – Brockington	8 – Brockington	6 – Wheeler	Cassell Coliseum (250); Blacksburg, VA
Big Ten regular season
December 13, 2020; 2:00 pm, BTN		at Michigan	L 58–62	3–2 (0–1)	14 – Brockington	7 – Buttrick	4 – Wheeler	Crisler Center (0); Ann Arbor, MI
December 23, 2020; 6:30 pm, BTN		No. 18 Illinois	L 81–98	3–3 (0–2)	21 – Tied	7 – Buttrick	5 – Wheeler	Bryce Jordan Center (158); University Park, PA
December 30, 2020; 8:30 pm, BTN		at Indiana	L 85–87 ^{OT}	3–4 (0–3)	20 – Jones	10 – Harrar	3 – Tied	Assembly Hall (0); Bloomington, IN
January 17, 2021; 1:00 pm, BTN		at Purdue	L 72–80	3–5 (0–4)	23 – Jones	14 – Harrar	3 – Tied	Mackey Arena (168); West Lafayette, IN
January 19, 2021; 8:30 pm, BTN		at No. 22 Illinois	L 65–79	3–6 (0–5)	20 – Jones	9 – Harrar	3 – Brockington	State Farm Center (148); Champaign, IL
January 21, 2021; 7:00 pm, BTN		Rutgers	W 75–67	4–6 (1–5)	17 – Tied	11 – Harrar	6 – Wheeler	Bryce Jordan Center (209); University Park, PA
January 23, 2021; 7:00 pm, BTN		Northwestern	W 81-78	5-6 (2-5)	21 – Brockington	10 – Harrar	4 – Wheeler	Bryce Jordan Center (273); University Park, PA
January 27, 2021; 7:00 pm, BTN		No. 4 Michigan	Postponed due to COVID-19 issues at Michigan					Bryce Jordan Center; University Park, PA
January 27, 2021; 7:00 pm, BTN		at No. 13 Ohio State	L 79-83	5-7 (2-6)	26 – Lundy	10 – Harrar	3 – Tied	Value City Arena (0); Columbus, OH
January 30, 2021; 3:00 pm, BTN		No. 14 Wisconsin	W 81-71	6-7 (3-6)	20 – Jones	9 – Brockington	5 – Wheeler	Bryce Jordan Center (260); University Park, PA
February 2, 2021; 8:30 pm, BTN		at No. 19 Wisconsin	L 56–72	6–8 (3–7)	14 – Jones	5 – Harrar	2 – Tied	Kohl Center (0); Madison, WI
February 5, 2021; 7:00 pm, FS1		Maryland	W 55–50	7–8 (4–7)	13 – Brockington	12 – Harrar	2 – Tied	Bryce Jordan Center (279); University Park, PA
February 9, 2021; 7:00 pm, ESPN2		at Michigan State	L 58–60	7–9 (4–8)	17 – Harrar	14 – Harrar	4 – Harrar	Breslin Center (0); East Lansing, MI
February 14, 2021; 3:00 pm, BTN		Nebraska	L 61-62	7-10 (4-9)	18 – Jones	11 – Harrar	3 – Sessoms	Bryce Jordan Center (245); University Park, PA
February 18, 2021; 8:00 pm, BTN		No. 4 Ohio State	L 82–92	7–11 (4–10)	18 – Jones	7 – Wheeler	7 – Brockington	Bryce Jordan Center (244); University Park, PA
February 21, 2021; 5:00 pm, FS1		at No. 11 Iowa	L 68–74	7–12 (4–11)	11 – Tied	7 – Brockington	6 – Sessoms	Carver–Hawkeye Arena (566); Iowa City, IA
February 23, 2021; 8:00 pm, BTN		at Nebraska	W 86–83	8–12 (5–11)	29 – Jones	14 – Harrar	4 – Tied	Pinnacle Bank Arena (0); Lincoln, NE
February 26, 2021; 7:00 pm, FS1		Purdue	L 52–73	8–13 (5–12)	11 – Jones	6 – Wheeler	6 – Wheeler	Bryce Jordan Center (261); University Park, PA
March 3, 2021; 7:00 pm, BTN		Minnesota	W 84–65	9–13 (6–12)	17 – Jones	11 – Harrar	5 – Tied	Bryce Jordan Center (258); University Park, PA
March 7, 2021; 7:00 pm, BTN		at Maryland	W 66–61	10–13 (7–12)	31 – Lundy	8 – Lundy	3 – Wheeler	Xfinity Center (0); College Park, MD
Big Ten tournament
March 10, 2021; 9:00 pm, BTN	(11)	vs. (14) Nebraska; First round	W 72–66	11–13	19 – Wheeler	14 – Harrar	4 – Harrar	Lucas Oil Stadium (5,909); Indianapolis, IN
March 11, 2021; 9:00 pm, BTN	(11)	vs. (6) Wisconsin; Second round	L 74–75	11–14	18 – Sessoms	10 – Harrar	4 – Jones	Lucas Oil Stadium (6,769); Indianapolis, IN
*Non-conference game. ^{#}Rankings from AP Poll. (#) Tournament seedings in parentheses. All times are in Eastern Time.
