= 2020–21 Indiana Hoosiers men's basketball team =

American college basketball season

2020–21 Indiana Hoosiers men's basketball
- Conference: Big Ten Conference
- Record: 12–15 (7–12 Big Ten)
- Head coach: Archie Miller (4th season)
- Assistant coaches: Tom Ostrom (4th season); Mike Roberts (2nd season); Kenya Hunter (1st season)
- Captains: Al Durham; Joey Brunk; Rob Phinisee; Race Thompson
- Home arena: Simon Skjodt Assembly Hall

2020–21 Big Ten Conference men's basketball standings
	Conf.				Overall
Team	W		L	PCT	W		L	PCT
No. 4 Michigan	14	–	3	.824	23	–	5	.821
No. 2 Illinois †	16	–	4	.800	24	–	7	.774
No. 8 Iowa	14	–	6	.700	22	–	9	.710
No. 20 Purdue	13	–	6	.684	18	–	10	.643
No. 7 Ohio State	12	–	8	.600	21	–	10	.677
Wisconsin	10	–	10	.500	18	–	13	.581
Rutgers	10	–	10	.500	16	–	12	.571
Maryland	9	–	11	.450	17	–	14	.548
Michigan State	9	–	11	.450	15	–	13	.536
Indiana	7	–	12	.368	12	–	15	.444
Penn State	7	–	12	.368	11	–	14	.440
Northwestern	6	–	13	.316	9	–	15	.375
Minnesota	6	–	14	.300	14	–	15	.483
Nebraska	3	–	16	.158	7	–	20	.259
† Conference tournament winner Rankings from AP poll

The 2020–21 Indiana Hoosiers men's basketball team represented Indiana University in the 2020–21 NCAA Division I men's basketball season. The head coach was Archie Miller, in his fourth and final year as Indiana head coach. The team played its home games at Simon Skjodt Assembly Hall in Bloomington, Indiana, as a member of the Big Ten Conference. The Hoosiers finished the season 12–15, 7–12 in Big Ten play to finish in a tie for the 10th place. As the No. 10 seed in the Big Ten tournament, they lost in the first round to Rutgers.

On March 15, 2021, the school fired Miller after four years and began its search for the next men's head basketball coach. Two weeks later, the school named former Indiana player and New York Knicks assistant Mike Woodson as the new head coach.

== Previous season ==
The Hoosiers started off another strong campaign by going 11–1 before dropping back-to-back games in late December 2019 and early January 2020. During the bulk of the conference season, IU was able to win most of their home games (7–3), while stealing a few road games (2–8) to end their final season with an overall record of 20–12 and a conference record of 9–11. Indiana entered the Big Ten tournament as the 11-seed where they faced the 14-seeded Nebraska Cornhuskers. The first round matchup ended in an 89–64 IU victory, staging a second round matchup with 6-seed Penn State.

However, on the morning of March 12, 2020, the Big Ten Conference announced that it would be cancelling the remaining tournament games due to the COVID-19 pandemic. Following suit, that afternoon, the NCAA announced that it was cancelling all winter and spring championships. This announcement officially, and abruptly, ended the Hoosiers' season, where they were expected to make the NCAA tournament for the first time in four years.

== Offseason ==
=== Departures ===
Indiana departures
Name	Number	Pos.	Height	Weight	Year	Hometown	Reason for departure
Devonte Green	11	G	6'3"	185	Senior	North Babylon, New York	Graduated
Adrian Chapman	15	G	6'2"	190	Senior	Brownsburg, Indiana	Graduated
De'Ron Davis	20	F	6'10"	255	Senior	Aurora, Colorado	Graduated
Justin Smith	3	F	6'7"	230	Junior	Buffalo Grove, Illinois	Transferred to Arkansas
Damezi Anderson	23	F	6'7"	225	Sophomore	South Bend, Indiana	Transferred to Loyola

=== Recruiting class ===
Miller continued to implement his "inside-out" approach to recruiting by adding two more highly ranked recruits from Indiana: Trey Galloway and Anthony Leal, who was named 2020 Indiana Mr. Basketball on April 10, 2020. With Leal earning this honor, he made three straight Indiana Mr. Basketballs to attend IU, the first time this had happened in the storied history of the program. Miller also nabbed the New Hampshire Gatorade Player of the Year, 4-star recruit Jordan Geronimo. On May 18, 2020, it was announced that Khristian Lander, who was originally a 2021–22 commit, was reclassifying to 2020. He stated that a big factor in his decision was the chance to play with Trayce Jackson-Davis and "dominate the Big Ten."

College recruiting
Name	Hometown	School	Height	Weight	Commit date
Trey Galloway; SG	Culver, IN	Culver Academies	6 ft 5 in (1.96 m)	200 lb (91 kg)	Jul 26, 2019
Trey Galloway; SG	Recruit ratings: Scout: Rivals: 247Sports: ESPN: (80)				
Anthony Leal; SG	Bloomington, IN	Bloomington South High School	6 ft 5 in (1.96 m)	195 lb (88 kg)	Aug 9, 2019
Anthony Leal; SG	Recruit ratings: Scout: Rivals: 247Sports: ESPN: (80)				
Jordan Geronimo; F	Concord, NH	St. Paul's School	6 ft 6 in (1.98 m)	195 lb (88 kg)	Sep 2, 2019
Jordan Geronimo; F	Recruit ratings: Scout: Rivals: 247Sports: ESPN: (80)				
Khristian Lander; PG	Evansville, IN	FJ Reitz High School	6 ft 2 in (1.88 m)	165 lb (75 kg)	Feb 25, 2020
Khristian Lander; PG	Recruit ratings: Scout: Rivals: 247Sports: ESPN: (93)				
Overall recruit ranking:
Note: In many cases, Scout, Rivals, 247Sports, On3, and ESPN may conflict in their listings of height and weight.; In these cases, the average was taken. ESPN grades are on a 100-point scale.; Sources: "2020 Team Ranking". Rivals.

== Roster ==
2020–21 Indiana Hoosiers men's basketball team
Players
Coaches

Pos.	#	Name	Height	Weight	Year	Previous school	Hometown
G	0	Cooper Bybee (W)	6 ft 1 in (1.85 m)	188 lb (85 kg)	Sr	Edgewood/Olney Central	Ellettsville, Indiana
G	1	Al Durham	6 ft 4 in (1.93 m)	185 lb (84 kg)	Sr	Berkmar	Lilburn, Georgia
G	2	Armaan Franklin	6 ft 4 in (1.93 m)	195 lb (88 kg)	So	Cathedral	Indianapolis, Indiana
G	3	Anthony Leal	6 ft 5 in (1.96 m)	210 lb (95 kg)	Fr	Bloomington South	Bloomington, Indiana
G	4	Khristian Lander	6 ft 2 in (1.88 m)	185 lb (84 kg)	Fr	FJ Reitz	Evansville, Indiana
G	5	Michael Shipp (W)	6 ft 3 in (1.91 m)	190 lb (86 kg)	So	Moeller	Cincinnati, Ohio
G	10	Rob Phinisee	6 ft 1 in (1.85 m)	187 lb (85 kg)	Jr	McCutcheon	Lafayette, Indiana
F	14	Nathan Childress (W)	6 ft 6 in (1.98 m)	212 lb (96 kg)	So	Zionsville	Zionsville, Indiana
G	15	Sebastien Scott (W)	6 ft 2 in (1.88 m)	185 lb (84 kg)	Fr	San Ramon Valley	Danville, California
F	21	Jerome Hunter	6 ft 7 in (2.01 m)	215 lb (98 kg)	RS So	Pickerington North	Pickerington, Ohio
F	22	Jordan Geronimo	6 ft 6 in (1.98 m)	220 lb (100 kg)	Fr	St. Paul's School	Newark, New Jersey
F	23	Trayce Jackson-Davis	6 ft 9 in (2.06 m)	245 lb (111 kg)	So	Center Grove	Greenwood, Indiana
F	25	Race Thompson	6 ft 8 in (2.03 m)	228 lb (103 kg)	RS Jr	Armstrong	Plymouth, Minnesota
G	32	Trey Galloway	6 ft 4 in (1.93 m)	210 lb (95 kg)	Fr	Culver Academies	Culver, Indiana
G	45	Parker Stewart	6 ft 5 in (1.96 m)	200 lb (91 kg)	GS	Union City/Pitt/UT Martin	Union City, Tennessee
C	50	Joey Brunk	6 ft 11 in (2.11 m)	255 lb (116 kg)	RS Sr	Southport/Butler	Indianapolis, Indiana

Head coach

- Archie Miller (NC State)

Assistant coach(es)

- Tom Ostrom (Minnesota)
- Mike Roberts (Indiana)
- Kenya Hunter (Duquesne)

Legend

- (C) Team captain
- (S) Suspended
- (I) Ineligible
- (W) Walk-on
- Injured
- Current redshirt

Roster
Last update: March 24, 2021

== Schedule and results ==
- Due to the COVID-19 pandemic, games were played without an audience, or with very limited attendance.
- With the entire 2021 NCAA tournament being hosted in the state of Indiana, the Big Ten Conference also decided to host the 2021 Big Ten men's basketball tournament at Lucas Oil Stadium in Indianapolis instead of the original scheduled site, the United Center in Chicago, Illinois. The idea behind this change was that teams playing in both tournaments could stay in Indianapolis and avoid excess travel and possibly avoid further exposure/transmittance of COVID-19. Lucas Oil Stadium was chosen as the host site since the 2021 Big Ten women's basketball tournament was being hosted at Bankers Life Fieldhouse.

Date time, TV	Rank^{#}	Opponent^{#}	Result	Record	High points	High rebounds	High assists	Site (attendance) city, state
Non-conference regular season
November 25, 2020*; 8:00 pm, BTN		Tennessee Tech	W 89–59	1–0	26 – Jackson-Davis	11 – Jackson-Davis	4 – Durham	Simon Skjodt Assembly Hall (125); Bloomington, IN
November 30, 2020*; 2:30 pm, ESPN2		vs. Providence; 2020 Maui Invitational Tournament Quarterfinals	W 79–58	2–0	22 – Thompson	13 – Thompson	5 – Phinisee	Harrah's Cherokee Center (0); Asheville, NC
December 1, 2020*; 1:30 pm, ESPN		vs. No. 17 Texas; 2020 Maui Invitational Tournament Semifinals	L 44–66	2–1	17 – Jackson-Davis	7 – Franklin	4 – Lander	Harrah's Cherokee Center (0); Asheville, NC
December 2, 2020*; 1:30 pm, ESPN		vs. Stanford; 2020 Maui Invitational Tournament Third-place game	W 79–63	3–1	31 – Jackson-Davis	8 – Tied	5 – Franklin	Harrah's Cherokee Center (0); Asheville, NC
December 9, 2020*; 7:15 pm, ESPN		at No. 20 Florida State; ACC–Big Ten Challenge	L 67–69 ^{OT}	3–2	25 – Jackson-Davis	17 – Jackson-Davis	4 – Durham	Donald L. Tucker Center (2,956); Tallahassee, FL
December 13, 2020*; 12:00 pm, BTN		North Alabama	W 87–52	4–2	19 – Franklin	7 – Tied	5 – Franklin	Simon Skjodt Assembly Hall (0); Bloomington, IN
December 19, 2020*; 11:30 am, FS1		vs. Butler; Crossroads Classic	W 68–60	5–2	21 – Jackson-Davis	8 – Tied	5 – Galloway	Bankers Life Fieldhouse (0); Indianapolis, IN
Big Ten regular season
December 23, 2020; 8:30 pm, BTN		Northwestern	L 67–74	5–3 (0–1)	22 – Jackson-Davis	9 – Jackson-Davis	3 – Tied	Simon Skjodt Assembly Hall (0); Bloomington, IN
December 26, 2020; 4:00 pm, FS1		at No. 18 Illinois; Illinois–Indiana men's basketball rivalry	L 60–69	5–4 (0–2)	23 – Franklin	8 – Jackson-Davis	3 – Durham	State Farm Center (178); Champaign, IL
December 30, 2020; 8:30 pm, BTN		Penn State	W 87–85 ^{OT}	6–4 (1–2)	21 – Jackson-Davis	6 – Tied	5 – Galloway	Simon Skjodt Assembly Hall (0); Bloomington, IN
January 4, 2021; 8:30 pm, BTN		Maryland	W 63–55	7–4 (2–2)	22 – Jackson-Davis	15 – Jackson-Davis	3 – Tied	Simon Skjodt Assembly Hall (0); Bloomington, IN
January 7, 2021; 7:00 pm, FS1		at No. 8 Wisconsin	L 73–80 ^{2OT}	7–5 (2–3)	23 – Jackson-Davis	12 – Jackson-Davis	6 – Phinisee	Kohl Center (0); Madison, WI
January 10, 2021; 6:00 pm, BTN		at Nebraska	W 84–76	8–5 (3–3)	18 – Phinisee	11 – Jackson-Davis	4 – Phinisee	Pinnacle Bank Arena (0); Lincoln, NE
January 14, 2021; 7:00 pm, FS1		Purdue; Rivalry/Indiana National Guard Governor's Cup	L 69–81	8–6 (3–4)	25 – Jackson-Davis	10 – Thompson	4 – Galloway	Simon Skjodt Assembly Hall (0); Bloomington, IN
January 21, 2021; 9:00 pm, FS1		at No. 4 Iowa	W 81–69	9–6 (4–4)	23 – Jackson-Davis	7 – Jackson-Davis	4 – Thompson	Carver–Hawkeye Arena (566); Iowa City, IA
January 24, 2021; 12:00 pm, BTN		Rutgers	L 70–74	9–7 (4–5)	14 – Franklin	7 – Jackson-Davis	5 – Phinisee	Simon Skjodt Assembly Hall (0); Bloomington, IN
January 30, 2021; 1:00 pm, CBS		at No. 4 Michigan	Cancelled due to COVID-19 issues at Michigan					Crisler Center; Ann Arbor, MI
February 2, 2021; 9:00 pm, ESPN		No. 12 Illinois; Illinois–Indiana men's basketball rivalry	L 71–75 ^{OT}	9–8 (4–6)	19 – Jackson-Davis	14 – Jackson-Davis	3 – Galloway	Simon Skjodt Assembly Hall (0); Bloomington, IN
February 7, 2021; 12:00 pm, FOX		No. 8 Iowa	W 67–65	10–8 (5–6)	17 – Jackson-Davis	12 – Jackson-Davis	5 – Franklin	Simon Skjodt Assembly Hall (0); Bloomington, IN
February 10, 2021; 5:30 pm, BTN		at Northwestern	W 79–76 ^{2OT}	11–8 (6–6)	24 – Durham	14 – Jackson-Davis	5 – Phinisee	Welsh–Ryan Arena (0); Evanston, IL
February 13, 2021; 12:00 pm, ESPN		at No. 4 Ohio State	L 59–78	11–9 (6–7)	23 – Jackson-Davis	9 – Jackson-Davis	3 – Tied	Value City Arena (0); Columbus, OH
February 17, 2021; 9:00 pm, BTN		Minnesota	W 82–72	12–9 (7–7)	20 – Jackson-Davis	10 – Jackson-Davis	5 – Franklin	Simon Skjodt Assembly Hall (0); Bloomington, IN
February 20, 2021; 12:00 pm, ESPN		Michigan State	L 71–78	12–10 (7–8)	34 – Jackson-Davis	9 – Jackson-Davis	4 – Phinisee	Simon Skjodt Assembly Hall (0); Bloomington, IN
February 24, 2021; 8:00 pm, BTN		at Rutgers	L 63–74	12–11 (7–9)	21 – Jackson-Davis	11 – Jackson-Davis	4 – Durham	Rutgers Athletic Center (64); Piscatawy, NJ
February 27, 2021; 12:00 pm, FOX		No. 3 Michigan	L 57–73	12–12 (7–10)	15 – Durham	6 – Tied	3 – Jackson-Davis	Simon Skjodt Assembly Hall (0); Bloomington, IN
March 2, 2021; 8:00 pm, BTN		at Michigan State	L 58–64	12–13 (7–11)	16 – Phinisee	7 – Jackson-Davis	4 – Phinisee	Breslin Center (0); East Lansing, MI
March 6, 2021; 2:00 pm, ESPN		at No. 23 Purdue; Rivalry/Indiana National Guard Governor's Cup	L 58–67	12–14 (7–12)	14 – Durham	6 – Phinisee	4 – Phinisee	Mackey Arena (250); West Lafayette, IN
Big Ten tournament
March 11, 2021; 6:30 pm, BTN	(10)	vs. (7) Rutgers; Second round	L 50–61	12–15	19 – Jackson-Davis	9 – Jackson-Davis	7 – Phinisee	Lucas Oil Stadium (6,769); Indianapolis, IN
*Non-conference game. ^{#}Rankings from AP Poll. (#) Tournament seedings in parentheses. All times are in Eastern Time.

== Player statistics ==
Individual player statistics (final)
			Minutes		Scoring		Total FGs			3-point FGs			Free-throws			Rebounds							
Player	GP	GS	Tot	Avg	Pts	Avg	FG	FGA	Pct	3FG	3FGA	Pct	FT	FTA	Pct	Off	Def	Tot	Avg	A	Stl	Blk	TO
Brunk, Joey	0	0	0	0.0	0	0.0	0	0	.000	0	0	.000	0	0	.000	0	0	0	0.0	0	0	0	0
Bybee, Cooper	2	0	2	1.0	2	1.0	0	1	.000	0	1	.000	2	2	1.000	0	0	0	0.0	0	0	0	0
Childress, Nathan	4	0	5	1.3	0	0.0	0	0	.000	0	0	.000	0	0	.000	0	2	2	0.5	0	1	0	0
Durham, Al	26	26	846	32.5	293	11.3	87	224	.388	38	100	.380	81	103	.786	9	72	81	3.1	67	14	3	36
Franklin, Armaan	22	20	661	30.0	250	11.4	87	203	.429	36	85	.424	40	54	.741	13	78	91	4.1	47	26	5	48
Galloway, Trey	25	7	492	19.7	90	3.6	35	84	.417	6	33	.182	14	19	.737	12	35	47	1.9	39	11	1	25
Geronimo, Jordan	21	0	169	8.0	47	2.2	19	37	.514	4	10	.400	5	18	.278	12	25	37	1.8	5	6	2	10
Hunter, Jerome	25	4	487	19.5	157	6.3	59	136	.434	25	73	.342	14	27	.519	14	61	75	3.0	15	9	3	22
Jackson-Davis, Trayce	27	27	924	34.2	516	19.1	183	354	.517	0	0	.000	150	229	.655	87	156	243	9.0	39	20	38	59
Lander, Khristian	26	0	264	10.2	55	2.1	18	70	.257	12	44	.273	7	8	.875	0	21	21	0.8	30	9	4	26
Leal, Anthony	20	0	232	11.6	32	1.6	10	32	.313	9	30	.300	3	5	.600	7	20	27	1.4	20	9	1	11
Phinisee, Robert	27	24	731	27.1	193	7.1	69	199	.347	25	96	.260	30	47	.638	4	59	63	2.3	77	22	10	36
Scott, Sebastien	0	0	0	0.0	0	0.0	0	0	0.0	0	0	0.0	0	0	0.0	0	0	0	0.0	0	0	0	0
Shipp, Michael	1	0	1	1.0	0	0.0	0	1	.000	0	1	.000	0	0	.000	0	0	0	0.0	0	0	0	0
Thompson, Race	27	27	761	28.2	247	9.1	87	169	.515	3	15	.200	70	114	.614	54	113	167	6.2	37	28	34	31
Total	27	-	1115	41.3	1882	69.7	654	1510	.433	158	488	.324	416	626	.665	244	689	933	34.6	376	155	101	322
Opponents	-	-	1115	41.3	1873	69.4	655	1539	.426	193	578	.334	370	516	.717	260	713	973	36.0	319	159	98	330

Legend
GP	Games played	GS	Games started	Avg	Average per game
FG	Field-goals made	FGA	Field-goal attempts	Off	Offensive rebounds
Def	Defensive rebounds	A	Assists	TO	Turnovers
Blk	Blocks	Stl	Steals	High	Team high

== Rankings ==
Ranking movements Legend: ██ Increase in ranking ██ Decrease in ranking — = Not ranked RV = Received votes
	Week																			
Poll	Pre	1	2	3	4	5	6	7	8	9	10	11	12	13	14	15	16	17	18	Final
AP	RV	RV	RV	RV	RV	RV	RV	RV	—	—	—	—	—	—	—	—	—	—	—	Not released
Coaches	RV	RV	RV	RV	RV	—	—	—	—	—	—	—	—	—	—	—	—	—	—	—

*AP does not release post-NCAA Tournament rankings.

== See also ==
- 2020–21 Indiana Hoosiers women's basketball team
