= 2020–21 Minnesota Golden Gophers men's basketball team =

American college basketball season

2020–21 Minnesota Golden Gophers men's basketball
- Conference: Big Ten Conference
- Record: 14–15 (6–14 Big Ten)
- Head coach: Richard Pitino (8th season)
- Assistant coaches: Ed Conroy (5th season); Kyle Lindsted (3rd season); Jeff Mailhot (1st season)
- Home arena: Williams Arena

2020–21 Big Ten Conference men's basketball standings
	Conf.				Overall
Team	W		L	PCT	W		L	PCT
No. 4 Michigan	14	–	3	.824	23	–	5	.821
No. 2 Illinois †	16	–	4	.800	24	–	7	.774
No. 8 Iowa	14	–	6	.700	22	–	9	.710
No. 20 Purdue	13	–	6	.684	18	–	10	.643
No. 7 Ohio State	12	–	8	.600	21	–	10	.677
Wisconsin	10	–	10	.500	18	–	13	.581
Rutgers	10	–	10	.500	16	–	12	.571
Maryland	9	–	11	.450	17	–	14	.548
Michigan State	9	–	11	.450	15	–	13	.536
Indiana	7	–	12	.368	12	–	15	.444
Penn State	7	–	12	.368	11	–	14	.440
Northwestern	6	–	13	.316	9	–	15	.375
Minnesota	6	–	14	.300	14	–	15	.483
Nebraska	3	–	16	.158	7	–	20	.259
† Conference tournament winner Rankings from AP poll

The 2020–21 Minnesota Golden Gophers men's basketball team represented the University of Minnesota in the 2020–21 NCAA Division I men's basketball season. The Gophers were led by eighth-year head coach Richard Pitino and played their home games at Williams Arena in Minneapolis, Minnesota as members of the Big Ten Conference. The Gophers finished the season 14–15, 6–14 in Big Ten play to finish in 13th place. They defeated Northwestern in the first round of the Big Ten tournament before losing to Ohio State in the second round.

Following the season, the school fired Richard Pitino after eight years at the school. On March 23, 2021, the school named Minnesota alum and former Minnesota assistant coach Ben Johnson the new head coach.

== Previous season ==
The Gophers finished the 2019–20 season 15–16, 8–12 in Big Ten play to finish in 12th place. The Gophers defeated Northwestern in the first round of the Big Ten tournament before the tournament was canceled due to the ongoing COVID-19 pandemic. All other postseason tournaments including the NCAA tournament were later canceled effectively ending the season.

== Offseason ==
=== Departures ===
Name	Number	Pos.	Height	Weight	Year	Hometown	Reason for departure
Payton Willis	0	G	6'4"	200	RS Junior	Fayetteville, AR	Transferred to College of Charleston
Bryan Greenlee	3	G	6'0"	175	Freshman	Gainesville, FL	Transferred to Florida Atlantic
Brady Rudrud	10	G	6'2"	190	Senior	Eden Prairie, MN	Graduated, walk-on
Daniel Oturu	25	C	6'10"	225	Sophomore	Woodbury, MN	Declared for NBA Draft
Alihan Demir	30	F	6'9"	235	Senior	Ankara, Turkey	Graduated
Michael Hurt	42	F	6'7"	220	Senior	Rochester, MN	Graduated

=== Incoming transfers ===
Name	Pos.	Height	Weight	Year	Hometown	Previous School
Brandon Johnson	F	6'8"	200	Senior	Chicago, IL	Western Michigan
Liam Robbins	C	7'0"	235	Junior	Davenport, IA	Drake
Both Gach	G	6'6"	183	Junior	Austin, MN	Utah

=== Recruiting classes ===
==== 2020 recruiting class ====
College recruiting information
Name	Hometown	School	Height	Weight	Commit date
Martice Mitchell; PF	Chicago Heights, Illinois	Bloom High School	6 ft 10 in (2.08 m)	190 lb (86 kg)	Oct 7, 2019
Martice Mitchell; PF	Recruit ratings: Rivals: 247Sports: ESPN: (79)				
Jamal Mashburn Jr. CG	Miami, Florida	Brewster Academy	6 ft 0 in (1.83 m)	160 lb (73 kg)	Oct 14, 2019
Jamal Mashburn Jr. CG	Recruit ratings: Rivals: 247Sports: ESPN: (80)				
David Mutaf; CG	Istanbul, Turkey	Fenerbahce Basketball Subesi	6 ft 5 in (1.96 m)	190 lb (86 kg)	May 24, 2020
David Mutaf; CG	Recruit ratings: Rivals: 247Sports:				
Overall recruit ranking:
Note: In many cases, Scout, Rivals, 247Sports, On3, and ESPN may conflict in their listings of height and weight.; In these cases, the average was taken. ESPN grades are on a 100-point scale.; Sources: "2020 Team Ranking". Rivals.

==== 2021 recruiting class ====
College recruiting information (2021)
Name	Hometown	School	Height	Weight	Commit date
Treyton Thompson; PF	Alexandria, Minnesota	La Lumiere School	6 ft 11 in (2.11 m)	190 lb (86 kg)	Nov 30, 2019
Treyton Thompson; PF	Recruit ratings: Rivals: 247Sports:				
Overall recruit ranking:
Note: In many cases, Scout, Rivals, 247Sports, On3, and ESPN may conflict in their listings of height and weight.; In these cases, the average was taken. ESPN grades are on a 100-point scale.; Sources: "2021 Team Ranking". Rivals.

== Roster ==
2020–21 Minnesota Golden Gophers men's basketball team
Players
Coaches

Pos.	#	Name	Height	Weight	Year	Previous school	Hometown
C	0	Liam Robbins	7 ft 0 in (2.13 m)	235 lb (107 kg)	Jr	Assumption; Drake	Davenport, IA
G	1	Tre' Williams	6 ft 5 in (1.96 m)	195 lb (88 kg)	So	Wasatch Academy	Dallas, TX
F	2	Martice Mitchell	6 ft 10 in (2.08 m)	190 lb (86 kg)	Fr	Bloom	Chicago, IL
G	4	Jamal Mashburn Jr.	6 ft 2 in (1.88 m)	175 lb (79 kg)	Fr	Brewster Academy	Miami, FL
G	5	Marcus Carr (C)	6 ft 2 in (1.88 m)	195 lb (88 kg)	RS Jr	Montverde Academy; Pittsburgh	Toronto, ON
G	11	Both Gach	6 ft 6 in (1.98 m)	185 lb (84 kg)	Jr	Arizona Compass Prep; Utah	Austin, MN
G	13	Hunt Conroy (W)	5 ft 10 in (1.78 m)	165 lb (75 kg)	Sr	Jesuit	New Orleans, LA
F	21	Jarvis Omersa	6 ft 6 in (1.98 m)	235 lb (107 kg)	Jr	Orono	Orono, MN
G	22	Gabe Kalscheur (C)	6 ft 4 in (1.93 m)	200 lb (91 kg)	Jr	DeLaSalle	Edina, MN
F	23	Brandon Johnson	6 ft 8 in (2.03 m)	220 lb (100 kg)	RS Sr	Thea Bowman Leadership Academy; Western Michigan	Chicago, IL
F	24	Eric Curry (C)	6 ft 9 in (2.06 m)	240 lb (109 kg)	RS Sr	Southwest Christian Academy	Memphis, TN
C	32	Sam Freeman	6 ft 10 in (2.08 m)	240 lb (109 kg)	So	Northwest	Dallas, TX
F	35	Isaiah Ihnen	6 ft 9 in (2.06 m)	210 lb (95 kg)	So	IBA Munich	Böblingen, Germany

Head coach

- Richard Pitino (Providence)

Assistant coach(es)

- Ed Conroy (The Citadel)
- Kyle Lindsted (Central Christian (KS))
- Jeff Mailhot (Cal Baptist)

Legend

- (C) Team captain
- (S) Suspended
- (I) Ineligible
- (W) Walk-on
- Injured
- Current redshirt

Roster

== Schedule and results ==
Date time, TV	Rank^{#}	Opponent^{#}	Result	Record	High points	High rebounds	High assists	Site (attendance) city, state
Regular season
November 25, 2020*; 6:00 p.m., BTN Plus		Green Bay	W 99–69	1–0	35 – Carr	9 – Robbins	4 – Tied	Williams Arena (0); Minneapolis, MN
November 28, 2020*; 5:00 p.m., BTN		Loyola Marymount	W 88–73	2–0	28 – Carr	8 – Robbins	8 – Carr	Williams Arena (0); Minneapolis, MN
November 30, 2020*; 7:00 p.m., BTN		Loyola Marymount	W 67–64	3–0	26 – Carr	7 – Carr	4 – Gach	Williams Arena (0); Minneapolis, MN
December 4, 2020*; 8:00 p.m., BTN		North Dakota	W 76–67	4–0	21 – Gach	9 – Gach	9 – Carr	Williams Arena (0); Minneapolis, MN
December 8, 2020*; 6:00 p.m., ESPNU		Boston College; ACC–Big Ten Challenge	W 85–80 ^{OT}	5–0	22 – Carr	9 – Gach	6 – Carr	Williams Arena (0); Minneapolis, MN
December 10, 2020*; 7:00 p.m., FS1		Kansas City	W 90–61	6–0	27 – Robbins	11 – Ihnen	7 – Carr	Williams Arena (0); Minneapolis, MN
December 15, 2020; 6:00 p.m., ESPN2		at No. 13 Illinois	L 65–92	6–1 (0–1)	16 – Carr	8 – Johnson	4 – Carr	State Farm Center (173); Champaign, IL
December 20, 2020*; 7:30 p.m., FS1		Saint Louis	W 90–82	7–1	32 – Carr	10 – Ihnen	7 – Carr	Williams Arena (0); Minneapolis, MN
December 25, 2020; 7:00 p.m., BTN		No. 4 Iowa	W 102–95 ^{OT}	8–1 (1–1)	30 – Carr	9 – Johnson	8 – Carr	Williams Arena (0); Minneapolis, MN
December 28, 2020; 7:00 p.m., BTN	No. 21	No. 17 Michigan State	W 81–56	9–1 (2–1)	19 – Carr	9 – Tied	5 – Carr	Williams Arena (0); Minneapolis, MN
December 31, 2020; 3:30 p.m., BTN	No. 21	at No. 6 Wisconsin	L 59–71	9–2 (2–2)	15 – Kalscheur	9 – Tied	7 – Carr	Kohl Center (0); Madison, WI
January 3, 2021; 4:30 p.m., BTN	No. 21	No. 25 Ohio State	W 77–60	10–2 (3–2)	27 – Robbins	14 – Robbins	4 – Robbins	Williams Arena (0); Minneapolis, MN
January 6, 2021; 7:30 p.m., BTN	No. 16	at No. 10 Michigan	L 57–82	10–3 (3–3)	14 – Carr	6 – Johnson	2 – Tied	Crisler Center (64); Ann Arbor, MI
January 10, 2021; 1:30 p.m., BTN	No. 16	at No. 5 Iowa	L 71–86	10–4 (3–4)	13 – Tied	8 – Johnson	4 – Carr	Carver–Hawkeye Arena (569); Iowa City, IA
January 16, 2021; 1:00 p.m., ESPN2	No. 23	No. 7 Michigan	W 75–57	11–4 (4–4)	22 – Robbins	8 – Robbins	6 – Carr	Williams Arena (38); Minneapolis, MN
January 23, 2021; 1:00 p.m., BTN	No. 17	Maryland	L 49–63	11–5 (4–5)	25 – Carr	10 – Johnson	3 – Tied	Williams Arena (44); Minneapolis, MN
January 30, 2021; 6:30 p.m., BTN	No. 21	at Purdue	L 62–81	11–6 (4–6)	15 – Robbins	7 – Robbins	5 – Carr	Mackey Arena (250); West Lafayette, IN
February 4, 2021; 8:00 p.m., FS1		at Rutgers	L 72–76	11–7 (4–7)	18 – Carr	10 – Robbins	7 – Carr	Louis Brown Athletic Center (0); Piscataway, NJ
February 8, 2021; 7:00 p.m., BTN		Nebraska	W 79–61	12–7 (5–7)	21 – Carr	10 – Johnson	8 – Carr	Williams Arena (29); Minneapolis, MN
February 11, 2021; 4:00 p.m., ESPN2		No. 24 Purdue	W 71–68	13–7 (6–7)	19 – Carr	10 – Robbins	5 – Carr	Williams Arena (44); Minneapolis, MN
February 14, 2021; 6:00 p.m., FS1		at Maryland	L 59–72	13–8 (6–8)	14 – Mashburn Jr.	7 – Ihnen	3 – Mashburn Jr.	Xfinity Center (0); College Park, MD
February 17, 2021; 8:00 p.m., BTN		at Indiana	L 72–82	13–9 (6–9)	19 – Tied	7 – Johnson	4 – Carr	Simon Skjodt Assembly Hall (0); Bloomington, IN
February 20, 2021; 2:30 p.m., FOX		No. 5 Illinois	L 63-94	13–10 (6–10)	16 – Mashburn Jr.	6 – Mashburn Jr.	4 – Robbins	Williams Arena (56); Minneapolis, MN
February 25, 2021; 8:00 p.m., BTN		Northwestern	L 59–67	13–11 (6–11)	21 – Carr	8 – Curry	7 – Carr	Williams Arena (23); Minneapolis, MN
February 27, 2021; 6:00 p.m., BTN		at Nebraska	L 74-78	13-12 (6-12)	41 – Carr	8 – Curry	3 – Carr	Pinnacle Bank Arena (0); Lincoln, NE
March 3, 2021; 6:00 p.m., BTN		at Penn State	L 65–84	13–13 (6–13)	22 – Carr	10 – Ihnen	4 – Carr	Bryce Jordan Center (258); University Park, PA
March 6, 2021; 11:00 a.m., FOX		Rutgers	L 70–77 ^{OT}	13–14 (6–14)	19 – Johnson	11 – Johnson	3 – Gach	Williams Arena (52); Minneapolis, MN
Big Ten tournament
March 10, 2021; 5:30 p.m., BTN	(13)	vs. (12) Northwestern; First round	W 51–46	14–14	14 – Williams	12 – Curry	6 – Carr	Lucas Oil Stadium (5,909); Indianapolis, IN
March 11, 2021; 1:00 p.m., BTN	(13)	vs. (5) No. 9 Ohio State; Second round	L 75–79	14–15	24 – Carr	8 – Tied	4 – Tied	Lucas Oil Stadium (6,206); Indianapolis, IN
*Non-conference game. ^{#}Rankings from AP Poll. (#) Tournament seedings in parentheses. All times are in Central Time.

== Rankings ==
Ranking movements Legend: ██ Increase in ranking ██ Decrease in ranking — = Not ranked RV = Received votes т = Tied with team above or below
	Week																	
Poll	Pre	1	2	3	4	5	6	7	8	9	10	11	12	13	14	15	16	Final
AP	—	—	—	RV	RV	21т	16	23	17	21	RV	RV	—	—	—	—	—	Not released
Coaches	—	—	—	—	RV	24т	17	19	17	20	RV	RV	—	—	—	—	—	—

*AP does not release post-NCAA Tournament rankings
^Coaches did not release a Week 1 poll.
