= 2020–21 Maryland Terrapins men's basketball team =

American college basketball season

2020–21 Maryland Terrapins men's basketball
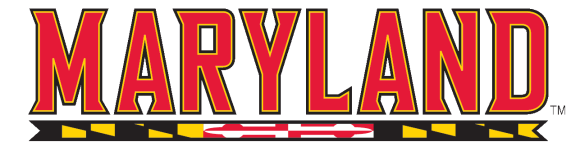

NCAA tournament, Second Round
- Conference: Big Ten Conference
- Record: 17–14 (9–11 Big Ten)
- Head coach: Mark Turgeon (10th season)
- Assistant coaches: Bino Ranson; Matt Brady; DeAndre Haynes
- Home arena: Xfinity Center

2020–21 Big Ten Conference men's basketball standings
	Conf.				Overall
Team	W		L	PCT	W		L	PCT
No. 4 Michigan	14	–	3	.824	23	–	5	.821
No. 2 Illinois †	16	–	4	.800	24	–	7	.774
No. 8 Iowa	14	–	6	.700	22	–	9	.710
No. 20 Purdue	13	–	6	.684	18	–	10	.643
No. 7 Ohio State	12	–	8	.600	21	–	10	.677
Wisconsin	10	–	10	.500	18	–	13	.581
Rutgers	10	–	10	.500	16	–	12	.571
Maryland	9	–	11	.450	17	–	14	.548
Michigan State	9	–	11	.450	15	–	13	.536
Indiana	7	–	12	.368	12	–	15	.444
Penn State	7	–	12	.368	11	–	14	.440
Northwestern	6	–	13	.316	9	–	15	.375
Minnesota	6	–	14	.300	14	–	15	.483
Nebraska	3	–	16	.158	7	–	20	.259
† Conference tournament winner Rankings from AP poll

The 2020–21 Maryland Terrapins men's basketball team represented the University of Maryland, College Park in the 2020–21 NCAA Division I men's basketball season. They were led by 10th-year head coach Mark Turgeon and play their home games at Xfinity Center in College Park, Maryland, as members of the Big Ten Conference. The Terrapins finished the season 17–14, 9–11 in Big Ten play to finish in a tie for eighth place. As the No. 8 seed in the Big Ten tournament, they defeated Michigan State in the second round before losing to Michigan in the quarterfinals. They received an at-large bid to the NCAA tournament as the No. 10 seed in the East region. The defeated UConn in the first round before losing to Alabama in the second round.

Following the season, Turgeon signed a three-year extension to remain head coach through 2026.

== Previous season ==
The Terrapins finished the 2019–20 season 24–7, 14–6 in Big Ten play to finish in a three-way tie for first place. Their season ended following the cancellation of postseason tournaments due to the coronavirus pandemic.

== Offseason ==
=== 2020 recruiting class ===
College recruiting
Name	Hometown	School	Height	Weight	Commit date
Marcus Dockery; PG	Washington, D.C.	Bishop O'Connell High School	6 ft 1 in (1.85 m)	160 lb (73 kg)	Oct 18, 2018
Marcus Dockery; PG	Recruit ratings: Scout: Rivals: 247Sports: ESPN:				
Arnaud Revaz; F	Sion, Switzerland	Bourg-en-Brasse Acadamie	6 ft 10 in (2.08 m)	215 lb (98 kg)	Jul 27, 2020
Arnaud Revaz; F	Recruit ratings: No ratings found				
Aquan Smart; PG	Skokie, Illinois	Niles North High School	6 ft 3 in (1.91 m)	200 lb (91 kg)	Feb 23, 2020
Aquan Smart; PG	Recruit ratings: Scout: Rivals: 247Sports: ESPN:				
James Graham III; SF	Milwaukee, Wisconsin	Nicolet High School	6 ft 8 in (2.03 m)	205 lb (93 kg)	Aug 19, 2020
James Graham III; SF	Recruit ratings: Scout: Rivals: 247Sports: ESPN:				
Overall recruit ranking:
Note: In many cases, Scout, Rivals, 247Sports, On3, and ESPN may conflict in their listings of height and weight.; In these cases, the average was taken. ESPN grades are on a 100-point scale.; Sources: "2020 Maryland Commits". Rivals.; "2020 Team Ranking". Rivals.

=== Incoming transfers ===
Name	Pos.	Height	Weight	Year	Hometown	Transfer From
Jade Brahmbhatt	G	6'0"	160	Junior	Olney, MD	University of the Pacific
Jairus Hamilton	F	6'8"	235	Junior	Charlotte, NC	Boston College
Galin Smith	F	6'9"	235	Senior	Clinton, MS	Alabama

=== Player departures ===
Name	Pos.	Height	Weight	Year	Hometown	Reason for departure
Will Clark	F	6'8"	195	Senior	Baltimore, MD	Graduation
Anthony Cowan Jr.	G	6'0"	180	Senior	Bowie, MD	Graduation/Declared for 2020 NBA draft
Ricky Lindo Jr.	F	6'8"	220	Sophomore	Washington, D.C.	Transfer to George Washington
Jalen Smith	F	6'10"	225	Sophomore	Baltimore, MD	Drafted 10th overall 2020 NBA draft
Serrell Smith Jr.	G	6'4"	175	Sophomore	St. Petersburg. FL	Transfer to East Tennessee State
Joshua Tomaic	F	6'10"	235	Junior (R)	Lanzarote, Spain	Transfer to San Diego State
Travis Valmon	G	6'1"	190	Senior	Rockville, MD	Graduation

== Preseason ==
=== Preseason watch lists ===
Award	Player	Position	Year
Julius Erving Award	Aaron Wiggins	G	JR

== Roster ==
2020–21 Maryland Terrapins men's basketball team
Players
Coaches

Pos.	#	Name	Height	Weight	Year	Previous school	Hometown
G	0	Marcus Dockery	6 ft 2 in (1.88 m)	180 lb (82 kg)	Fr	Brewster Academy	Washington, D.C.
G/F	1	James Graham III	6 ft 8 in (2.03 m)	205 lb (93 kg)	Fr	Nicolet HS	Milwaukee, Wisconsin
G	2	Aaron Wiggins	6 ft 6 in (1.98 m)	200 lb (91 kg)	Jr	Wesleyan Christian Academy	Greensboro, North Carolina
G	5	Eric Ayala	6 ft 5 in (1.96 m)	200 lb (91 kg)	Jr	IMG Academy	Wilmington, Delaware
G	11	Darryl Morsell	6 ft 5 in (1.96 m)	200 lb (91 kg)	Sr	Mount Saint Joseph HS	Baltimore, Maryland
G	12	Reese Mona	6 ft 2 in (1.88 m)	185 lb (84 kg)	Sr	St. John's College HS	La Plata, Maryland
G	13	Hakim Hart	6 ft 6 in (1.98 m)	205 lb (93 kg)	So	Roman Catholic HS	Philadelphia, Pennsylvania
C	15	Chol Marial	7 ft 2 in (2.18 m)	235 lb (107 kg)	So	AZ Compass Prep	Rumbek, South Sudan
G	20	Aidan McCool (W)	6 ft 3 in (1.91 m)	160 lb (73 kg)	Fr	Bishop England HS	Charleston, South Carolina
G	22	Jade Brahmbhatt (W)	6 ft 0 in (1.83 m)	160 lb (73 kg)	Jr	Bethesda-Chevy Chase HS	Olney, Maryland
G	23	Aquan Smart	6 ft 3 in (1.91 m)	175 lb (79 kg)	Fr	Niles North HS	Evanston, Illinois
F	24	Donta Scott	6 ft 7 in (2.01 m)	230 lb (104 kg)	So	Imhotep Charter HS	Philadelphia, Pennsylvania
F	25	Jairus Hamilton	6 ft 8 in (2.03 m)	235 lb (107 kg)	Jr	Cannon School	Charlotte, North Carolina
F	30	Galin Smith	6 ft 9 in (2.06 m)	235 lb (107 kg)	Sr	Clinton HS	Clinton, Mississippi
F	31	Arnaud Revaz	6 ft 10 in (2.08 m)	215 lb (98 kg)	Fr	Bourg-en-Brasse Acadamie	Sion, Switzerland

Head coach

- Mark Turgeon (Kansas)

Assistant coach(es)

- Bino Ranson (Southern New Hampshire)
- Matt Brady (Siena)
- DeAndre Haynes (Kent State)

Legend

- (C) Team captain
- (S) Suspended
- (I) Ineligible
- (W) Walk-on
- Injured
- Current redshirt

Roster

- 2021 recruit James Graham III, who officially signed with the Terps on National Signing Day, will graduate high school early and join the program for the 2020–21 season.
- Walk-on Connor Odom was removed from the team roster prior to the start of the season. No official reason has been reported.

=== Depth chart ===
Pos.	Starting 5	Bench 1	Bench 2
C	Galin Smith	Chol Marial	Arnaud Revaz
PF	Donta Scott	Jairus Hamilton
SF	Darryl Morsell	Hakim Hart	James Graham III
SG	Aaron Wiggins	Reese Mona	Marcus Dockery
PG	Eric Ayala	Aquan Smart

== Schedule and results ==
The team's game against Monmouth, scheduled for December 1, was canceled after Monmouth announced a positive COVID-19 test within its team. The game was replaced with a game against Towson on December 1 before Towson also had a member of their team test positive for COVID-19 and was forced to cancel the game. In addition, games against George Mason and James Madison were likewise canceled due to COVID-19 issues.

Date time, TV	Rank^{#}	Opponent^{#}	Result	Record	High points	High rebounds	High assists	Site (attendance) city, state
Regular Season
November 25, 2020*; 2:00 p.m., BTN+		Old Dominion	W 85–66	1–0	19 – E. Ayala	8 – D. Morsell	4 – D. Morsell	Xfinity Center (0); College Park, MD
November 27, 2020*; 3:00 p.m., BTN		Navy	W 82–52	2–0	15 – Tied	5 – Tied	6 – Tied	Xfinity Center (0); College Park, MD
November 29, 2020*; 2:00 p.m., BTN		Mount St. Mary's	W 79–61	3–0	17 – D. Scott	5 – Tied	5 – D. Morsell	Xfinity Center (0); College Park, MD
~~December 1, 2020~~*; ~~7:00 p.m.~~, ~~BTN~~		~~Monmouth~~	Canceled due to COVID-19					~~Xfinity Center~~; ~~College Park, MD~~
~~December 1, 2020~~*; ~~7:00 p.m.~~, ~~BTN~~		~~Towson~~	Canceled due to COVID-19					~~Xfinity Center~~; ~~College Park, MD~~
~~December 4, 2020~~*; ~~3:00 p.m.~~, ~~BTN~~		~~George Mason~~	Canceled due to COVID-19					~~Xfinity Center~~; ~~College Park, MD~~
December 4, 2020*; 3:00 p.m., BTN		Saint Peter's	W 90–57	4–0	32 – H. Hart	12 – D. Scott	6 – A. Wiggins	Xfinity Center (0); College Park, MD
~~December 5, 2020~~*; ~~3:00 p.m.~~, ~~NBCSW~~		at ~~James Madison~~	Canceled due to COVID-19					~~Atlantic Union Bank Center~~; ~~Harrisonburg, Virginia~~
December 9, 2020*; 5:00 p.m., ESPN2		at Clemson; ACC–Big Ten Challenge	L 51–67	4–1	11 – D. Scott	6 – Tied	4 – R. Mona	Littlejohn Coliseum (1,876); Clemson, SC
December 14, 2020; 6:00 p.m., BTN		No. 19 Rutgers	L 60–74	4–2 (0–1)	20 – D. Scott	8 – Tied	3 – A. Wiggins	Xfinity Center (0); College Park, MD
December 22, 2020*; 7:00 p.m., BTN		La Salle	W 84–71	5–2	23 – E. Ayala	9 – A. Wiggins	3 – Tied	Xfinity Center (0); College Park, MD
December 25, 2020; 2:30 p.m., FS1		at Purdue	L 70–73	5–3 (0–2)	15 – D. Scott	8 – D. Scott	4 – D. Morsell	Mackey Arena (250); West Lafayette, Indiana
December 28, 2020; 7:00 p.m., FS1		at No. 6 Wisconsin	W 70–64	6–3 (1–2)	17 – E. Ayala	9 – A. Wiggins	2 – Tied	Kohl Center (0); Madison, Wisconsin
December 31, 2020; 8:00 p.m., ESPN		No. 16 Michigan	L 73–84	6–4 (1–3)	19 – D. Scott	6 – D. Scott	6 – A. Wiggins	Xfinity Center (0); College Park, MD
January 4, 2021; 8:00 p.m., BTN		at Indiana	L 55–63	6–5 (1–4)	22 – A. Wiggins	12 – D. Scott	3 – D. Scott	Simon Skjodt Assembly Hall (0); Bloomington, Indiana
January 7, 2021; 7:00 p.m., ESPN2		No. 5 Iowa	L 67–89	6–6 (1–5)	17 – A. Wiggins	8 – D. Scott	5 – A. Wiggins	Xfinity Center (0); College Park, MD
January 10, 2021; 8:00 p.m., BTN		at No. 12 Illinois	W 66–63	7–6 (2–5)	19 – D. Morsell	8 – D. Scott	3 – D. Morsell	State Farm Center (169); Champaign, Illinois
January 15, 2021*; 12:00 p.m., BTN+		Wingate University	W 100–58	8–6	21 – A. Wiggins	6 – A. Wiggins	6 – H. Hart	Xfinity Center (0); College Park, MD
January 19, 2021; 7:00 p.m., FS1		at No. 7 Michigan	L 63–87	8–7 (2–6)	13 – D. Scott	4 – Tied	3 – H. Hart	Crisler Center (65); Ann Arbor, Michigan
January 23, 2021; 2:00 p.m., BTN		at No. 17 Minnesota	W 63–49	9–7 (3–6)	21 – E. Ayala	11 – D. Scott	4 – A. Wiggins	Williams Arena (44); Minneapolis, MN
January 27, 2021; 9:00 p.m., BTN		No. 14 Wisconsin	L 55–61	9–8 (3–7)	18 – A. Wiggins	8 – D. Scott	5 – D. Morsell	Xfinity Center (0); College Park, MD
February 2, 2021; 6:30 p.m., BTN		No. 24 Purdue	W 61–60	10–8 (4–7)	18 – A. Wiggins	11 – A. Wiggins	5 – E. Ayala	Xfinity Center (0); College Park, MD
February 5, 2021; 7:00 p.m., FS1		at Penn State	L 50–55	10–9 (4–8)	23 – E. Ayala	4 – Tied	2 – D. Morsell	Bryce Jordan Center (279); University Park, PA
February 8, 2021; 9:00 p.m., FS1		No. 4 Ohio State	L 65–73	10–10 (4–9)	17 – A. Wiggins	7 – E. Ayala	6 – A. Wiggins	Xfinity Center (0); College Park, MD
February 14, 2021; 7:00 p.m., FS1		Minnesota	W 72–59	11–10 (5–9)	17 – A. Wiggins	11 – D. Scott	4 – G. Smith	Xfinity Center (0); College Park, MD
February 16, 2021; 7:00 p.m., BTN		Nebraska	W 64–50	12–10 (6–9)	21 – A. Wiggins	11 – A. Wiggins	3 – H. Hart	Xfinity Center (0); College Park, MD
February 17, 2021; 7:00 p.m., BTN		Nebraska	W 79–71	13–10 (7–9)	24 – E. Ayala	8 – Tied	8 – D. Scott	Xfinity Center (0); College Park, MD
February 21, 2021; 3:00 p.m., BTN		at Rutgers	W 68–59	14–10 (8–9)	14 – E. Ayala	10 – A. Wiggins	4 – H. Hart	Rutgers Athletic Center (0); Piscataway, NJ
February 28, 2021; 2:00 p.m., CBS		Michigan State	W 73–55	15–10 (9–9)	22 – E. Ayala	8 – D. Scott	5 – D. Scott	Xfinity Center (0); College Park, MD
March 3, 2021; 9:00 p.m., BTN		at Northwestern	L 55–60	15–11 (9–10)	26 – A. Wiggins	8 – H. Hart	5 – D. Morsell	Welsh–Ryan Arena (0); Evanston, Illinois
March 7, 2021; 7:00 p.m., BTN		Penn State	L 61–66	15–12 (9–11)	15 – A. Wiggins	10 – A. Wiggins	3 – Tied	Xfinity Center (0); College Park, MD
Big Ten tournament
March 11, 2021; 11:30 a.m., BTN	(8)	vs. (9) Michigan State; Second Round	W 68–57	16–12	21 – E. Ayala	9 – E. Ayala	4 – E. Ayala	Lucas Oil Stadium (6,206); Indianapolis, IN
March 12, 2021; 11:30 a.m., BTN	(8)	vs. (1) No. 4 Michigan; Quarterfinals	L 66–79	16–13	19 – E. Ayala	7 – A. Wiggins	5 – A. Wiggins	Lucas Oil Stadium (7,634); Indianapolis, IN
NCAA Tournament
March 20, 2021*; 7:10 pm, CBS	(10 E)	vs. (7 E) UConn; First Round	W 63–54	17–13	23 – E. Ayala	7 – D. Morsell	4 – Tied	Mackey Arena (1,032); West Lafayette, IN
March 22, 2021*; 8:45 pm, TNT	(10 E)	vs. (2 E) No. 5 Alabama; Second Round	L 77–96	17–14	27 – A. Wiggins	6 – Tied	5 – D. Scott	Bankers Life Fieldhouse (2,226); Indianapolis, IN
*Non-conference game. ^{#}Rankings from AP Poll. (#) Tournament seedings in parentheses. All times are in Eastern Time.

== Rankings ==
Ranking movements Legend: ██ Increase in ranking ██ Decrease in ranking — = Not ranked RV = Received votes
	Week																	
Poll	Pre	1	2	3	4	5	6	7	8	9	10	11	12	13	14	15	16	Final
AP	—	—	RV	RV	—	—	—	—	—	—	—	—	—	—	RV	—	—	Not released
Coaches	—	—	—	RV	RV	—	—	—	—	—	—	—	—	—	RV	—	—	RV

*AP does not release post-NCAA Tournament rankings
*Coaches did not release a Week 2 poll.
