= 2020–21 Purdue Boilermakers men's basketball team =

American college basketball season

2020–21 Purdue Boilermakers men's basketball

NCAA tournament, first round
- Conference: Big Ten Conference

Ranking
- AP: No. 20
- Record: 18–10 (13–6 Big Ten)
- Head coach: Matt Painter (16th season)
- Assistant coaches: Brandon Brantley (8th season); Steve Lutz (4th season); Micah Shrewsberry (2nd season)
- Home arena: Mackey Arena

2020–21 Big Ten Conference men's basketball standings
	Conf.				Overall
Team	W		L	PCT	W		L	PCT
No. 4 Michigan	14	–	3	.824	23	–	5	.821
No. 2 Illinois †	16	–	4	.800	24	–	7	.774
No. 8 Iowa	14	–	6	.700	22	–	9	.710
No. 20 Purdue	13	–	6	.684	18	–	10	.643
No. 7 Ohio State	12	–	8	.600	21	–	10	.677
Wisconsin	10	–	10	.500	18	–	13	.581
Rutgers	10	–	10	.500	16	–	12	.571
Maryland	9	–	11	.450	17	–	14	.548
Michigan State	9	–	11	.450	15	–	13	.536
Indiana	7	–	12	.368	12	–	15	.444
Penn State	7	–	12	.368	11	–	14	.440
Northwestern	6	–	13	.316	9	–	15	.375
Minnesota	6	–	14	.300	14	–	15	.483
Nebraska	3	–	16	.158	7	–	20	.259
† Conference tournament winner Rankings from AP poll

The 2020–21 Purdue Boilermakers men's basketball team represented Purdue University in the 2020–21 NCAA Division I men's basketball season. Their head coach was Matt Painter in his 16th season with the Boilermakers. The Boilers played their home games at Mackey Arena in West Lafayette, Indiana as members of the Big Ten Conference. They finished the season 18–10, 13–6 in Big Ten play to finish in fourth place. They lost in the quarterfinals of the Big Ten tournament to Ohio State. They received an at-large bid to the NCAA tournament as the No. 4 seed in the South region. They were upset in the first round by No. 13-seeded North Texas.

== Previous season ==
The Boilermakers finished the 2019–20 season 16–15, 9–11 in Big Ten play to finish in a tie for 10th place. Due to tie-breaking rules, they received the No. 10 seed in the Big Ten tournament before the tournament was canceled due to the coronavirus pandemic.

== Offseason ==
=== Departures ===
Name	Number	Pos.	Height	Weight	Year	Hometown	Reason for departure
Evan Boudreaux	12	F	6'8"	220 lbs.	Senior	Lake Forest, Illinois	Graduated
Tommy Luce	15	G	5'10"	155 lbs.	Senior	Jeffersonville, Indiana	Graduated
Jahaad Proctor	3	G	6'3"	205 lbs.	Senior	Harrisburg, Pennsylvania	Graduated
Matt Haarms	32	C	7'3"	250 lbs.	Junior	Amsterdam, the Netherlands	Transferred to BYU
Nojel Eastern	20	G	6'6"	220 lbs.	Junior	Evanston, Illinois	Transferred to Howard

=== Recruiting classes ===
==== 2020 recruiting class ====
College recruiting
Name	Hometown	School	Height	Weight	Commit date
Jaden Ivey; SG	South Bend, IN	La Lumiere School (IN)	6 ft 4 in (1.93 m)	190 lb (86 kg)	Apr 24, 2019
Jaden Ivey; SG	Recruit ratings: Rivals: 247Sports: ESPN: (83)				
Ethan Morton; SG	Butler, PA	Butler Area (PA)	6 ft 4 in (1.93 m)	215 lb (98 kg)	May 9, 2019
Ethan Morton; SG	Recruit ratings: Rivals: 247Sports: ESPN: (83)				
Zach Edey; C	Toronto, ON	IMG Academy (FL)	7 ft 3 in (2.21 m)	285 lb (129 kg)	Nov 9, 2019
Zach Edey; C	Recruit ratings: Rivals: 247Sports: ESPN: (75)				
Overall recruit ranking: Rivals: 46 247Sports: 33 ESPN: —
Note: In many cases, Scout, Rivals, 247Sports, On3, and ESPN may conflict in their listings of height and weight.; In these cases, the average was taken. ESPN grades are on a 100-point scale.; Sources: "Purdue 2020 Basketball Commitments". Rivals.; "2020 Purdue Boilermakers Recruiting Class". ESPN.; "2020 Team Ranking". Rivals.

==== 2021 recruiting class ====
College recruiting (2021)
Name	Hometown	School	Height	Weight	Commit date
Caleb Furst; PF / C	Fort Wayne, IN	Blackhawk Christian School (IN)	6 ft 9 in (2.06 m)	215 lb (98 kg)	Mar 2, 2020
Caleb Furst; PF / C	Recruit ratings: Rivals: 247Sports: ESPN: (84)				
Trey Kaufman; PF	Sellersburg, IN	Silver Creek (IN)	6 ft 8 in (2.03 m)	210 lb (95 kg)	Oct 30, 2020
Trey Kaufman; PF	Recruit ratings: Rivals: 247Sports: ESPN: (86)				
Overall recruit ranking: Rivals: — 247Sports: 34 ESPN: —
Note: In many cases, Scout, Rivals, 247Sports, On3, and ESPN may conflict in their listings of height and weight.; In these cases, the average was taken. ESPN grades are on a 100-point scale.; Sources: "Purdue 2021 Basketball Commitments". Rivals.; "2021 Purdue Boilermakers Recruiting Class". ESPN.; "2021 Team Ranking". Rivals.

== Roster ==
2020–21 Purdue Boilermakers men's basketball team
Players
Coaches

Pos.	#	Name	Height	Weight	Year	Previous school	Hometown
F	0	Mason Gillis	6 ft 6 in (1.98 m)	230 lb (104 kg)	RS Fr	New Castle HS	New Castle, IN
F	1	Aaron Wheeler	6 ft 9 in (2.06 m)	205 lb (93 kg)	RS Jr	Brewster Academy	Stamford, CT
G	2	Eric Hunter Jr.	6 ft 4 in (1.93 m)	170 lb (77 kg)	Jr	Tindley Prep	Indianapolis, IN
C	4	Emmanuel Dowuona	6 ft 10 in (2.08 m)	245 lb (111 kg)	RS So	Westwood Christian School	Miami, FL
G	5	Brandon Newman	6 ft 5 in (1.96 m)	195 lb (88 kg)	RS Fr	Valparaiso HS	Valparaiso, IN
G	11	Isaiah Thompson	6 ft 1 in (1.85 m)	160 lb (73 kg)	So	Zionsville HS	Zionsville, IN
G	14	Jared Wulbrun (W)	5 ft 10 in (1.78 m)	170 lb (77 kg)	Jr	Cal Lutheran	Stanford, CA
C	15	Zach Edey	7 ft 4 in (2.24 m)	285 lb (129 kg)	Fr	IMG Academy	Toronto, ON
F	21	Matt Frost (W)	6 ft 5 in (1.96 m)	200 lb (91 kg)	So	Columbus East HS	Columbus, IN
G	22	Chase Martin (W)	6 ft 3 in (1.91 m)	195 lb (88 kg)	Fr	Tolton HS	Columbia, MO
G	23	Jaden Ivey	6 ft 4 in (1.93 m)	200 lb (91 kg)	Fr	La Lumiere School	South Bend, IN
G	25	Ethan Morton	6 ft 6 in (1.98 m)	215 lb (98 kg)	Fr	Butler Area HS	Butler, PA
G	34	Carson Barrett (W)	6 ft 5 in (1.96 m)	215 lb (98 kg)	Fr	Lafayette Central Catholic HS	Lafayette, IN
F	50	Trevion Williams	6 ft 10 in (2.08 m)	265 lb (120 kg)	Jr	Henry Ford Academy	Chicago, IL
G	55	Sasha Stefanovic	6 ft 5 in (1.96 m)	200 lb (91 kg)	RS Jr	Crown Point HS	Crown Point, IN

Head coach

- Matt Painter (Purdue)

Assistant coach(es)

- Micah Shrewsberry (Hanover)
- Steve Lutz (Texas Lutheran)
- Brandon Brantley (Purdue)

Legend

- (C) Team captain
- (S) Suspended
- (I) Ineligible
- (W) Walk-on
- Injured
- Current redshirt

Roster

== Schedule and results ==
Date time, TV	Rank^{#}	Opponent^{#}	Result	Record	High points	High rebounds	High assists	Site (attendance) city, state
Regular season
November 20, 2020*; 5:30 pm, CBSSN		vs. Liberty; Space Coast Challenge	W 77–64	1–0	19 – Edey	11 – Williams	5 – Tied	Titan Field House (0); Melbourne, FL
November 26, 2020*; 8:30 pm, CBSSN		vs. Clemson; Space Coast Challenge	L 70–81	1–1	17 – Edey	8 – Tied	5 – Morton	Titan Field House (0); Melbourne, FL
December 1, 2020*; 3:00 pm, BTN		Oakland	W 93–50	2–1	21 – Newman	14 – Williams	7 – Stefanovic	Mackey Arena (0); West Lafayette, IN
December 4, 2020*; 7:00 pm, BTN		Valparaiso	W 68–61	3–1	19 – Stefanovic	11 – Williams	3 – Tied	Mackey Arena (200); West Lafayette, IN
December 8, 2020*; 5:00 pm, ESPN2		at Miami (FL); ACC–Big Ten Challenge	L 54–58	3–2	15 – Edey	7 – Williams	3 – Gillis	Watsco Center (0); Miami, FL
December 12, 2020*; 7:30 pm, BTN		Indiana State	W 80–68	4–2	30 – Williams	13 – Wheeler	5 – Hunter Jr.	Mackey Arena (200); West Lafayette, IN
December 16, 2020; 7:00 pm, BTN		No. 20 Ohio State	W 67–60	5–2 (1–0)	16 – Williams	9 – Williams	8 – Williams	Mackey Arena (250); West Lafayette, IN
December 19, 2020*; 2:30 pm, ESPN2		vs. Notre Dame; Crossroads Classic	W 88–78	6–2	18 – Tied	9 – Gillis	8 – Hunter Jr.	Bankers Life Fieldhouse (0); Indianapolis, IN
December 22, 2020; 9:00 pm, BTN		at No. 4 Iowa	L 55–70	6–3 (1–1)	14 – Williams	9 – Williams	5 – Hunter Jr.	Carver–Hawkeye Arena (536); Iowa City, IA
December 25, 2020; 2:30 pm, FS1		Maryland	W 73–70	7–3 (2–1)	17 – Newman	8 – Williams	4 – Ivey	Mackey Arena (250); West Lafayette, IN
December 29, 2020; 7:00 pm, FS1		at No. 14 Rutgers	L 76–81	7–4 (2–2)	21 – Williams	12 – Williams	3 – Tied	The RAC (0); Piscataway, NJ
January 2, 2021; 6:00 pm, BTN		at No. 15 Illinois	L 58–66	7–5 (2–3)	14 – Tied	8 – Williams	4 – Hunter Jr.	State Farm Center (167); Champaign, IL
January 5, 2021; 5:00 pm, BTN		Nebraska	Game postponed due to COVID-19 issues					Mackey Arena; West Lafayette, IN
January 8, 2021; 7:00 pm, FS1		at No. 23 Michigan State	W 55–54	8–5 (3–3)	26 – Williams	9 – Williams	4 – Hunter Jr.	Breslin Center (0); East Lansing, MI
January 14, 2021; 7:00 pm, FS1		at Indiana	W 81–69	9–5 (4–3)	22 – Williams	10 – Williams	4 – Hunter Jr.	Assembly Hall (0); Bloomington, IN
January 17, 2021; 1:00 pm, BTN		Penn State	W 80–72	10–5 (5–3)	15 – Stefanovic	11 – Williams	5 – Hunter Jr.	Mackey Arena (168); West Lafayette, IN
January 19, 2021; 6:30 pm, BTN		at No. 15 Ohio State	W 67–65	11–5 (6–3)	16 – Williams	7 – Williams	2 – Ivey	Value City Arena (0); Columbus, OH
January 22, 2021; 7:00 pm, FS1		No. 7 Michigan	L 53–70	11–6 (6–4)	14 – Williams	11 – Williams	5 – Ivey	Mackey Arena (250); West Lafayette, IN
January 30, 2021; 7:30 pm, BTN		No. 21 Minnesota	W 81–62	12–6 (7–4)	29 – Newman	14 – Williams	7 – Hunter Jr.	Mackey Arena (250); West Lafayette, IN
February 2, 2021; 6:30 pm, BTN	No. 24	at Maryland	L 60–61	12–7 (7–5)	23 – Williams	11 – Williams	3 – Ivey	Xfinity Center (0); College Park, MD
February 6, 2021; 4:30 pm, BTN	No. 24	Northwestern	W 75–70	13–7 (8–5)	20 – Ivey	11 – Edey	3 – Tied	Mackey Arena (250); West Lafayette, IN
February 11, 2021; 5:00 pm, ESPN2	No. 24	at Minnesota	L 68–71	13–8 (8–6)	24 – Williams	10 – Williams	4 – Ivey	Williams Arena (44); Minneapolis, MN
February 16, 2021; 7:00 pm, ESPN		Michigan State	W 75–65	14–8 (9–6)	28 – Williams	6 – Williams	3 – Tied	Mackey Arena (250); West Lafayette, IN
February 20, 2021; 5:30 pm, BTN		at Nebraska	W 75–58	15–8 (10–6)	15 – Ivey	7 – Tied	4 – Hunter Jr.	Pinnacle Bank Arena (0); Lincoln, NE
February 26, 2021; 7:00 pm, FS1		at Penn State	W 73–52	16–8 (11–6)	16 – Stefanovic	7 – Wheeler	4 – Williams	Bryce Jordan Center (261); University Park, PA
March 2, 2021; 9:00 pm, ESPN2	No. 23	No. 25 Wisconsin	W 73–69	17–8 (12–6)	21 – Edey	7 – Tied	8 – Stefanovic	Mackey Arena (250); West Lafayette, IN
March 6, 2021; 2:00 pm, ESPN	No. 23	Indiana	W 67–58	18–8 (13–6)	20 – Edey	9 – Edey	6 – Stefanovic	Mackey Arena (250); West Lafayette, IN
Big Ten tournament
March 12, 2021; 2:00 pm, BTN	(4) No. 20	vs. (5) No. 9 Ohio State; Quarterfinals	L 78–87 ^{OT}	18–9	26 – Williams	14 – Williams	5 – Williams	Lucas Oil Stadium (7,634); Indianapolis, IN
NCAA tournament
March 19, 2021; 7:25 pm, TNT	(4 S) No. 20	vs. (13 S) North Texas; First Round	L 69–78 ^{OT}	18–10	26 – Ivey	13 – Williams	5 – Williams	Lucas Oil Stadium; Indianapolis, IN
*Non-conference game. ^{#}Rankings from AP Poll. (#) Tournament seedings in parentheses. S=South. All times are in Eastern Time.

== Rankings ==
Ranking movements Legend: ██ Increase in ranking ██ Decrease in ranking — = Not ranked RV = Received votes т = Tied with team above or below
	Week																
Poll	Pre	1	2	3	4	5	6	7	8	9	10	11	12	13	14	15	Final
AP	—	—	—	—	RV	—	—	—	RV	24	24	RV	RV	23	20т	20	Not released
Coaches	RV	RV^	—	—	RV	RV	—	—	RV	RV	25	RV	RV	23	19т	20	RV

*AP does not release post-NCAA Tournament rankings
^Coaches did not release a Week 1 poll.
