= CJ Walker (basketball) =

American basketball player (born 1997)

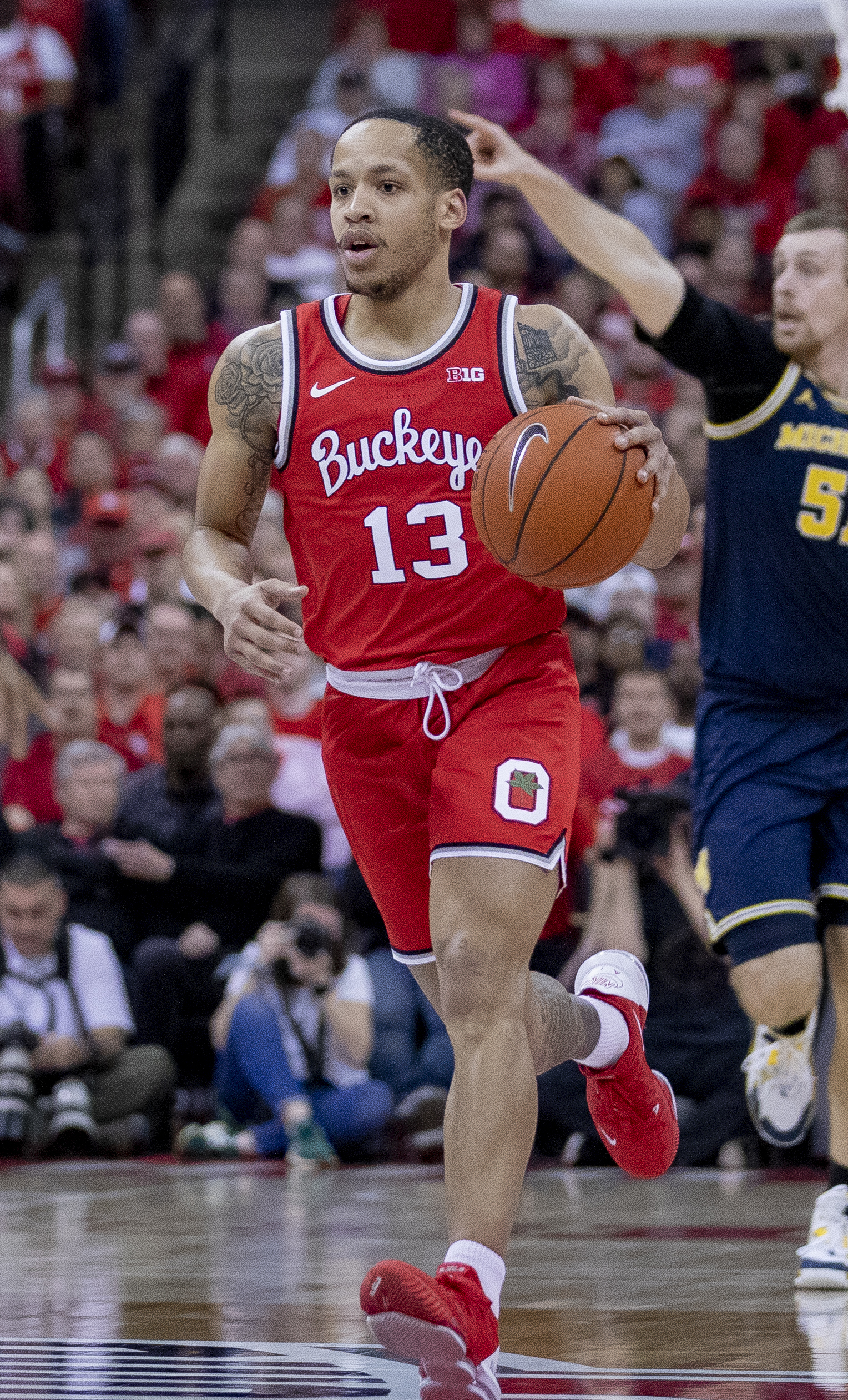
- Walker with Ohio State in 2020

Personal information
- Born: March 24, 1997 (age 29) Indianapolis, Indiana, U.S.
- Listed height: 6 ft 1 in (1.85 m)
- Listed weight: 195 lb (88 kg)

Career information
- High school: Arsenal Tech (Indianapolis, Indiana)
- College: Florida State (2016–2018); Ohio State (2018–2021)
- NBA draft: 2021: undrafted
- Playing career: 2021–2022
- Position: Point guard
- Number: 11

Career history
- 2021–2022: Phoenix Hagen

Clarence Andre Walker (born March 24, 1997) is an American former professional basketball player. He played college basketball for the Florida State Seminoles and the Ohio State Buckeyes.

== Early life ==
Walker was raised in Indianapolis, Indiana and attended Arsenal Technical High School in Indianapolis. During his senior season, he won the Indianapolis Coaches Association Player of the Year. His senior season averages were 24.3 points, 5.6 assists and three steals per game.

Walker committed to Florida State on June 20, 2015, over offers from Walker's future head coach at Ohio State Chris Holtmann at Butler, Illinois, and Cincinnati.

College recruiting
Name	Hometown	School	Height	Weight	Commit date
CJ Walker; PG	Indianapolis, IN	Arsenal Tech (IN)	6 ft 0 in (1.83 m)	180 lb (82 kg)	Jun 20, 2015
CJ Walker; PG	Recruit ratings: Rivals: 247Sports: ESPN: (81)				
Overall recruit ranking: Rivals: 124 247Sports: 185 ESPN: —
Note: In many cases, Scout, Rivals, 247Sports, On3, and ESPN may conflict in their listings of height and weight.; In these cases, the average was taken. ESPN grades are on a 100-point scale.; Sources: "Florida State 2016 Basketball Commitments". Rivals.; "2016 Florida State Seminoles Recruiting Class". ESPN.; "2016 Team Ranking". Rivals.

== College career ==
=== Florida State ===
Walker played in 33 games off the bench during his freshman year, averaging 4.9 points, 1.3 assists, and 0.6 steals per game. His season-high in points during the season was 13, against Illinois and Wake Forest. He started every game except for one during his sophomore season at Florida State, averaging 8 points, 2.4 assists, and 1 steal per game. He started every game of Florida State's Elite Eight run during the 2018 NCAA tournament, averaging 17.5 minutes per game. Following the season, on March 27, 2018, he transferred from Florida State.

=== Ohio State ===
Walker committed to Ohio State on April 8, 2018. Walker sat out the 2018–19 season due to NCAA transfer rules. He had a solid season during his junior season, averaging 8.7 points, 3.5 assists, and 1.3 steals per game. He scored a season-high 18 points in a game against Nebraska on January 14, 2020.

Walker missed four games during mid-January due to a nagging hand injury. In Ohio State's Big Ten tournament championship loss, Walker scored 16 points and made a buzzer-beating three-pointer, although the three-pointer did not affect the result of the game as Illinois won the game by three points. He averaged 9.5 points, 4.4 assists, and 0.9 steals per game. His free throw percentage of 94.0% ranked second in the country.

Walker declared for the 2021 NBA draft on April 12, 2021, forgoing his option to return to college by hiring an agent.

== Professional career ==
On August 13, 2021, Walker signed his first professional contract with ETHA Engomis of the Cyprus Basketball Division A. However he parted ways with the team before playing a game. On September 27, Walker signed with Phoenix Hagen of the German ProA.

== Career statistics ==
Legend
GP	Games played	GS	Games started	MPG	Minutes per game
FG%	Field goal percentage	3P%	3-point field goal percentage	FT%	Free throw percentage
RPG	Rebounds per game	APG	Assists per game	SPG	Steals per game
BPG	Blocks per game	PPG	Points per game	**Bold**	Career high

=== College ===
Year	Team	GP	GS	MPG	FG%	3P%	FT%	RPG	APG	SPG	BPG	PPG
2016–17	Florida State	33	0	12.5	.397	.304	.655	1.4	1.3	.6	**.1**	4.9
2017–18	Florida State	**35**	**34**	23.2	.412	**.355**	.732	2.5	2.4	1.0	**.1**	8.0
2018–19	Ohio State	Redshirt										
2019–20	Ohio State	31	29	29.0	**.427**	.321	.812	3.1	3.5	**1.3**	**.1**	8.7
2020–21	Ohio State	27	12	**30.0**	.410	.265	**.940**	**3.2**	**4.4**	.9	**.1**	**9.5**
Career		126	75	23.3	.413	.321	.799	2.5	2.8	.9	.1	7.7

== Personal life ==
Walker has a daughter, Summer, in 2019 from a previous relationship. He is married to Taylor Ramey in 2022 and they had a son in 2023, Skylar. Walker serves as an assistant coach for the Girls Varsity basketball team at North Central High School in Indianapolis, Indiana.
