= 2020–21 Wisconsin Badgers men's basketball team =

American college basketball season

2020–21 Wisconsin Badgers men's basketball

NCAA tournament, Second Round
- Conference: Big Ten Conference
- Record: 18–13 (10–10 Big Ten)
- Head coach: Greg Gard (6th season)
- Assistant coaches: Howard Moore*; Joe Krabbenhoft; Dean Oliver; Alando Tucker (interim)
- Home arena: Kohl Center

2020–21 Big Ten Conference men's basketball standings
	Conf.				Overall
Team	W		L	PCT	W		L	PCT
No. 4 Michigan	14	–	3	.824	23	–	5	.821
No. 2 Illinois †	16	–	4	.800	24	–	7	.774
No. 8 Iowa	14	–	6	.700	22	–	9	.710
No. 20 Purdue	13	–	6	.684	18	–	10	.643
No. 7 Ohio State	12	–	8	.600	21	–	10	.677
Wisconsin	10	–	10	.500	18	–	13	.581
Rutgers	10	–	10	.500	16	–	12	.571
Maryland	9	–	11	.450	17	–	14	.548
Michigan State	9	–	11	.450	15	–	13	.536
Indiana	7	–	12	.368	12	–	15	.444
Penn State	7	–	12	.368	11	–	14	.440
Northwestern	6	–	13	.316	9	–	15	.375
Minnesota	6	–	14	.300	14	–	15	.483
Nebraska	3	–	16	.158	7	–	20	.259
† Conference tournament winner Rankings from AP poll

The 2020–21 Wisconsin Badgers men's basketball team represented the University of Wisconsin–Madison in the 2020–21 NCAA Division I men's basketball season. The Badgers were led by sixth-year head coach Greg Gard and played their home games at the Kohl Center in Madison, Wisconsin as members of the Big Ten Conference. They finished the season 18–13, 10–10 in Big Ten play to finish in a tie for sixth place. As the No. 6 seed in the Big Ten tournament, they defeated Penn State before losing to Iowa in the quarterfinals. They received an at-large bid to the NCAA tournament as the No. 9 seed in the South region. They defeated North Carolina in the first round before losing to No. 1-seeded (and eventual national champion) Baylor in the second round.

== Previous season ==
The Badgers finished the 2019–20 season 21–10, 14–6 in Big Ten play to finish tied for first place, winning them a share of the Big Ten championship. The 2020 Big Ten men's basketball tournament and 2020 NCAA Division I men's basketball tournament were cancelled due to the COVID-19 pandemic.

== Offseason ==
=== Departures ===
Name	Number	Pos.	Height	Weight	Year	Hometown	Reason for departure
Brevin Pritzl	1	G	6'3"	204	RS senior	De Pere, WI	Graduated
Courtland Cuevas	15	F	6'5"	190	Junior	Madison, WI	Walk-on; didn't return
Samad Qawi	20	F	6'6"	195	Junior	Racine, WI	Walk-on; didn't return
Owen Hamilton	30	C	7'0"	266	RS sophomore	Prescott, WI	Walk-on; didn't return
Michael Ballard	31	G	6'4"	204	RS Junior	Oak Park, IL	Walk-on; graduated

=== 2020 recruiting class ===
College recruiting
Name	Hometown	School	Height	Weight	Commit date
Lorne Bowman; PG	Detroit, MI	St. Mary's Preparatory	6 ft 1 in (1.85 m)	180 lb (82 kg)	Nov 16, 2018
Lorne Bowman; PG	Recruit ratings: Scout: Rivals: 247Sports: (81)				
Johnny Davis; SG	La Crosse, WI	La Crosse Central High School	6 ft 5 in (1.96 m)	188 lb (85 kg)	Jun 15, 2019
Johnny Davis; SG	Recruit ratings: Scout: Rivals: 247Sports: (79)				
Jordan Davis; SF	La Crosse, WI	La Crosse Central High School	6 ft 5 in (1.96 m)	180 lb (82 kg)	Jun 15, 2019
Jordan Davis; SF	Recruit ratings: Scout: Rivals: 247Sports: (78)				
Steven Crowl; C	Eagan, MN	Eastview High School	6 ft 9 in (2.06 m)	210 lb (95 kg)	Sep 17, 2019
Steven Crowl; C	Recruit ratings: Scout: Rivals: 247Sports: (75)				
Ben Carlson; PF	Woodbury, MN	East Ridge High School	6 ft 9 in (2.06 m)	205 lb (93 kg)	Sep 18, 2019
Ben Carlson; PF	Recruit ratings: Scout: Rivals: 247Sports: (81)				
Overall recruit ranking:
Note: In many cases, Scout, Rivals, 247Sports, On3, and ESPN may conflict in their listings of height and weight.; In these cases, the average was taken. ESPN grades are on a 100-point scale.; Sources: "2020 Wisconsin Commitments". Rivals.; "Men's Basketball Recruiting". Scout.; "ESPN- Wisconsin Badgers Men's Basketball Recruiting". ESPN.; "Scout.com Team Recruiting Rankings". Scout.; "2020 Team Ranking". Rivals.

=== 2021 recruiting class ===
College recruiting (2021)
Name	Hometown	School	Height	Weight	Commit date
Chucky Hepburn; PG	Bellevue, NE	Bellevue West High School	6 ft 1 in (1.85 m)	185 lb (84 kg)	Sep 29, 2019
Chucky Hepburn; PG	Recruit ratings: Scout: Rivals: 247Sports: (81)				
Matthew Mors; PF	Yankton, SD	Yankton High School	6 ft 7 in (2.01 m)	220 lb (100 kg)	Sep 29, 2019
Matthew Mors; PF	Recruit ratings: Scout: Rivals: 247Sports: (80)				
Chris Hodges; PF	Schaumburg, IL	Schaumburg High School	6 ft 8 in (2.03 m)	235 lb (107 kg)	Aug 15, 2019
Chris Hodges; PF	Recruit ratings: Scout: Rivals: 247Sports: (77)				
Markus Ilver; PF	Tallinn, Estonia	Western Reserve Academy	6 ft 8 in (2.03 m)	195 lb (88 kg)	Jan 13, 2021
Markus Ilver; PF	Recruit ratings: Scout: Rivals: 247Sports: (80)				
Overall recruit ranking:
Note: In many cases, Scout, Rivals, 247Sports, On3, and ESPN may conflict in their listings of height and weight.; In these cases, the average was taken. ESPN grades are on a 100-point scale.; Sources: "2021 Wisconsin Commitments". Rivals.; "Men's Basketball Recruiting". Scout.; "ESPN- Wisconsin Badgers Men's Basketball Recruiting". ESPN.; "Scout.com Team Recruiting Rankings". Scout.; "2021 Team Ranking". Rivals.

== Roster ==
2020–21 Wisconsin Badgers men's basketball team
Players
Coaches

Pos.	#	Name	Height	Weight	Year	Previous school	Hometown
G	0	D'Mitrik Trice	6 ft 0 in (1.83 m)	184 lb (83 kg)	RS Sr	Wayne High School (OH)	Huber Heights, Ohio
G	1	Johnny Davis	6 ft 5 in (1.96 m)	196 lb (89 kg)	Fr	La Crosse Central High School	La Crosse, Wisconsin
F	2	Aleem Ford	6 ft 8 in (2.03 m)	217 lb (98 kg)	RS Sr	Archer High School	Lawrenceville, Georgia
G	3	Walt McGrory (W)	6 ft 3 in (1.91 m)	205 lb (93 kg)	Sr	Edina High School	Minneapolis, Minnesota
G	4	Carter Higginbottom (W)	6 ft 0 in (1.83 m)	188 lb (85 kg)	RS So	St. Ignatius College Prep (IL)	Chicago, Illinois
F	5	Tyler Wahl	6 ft 9 in (2.06 m)	220 lb (100 kg)	So	North High School	Lakeville, Minnesota
G	10	Lorne Bowman II	6 ft 2 in (1.88 m)	180 lb (82 kg)	Fr	St. Mary's High School	Detroit, Michigan
F	11	Micah Potter	6 ft 10 in (2.08 m)	248 lb (112 kg)	RS Sr	Montverde Academy/Ohio State	Mentor, Ohio
G	12	Trevor Anderson	6 ft 3 in (1.91 m)	195 lb (88 kg)	RS Sr	Stevens Point H.S./Green Bay	Stevens Point, Wisconsin
G	13	Justin Taphorn (W)	6 ft 5 in (1.96 m)	198 lb (90 kg)	Fr	Perkin High School	Pekin, Illinois
F	14	Carter Gilmore (W)	6 ft 7 in (2.01 m)	215 lb (98 kg)	Fr	Arrowhead High School	Hartland, Wisconsin
F	20	Ben Carlson	6 ft 9 in (2.06 m)	218 lb (99 kg)	Fr	East Ridge High School	Woodbury, Minnesota
F	22	Steven Crowl	7 ft 0 in (2.13 m)	217 lb (98 kg)	Fr	Eastview High School	Eagan, Minnesota
G	24	Jordan Davis	6 ft 4 in (1.93 m)	202 lb (92 kg)	Fr	La Crosse Central High School	La Crosse, Wisconsin
C	32	Joe Hedstrom	7 ft 0 in (2.13 m)	247 lb (112 kg)	RS So	Hopkins High School	Hopkins, Minnesota
G	34	Brad Davison	6 ft 4 in (1.93 m)	202 lb (92 kg)	Sr	Maple Grove High School	Maple Grove, Minnesota
F	35	Nate Reuvers	6 ft 11 in (2.11 m)	235 lb (107 kg)	Sr	Lakeville North High School	Lakeville, Minnesota

Head coach

- Greg Gard (UW-Platteville)

Assistant coach(es)

- Joe Krabbenhoft (Wisconsin)
- Dean Oliver (Iowa)
- Alando Tucker (Wisconsin)

Legend

- (C) Team captain
- (S) Suspended
- (I) Ineligible
- (W) Walk-on
- Injured
- Current redshirt

Roster

== Schedule and results ==
Date time, TV	Rank^{#}	Opponent^{#}	Result	Record	High points	High rebounds	High assists	Site (attendance) city, state
Non-conference regular season
November 25, 2020*; 9:00 p.m., BTN	No. 7	Eastern Illinois	W 77–67	1–0	18 – Reuvers	9 – Reuvers	5 – Trice	Kohl Center; Madison, WI
November 27, 2020*; 8:00 p.m., BTN	No. 7	Arkansas–Pine Bluff	W 92–58	2–0	19 – Potter	8 – Jon. Davis	3 – Tied	Kohl Center; Madison, WI
December 1, 2020*; 4:00 p.m., BTN	No. 4	Green Bay	W 82–42	3–0	14 – Potter	15 – Wahl	5 – Trice	Kohl Center; Madison, WI
December 4, 2020*; 6:00 p.m., FS1	No. 4	at Marquette; Rivalry	L 65–67	3–1	17 – Trice	6 – Tied	3 – Davison	Fiserv Forum; Milwaukee, WI
December 9, 2020*; 3:30 p.m., BTN	No. 13	Rhode Island	W 73–62	4–1	23 – Davison	7 – Potter	4 – Trice	Kohl Center; Madison, WI
December 15, 2020*; 7:00 p.m., BTN	No. 12	Loyola-Chicago	W 77–63	5–1	17 – Tied	7 – Potter	2 – Tied	Kohl Center; Madison, WI
December 16, 2020*; 8:00 p.m., BTN	No. 12	Northern Iowa	Cancelled due to COVID-19 issues					Kohl Center; Madison, WI
December 19, 2020*; 11:00 a.m., ESPN2	No. 12	No. 23 Louisville; ACC–Big Ten Challenge	W 85–48	6–1	20 – Potter	7 – Potter	5 – Trice	Kohl Center; Madison, WI
Big Ten regular season
December 22, 2020; 6:00 p.m., FS1	No. 9	Nebraska	W 67–53	7–1 (1–0)	15 – Davison	11 – Potter	7 – Davison	Kohl Center; Madison, WI
December 25, 2020; 11:30 a.m., FOX	No. 9	at No. 12 Michigan State; Christmas Day	W 85–76	8–1 (2–0)	29 – Trice	6 – Potter	5 – Potter	Breslin Center; Lansing, MI
December 28, 2020; 6:00 p.m., FS1	No. 6	Maryland	L 64–70	8–2 (2–1)	25 – Trice	6 – Tied	4 – Davison	Kohl Center; Madison, WI
December 31, 2020; 3:30 p.m., BTN	No. 6	No. 21 Minnesota; New Year's Eve	W 71–59	9–2 (3–1)	18 – Potter	11 – Potter	5 – Trice	Kohl Center; Madison, WI
January 7, 2021; 6:00 p.m., FS1	No. 8	Indiana	W 80–73 ^{2OT}	10–2 (4–1)	21 – Trice	8 – Jon. Davis	7 – Trice	Kohl Center; Madison, WI
January 12, 2021; 6:00 p.m., ESPN	No. 9	at No. 7 Michigan	L 54–77	10–3 (4–2)	20 – Trice	6 – Tied	3 – Anderson	Crisler Center (74); Ann Arbor, MI
January 15, 2021; 7:30 p.m., FS1	No. 9	at Rutgers	W 60–54	11–3 (5–2)	14 – Tied	8 – Potter	5 – Trice	Louis Brown Athletic Center; Piscataway, NJ
January 20, 2021; 8:00 p.m., BTN	No. 10	Northwestern	W 68–52	12–3 (6–2)	14 – Wahl	6 – Tied	4 – Trice	Kohl Center; Madison, WI
January 23, 2021; 3:00 p.m., CBS	No. 10	No. 15 Ohio State	L 62–74	12–4 (6–3)	13 – Ford	7 – Ford	8 – Trice	Kohl Center; Madison, WI
January 27, 2021; 8:00 p.m., BTN	No. 14	at Maryland	W 61–55	13–4 (7–3)	23 – Potter	12 – Potter	3 – Tied	Xfinity Center; College Park, MD
January 30, 2021; 2:00 p.m., BTN	No. 14	at Penn State	L 71–81	13–5 (7–4)	18 – Reuvers	10 – Wahl	3 – Tied	Bryce Jordan Center (260); University Park, PA
February 2, 2021; 7:30 p.m., BTN	No. 19	Penn State	W 72–56	14–5 (8–4)	17 – Jon. Davis	8 – Potter	6 – Trice	Kohl Center; Madison, WI
February 6, 2021; 1:30 p.m., FOX	No. 19	at No. 12 Illinois	L 60–75	14–6 (8–5)	22 – Trice	4 – Tied	3 – Ford	State Farm Center (180); Champaign, IL
February 10, 2021; 8:30 p.m., BTN	No. 21	at Nebraska	W 61–48	15–6 (9–5)	10 – Jon. Davis	8 – Trice	3 – Tied	Pinnacle Bank Arena; Lincoln, NE
February 14, 2021; 12:00 p.m., CBS	No. 21	No. 3 Michigan	L 59–67	15–7 (9–6)	16 – Trice	6 – Tied	4 – Anderson	Kohl Center; Madison, WI
February 18, 2021; 6:00 p.m., ESPN	No. 21	No. 11 Iowa	L 62–77	15–8 (9–7)	23 – Potter	11 – Potter	9 – Trice	Kohl Center; Madison, WI
February 21, 2021; 6:00 p.m., BTN	No. 21	at Northwestern	W 68–51	16–8 (10–7)	19 – Potter	8 – Potter	5 – Trice	Welsh–Ryan Arena; Evanston, IL
February 27, 2021; 1:00 p.m., ESPN	No. 23	No. 5 Illinois	L 69–74	16–9 (10–8)	29 – Trice	6 – Potter	2 – Tied	Kohl Center; Madison, WI
March 2, 2021; 8:00 p.m., ESPN2	No. 25	at No. 23 Purdue	L 69–73	16–10 (10–9)	15 – Davison	10 – Wahl	4 – Trice	Mackey Arena (250); West Lafayette, IN
March 7, 2021; 11:30 a.m., FOX	No. 25	at No. 5 Iowa	L 73–77	16–11 (10–10)	23 – Potter	5 – Davison	4 – Davison	Carver–Hawkeye Arena (582); Iowa City, IA
Big Ten tournament
March 11, 2021; 8:00 p.m., BTN	(6)	vs. (11) Penn State; Second Round	W 75–74	17–11	17 – Ford	5 – Wahl	9 – Trice	Lucas Oil Stadium (6,769); Indianapolis, IN
March 12, 2021; 8:00 p.m., BTN	(6)	vs. (3) No. 5 Iowa; Quarterfinals	L 57–62	17–12	19 – Trice	8 – Tied	3 – Tied	Lucas Oil Stadium (7,735); Indianapolis, IN
NCAA tournament
March 19, 2021*; 6:10 p.m., CBS	(9 S)	vs. (8 S) North Carolina; First Round	W 85–62	18–12	29 – Davison	6 – Tied	3 – Tied	Mackey Arena (1,182); West Lafayette, IN
March 21, 2021*; 1:40 p.m., CBS	(9 S)	vs. (1 S) No. 3 Baylor; Second Round	L 63–76	18–13	12 – Trice	10 – Potter	4 – Tied	Hinkle Fieldhouse (1,098); Indianapolis, IN
*Non-conference game. ^{#}Rankings from AP Poll. (#) Tournament seedings in parentheses. All times are in Central Time.

== Rankings ==
Ranking movements Legend: ██ Increase in ranking ██ Decrease in ranking — = Not ranked RV = Received votes т = Tied with team above or below
	Week																	
Poll	Pre	1	2	3	4	5	6	7	8	9	10	11	12	13	14	15	16	Final
AP	7	4	13т	12	9	6	8	9	10	14	19	21	21	23	25	RV	RV	Not released
Coaches	7	7^	13	12	9	7	10	9	10	13	20	21	21	24	RV	RV	—	RV

*AP does not release post-NCAA Tournament rankings
^Coaches did not release a Week 1 poll.

== Player statistics ==
Individual player statistics (final)
			Minutes		Scoring		Total FGs			3-point FGs			Free throws			Rebounds								
Player	GP	GS	Tot	Avg	Pts	Avg	FG	FGA	Pct	3FG	3FA	Pct	FT	FTA	Pct	Off	Def	Tot	Avg	A	TO	Blk	Stl	PF
Trice, D'Mitrik	31	31	1032	33.3	430	13.9	144	351	.410	62	166	.373	80	101	.792	3	102	105	3.4	123	56	1	26	51
Potter, Micah	31	20	689	22.2	389	12.5	141	280	.504	39	101	.386	68	81	.840	56	128	184	5.9	42	42	23	16	63
Davison, Brad	31	31	959	30.9	311	10.0	91	263	.346	63	161	.391	66	76	.868	10	99	109	3.5	73	27	0	33	72
Ford, Aleem	31	31	813	26.2	269	8.7	99	244	.406	46	135	.341	25	32	.781	26	104	130	4.2	34	29	16	19	63
Reuvers, Nate	31	24	649	20.9	257	8.3	100	238	.420	18	63	.286	39	50	.780	30	71	101	3.3	22	31	40	8	67
Davis, Jonathan	31	0	755	24.4	218	7.0	86	195	.441	14	36	.389	32	44	.727	34	94	128	4.1	35	34	18	34	66
Wahl, Tyler	31	18	767	24.7	160	5.2	58	133	.436	10	36	.278	34	60	.567	33	100	133	4.3	42	28	21	31	68
Anderson, Trevor	29	0	411	14.2	91	3.1	33	62	.532	13	24	.542	12	18	.667	8	33	41	1.4	36	13	0	6	23
Carlson, Ben	7	0	64	9.1	20	2.9	6	11	.545	1	3	.333	7	8	.875	1	5	6	0.9	4	1	3	1	10
Crowl, Steven	12	0	36	3.0	8	0.7	4	8	.500	0	1	.000	0	0	-	4	5	9	0.8	2	3	1	0	9
Davis, Jordan	13	0	19	1.5	8	0.6	3	6	.500	2	5	.400	0	0	-	0	1	1	0.1	0	1	0	0	0
Hedstrom, Joe	9	0	16	1.8	4	0.4	1	4	.250	1	1	1.000	1	2	.500	2	1	3	0.3	0	0	0	0	4
Gilmore, Carter	9	0	17	1.9	2	0.2	1	5	.200	0	4	.000	0	0	-	0	3	3	0.3	0	0	0	0	2
Taphorn, Justin	7	0	11	1.6	0	0.0	0	1	.000	0	1	.000	0	0	-	0	0	0	0.0	0	1	0	0	0
McGrory, Walt	1	0	1	1.0	0	0.0	0	0	-	0	0	-	0	0	-	0	0	0	0.0	0	0	0	0	1
Higginbottom, Carter	9	0	11	1.2	0	0	0	4	.000	0	0	-	0	2	.000	0	0	0	0.0	1	2	0	1	1
Total	31	-	6250	-	2167	69.9	767	1805	.425	269	737	.365	364	474	.768	256	785	1041	33.6	414	280	123	175	500
Opponents	31	-	6250	-	2003	64.6	729	1726	.422	194	579	.335	351	491	.715	264	820	1084	35.0	385	356	115	135	501

Legend
GP	Games played	GS	Games started	Avg	Average per game
FG	Field-goals made	FGA	Field-goal attempts	Off	Offensive rebounds
Def	Defensive rebounds	A	Assists	TO	Turnovers
Blk	Blocks	Stl	Steals	High	Team high
