= 2020–21 Rutgers Scarlet Knights men's basketball team =

American college basketball season

2020–21 Rutgers Scarlet Knights men's basketball

NCAA tournament, Second Round
- Conference: Big Ten Conference
- Record: 16–12 (10–10 Big Ten)
- Head coach: Steve Pikiell (5th season)
- Assistant coaches: Karl Hobbs; Brandin Knight; Steve Hayn
- Home arena: Rutgers Athletic Center

2020–21 Big Ten Conference men's basketball standings
	Conf.				Overall
Team	W		L	PCT	W		L	PCT
No. 4 Michigan	14	–	3	.824	23	–	5	.821
No. 2 Illinois †	16	–	4	.800	24	–	7	.774
No. 8 Iowa	14	–	6	.700	22	–	9	.710
No. 20 Purdue	13	–	6	.684	18	–	10	.643
No. 7 Ohio State	12	–	8	.600	21	–	10	.677
Wisconsin	10	–	10	.500	18	–	13	.581
Rutgers	10	–	10	.500	16	–	12	.571
Maryland	9	–	11	.450	17	–	14	.548
Michigan State	9	–	11	.450	15	–	13	.536
Indiana	7	–	12	.368	12	–	15	.444
Penn State	7	–	12	.368	11	–	14	.440
Northwestern	6	–	13	.316	9	–	15	.375
Minnesota	6	–	14	.300	14	–	15	.483
Nebraska	3	–	16	.158	7	–	20	.259
† Conference tournament winner Rankings from AP poll

The 2020–21 Rutgers Scarlet Knights men's basketball team represented Rutgers University–New Brunswick during the 2020–21 NCAA Division I men's basketball season. The Scarlet Knights were led by fifth-year head coach Steve Pikiell and played their home games at the Rutgers Athletic Center in Piscataway, New Jersey as seventh-year members of the Big Ten Conference. They finished the season 16–12, 10–10 in Big Ten play to finish in a tie for sixth place. As the No. 7 seed in the Big Ten tournament, they defeated Indiana in the second round before losing to Illinois in the quarterfinals. They received an at-large bid to the NCAA tournament, their first NCAA Tournament appearance since 1991. As the No.10 seed in the Midwest region, they defeated Clemson in the first round before losing to Houston in the second round.

== Previous season ==
The Knights finished the 2019–20 season 20–11 and 11–9 in Big Ten play to finish in a four-way tie for fifth place. Following the regular season, the Big Ten tournament and all subsequent postseason tournaments were canceled due to the ongoing COVID-19 pandemic, effectively ending the Knights' season. In January 2020, Rutgers was nationally ranked for the first time since 1979.

== Offseason ==
=== Departures ===
Name	Number	Pos.	Height	Weight	Year	Hometown	Reason for departure
Akwasi Yeboah	1	G/F	6'6"	235	RS Senior	Chigwell, England	Graduated, signed with Saint-Quentin of the LNB Pro B.
Joey Downes	10	G	5'11"	175	Senior	East Sandwich, MA	Walk-on, graduated
Shaq Carter	13	F	6'9"	250	Senior	Hollywood, FL	Graduated
Peter Kiss	32	G	6'5"	200	RS Junior	New York, NY	Graduate transferred to Bryant

=== 2020 recruiting class ===
College recruiting information
Name	Hometown	School	Height	Weight	Commit date
Clifford Omoruyi #10 C	Benin City, Nigeria	Roselle Catholic	6 ft 11 in (2.11 m)	240 lb (110 kg)	Mar 29, 2020
Clifford Omoruyi #10 C	Recruit ratings: Scout: Rivals: 247Sports: ESPN:				
Mawot Mag #42 PF	Melbourne, Australia	Prolific Prep	6 ft 7 in (2.01 m)	215 lb (98 kg)	Nov 20, 2019
Mawot Mag #42 PF	Recruit ratings: Scout: Rivals: 247Sports:				
Dean Reiber #78 PF	Greensboro, NC	Northwest Guilford	6 ft 10 in (2.08 m)	230 lb (100 kg)	Aug 31, 2019
Dean Reiber #78 PF	Recruit ratings: Scout: Rivals: 247Sports:				
Oskar Palmquist #75 PF	Kinna, Sweden	Marks Gymnasieskola	6 ft 8 in (2.03 m)	210 lb (95 kg)	Nov 8, 2019
Oskar Palmquist #75 PF	Recruit ratings: Scout: Rivals: 247Sports:				
Jaden Jones; SG / SF	Dallas, TX	St. Louis Christian Academy (MO)	6 ft 7 in (2.01 m)	195 lb (88 kg)	Mar 4, 2020
Jaden Jones; SG / SF	Recruit ratings: No ratings found				
Overall recruit ranking:
Note: In many cases, Scout, Rivals, 247Sports, On3, and ESPN may conflict in their listings of height and weight.; In these cases, the average was taken. ESPN grades are on a 100-point scale.; Sources: "2020 Team Ranking". Rivals.

== Roster ==
2020–21 Rutgers Scarlet Knights men's basketball team
Players
Coaches

Pos.	#	Name	Height	Weight	Year	Previous school	Hometown
G	0	Geo Baker	6 ft 4 in (1.93 m)	195 lb (88 kg)	Sr	Proctor Academy	Derry, NH
F	1	Oskar Palmquist	6 ft 8 in (2.03 m)	220 lb (100 kg)	RS Fr	Marks Gymnasieskola	Kinna, Sweden
F	2	Daniel Lobach (W)	6 ft 7 in (2.01 m)	210 lb (95 kg)	RS Fr	Moravian Prep	Durham, NC
F	3	Mawot Mag	6 ft 7 in (2.01 m)	215 lb (98 kg)	Fr	Prolific Prep	Melbourne, Australia
G	4	Paul Mulcahy	6 ft 6 in (1.98 m)	210 lb (95 kg)	So	Gill St. Bernard's	Bayonne, NJ
C	5	Clifford Omoruyi	6 ft 11 in (2.11 m)	240 lb (109 kg)	Fr	Roselle Catholic	Benin City, Nigeria
G	10	Montez Mathis	6 ft 4 in (1.93 m)	210 lb (95 kg)	Jr	The John Carroll School	Baltimore, MD
F	11	Mamadou Doucoure	6 ft 9 in (2.06 m)	250 lb (113 kg)	RS Jr	Our Savior New American School	Bamako, Mali
C	15	Myles Johnson	6 ft 11 in (2.11 m)	255 lb (116 kg)	RS Jr	Long Beach Poly	Long Beach, CA
F	21	Dean Reiber	6 ft 10 in (2.08 m)	225 lb (102 kg)	Fr	Northwest Guilford	Greensboro, NC
G	22	Caleb McConnell (redshirt)	6 ft 7 in (2.01 m)	195 lb (88 kg)	Jr	SPIRE Academy	Jacksonville, FL
G	23	Nick Brooks (W)	6 ft 1 in (1.85 m)	185 lb (84 kg)	RS Sr	Vermont Academy; West Virginia Wesleyan	Somerset, NJ
G/F	24	Ron Harper Jr.	6 ft 6 in (1.98 m)	245 lb (111 kg)	Jr	Don Bosco Prep	Franklin Lakes, NJ
G	25	Aiden Terry (W)	5 ft 11 in (1.8 m)	150 lb (68 kg)	Fr	Bullitt Central	Mount Washington, KY
G	42	Jacob Young	6 ft 2 in (1.88 m)	185 lb (84 kg)	RS Sr	Yates; Texas	Houston, TX
G/F	45	Jaden Jones	6 ft 8 in (2.03 m)	195 lb (88 kg)	Fr	St. Louis Christian Academy	Dallas, TX
F/C	55	Luke Nathan (W)	6 ft 11 in (2.11 m)	235 lb (107 kg)	RS Jr	Randolph	Randolph, NJ

Head coach

- Steve Pikiell (Connecticut)

Assistant coach(es)

- Karl Hobbs (Connecticut)
- Brandin Knight (Pittsburgh)
- Steve Hayn (Stony Brook)

Legend

- (C) Team captain
- (S) Suspended
- (I) Ineligible
- (W) Walk-on
- Injured
- Current redshirt

Roster

== Schedule and results ==
Date time, TV	Rank^{#}	Opponent^{#}	Result	Record	High points	High rebounds	High assists	Site (attendance) city, state
Non-conference regular season
November 25, 2020*; 7:00 p.m., BTN Plus	No. 24	Sacred Heart	W 86–63	1–0	16 – Harper Jr.	11 – Omoruyi	8 – Young	Rutgers Athletic Center (0); Piscataway, NJ
November 27, 2020*; 7:00 p.m., BTN	No. 24	Fairleigh Dickinson	W 96–75	2–0	30 – Harper Jr.	8 – Mulcahy	7 – Young	Rutgers Athletic Center (0); Piscataway, NJ
November 29, 2020*; 4:00 p.m., BTN	No. 24	Hofstra	W 70–56	3–0	17 – Young	9 – Tied	7 – Mulcahy	Rutgers Athletic Center (0); Piscataway, NJ
December 8, 2020*; 9:30 p.m., ESPN2	No. 21	Syracuse; ACC–Big Ten Challenge	W 79–69	4–0	26 – Harper Jr.	12 – Johnson	10 – Young	Rutgers Athletic Center (0); Piscataway, NJ
Big Ten regular season
December 14, 2020; 6:00 p.m., BTN	No. 19	at Maryland	W 74–60	5–0 (1–0)	27 – Harper Jr.	16 – Johnson	4 – Tied	Xfinity Center (0); College Park, MD
December 20, 2020; 1:00 p.m., ESPN2	No. 19	No. 13 Illinois	W 91–88	6–0 (2–0)	28 – Harper Jr.	9 – Harper Jr.	5 – Baker	Rutgers Athletic Center (0); Piscataway, NJ
December 23, 2020; 4:30 p.m., BTN	No. 11	at No. 23 Ohio State	L 68–80	6–1 (2–1)	20 – Harper Jr.	6 – Harper Jr.	5 – Mulcahy	Value City Arena (0); Columbus, OH
December 29, 2020; 7:00 p.m., FS1	No. 14	Purdue	W 81–76	7–1 (3–1)	25 – Mathis	8 – Johnson	4 – Tied	Rutgers Athletic Center (0); Piscataway, NJ
January 2, 2021; 2:00 p.m., ESPN2	No. 14	No. 10 Iowa	L 75–77	7–2 (3–2)	17 – Young	10 – Johnson	5 – Tied	Rutgers Athletic Center (0); Piscataway, NJ
January 5, 2021; 9:00 p.m., ESPN2	No. 15	at No. 23 Michigan State	L 45–68	7–3 (3–3)	13 – Harper Jr.	7 – Johnson	4 – Mulcahy	Breslin Center (0); East Lansing, MI
January 9, 2021; 12:00 p.m., BTN	No. 15	Ohio State	L 68–79	7–4 (3–4)	19 – Young	8 – Johnson	3 – McConnell	Rutgers Athletic Center (0); Piscataway, NJ
January 15, 2021; 9:00 p.m., FS1		No. 9 Wisconsin	L 54–60	7–5 (3–5)	19 – Young	12 – Johnson	3 – Young	Rutgers Athletic Center (0); Piscataway, NJ
January 21, 2021; 7:00 p.m., BTN		at Penn State	L 67–75	7–6 (3–6)	18 – Harper Jr.	7 – Johnson	5 – Mulcahy	Bryce Jordan Center (209); University Park, PA
January 24, 2021; 12:00 p.m., BTN		at Indiana	W 74–70	8–6 (4–6)	19 – Baker	12 – Harper Jr.	5 – Baker	Simon Skjodt Assembly Hall (0); Bloomington, IN
January 28, 2021; 7:00 p.m., FS1		Michigan State	W 67–37	9–6 (5–6)	13 – Johnson	14 – Johnson	5 – Baker	Rutgers Athletic Center (0); Piscataway, NJ
January 31, 2021; 7:30 p.m., BTN		at Northwestern	W 64–56	10–6 (6–6)	19 – Young	6 – Johnson	5 – Mulcahy	Welsh–Ryan Arena (0); Evanston, IL
February 4, 2021; 9:00 p.m., FS1		Minnesota	W 76–72	11–6 (7–6)	16 – Baker	12 – Johnson	4 – Mulcahy	Rutgers Athletic Center (0); Piscataway, NJ
February 10, 2021; 7:30 p.m., BTN	No. 25	at No. 15 Iowa	L 66–79	11–7 (7–7)	11 – Baker	7 – McConnell	5 – Baker	Carver–Hawkeye Arena (560); Iowa City, IA
February 13, 2021; 5:00 pm, BTN	No. 25	Northwestern	W 64–50	12–7 (8–7)	15 – Young	14 – Johnson	3 – McConnell	Rutgers Athletic Center (0); Piscataway, NJ
February 18, 2021; 9:00 p.m., FS1		at No. 3 Michigan	L 64–71	12–8 (8–8)	16 – Young	7 – McConnell	2 – Tied	Crisler Center (43); Ann Arbor, MI
February 21, 2021; 3:00 p.m., BTN		Maryland	L 59–68	12–9 (8–9)	19 – Young	8 – Tied	3 – McConnell	Rutgers Athletic Center (0); Piscataway, NJ
February 24, 2021; 8:00 p.m., BTN		Indiana	W 74–63	13–9 (9–9)	20 – Tied	10 – Johnson	10 – Baker	Rutgers Athletic Center (64); Piscataway, NJ
March 1, 2021; 7:00 p.m., BTN		at Nebraska	L 51–72	13–10 (9–10)	12 – Young	8 – Omoruyi	2 – Tied	Pinnacle Bank Arena (0); Lincoln, NE
March 6, 2021; 12:00 p.m., FOX		at Minnesota	W 77–70 ^{OT}	14–10 (10–10)	23 – Young	15 – Johnson	7 – Young	Williams Arena (52); Minneapolis, MN
Big Ten tournament
March 11, 2021; 6:30 p.m., BTN	(7)	vs. (10) Indiana; Second Round	W 61–50	15–10	13 – Tied	13 – Johnson	7 – Baker	Lucas Oil Stadium (6,769); Indianapolis, IN
March 12, 2021; 6:30 p.m., BTN	(7)	vs. (2) No. 3 Illinois; Quarterfinals	L 68–90	15–11	21 – Harper Jr.	5 – Johnson	2 – Jones	Lucas Oil Stadium (7,735); Indianapolis, IN
NCAA tournament
March 19, 2021; 9:20 pm, TBS	(10 MW)	vs. (7 MW) Clemson; First Round	W 60–56	16–11	13 – Tied	10 – Tied	4 – Mulcahy	Bankers Life Fieldhouse (3,430); Indianapolis, IN
March 21, 2021; 7:10 pm, TBS	(10 MW)	vs. (2 MW) No. 6 Houston; Second Round	L 60–63	16–12	14 – Baker	5 – Tied	4 – Tied	Lucas Oil Stadium (7,186); Indianapolis, IN
*Non-conference game. ^{#}Rankings from AP Poll. (#) Tournament seedings in parentheses. All times are in Eastern Time.

== Rankings ==
Ranking movements Legend: ██ Increase in ranking ██ Decrease in ranking — = Not ranked RV = Received votes
	Week																		
Poll	Pre	1	2	3	4	5	6	7	8	9	10	11	12	13	14	15	16	17	Final
AP	24	24^	24	21	19	11	14	15	RV	—	—	RV	25	RV	—	—	—	—	Not released
Coaches	23	23^	23^	22	17	12	13	14	RV	RV	—	RV	RV	RV	—	RV	—	—	RV

^AP and Coaches did not release a Week 1 poll, and Coaches did not release a Week 2 poll.
