= 2021 Big Ten men's basketball tournament =

American college basketball postseason

- Classification: Division I
- Season: 2020–21
- Teams: 14
- Site: Lucas Oil Stadium; Indianapolis, Indiana
- Champions: Illinois (3rd title)
- Winning coach: Brad Underwood (1st title)
- MVP: Ayo Dosunmu (Illinois)
- Television: BTN, CBS

2020–21 Big Ten Conference men's basketball standings
	Conf.				Overall
Team	W		L	PCT	W		L	PCT
No. 4 Michigan	14	–	3	.824	23	–	5	.821
No. 2 Illinois †	16	–	4	.800	24	–	7	.774
No. 8 Iowa	14	–	6	.700	22	–	9	.710
No. 20 Purdue	13	–	6	.684	18	–	10	.643
No. 7 Ohio State	12	–	8	.600	21	–	10	.677
Wisconsin	10	–	10	.500	18	–	13	.581
Rutgers	10	–	10	.500	16	–	12	.571
Maryland	9	–	11	.450	17	–	14	.548
Michigan State	9	–	11	.450	15	–	13	.536
Indiana	7	–	12	.368	12	–	15	.444
Penn State	7	–	12	.368	11	–	14	.440
Northwestern	6	–	13	.316	9	–	15	.375
Minnesota	6	–	14	.300	14	–	15	.483
Nebraska	3	–	16	.158	7	–	20	.259
† Conference tournament winner Rankings from AP poll

The 2021 Big Ten men's basketball tournament was a postseason men's basketball tournament for the Big Ten Conference of the 2020–21 NCAA Division I men's basketball season which took place March 10–14, 2021. The tournament was originally to be held at the United Center in Chicago, Illinois. However, on February 9, the tournament was moved to Lucas Oil Stadium in Indianapolis, Indiana to better deal with testing concerns raised by the ongoing COVID-19 pandemic.

Illinois defeated Ohio State 91–88 in overtime in the championship game to win the tournament. As a result, they received the conference's automatic bid to the NCAA tournament.

== Seeds ==
All 14 Big Ten schools participated in the tournament. Teams were seeded by conference record, with a tiebreaker system used to seed teams with identical conference records. The top 10 teams received a first round bye and the top four teams received a double bye. Tiebreaking procedures remained unchanged from the 2020 tournament.

Seed	School	Conference	Tiebreak 1
1	Michigan	14–3	
2	Illinois	16–4	
3	Iowa	14–6	
4	Purdue	13–6	
5	Ohio State	12–8	
6	Wisconsin	10–10	1–0 vs. Rutgers
7	Rutgers	10–10	0–1 vs. Wisconsin
8	Maryland	9–11	1–0 vs. Michigan State
9	Michigan State	9–11	0–1 vs. Maryland
10	Indiana	7–12	1–0 vs. Penn State
11	Penn State	7–12	0–1 vs. Indiana
12	Northwestern	6–13	
13	Minnesota	6–14	
14	Nebraska	3–16	

== Schedule ==
Session	Game	Time*	Matchup^{#}	Television	Attendance	Score
First round – Wednesday, March 10
1	1	6:30 pm	No. 13 Minnesota vs. No. 12 Northwestern	BTN	5,909	51–46
1	2	9:00 pm	No. 14 Nebraska vs. No. 11 Penn State	BTN	5,909	66–72
Second round – Thursday, March 11
2	3	11:30 am	No. 9 Michigan State vs. No. 8 Maryland	BTN	6,206	57–68
2	4	2:00 pm	No. 13 Minnesota vs. No. 5 Ohio State	BTN	6,206	75–79
3	5	6:30 pm	No. 10 Indiana vs. No. 7 Rutgers	BTN	6,769	50–61
3	6	9:00 pm	No. 11 Penn State vs. No. 6 Wisconsin	BTN	6,769	74–75
Quarterfinals – Friday, March 12
4	7	11:30 am	No. 8 Maryland vs. No. 1 Michigan	BTN	7,634	66–79
4	8	2:00 pm	No. 5 Ohio State vs. No. 4 Purdue	BTN	7,634	87–78^{OT}
5	9	6:30 pm	No. 7 Rutgers vs. No. 2 Illinois	BTN	7,735	68–90
5	10	9:00 pm	No. 6 Wisconsin vs. No. 3 Iowa	BTN	7,735	57–62
Semifinals – Saturday, March 13
6	11	1:00 pm	No. 1 Michigan vs. No. 5 Ohio State	CBS	8,000	67–68
6	12	3:50 pm	No. 2 Illinois vs. No. 3 Iowa	CBS	8,000	82–71
Championship – Sunday, March 14
7	13	3:30 pm	No. 5 Ohio State vs. No. 2 Illinois	CBS	8,000	88–91^{OT}

*Game times in Eastern Time. #Rankings denote tournament seeding.

== Bracket ==
First round Wednesday, March 10; BTN
12	Northwestern	46
13	Minnesota	51
11	Penn State	72
14	Nebraska	66

Second round Thursday, March 11; BTN
8	Maryland	68
9	Michigan State	57
5	Ohio State	79
13	Minnesota	75
7	Rutgers	61
10	Indiana	50
6	Wisconsin	75
11	Penn State	74

Quarterfinals; Friday, March 12; BTN
1	Michigan	79
8	Maryland	66
4	Purdue	78
5	Ohio State	87*
2	Illinois	90
7	Rutgers	68
3	Iowa	62
6	Wisconsin	57

Semifinals; Saturday, March 13; CBS
1	Michigan	67
5	Ohio State	68
2	Illinois	82
3	Iowa	71

Championship; Sunday, March 14; CBS
5	Ohio State	88
2	Illinois	91*

* denotes overtime period

== Game summaries ==
=== First round ===
BTN

March 10
6:30 pm

Recap

No. 13 Minnesota 51, No. 12 Northwestern 46
Scoring by half: 27−20, 24−26
Pts: Tre' Williams, 14; Rebs: Eric Curry, 12; Asts: Marcus Carr, 6	Pts: Miller Kopp, 9 Rebs: Pete Nance, 11; Asts: Boo Buie, 3

Lucas Oil Stadium
Indianapolis, IN
Attendance: 5,909
Referees: Larry Scirotto, Bo Boroski, Rob Riley

BTN

March 10
9:00 pm

Recap

No. 14 Nebraska 66, No. 11 Penn State 72
Scoring by half: 37−23, 29−49
Pts: Trey McGowens, 13; Rebs: Derrick Walker, 7 Asts: Derrick Walker, 6	Pts: Jamari Wheeler, 19; Rebs: John Harrar, 14; Asts: John Harrar, 4

Lucas Oil Stadium
Indianapolis, IN
Attendance: 5,909
Referees: Kelly Pfeifer, D.J. Carstensen, Paul Szelc

=== Second round ===
BTN

March 11
11:30 am

Recap

No. 9 Michigan State 57, No. 8 Maryland 68
Scoring by half: 30−34, 27−34
Pts: Malik Hall, 19; Rebs: Aaron Henry, 9 Asts: Rocket Watts, 4	Pts: Eric Ayala, 21; Rebs: Eric Ayala, 9 Asts: Eric Ayala, 4

Lucas Oil Stadium
Indianapolis, IN
Attendance: 6,206
Referees: Steve McJunkins, Rob Riley, Bo Boroski

BTN

March 11
2:00 pm

Recap

No. 13 Minnesota 75, No. 5 Ohio State 79
Scoring by half: 27−39, 48−40
Pts: Marcus Carr, 24; Rebs: Tre' Williams, Brandon Johnson 8 Asts: Marcus Carr, Isaiah Ihnen 4	Pts: Duane Washington Jr., Justice Sueing, 16; Rebs: Justice Sueing, 7 Asts: CJ Walker, 6

Lucas Oil Stadium
Indianapolis, IN
Attendance: 6,206
Referees: Kelly Pfeifer, D.J. Carstensen, Paul Szelc

BTN

March 11
6:30 pm

Recap

No. 10 Indiana 50, No. 7 Rutgers 61
Scoring by half: 32−33, 18−28
Pts: Trayce Jackson-Davis, 19; Rebs: Trayce Jackson-Davis, 9 Asts: Rob Phinisee, 7	Pts: Ron Harper Jr., Jacob Young 13; Rebs: Myles Johnson, 13; Asts: Geo Baker, 7

Lucas Oil Stadium
Indianapolis, IN
Attendance: 6,769
Referees: Lewis Garrison, Courtney Green, Paul Szelc

BTN

March 11
9:00 pm

Recap

No. 11 Penn State 74, No. 6 Wisconsin 75
Scoring by half: 31−41, 43−34
Pts: Sam Sessoms, 18; Rebs: John Harrar, 10; Asts: Myreon Jones, 4	Pts: Aleem Ford, 17; Rebs: Tyler Wahl, 5 Asts: D'Mitrik Trice, 9

Lucas Oil Stadium
Indianapolis, IN
Attendance: 6,769
Referees: Donnie Eppley, Rob Kueneman, Larry Scirotto

=== Quarterfinals ===
BTN

March 12
11:30 am

Recap

No. 8 Maryland 66, No. 1 Michigan 79
Scoring by half: 38−40, 28−39
Pts: Eric Ayala, 19; Rebs: Aaron Wiggins, 7 Asts: Aaron Wiggins, 5	Pts: Mike Smith, 18; Rebs: Austin Davis, 8 Asts: Mike Smith, 15

Lucas Oil Stadium
Indianapolis, IN
Attendance: 7,634
Referees: Edwin Young, Donnie Eppley, Larry Scirotto

BTN

March 12
2:00 pm

Recap

No. 5 Ohio State vs. No. 4 Purdue (OT)
Scoring by half: 49−31, 23−41 Overtime: 15−6
Pts: Duane Washington Jr., 20; Rebs: Justice Sueing, 10; Asts: CJ Walker, 7	Pts: Trevion Williams, 26; Rebs: Trevion Williams, 14; Asts: Trevion Williams, 5

Lucas Oil Stadium
Indianapolis, IN
Attendance: 7,634
Referees: Rob Kueneman, Courtney Green, Bo Boroski

BTN

March 12
6:30 pm

Recap

No. 7 Rutgers 68, No. 2 Illinois 90
Scoring by half: 28−47, 40−43
Pts: Ron Harper Jr., 21; Rebs: Myles Johnson, 5 Asts: Jaden Jones, 2	Pts: Ayo Dosunmu, 23; Rebs: Kofi Cockburn, 12; Asts: Ayo Dosunmu, 6

Lucas Oil Stadium
Indianapolis, IN
Attendance: 7,735
Referees: Steve McJunkins, Kelly Pfeifer, Paul Szelc

BTN

March 12
9:00 pm

Recap

No. 6 Wisconsin 57, No. 3 Iowa 62
Scoring by half: 32−26, 25−36
Pts: D'Mitrik Trice, 19; Rebs: Aleem Ford, Micah Potter, 8 Asts: Jonathan Davis, Brad Davison, 3	Pts: Luka Garza, 24; Rebs: Luka Garza, 9 Asts: Connor McCaffery, 6

Lucas Oil Stadium
Indianapolis, IN
Attendance: 7,735
Referees: Lewis Garrison, Rob Riley, D.J. Carstensen

=== Semifinals ===
CBS

March 13
1:00 pm

Recap

No. 1 Michigan 67, No. 5 Ohio State 68
Scoring by half: 27−26, 40−42
Pts: Hunter Dickinson, 21; Rebs: Hunter Dickinson, Brandon Johns Jr., 8 Asts: Mike Smith, Franz Wagner, 4	Pts: Duane Washington Jr., 24; Rebs: Duane Washington Jr., 6 Asts: Duane Washington Jr., CJ Walker, 4

Lucas Oil Stadium
Indianapolis, IN
Attendance: 8,000
Referees: Donnie Eppley, Courtney Green, Paul Szelc

CBS

March 13
3:30 pm

Recap

No. 2 Illinois 82, No. 3 Iowa 71
Scoring by half: 45−37, 37−34
Pts: Kofi Cockburn, 26; Rebs: Da'Monte Williams, 9 Asts: Ayo Dosunmu, 9	Pts: Luka Garza, 21; Rebs: Luka Garza, 12; Asts: Jordan Bohannon, 6

Lucas Oil Stadium
Indianapolis, IN
Attendance: 8,000
Referees: Lewis Garrison, Rob Riley, Bo Boroski

=== Championship ===
CBS

March 14
3:30 pm

Recap

No. 5 Ohio State 88, No. 2 Illinois 91 (OT)
Scoring by half: 35−40, 42−37 Overtime: 11−14
Pts: Duane Washington Jr., 32; Rebs: Duane Washington Jr., 8 Asts: CJ Walker, 6	Pts: 3 tied, 16; Rebs: Ayo Dosunmu, Kofi Cockburn, 9 Asts: André Curbelo, 5

Lucas Oil Stadium
Indianapolis, IN
Attendance: 8,000
Referees: Kelly Pfeifer, D.J. Carstensen, Larry Scirotto

== All-Tournament Team ==
- Ayo Dosunmu, Illinois – Big Ten tournament Most Outstanding Player
- Kofi Cockburn, Illinois
- Luka Garza, Iowa
- EJ Liddell, Ohio State
- Duane Washington Jr., Ohio State
