= 2020–21 Nebraska Cornhuskers men's basketball team =

American college basketball season

2020–21 Nebraska Cornhuskers men's basketball
- Conference: Big Ten Conference
- Record: 7–20 (3–16 Big Ten)
- Head coach: Fred Hoiberg (2nd season)
- Assistant coaches: Armon Gates; Matt Abdelmassih; Doc Sadler; Bobby Lutz
- Home arena: Pinnacle Bank Arena

2020–21 Big Ten Conference men's basketball standings
	Conf.				Overall
Team	W		L	PCT	W		L	PCT
No. 4 Michigan	14	–	3	.824	23	–	5	.821
No. 2 Illinois †	16	–	4	.800	24	–	7	.774
No. 8 Iowa	14	–	6	.700	22	–	9	.710
No. 20 Purdue	13	–	6	.684	18	–	10	.643
No. 7 Ohio State	12	–	8	.600	21	–	10	.677
Wisconsin	10	–	10	.500	18	–	13	.581
Rutgers	10	–	10	.500	16	–	12	.571
Maryland	9	–	11	.450	17	–	14	.548
Michigan State	9	–	11	.450	15	–	13	.536
Indiana	7	–	12	.368	12	–	15	.444
Penn State	7	–	12	.368	11	–	14	.440
Northwestern	6	–	13	.316	9	–	15	.375
Minnesota	6	–	14	.300	14	–	15	.483
Nebraska	3	–	16	.158	7	–	20	.259
† Conference tournament winner Rankings from AP poll

The 2020–21 Nebraska Cornhuskers men's basketball team represented the University of Nebraska–Lincoln in the 2020–21 NCAA Division I men's basketball season. The Cornhuskers were led by second-year head coach Fred Hoiberg and played their home games at Pinnacle Bank Arena in Lincoln, Nebraska, as members of the Big Ten Conference.

== Previous season ==
They finished the 2019–20 season with a record of 7–25, including 2–18 in Big Ten play, to finish in last place. They lost to Indiana in the first round of the Big Ten tournament which was subsequently canceled due to the coronavirus pandemic.

=== Departures ===
Name	No.	Pos.	Height	Weight	Year	Hometown	Notes
Haanif Cheatham	22	G	6'5"	195	SR	Fort Lauderdale, Florida	Graduated
Matej Kavaš	25	G	6'8"	200	SR	Ljubljana, Slovenia	Graduated
Dachon Burke	11	G	6'4"	180	JR	Orange, New Jersey	Suspended at end of previous season; turned professional.
Jervay Green	11	G	6'4"	180	JR	Denver, Colorado	Transferred to Pacific
Noah Vedral	2	G	6'1"	200	SO	Wahoo, Nebraska	Temporary fill-in from Nebraska's football team. Transferred to Rutgers.
Cam Mack	3	G	6'2"	175	SO	Austin, Texas	Transferred to Prairie View A&M.
Kevin Cross Jr.	1	F	6'8"	240	FR	Little Rock, Arkansas	Transferred to Tulane.
Samari Curtis	15	F	6'3"	175	FR	Xenia, Ohio	Transferred to Evansville.
Charlie Easley	30	G	6'2"	190	FR	Lincoln, Nebraska	Walk-on; transferred to South Dakota State.
Brant Banks	32	F	6'7"	300	FR	Houston, Texas	Temporary fill-in from Nebraska's football team.

=== Incoming transfers ===
Name	No.	Pos.	Height	Weight	Year	Hometown	Previous school
Trey McGowens	2	G	6 ft 4 in	191 lb	Junior	Pendleton, SC	Pittsburgh
Kobe Webster	10	G	6 ft 0 in	172 lb	Senior (Graduate transfer)	Indianapolis, IN	Western Illinois
Trevor Lakes	14	F	6 ft 7 in	215 lb	Senior (Graduate transfer)	Lebanon, IN	Indianapolis
Chris McGraw	30	G	6 ft 0 in	170 lb	Sophomore (walk-on)	Columbus, OH	Otterbein

=== 2020 recruiting class ===
College recruiting
Name	Hometown	School	Height	Weight	Commit date
Teddy Allen; SG	Mesa, AZ	Boys Town (NE); West Virginia; Wichita State; Western Nebraska CC	6 ft 5 in (1.96 m)	215 lb (98 kg)	Dec 12, 2019
Teddy Allen; SG	Recruit ratings: 247Sports:				
Lat Mayen; PF	Adelaide, SA, Australia	Concordia College (SA); TCU; Chipola JC	6 ft 8 in (2.03 m)	195 lb (88 kg)	Dec 31, 2019
Lat Mayen; PF	Recruit ratings: 247Sports:				
Eduardo Andre; C	London, England, UK	Compass Prep (AZ)	6 ft 10 in (2.08 m)	220 lb (100 kg)	May 12, 2020
Eduardo Andre; C	Recruit ratings: 247Sports:				
Elijah Wood; SG	Potomac, MD	Bethesda-Chevy Chase (MD)	6 ft 5 in (1.96 m)	190 lb (86 kg)	Jun 19, 2020
Elijah Wood; SG	Recruit ratings: 247Sports:				
Overall recruit ranking: 247Sports: 63
Note: In many cases, Scout, Rivals, 247Sports, On3, and ESPN may conflict in their listings of height and weight.; In these cases, the average was taken. ESPN grades are on a 100-point scale.; Sources: "2020 Team Ranking". Rivals.

== Roster ==
2020–21 Nebraska Cornhuskers men's basketball team
Players
Coaches

Pos.	#	Name	Height	Weight	Year	Previous school	Hometown
G	0	Teddy Allen	6 ft 6 in (1.98 m)	223 lb (101 kg)	RS Jr	Western Nebraska CC	Mesa, AZ
G	2	Trey McGowens	6 ft 4 in (1.93 m)	191 lb (87 kg)	Jr	Pittsburgh	Pendleton, SC
G	3	Elijah Wood	6 ft 5 in (1.96 m)	174 lb (79 kg)	Fr	Berkmar HS	Potomac, MD
G	4	Shamiel Stevenson	6 ft 6 in (1.98 m)	245 lb (111 kg)	RS Jr	Nevada	Toronto, ON, Canada
G	10	Kobe Webster	6 ft 0 in (1.83 m)	172 lb (78 kg)	RS Sr	Western Illinois	Indianapolis, IN
G	11	Lat Mayen	6 ft 9 in (2.06 m)	205 lb (93 kg)	Jr	Chipola JC	Adelaide, SA, Australia
F	13	Derrick Walker	6 ft 8 in (2.03 m)	232 lb (105 kg)	RS Jr	Tennessee	Kansas City, MO
F	14	Trevor Lakes	6 ft 7 in (2.01 m)	215 lb (98 kg)	Sr	Indianapolis	Lebanon, IN
G	21	Jace Piatkowski (W)	6 ft 3 in (1.91 m)	184 lb (83 kg)	RS Fr	Elkhorn South HS	Elkhorn, NE
F	24	Yvan Ouedraogo	6 ft 9 in (2.06 m)	245 lb (111 kg)	So	INSEP	Bordeaux, France
G	30	Chris McGraw (W)	6 ft 0 in (1.83 m)	170 lb (77 kg)	RS So	Otterbein	Columbus, OH
F	33	Akol Arop (injured) (redshirt)	6 ft 5 in (1.96 m)	203 lb (92 kg)	So	Creighton Prep HS	Omaha, NE
G	34	Þórir Þorbjarnarson	6 ft 6 in (1.98 m)	202 lb (92 kg)	Sr	Menntaskólinn í Reykjavík	Akureyri, Iceland
C	35	Eduardo Andre	6 ft 10 in (2.08 m)	228 lb (103 kg)	Fr	AZ Compass Prep	London, England, UK
F	44	Bret Porter (W)	6 ft 5 in (1.96 m)	228 lb (103 kg)	RS Fr	Millard North HS	Omaha, NE
G	45	Dalano Banton	6 ft 9 in (2.06 m)	204 lb (93 kg)	RS So	Western Kentucky	Toronto, ON, Canada

Head coach

- Fred Hoiberg (Iowa State)

Assistant coach(es)

- Armon Gates (Kent State)
- Matt Abdelmassih (St. John's)
- Doc Sadler (Arkansas)
- Bobby Lutz (Charlotte) (special asst. to HC)

Legend

- (C) Team captain
- (S) Suspended
- (I) Ineligible
- (W) Walk-on
- Injured
- Current redshirt

Roster

== Schedule and results ==
Date time, TV	Rank^{#}	Opponent^{#}	Result	Record	High points	High rebounds	High assists	Site (attendance) city, state
Non-conference season
November 25, 2020*; 11:00 am, BTN		McNeese State	W 102–55	1–0	14 – Tied	7 – Ouedraogo	6 – Banton	Pinnacle Bank Arena (0); Lincoln, NE
November 26, 2020*; 1:00 pm, BTN		Nevada; Golden Window Classic	L 66–69	1–1	18 – Banton	7 – Banton	5 – Banton	Pinnacle Bank Arena (0); Lincoln, NE
November 28, 2020*; 11:00 am, BTN		North Dakota State; Golden Window Classic	W 79–57	2–1	22 – Allen	9 – Banton	8 – Banton	Pinnacle Bank Arena (0); Lincoln, NE
December 1, 2020*; 8:00 pm, BTN		South Dakota	W 76–69	3–1	23 – Allen	12 – Mayen	4 – Tied	Pinnacle Bank Arena (25); Lincoln, NE
~~December 6, 2020~~*; ~~1:00 pm~~, ~~BTN~~		~~Florida A&M~~	Canceled due to COVID-19					~~Pinnacle Bank Arena~~; ~~Lincoln, NE~~
December 9, 2020*; 6:00 pm, ESPN2		Georgia Tech; ACC–Big Ten Challenge	L 64–75	3–2	17 – Banton	9 – Tied	5 – Banton	Pinnacle Bank Arena (25); Lincoln, NE
December 11, 2020*; 6:00 pm, BTN		at No. 8 Creighton; Rivalry	L 74–98	3–3	26 – Allen	9 – Allen	3 – Thorbjarnarson	CHI Health Center Omaha (254); Omaha, NE
December 17, 2020*; 6:00 pm, BTN+		Doane	W 110–64	4–3	16 – Allen	13 – Ouedraogo	10 – Banton	Pinnacle Bank Arena (0); Lincoln, NE
Big Ten season
December 22, 2020; 6:00 pm, FS1		at No. 9 Wisconsin	L 53–67	4–4 (0–1)	15 – Banton	8 – Banton	4 – Banton	Kohl Center (0); Madison, WI
December 25, 2020; 5:00 pm, BTN		No. 19 Michigan	L 69–80	4–5 (0–2)	25 – Allen	6 – Tied	3 – Banton	Pinnacle Bank Arena (0); Lincoln, NE
December 30, 2020; 5:30 pm, BTN		at No. 25 Ohio State	L 54–90	4–6 (0–3)	13 – Allen	8 – Banton	2 – Allen	Value City Arena (0); Columbus, OH
January 2, 2021; 7:00 pm, BTN		No. 17 Michigan State	L 77–84	4–7 (0–4)	23 – Allen	6 – Allen	7 – Banton	Pinnacle Bank Arena (0); Lincoln, NE
January 5, 2021; 6:00 pm, BTN		at Purdue	Game postponed due to COVID-19 issues at Nebraska					Mackey Arena; West Lafayette, IN
January 10, 2021; 5:00 pm, BTN		Indiana	L 76–84	4–8 (0–5)	21 – Allen	6 – Tied	7 – Banton	Pinnacle Bank Arena (0); Lincoln, NE
February 6, 2021; 5:30 pm, BTN		at Michigan State	L 56-66	4–9 (0–6)	13 – McGowens	6 – Banton	3 – McGowens	Breslin Center (0); East Lansing, MI
February 8, 2021; 7:00 pm, BTN		at Minnesota	L 61–79	4–10 (0–7)	15 – Mayen	6 – Tied	6 – Banton	Williams Arena (29); Minneapolis, MN
February 10, 2021; 8:30 pm, BTN		No. 21 Wisconsin	L 48–61	4–11 (0–8)	14 – Mayen	9 – Banton	5 – Banton	Pinnacle Bank Arena (0); Lincoln, NE
February 12, 2021; 8:00 pm, BTN		No. 6 Illinois	L 72–77 ^{OT}	4–12 (0–9)	16 – Mayen	8 – Tied	3 – Walker	Pinnacle Bank Arena (0); Lincoln, NE
February 14, 2021; 2:00 pm, BTN		at Penn State	W 62-61	5–12 (1–9)	14 – Allen	6 – Allen	6 – Banton	Bryce Jordan Center (245); University Park, PA
February 16, 2021; 6:00 pm, BTN		at Maryland	L 50–64	5–13 (1–10)	18 – Allen	5 – Allen	3 – Banton	Xfinity Center (0); College Park, MD
February 17, 2021; 6:00 pm, BTN		at Maryland	L 71–79	5–14 (1–11)	25 – Allen	7 – Banton	4 – Tied	Xfinity Center (0); College Park, MD
February 20, 2021; 4:30 pm, BTN		Purdue	L 58-75	5-15 (1–12)	10 – Stevenson	8 – Ouedraogo	4 – Thorbjarnarson	Pinnacle Bank Arena (0); Lincoln, NE
February 23, 2021; 7:00 pm, BTN		Penn State	L 83–86	5–16 (1–13)	41 – Allen	8 – Allen	6 – Allen	Pinnacle Bank Arena (0); Lincoln, NE
February 25, 2021; 6:00 pm, BTN		at No. 5 Illinois	L 70–86	5–17 (1–14)	18 – McGowens	5 – Walker	2 – Thorbjarnarson	State Farm Center (192); Champaign, IL
February 27, 2021; 6:00 pm, BTN		Minnesota	W 78-74	6–17 (2–14)	14 – Banton	9 – Walker	5 – McGowens	Pinnacle Bank Arena (0); Lincoln, NE
March 1, 2021; 6:00 pm, BTN		Rutgers	W 72–51	7–17 (3–14)	25 – Mayen	7 – Thorbjarnarson	5 – Tied	Pinnacle Bank Arena (0); Lincoln, NE
March 4, 2021; 8:00 pm, BTN		at No. 5 Iowa	L 64–102	7–18 (3–15)	17 – Webster	13 – Mayen	5 – Thorbjarnarson	Carver–Hawkeye Arena (549); Iowa City, IA
March 7, 2021; 12:30 pm, BTN		at Northwestern	L 78–79	7–19 (3–16)	23 – Webster	8 – Thorbjarnarson	6 – Thorbjarnarson	Welsh–Ryan Arena (0); Evanston, IL
Big Ten tournament
March 10, 2021; 8:00 pm, BTN	(14)	vs. (11) Penn State; First round	L 66–72	7–20	13 – McGowens	7 – Walker	6 – Walker	Lucas Oil Stadium (5,909); Indianapolis, IN
*Non-conference game. ^{#}Rankings from AP Poll. (#) Tournament seedings in parentheses. All times are in Central Time.

Schedule source:
