= 2020–21 Michigan State Spartans men's basketball team =

American college basketball season

2020–21 Michigan State Spartans men's basketball

NCAA tournament, First Four
- Conference: Big Ten Conference
- Record: 15–13 (9–11 Big Ten)
- Head coach: Tom Izzo (26th season)
- Associate head coach: Dwayne Stephens (18th season)
- Assistant coaches: Mike Garland (14th season); Dane Fife (10th season)
- Home arena: Breslin Center

2020–21 Big Ten Conference men's basketball standings
	Conf.				Overall
Team	W		L	PCT	W		L	PCT
No. 4 Michigan	14	–	3	.824	23	–	5	.821
No. 2 Illinois †	16	–	4	.800	24	–	7	.774
No. 8 Iowa	14	–	6	.700	22	–	9	.710
No. 20 Purdue	13	–	6	.684	18	–	10	.643
No. 7 Ohio State	12	–	8	.600	21	–	10	.677
Wisconsin	10	–	10	.500	18	–	13	.581
Rutgers	10	–	10	.500	16	–	12	.571
Maryland	9	–	11	.450	17	–	14	.548
Michigan State	9	–	11	.450	15	–	13	.536
Indiana	7	–	12	.368	12	–	15	.444
Penn State	7	–	12	.368	11	–	14	.440
Northwestern	6	–	13	.316	9	–	15	.375
Minnesota	6	–	14	.300	14	–	15	.483
Nebraska	3	–	16	.158	7	–	20	.259
† Conference tournament winner Rankings from AP poll

The 2020–21 Michigan State Spartans men's basketball team represented Michigan State University in the 2020–21 NCAA Division I men's basketball season. The Spartans were led by 26th-year head coach Tom Izzo, and played their home games at Breslin Center in East Lansing, Michigan as members of the Big Ten Conference.

The Spartans finished the regular season 15–13, 9–11 in Big Ten play to finish in a tie for eighth place. The 9–11 finish marked the first time the Spartans had finished with a record under .500 in conference play under Izzo. As the No. 9 seed in the Big Ten tournament, they lost to No. 8-seeded Maryland, marking the first time the Spartans did not play in the quarterfinals of the Big Ten tournament in the tournament's history. The Spartans received an at-large bid to the NCAA tournament as the No. 11 seed in the East region. The selection marked the school's 23rd straight tournament appearance. In their First Four matchup, they were defeated by UCLA.

With Duke failing to make the NCAA tournament, Izzo took over the streak for the longest consecutive appearances in the tournament by a coach, with 23.

== Previous season ==
The Spartans finished the 2019–20 season 22–9, 14–6 in Big Ten play to earn a share of their third straight Big Ten regular season championship. Their season ended following the cancellation of postseason tournaments due to the coronavirus pandemic. MSU was led by Cassius Winston, who averaged 18.6 points and 5.9 assists per game, and Xavier Tillman, who averaged 13.7 points and 10.3 rebounds per game.

== COVID-19 issues ==
On November 9, it was announced that Tom Izzo had tested positive for COVID-19 and would quarantine for 14 days. He returned to the team on November 23.

On January 13, 2021, the school announced that Izzo's son, walk-on Stephen Izzo, had tested positive for the virus. Freshman center Mady Sissoko also tested positive. Both players were required to quarantine and sit out for 17 days. That same day, a third player for Michigan State tested positive, leading to the postponement of the Iowa game on January 14. The next day, the school postponed its January 17 game against Indiana. On January 18, the school announced that three more members of the MSU program, including walk-on Davis Smith, had tested positive the day before, and that the game against Illinois on January 23 would also be postponed.

Shortly before returning to play on January 28, the school announced that Gabe Brown and assistant coach Dane Fife had tested positive and would miss further time due to COVID-19 protocols.

== Offseason ==
=== Departures ===
MSU lost consensus All-American point guard and all-time Big Ten leader in assists, Cassius Winston, to graduation. He scored 1,969 points and dished out 890 assists in his four-year career at MSU. He was picked with the 53rd overall pick in the NBA draft by the Oklahoma City Thunder. He was then traded to the Washington Wizards.

Reserve guard Kyle Ahrens and forward Conner George also graduated from MSU.

Junior forward Xavier Tillman announced on March 24, 2020, that he would explore the NBA draft process, but would not sign with an agent, leaving the possibility he could return to play in the 2020–21 season. On August 2, he announced he would stay in the NBA draft, thereby ending his collegiate career. Tillman was selected with the 35th overall pick in the NBA draft by the Sacramento Kings. He was then traded to the Memphis Grizzlies.

Sophomore guard Aaron Henry announced he would enter the NBA draft, but would also leave open the ability to return to school. On August 2, he announced he was withdrawing from the NBA draft and would return to Michigan State.

Walk-on red-shirt junior center Braden Burke entered his name in the transfer portal on April 10, and announced he was transferring to Central Michigan on April 25.

Name	Number	Pos.	Height	Weight	Year	Hometown	Notes
Kyle Ahrens	0	G/F	6'6"	210	RS SR	Versailles, OH	Graduated
Braden Burke	40	C	7'0"	245	RS JR	Stevensville, MI	Transferred to Central Michigan
Conner George	41	G	6'4"	205	RS SR	Okemos, MI	Graduated
Xavier Tillman	23	F	6'8"	245	JR	Grand Rapids, MI	NBA draft
Cassius Winston	5	G	6'1"	185	SR	Detroit, MI	Graduated/NBA draft

=== Recruiting classes ===
==== 2020 recruiting class ====
On April 2, 2019, days after the Spartans advanced to the Final Four, four-start point guard Jalen Terry announced he would sign to play with the Spartans in 2020. However, on October 15, he announced he would reopen his recruiting, and decommitted from MSU. On September 9, four-star center Mady Sissoko committed to MSU. On October 6, four-star point guard A. J. Hoggard announced he intended to play with MSU in 2020.

College recruiting
Name	Hometown	School	Height	Weight	Commit date
A. J. Hoggard; PG	Coatesville, PA	Huntington Prep	6 ft 2 in (1.88 m)	205 lb (93 kg)	Oct 6, 2019
A. J. Hoggard; PG	Recruit ratings: Scout: Rivals: 247Sports: (83)				
Mady Sissoko; C	Bafoulabé, Mali	Wasatch Academy	6 ft 10 in (2.08 m)	225 lb (102 kg)	Sep 9, 2019
Mady Sissoko; C	Recruit ratings: Scout: Rivals: 247Sports: (87)				
Overall recruit ranking:
Note: In many cases, Scout, Rivals, 247Sports, On3, and ESPN may conflict in their listings of height and weight.; In these cases, the average was taken. ESPN grades are on a 100-point scale.; Sources:

==== Incoming transfers ====
On May 28, 2019, Marquette forward Joey Hauser announced he would transfer to MSU. Due to NCAA transfer rules, he had to sit out the 2019–20 season, but would have at least two years of eligibility left beginning in the 2020–21 season.

=== Early offseason rankings ===
In April 2020, most early pollsters listed Michigan State as a preseason top-15 team for the 2020–21 season. These included ESPN (No. 8), Sports Illustrated (No. 11), Yahoo! Sports (No. 13), USA Today (No. 19), NBC Sports (No. 5), and CBS Sports (No. 12).

== Preseason ==
=== Preseason rankings ===
MSU was ranked No. 13 in the preseason AP Poll. The Spartans were ranked 12th in the preseason Coaches Poll.

=== Preseason Big Ten polls ===
Aaron Henry was the lone Spartan representative on the preseason Big Ten poll chosen by a panel of conference media members.

CBS Sports picked MSU to finish fourth in the conference.

Prior to the start of the season, unofficial awards and a poll were chosen by a panel of 28 writers, two for each team in the conference. Michigan State was picked to finish in fourth.

=== Injuries ===
On November 9, 2020, Tom Izzo announced that freshman AJ Hoggard underwent knee surgery, but was not expected to miss any games.

== Regular season ==
=== Non-conference games ===
==== Eastern Michigan ====
MSU began their 2020–21 season on November 25 at home in front of no fans at the Breslin Center against Eastern Michigan. Foster Loyer got the start for the Spartans and scored a career-high 20 points on six three-pointers. The Eagles kept it close throughout the first half, but the Spartans pulled away for a 16-point advantage at half time. The Eagles never threatened again, as MSU held on for the 83–67 win. Joey Hauser scored 15 points and grabbed nine rebounds. Joshua Langford, in his first gameplay in almost two years, added 10 points on two of seven shooting from three. The win gave the Spartans a 1–0 record to begin the season.

==== Notre Dame ====
Two days after Thanksgiving, MSU welcomed Notre Dame to Breslin. In a similar story to the EMU game, Notre Dame kept the game close before MSU closed the first half on a 17–0 run to take a 13-point halftime lead. MSU kept up the strong defense in the second half, scoring the first nine points in the half to push the lead to 22 points over the Fighting Irish. Aaron Henry led the Spartans with 14 points and added three assists. Joey Hauser notched 16 rebounds and 10 points as MSU pushed the lead to nearly 30 before relaxing and substituting heavily. Rocket Watts also played well, scoring 13 points and handing out a game-high six assists as the Spartans won 80–70. The win pushed MSU to 2–0 on the young season.

==== Duke ====
As part of the re-worked Champions Classic, MSU traveled to Duke to face the Blue Devils on December 1. Once again, MSU trailed early falling behind by 10 points in the first 10 minutes. However, the Spartans again turned up the defensive pressure and the offense came alive, led by Julius Marble who scored a career-high 12 points in 12 minutes of action. The Spartans went to the half leading by four and pushed the lead to as many as 16 in the second half as Aaron Henry scored 14 points and notched five assists while Rocket Watts scored 20. Malik Hall and Joey Hauser each had a double-double as the Spartans won easily 75–69. The win marked MSU's first-ever victory at Cameron Indoor Stadium and was only the third time an Izzo-led squad defeated Duke. The win moved MSU to 3–0 on the season.

==== Detroit Mercy ====
The Spartans returned home to play Detroit Mercy for the first time since 1997 on December 4. Despite being a heavy favorite, the Spartans could never pull away from the Titans and the game was tied at 35 at the half. Rocket Watts took over in the second half, scoring a team-high 23, many of which came late in the game as the Spartans were able to hold off Detroit Mercy for the 83–76 win. Gabe Brown started in the place of Josh Langford who sat out the game due to a sore knee which Tom Izzo said was a mere precaution. Brown scored 16 points while Aaron Henry added 12 points. The win moved MSU to 4–0 on the season.

==== Western Michigan ====
Two days later, Western Michigan came to Breslin for their Second game of the season after spending a week off due to COVID-19 cancellations. The Broncos also gave the Spartans hard time, keeping the game within 10 points until less than 10 minutes remained. Joey Hauser notched a career-high 24 points on six of 10 shooting from three. Gabe Brown again got the start, this time starting in place of Aaron Henry who had arrived late to a film session earlier. The Spartans were finally able to take control of the game in the final 10 minutes, winning by 18, 79–61. The win moved the Spartans to 5–0 on the season.

==== Oakland ====
After traveling to Virginia for a game that was postponed the night before it was scheduled to take place, the Spartans returned home without playing a game. On December 13, the No. 4-ranked Spartans returned to play against Oakland whom the Spartans were 18–0 all-time against. The Spartans started well, taking an early lead, but could not put much distance between themselves and the Golden Grizzlies. MSU led by only four at the half and struggled defensively throughout, eventually allowing Oakland to score 91 points. MSU did pull away early in the second half with a 13–0 run and outscored Oakland by 14 in the half. Led by Gabe Brown's career-high 20 points, Aaron Henry added 15 points while seven Spartans scored in double figures. The 109–91 win moved MSU to 6–0 on the season.

=== Conference games ===
==== Northwestern ====
After a week off for finals, the Spartans opened Big Ten play with a trip to Northwestern. MSU, as it had done the majority of the season, quickly fell behind to the Wildcats. Having last lost to Northwestern in 2012, the Spartans trailed by 13 at the half. MSU's defense struggled mightily, allowing Northwestern to shoot 52.9% from the field and 47.6% from three. Meanwhile, the Spartan offense was even worse. MSU made only eight of 31 three-point attempts and shot under 39% from the field in the game. Northwestern pushed their lead to as many as 21 in the second half and answered every push MSU made, keeping MSU trailing by double digits through most of the second half. Aaron Henry led the Spartans with 11 points while Gabe Brown added 10. However, Rocket Watts and Joey Hauser could only manage five points each. As a result, MSU lost 79–65, marking their first loss on the season and dropping them to 6–1 and 0–1 in conference play. Tom Izzo commented, "That was one of the more inept performances of my 26 years."

==== Wisconsin ====
After dropping to No. 12 in the polls, the Spartans returned home to faced No. 9-ranked Wisconsin. The game stayed close throughout the first half as both offenses played well, scoring 42 points each in the first half. In the second half, the Spartans took a nine-point lead and looked to pull away, but the Badgers quickly rallied. MSU made eight of 11 three-pointers in the game including three for Joey Hauser, but their defense continued to struggle. MSU allowed the Badgers to shoot over 50% from the field as Wisconsin retook the lead and pulled away for a nine-point victory, 85–76. Hauser scored 27 points for MSU while Henry scored 12, but no other Spartan managed more than eight points in the second straight loss. The loss moved the Spartans to 6–2 on the season and 0–2 in conference play.

==== Minnesota ====
The Spartans went on the road to face No. 21-ranked Minnesota on December 28. Minnesota took an early lead and did not look back, blowing out the Spartans 81–56. MSU struggled mightily on offense, managing only 16 points in the first half and shooting 25% from the field in the game. Aaron Henry did not start the game because Tom Izzo chose to start Josh Langford after Rocket Watts asked Izzo to not play point guard. Henry did lead the Spartans in scoring with 11 points while no other Spartans scored in double figures. Joey Hauser, coming off a career-high 27 points against Wisconsin, managed only six points on 1–8 shooting. The loss dropped the Spartans to 6–3 overall and 0–3 in Big ten play for the first time since 2002. The win was the largest margin of victory for Minnesota over MSU ever.

==== Nebraska ====
The Spartans next traveled to Nebraska on January 2. The Spartans offense recovered well with AJ Hoggard making his first career start and Rocket Watts coming off the bench. The Spartans scored 40 points in the first half against the Cornhuskers, but could not put them away, allowing Nebraska to shoot 49% from the field. The Spartans took a lead as big as 18 in the second half, but Nebraska prevented the Spartans from turning the game into a rout. Aaron Henry scored a career-high 27 points for MSU while Joshua Langford added 15 and Gabe Brown scored 10. Joey Hauser struggled, scoring only five points in 20 minutes while Watts scored nine in just 15 minutes. Watts was in the game late as the point guard to protect the lead. The Spartans pulled out a narrow 84–77 win to notch their first Big Ten win on the season. They moved to 7–3 overall with the win.

==== Rutgers ====
The Spartans, having dropped to a No. 23 ranking, returned home to face No. 15 Rutgers. MSU jumped out to an early 11–4 lead and led throughout. Aaron Henry again led the Spartans in scoring with 20 points, but MSU only led by six at the half. However, MSU's defense stifled the Scarlet Knights holding them to 30.5% shooting in the game and 25% from three. Joshua Langford and Rocket Watts added 11 points each as MSU blew out Rutgers 68–45. The Knights shot an abysmal six of 17 from the free throw line while the Spartans made 16 of 19 from the line. Joey Hauser added nine points and 14 rebounds as MSU outrebounded the Knights by 20. The win moved MSU to 8–3 on the season and 2–3 in conference play.

==== Purdue ====
The Spartans next faced Purdue on January 8. MSU started well despite being much smaller than Purdue's frontline players, Tom Izzo played Julius Marble, Maddy Sissoko, and Marcus Bingham significant minutes in the first half. MSU's big men limited Purdue's offensive punch in the half as the Spartans limited the Boilermakers to 26% shooting in the first half while the Spartans shot over 52% from the field. As a result, the Spartans led by 15 at the half. In what looked like would be an easy win, Izzo confusingly did not play Marble, Sissoko, or Bingham in the second half while Purdue's big man Trevion Williams ended with 26 points, 22 of them in the second half. MSU still held on to the lead with less than a minute remaining, but missed free throws by Aaron Henry, AJ Hoggard, and Rocket Watts left the door open for Williams who sank the go-ahead shot with 4.5 seconds left. Henry's rush down the court and ensuing shot rimmed off as MSU lost 55–54. The loss, after leading by as many as 17 was "[o]ne of the more disappointing losses" according to Izzo. The loss dropped MSU to 2–4 in conference and 8–4 overall and resulted in the Spartans falling from the rankings.

==== Rutgers ====
Twenty days later, following a two-week pause and the postponement of three games due to COVID-19 issues within the MSU program, the Spartans finally returned to the Court with a visit to Rutgers. After only being able to practice a few days together, the Spartans fell behind early to Rutgers 15–0. MSU rallied to pull with three at 22–19, but the Knights held a 26–20 lead at the half. MSU fell apart in the second half, managing to score only 17 points while surrendering 41 points by Rutgers as the Spartans were blown out 67–37. No Spartan scored in double figures. Aaron Henry scored seven on three of 10 shooting as the Spartans shot 28.6% from the field and 20% from three. The game marked the first time MSU had lost to Rutgers ever. The loss dropped MSU to 2–5 in conference and 8–5 overall. Gabe Brown did not play in the game as he had recently tested positive for COVID-19. Assistant coach Dane Fife also tested positive and missed the game.

==== Ohio State ====
With their chances at making the NCAA tournament dwindling, MSU traveled to face No. 13 Ohio State on January 31. MSU again struggled defensively, allowing the Buckeyes to shoot over 45% from the field. And, once again, MSU struggled offensively, shooting just 20% from three and 32% from the field. Despite a decent first half performance, they still trailed by 12 at the half. Joshua Langford led the Spartans with 14 points while Joey Hauser added 11. MSU was simply overwhelmed by OSU and lost 79–62 further putting at risk their 22-game NCAA tournament streak. The loss left MSU at 8–6 overall and 2–6 in conference play.

==== Iowa ====
Nearing desperation as the Spartans' chances for the NCAA tournament continued to weaken, MSU traveled to face No. 8-ranked Iowa on February 2. MSU jumped out to an early lead, leading by as many as 12 in the first half and hitting their first six three-pointers. Foster Loyer got the start at point guard for the Spartans and Aaron Henry paced the Spartans, scoring 24 points. Iowa, with National Player of the Year candidate Luka Garza, rebounded to take the lead later in the first half. MSU trailed by five at halftime despite playing their best basketball in some time. The Hawkeyes looked to run away with the game in the second half, leading by 12 on several occasions before MSU tied it at 62. MSU again trailed 78–70 with about two minutes left in the game, but the Spartans scored eight of the next nine points to narrow the lead to two with less than 30 seconds remaining. However, Joshua Langford missed a mid-range shot on the next possession and Iowa iced the game with free throws. The 84–78 loss showed that the Spartans had not given up on the season. Tom Izzo was unhappy with officiating as the Hawkeyes shot 35 free throws to MSU's 15. The loss dropped the Spartans to 8–7 overall and 2–7 in Big Ten play, their worst start in conference since 1970.

==== Nebraska ====
MSU returned home to face Nebraska who was coming off a pause due to COVID-19 on February 6. MSU started well, taking the lead in the first half and building a 12-point lead at the half. The Spartans limited Nebraska to 25% from the field in the first half while MSU shot 44%. Joshua Langford led the Spartans with 18 points while shooting four of six from three. MSU could not put the Cornhuskers away in the second half, never stretching the lead to double figures for more than a few minutes. MSU held on for their first win since January 5, winning 66–56. Aaron Henry added 16 points, but no other Spartan scored in double figures. Gabe Brown returned after missing three games after testing positive for COVID-19. Joey Hauser continued his poor play, fouling out with zero points in 14 minutes of action. The win moved MSU to 9–7 overall and 3–7 in Big Ten play. Thomas Kithier left the game in the first half after not feeling well and was to be tested after the game. Tom Izzo said later that he repeatedly tested negative for COVID-19 in the ensuing days.

==== Penn State ====
Three days later, MSU took on Penn State at Breslin Center. The Spartans played well in the first half, limiting Penn State to 32% shooting including only one of 10 three pointers. MSU made three of six threes in the first half while shooting just under 45% and taking an eight-point lead at the half. Penn State shot a bit better in the second half, making 30% of their threes and 37% from the floor, but MSU struggled, shooting less than 40% from the field and making only one of nine three-pointers. As a result, Penn State narrowed the lead and even took the lead with less than four minutes remaining in the game. However, PSU failed to make a basket from the field in the final 4:29 and Joey Hauser and Marcus Bingham hit free throws down the stretch to give MSU the 60–58 lead with 1:14 remaining, PSU missed three three-pointers on their next three possessions as MSU held on for the 60–58 win. The win moved the Spartans to 10–7 and 4–7 on the season. Aaron Henry led the Spartans with 20 points while Malik Hall added 10 points.

==== Iowa ====
No. 15 Iowa next visited MSU on February 13. MSU trailed from the outset as Iowa shot over 50% from three, but the Spartans were able to limit Luka Garza to only eight points in the game. However, that was not the recipe for success as the Spartans were blown out 88–58 resulting in the school's worst home loss under Tom Izzo. The loss further lessened the Spartans already unlikely chances of qualifying for the NCAA tournament. Gabe Brown led MSU with 15 points while Aaron Henry added 13. MSU shot 35% from the field and 28% from three in the blowout. The loss moved MSU to 10–8, 4–8 on the season.

==== Purdue ====
On February 16, MSU traveled to face Purdue in West Lafayette. MSU kept the game close throughout, even taking the lead at points in the second half. Aaron Henry led the Spartans with 15 points and Maddy Sissoko played well in the first half, scoring five points in six minutes. Julius Marble added 10 points in 19 minutes. Sissoko did not play in the second half as the Spartans went mostly with Thomas Kithier and Marble. As a result, the Boilermakers were able to pull away and won by 11, 76–65. MSU shot the ball pretty well, making 44% of their field goals including 43% from three. Purdue struggled from three, making only three, but dominated inside as Trevion Williams scored 28 points to lead all scorers while Purdue's other big man, Zach Edey added 10 points in just eight minutes of play. The loss moved MSU to 10–9, 4–9 on the season.

==== Indiana ====
On February 20, MSU traveled to Indiana to face the Hoosiers. MSU trailed early, struggling offensively and defensively as Indiana built a double-digit lead. However, the Spartans countered to pull within four at the half. The Spartans only made two threes in the first half despite shooting 41% from the field. In the second half, MSU's offense came alive as Tom Izzo settled on a lineup consisting of Rocket Watts, Josh Langford, Gabe Brown, and Aaron Henry. With Thomas Kithier and Julius Marble alternating at the center position, the Spartans shot over 56% from the field including five of nine from three. MSU also made 15 of 18 free throws after not getting to the free throw line at all in the first half. Aaron Henry tied a career-high with 27 points while Josh Langford and Gabe Brown each scored 14. MSU took the lead with just over eight minutes remaining and pushed the lead to 12 with less than five minutes remaining. The Spartans held on from there despite missing several free throws with less than two minutes remaining. The 78–71 win moved MSU to 11–9 on the season and 5–9 in conference play.

==== Illinois ====
On February 23, No. 5-ranked Illinois visited the Breslin Center. MSU started the game with the lineup that did the most damage in the Indiana game, Rocket Watts at point guard and Josh Langford, Gabe Brown, and Aaron Henry on the wings. Julius Marble got the start to face Illinois big man Kofi Cockburn, playing only seven minutes, scoring six points, and fouling out of the game. Thomas Kithier (six minutes) also fouled out of the game and Maddy Sissoko (eight minutes) was ejected for a hard foul late in the game. Marcus Bingham (11 minutes) committed four fouls as MSU threw all their big men at Cockburn and limited him to 13 points in the game. After trailing 5–0 early in the game, the Spartans took control of the game and dominated Illinois in the first half, limiting them to only 24% from the field and leading 36–26 at the half. Langford grabbed 10 rebounds in the first half, tying his career-high in a game. MSU stretched the lead to as many as 18 in the second half before the Illini narrowed the lead. Langford grabbed 16 total rebounds while Henry led the Spartans with 20 points. Watts, Langford, Brown, and Henry each played over 30 minutes as Tom Izzo settled into the smaller lineup as the team's best chance to win. MSU was forced to play Joey Hauser at center late in the game, but he had his best game in months, scoring 13 including a clutch three-pointer and making several free throws late in the game. Illinois attempted 34 free throws, but only made 19 as MSU pulled out an 81–72 win. The win, by far the biggest of the season for MSU, moved the Spartans to 12–9 and 6–9 in conference play and put MSU back into the discussion for a possible berth in the NCAA tournament.

==== Ohio State ====
Two days later, the Spartans welcomed their second straight top-five opponent as No. 4 Ohio State visited Breslin. Ohio State took the early lead in the first half, shooting 56% from the field while MSU shot just 46%. As a result, Ohio State led by five at the break. Ohio State led by as many as nine in the second half as MSU made only one basket in 14 attempts in a period from the end of the first to the beginning of the second. However, MSU rallied, led by Aaron Henry's 18 points and Gabe Brown's 11 points. For the second straight game, Joey Hauser hit a clutch three-pointer to draw the Spartans within a point. Rocket Watts struggled in the game, shooting one of 10 from the field and playing only 24 minutes. The Spartans went without a point guard down the stretch as Henry ran the point. Up by one, after free throws by Henry, Josh Langford hit a jumper to push the lead to three for the Spartans with 30 seconds remaining. Ohio State moved to within one after free throws by E.J. Liddell. Hauser was fouled with 12 seconds remaining and missed one of two free throws leaving OSU down by two. A good defensive play by Langford gave the ball back to the Spartans, but Langford also missed one of two free throws leaving Ohio State within three with just over a second remaining. MSU held on for the win, 71–67 win, notching a second win against a top-five team in three days. The win moved MSU to 13–9 overall, and 7–9 in conference and put the Spartans squarely back on the bubble and in contention for an at-large berth to the NCAA tournament that seemed completely impossible only a week or two earlier.

==== Maryland ====
On February 28, MSU traveled to face Maryland. The Spartans started slowly, falling behind 11–0. Maryland made six of 10 three-pointers in the first half, but the Spartans narrowed the lead to single digits for most of the half. With MSU trailing by 10 at the half, the Spartans rallied on several different occasions, bringing them within five points on a few occasions. However, Maryland's free throw shooting, making 23 of 24 shots, kept the Spartans from getting any closer. The Terrapins were able to pull away and win by 73–55. MSU, playing its fourth game in eight days, showed fatigue, shooting 33% from the field and 28% from three in the loss. The loss dropped the Spartans to 7–10 in league play and 13–10 overall, but they remained in consideration for an at-large berth to the NCAA tournament.

==== Indiana ====
The Spartans played their fifth game in 10 days as Indiana visited Breslin on March 2. Both teams struggled offensively in the first half, Indiana shot under 28% while the Spartans shot under 37% from the field. As a result, the game was tied at 26 at the half. In the second half, both teams continued to struggle and neither team could manage to take a large lead. MSU made four of 17 three-pointers while limiting Indiana to two three-pointers in the game. Aaron Henry took over late in the game, scoring 12 straight points at one point as MSU pulled away to notch a six-point win, 64–58. Henry finished the game with 22 points, eight rebounds, and five assists. The win moved MSU to 14–10 on the season and 8–10 in conference play. The win also kept the Spartans in the discussion for an at-large berth to the NCAA tournament with only two regular season games remaining. Prior to the game, the Spartans announced that guard Foster Loyer had had shoulder surgery and would miss the remainder of the season.

==== Michigan ====
Two days later, MSU traveled to face rival Michigan on March 4, marking their sixth game in 12 days. MSU kept the game close through most of the first half, but Aaron Henry received his second foul on a controversial "flagrant one" call with 2:43 remaining in the half. Tom Izzo sent him to the bench to avoid his third foul and Michigan closed on a 9–2 run to take 39–28 halftime lead. In the second half, the Wolverines blew out the Spartans, leading by as many as 25. MSU only managed six points in the first 14 minutes of the half and lost 69–50. MSU failed to make a three-pointer for the first time since 2013 and shot only 36% from the field while Michigan shot 50%. The win gave Michigan the regular season Big Ten championship. The loss moved MSU to 14–11 and 8–11 in conference play with one game remaining in the regular season and their NCAA tournament hopes still alive.

==== Michigan ====
Due to rescheduling caused by COVID-19 issues, the Spartans finished the season at home playing their second straight game against Michigan on March 7, their seventh game in 15 days. The Spartans started the game well, shooting 40% from the field and making two of four three-point attempts. Michigan guard Eli Brooks was forced to leave the game five minutes in after twisting his ankle. Rocket Watts played well, scoring 11 of his game-high 21 points in the first half while Joey Hauser also added nine points in the half. In the second half, MSU took control, leading by as many as 11 and limiting Michigan to 33% shooting. Michigan was able to narrow the lead to two points, but Josh Langford hit a big three with 49 seconds remaining and the Spartans made their free throws down the stretch to pull out the 70–64 win. Aaron Henry scored 18 points, including six points in the last 3:43. Watts, who played in front of his mom for the first time in college, led the Spartans in shooting 50% from the field and adding four assists and four rebounds. The win all but assured MSU of an at-large bid to the NCAA tournament and marked the third top-five ranked team MSU had beaten in the last five games. The win moved MSU to 15–11 and 9–11 in league play, marking the first time the Spartans had finished with a sub-.500 record in league play under Tom Izzo.

== Postseason ==
=== Big Ten tournament ===
MSU finished in a tie for eighth place in conference play with Maryland. However, due to tiebreaking rules, MSU received the No. 9 seed in the second round of the Big Ten tournament and will face Maryland on March 11.

==== Maryland ====
MSU played Maryland on March 11 in the second round of the Big Ten tournament. MSU started well, jumping to an early 12-point lead and looking like they would win easily. But, as in their prior meeting, Maryland took over defensively and led by four at the half. They pushed the lead to as many as 19 in the second half before Malik Hall scored many of his career-high 19 points to make the score more respectable as MSU lost 68–57. Aaron Henry scored 12 runs and corralled nine rebounds in the loss. The loss did prevent MSU from playing on Friday in the tournament, the first time MSU had not played in the quarterfinals in tournament history. The loss was not expected to hurt MSU's chances at receiving an at-large bid to the NCAA tournament.

=== NCAA tournament ===
The Spartans received an at-large bid to the NCAA tournament, and were categorized as one of the last four teams in the tournament. As a result, they received an 11 seed in the East region and faced UCLA in the First Four.

==== UCLA ====
MSU started strong and built a 14-point lead late in the first half and led 44–33 at the half. MSU shot over 56% from the field in the first half, but their defense still allowed the Bruins to shoot 50% from the field in the first half. In the second half, MSU shot just 42% from the field and made only one of seven three-pointers as UCLA was able to close the gap and even take the lead in the half. UCLA shot 60% from the field in the second half, but still trailed by three with over a minute remaining. UCLA rebounded a missed free throw on a poor box-out of the shooter by Aaron Henry. Marcus Bingham then fouled the shooter, Jaime Jacquez Jr. who made the basket and the ensuing free throw to tie the game. Holding the ball for the last shot, Henry missed a jumper and UCLA missed a half-court heave to move the game to overtime. In overtime, MSU unraveled, scoring only one basket and losing 86–80. Henry finished the game with 16 points in his last game as a Spartan. Josh Langford, also in his last game as a Spartan, added 12 points.

== Roster ==
Following Xavier Tillman's decision to enter the 2020 NBA draft, Jack Hoiberg was given the team's last remaining scholarship. On September 3, 2020, the school released the official roster showing a new walk-on on the team, Davis Smith, son of former Spartan star Steve Smith.

2020–21 Michigan State Spartans men's basketball team
Players
Coaches

Pos.	#	Name	Height	Weight	Year	Previous school	Hometown
F	30	Marcus Bingham Jr.	6 ft 11 in (2.11 m)	225 lb (102 kg)	Jr	Catholic Central HS	Grand Rapids, MI
F	44	Gabe Brown	6 ft 8 in (2.03 m)	210 lb (95 kg)	Jr	Belleville HS	Ypsilanti, MI
F	25	Malik Hall	6 ft 7 in (2.01 m)	225 lb (102 kg)	So	Sunrise Christian Academy	Aurora, IL
F	20	Joey Hauser	6 ft 9 in (2.06 m)	220 lb (100 kg)	RS Jr	Marquette; Stevens Point HS	Stevens Point, WI
F	0	Aaron Henry (C)	6 ft 6 in (1.98 m)	210 lb (95 kg)	Jr	Ben Davis HS	Indianapolis, IN
G	11	A. J. Hoggard	6 ft 3 in (1.91 m)	220 lb (100 kg)	Fr	Huntington Prep	Coatesville, PA
G	10	Jack Hoiberg	5 ft 11 in (1.8 m)	175 lb (79 kg)	RS Jr	Hinsdale Central	Burr Ridge, IL
G	13	Steven Izzo (W)	5 ft 8 in (1.73 m)	150 lb (68 kg)	So	Lansing Catholic	East Lansing, MI
F	15	Thomas Kithier	6 ft 8 in (2.03 m)	230 lb (104 kg)	Jr	Dakota HS	Clarkston, MI
G	1	Joshua Langford (C)	6 ft 5 in (1.96 m)	200 lb (91 kg)	GS	Madison Academy	Huntsville, AL
G	3	Foster Loyer (injured) (C)	6 ft 0 in (1.83 m)	175 lb (79 kg)	Jr	Clarkston HS	Clarkston, MI
F	34	Julius Marble II	6 ft 8 in (2.03 m)	225 lb (102 kg)	So	Jesuit HS	Dallas, TX
C	22	Mady Sissoko	6 ft 9 in (2.06 m)	235 lb (107 kg)	Fr	Wasatch Academy	Bafoulabé, Mali
G	14	Davis Smith (W)	6 ft 1 in (1.85 m)	185 lb (84 kg)	Fr	Westminster	Atlanta, GA
G	2	Rocket Watts	6 ft 2 in (1.88 m)	185 lb (84 kg)	So	SPIRE Academy	Detroit, MI

Head coach

- Tom Izzo (Northern Michigan)

Assistant coach(es)

- Dwayne Stephens (Michigan State)
- Dane Fife (Indiana)
- Mike Garland (Northern Michigan)

Legend

- (C) Team captain
- (S) Suspended
- (I) Ineligible
- (W) Walk-on
- Injured
- Current redshirt

Roster

=== Depth chart ===
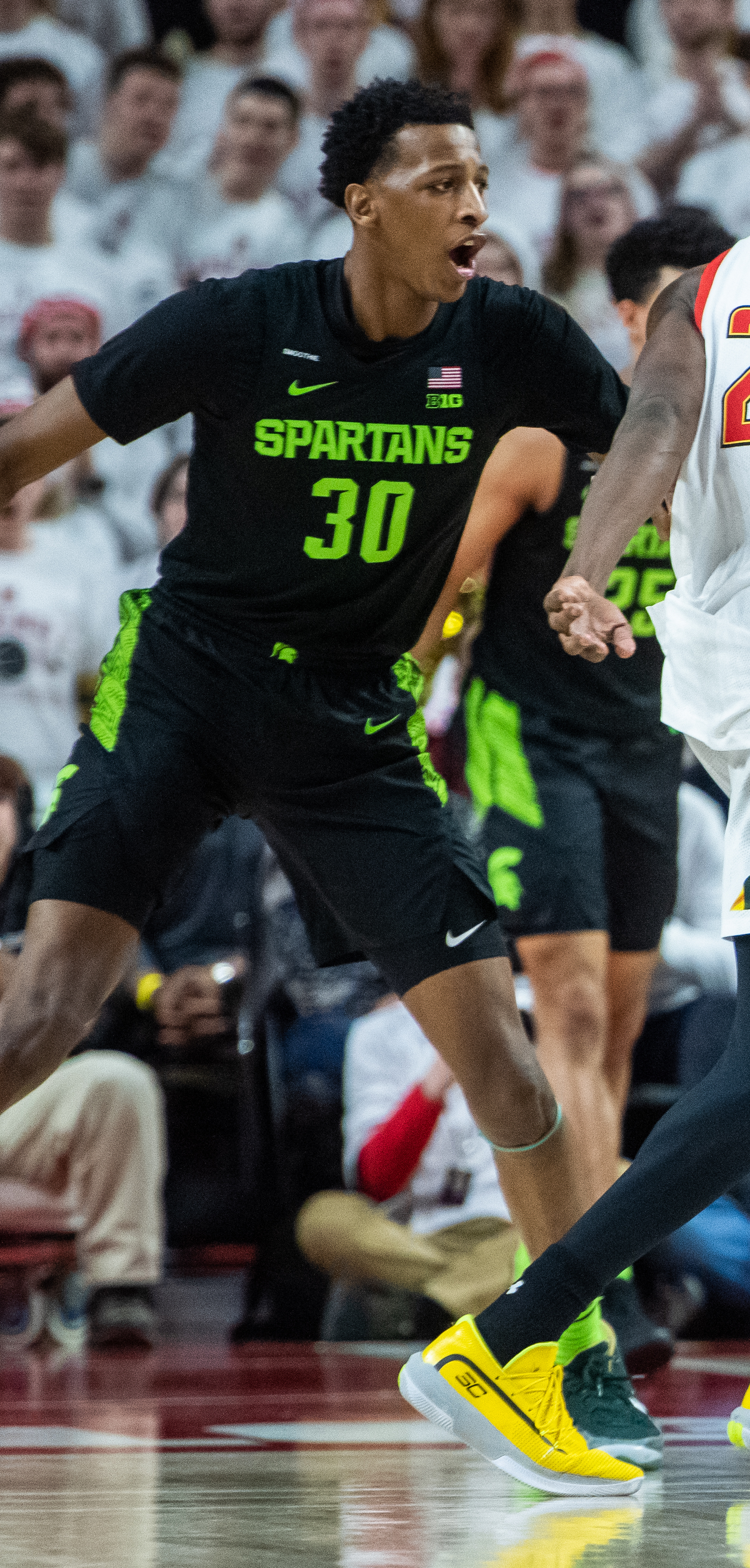
Marcus Bingham Jr. in 2020

Pos.	Starting 5	Bench 1	Bench 2	Bench 3
C	Julius Marble II	Marcus Bingham Jr.	Mady Sissoko	Thomas Kithier
PF	Malik Hall	Joey Hauser
SF	Aaron Henry	Gabe Brown
SG	Joshua Langford
PG	Rocket Watts	A. J. Hoggard

== Schedule and results ==
Due to the ongoing COVID-19 pandemic, the start of the season was pushed back from the scheduled start of November 10. On September 16, 2020, the NCAA announced that November 25 would be the new start date. Matchups for ACC–Big Ten Challenge were released on October 30. The Champions Classic, which was originally to be held on November 10, was later moved to December 1 and was to be held in Orlando. However, due to disagreements between ESPN, who was staging the event (and others), over health and safety protocols related to COVID-19, the event was canceled. It was hoped that the event could be still held elsewhere. Additionally, the Orlando Invitational tournament, also to be held in Orlando by ESPN, was canceled. It was later reported that the Spartans would play their Champions Classic game at Duke while Kentucky and Kansas would play in Indianapolis due to conflicting COVID-19 protocols by the respective schools.

On December 8, one day before they were scheduled to play, Virginia announced it was postponing its ACC–Big Ten Challenge game with the Spartans due to COVID-19 issues at Virginia. On January 12, 2021, it was announced that the game against Iowa on January 13 would be postponed due to at least three positive COVID-19 tests at Michigan State. The next day, the school announced that the game against Indiana on January 17 would also be postponed. On January 18, Tom Izzo announced that the game against Illinois on January 23 would also be postponed due to further positive COVID-19 tests in the MSU program.

On January 25, it was announced that the game against Michigan on February 6 would be postponed due to an outbreak at Michigan of a COVID-19 variant.

The Iowa game was rescheduled for February 2. As a result, and due to COVID-19 issues at Nebraska, the Nebraska game scheduled for February 3 was moved to February 6 to replace the postposed Michigan game. On February 8, it was announced that the Illinois game has been rescheduled for February 23, 2021.

The Indiana game was rescheduled to March 2 and the Michigan game to March 4 meaning MSU would finish the season with seven games in 16 days.

Date time, TV	Rank^{#}	Opponent^{#}	Result	Record	High points	High rebounds	High assists	Site (attendance) city, state
Non-conference regular season
November 25, 2020*; 6:00 pm, BTN	No. 13	Eastern Michigan	W 83–67	1–0	20 – Loyer	9 – Hauser	7 – Henry	Breslin Center (0); East Lansing, MI
November 28, 2020*; 8:00 pm, BTN	No. 13	Notre Dame	W 80–70	2–0	14 – Henry	16 – Hauser	6 – Watts	Breslin Center (0); East Lansing, MI
December 1, 2020*; 7:30 pm, ESPN	No. 8	at No. 6 Duke; Champions Classic	W 75–69	3–0	20 – Watts	10 – Hauser	5 – Henry	Cameron Indoor Stadium (0); Durham, NC
December 4, 2020*; 5:00 pm, BTN	No. 8	Detroit Mercy	W 83–76	4–0	23 – Watts	10 – Henry	4 – Watts	Breslin Center (0); East Lansing, MI
December 6, 2020*; 6:00 pm, BTN	No. 8	Western Michigan	W 79–61	5–0	24 – Hauser	10 – Hauser	6 – Watts	Breslin Center (0); East Lansing, MI
December 9, 2020*; 9:15 pm, ESPN	No. 4	at No. 18 Virginia; ACC–Big Ten Challenge	Canceled due to COVID-19 protocols at Virginia					John Paul Jones Arena; Charlottesville, VA
December 13, 2020*; 12:00 pm, FS1	No. 4	Oakland	W 109–91	6–0	20 – Brown	10 – Hauser	7 – Loyer	Breslin Center (0); East Lansing, MI
Big Ten regular season
December 20, 2020; 7:00 pm, BTN	No. 4	at Northwestern	L 65–79	6–1 (0–1)	11 – Henry	9 – Hall	4 – Watts	Welsh-Ryan Arena (0); Evanston, IL
December 25, 2020; 12:30 pm, FOX	No. 12	No. 9 Wisconsin; Christmas	L 76–85	6–2 (0–2)	27 – Hauser	7 – Hauser	7 – Watts	Breslin Center (0); East Lansing, MI
December 28, 2020; 8:00 pm, BTN	No. 17	at No. 21 Minnesota	L 56–81	6–3 (0–3)	11 – Henry	7 – Kithier	3 – Henry	Williams Arena (0); Minneapolis, MN
January 2, 2021; 8:00 pm, BTN	No. 17	at Nebraska	W 84–77	7–3 (1–3)	27 – Henry	8 – Hall	5 – Hoggard	Pinnacle Bank Arena (0); Lincoln, NE
January 5, 2021; 9:00 pm, ESPN2	No. 23	No. 15 Rutgers	W 68–45	8–3 (2–3)	20 – Henry	14 – Hauser	6 – Hoggard	Breslin Center (0); East Lansing, MI
January 8, 2021; 7:00 pm, FS1	No. 23	Purdue	L 54–55	8–4 (2–4)	13 – Henry	7 – Henry	4 – Hoggard	Breslin Center (0); East Lansing, MI
January 28, 2021; 7:00 pm, FS1		at Rutgers	L 37–67	8–5 (2–5)	7 – Henry	7 – Bingham Jr.	2 – Tied	Rutgers Athletic Center (0); Piscataway, NJ
January 31, 2021; 1:00 pm, CBS		at No. 13 Ohio State	L 62–79	8–6 (2–6)	14 – Langford	7 – Henry	3 – Henry	Value City Arena (0); Columbus, OH
February 2, 2021; 7:00 pm, FS1		at No. 8 Iowa rescheduled from January 14	L 78–84	8–7 (2–7)	24 – Henry	9 – Tied	5 – Henry	Carver-Hawkeye Arena (557); Iowa City, IA
February 6, 2021; 6:30 pm, BTN		Nebraska rescheduled from February 3	W 66–56	9–7 (3–7)	18 – Langford	7 – Brown	5 – Henry	Breslin Center (0); East Lansing, MI
February 9, 2021; 7:00 pm, ESPN2		Penn State	W 60–58	10–7 (4–7)	20 – Henry	9 – Bingham Jr.	3 – Henry	Breslin Center (0); East Lansing, MI
February 13, 2021; 2:30 pm, FOX		No. 15 Iowa	L 58–88	10–8 (4–8)	15 – Brown	7 – Hauser	5 – Tied	Breslin Center (0); East Lansing, MI
February 16, 2021; 7:00 pm, ESPN		at Purdue	L 65–76	10–9 (4–9)	15 – Henry	6 – Hall	4 – Henry	Mackey Arena (250); West Lafayette, IN
February 20, 2021; 12:00 pm, ESPN		at Indiana	W 78–71	11–9 (5–9)	27 – Henry	6 – Langford	5 – Langford	Simon Skjodt Assembly Hall (0); Bloomington, IN
February 23, 2021; 7:00 pm, FS1		No. 5 Illinois rescheduled from January 23	W 81–72	12–9 (6–9)	20 – Henry	16 – Langford	5 – Henry	Breslin Center (0); East Lansing, MI
February 25, 2021; 9:00 pm, ESPN		No. 4 Ohio State	W 71–67	13–9 (7–9)	18 – Henry	5 – Tied	6 – Hoggard	Breslin Center (0); East Lansing, MI
February 28, 2021; 2:00 pm, CBS		at Maryland	L 55–73	13–10 (7–10)	12 – Langford	8 – Hauser	4 – Tied	Xfinity Center (0); College Park, MD
March 2, 2021; 8:00 pm, BTN		Indiana rescheduled from January 17	W 64–58	14–10 (8–10)	22 – Henry	8 – Henry	5 – Henry	Breslin Center (0); East Lansing, MI
March 4, 2021; 7:00 pm, ESPN		at No. 2 Michigan; Rivalry/rescheduled from February 6	L 50–69	14–11 (8–11)	14 – Henry	5 – Henry	2 – Tied	Crisler Center (133); Ann Arbor, MI
March 7, 2021; 4:30 pm, CBS		No. 2 Michigan; Rivalry	W 70–64	15–11 (9–11)	21 – Watts	8 – Bingham Jr.	4 – Watts	Breslin Center (0); East Lansing, MI
Big Ten tournament
March 11, 2021; 11:30 am, BTN	(9)	vs. (8) Maryland; Second Round	L 57–68	15–12	19 – Hall	9 – Henry	4 – Watts	Lucas Oil Stadium (6,206); Indianapolis, IN
NCAA tournament
March 18, 2021; 10:19 pm, TBS	(11 E)	vs. (11 E) UCLA; First Four	L 80–86 ^{OT}	15–13	18 – Henry	7 – Langford	7 – Henry	Mackey Arena; West Lafayette, IN
*Non-conference game. ^{#}Rankings from AP Poll. (#) Tournament seedings in parentheses. All times are in Eastern Time.

== Player statistics ==
Individual player statistics (final)
			Minutes		Scoring		Total FGs			3-point FGs			Free-throws			Rebounds							
Player	GP	GS	Tot	Avg	Pts	Avg	FG	FGA	Pct	3FG	3FA	Pct	FT	FTA	Pct	Off	Def	Tot	Avg	A	Stl	Blk	TO
Bingham, Marcus	28	5	321	11.5	99	3.5	34	68	.500	0	3	.000	31	42	.738	21	69	90	3.2	9	16	39	11
Brown, Gabe	25	5	517	20.7	179	7.2	65	138	.471	34	81	.420	15	17	.882	20	48	68	2.7	13	10	13	16
Hall, Malik	28	9	491	17.5	139	5.0	45	92	.489	8	22	.364	41	59	.695	39	78	117	4.2	35	10	5	25
Hauser, Joey	28	16	601	21.5	271	9.7	94	198	.475	34	100	.340	49	68	.721	38	119	157	5.6	40	12	6	52
Henry, Aaron	28	26	910	32.5	430	15.4	163	363	.449	24	81	.296	80	105	.762	39	119	158	5.6	101	37	36	80
Hoggard, AJ	26	8	344	13.2	64	2.5	23	75	.307	3	18	.167	15	25	.600	4	45	49	1.9	51	9	5	28
Hoiberg, Jack	14	0	44	3.1	7	0.5	2	13	.154	0	6	.000	3	7	.429	1	2	3	0.2	5	0	0	2
Izzo, Steven	8	0	11	1.4	0	0.0	0	3	.000	0	2	.000	0	0		1	0	1	0.1	1	0	0	3
Kithier, Thomas	26	14	281	10.8	62	2.4	26	40	.650	0	0		10	13	.769	33	31	64	2.5	18	4	4	12
Langford, Joshua	27	26	757	28.0	262	9.7	93	247	.377	35	102	.343	41	55	.750	30	66	96	3.6	48	16	9	39
Loyer, Foster	19	7	316	16.6	79	4.2	20	68	.294	17	52	.327	22	25	.880	4	26	30	1.6	44	4	1	12
Marble, Julius	27	9	252	9.3	109	4.0	41	71	.577	1	1	1.000	26	38	.684	19	38	57	2.1	2	3	4	19
Sissoko, Mady	25	0	136	5.4	27	1.1	10	17	.588	0	0		7	16	.438	13	32	45	1.8	0		0	9
Smith, Davis	7	0	10	1.4	0	0.0	0	1	.000	0	0		0	1	.000	0	0	0	0.0	1	0	1	0
Watts, Rocket	28	15	634	22.6	216	7.7	81	241	.336	22	87	.253	32	41	.780	9	38	47	1.7	76	4	0	44
Team																							
Total	28		5625		1944	69.4	697	1635	.426	178	555	.321	372	512	.727	304	744	1048	37.4	444	125	132	364
Opponents	28		5625		1991	71.1	693	1625	.426	176	548	.321	429	599	.16	265	694	959	34.3	371	181	86	295

Legend
GP	Games played	GS	Games started	Avg	Average per game
FG	Field-goals made	FGA	Field-goal attempts	Off	Offensive rebounds
Def	Defensive rebounds	A	Assists	TO	Turnovers
Blk	Blocks	Stl	Steals

== Rankings ==
Ranking movements Legend: ██ Increase in ranking ██ Decrease in ranking — = Not ranked RV = Received votes т = Tied with team above or below
	Week																		
Poll	Pre	1	2	3	4	5	6	7	8	9	10	11	12	13	14	15	16	17	Final
AP	13	8	4	4	12	17	23т	RV	—	RV	—	—	—	—	—	—	RV	—	Not released
Coaches	12	12*	4	4	11	18	RV	RV	RV	RV	RV	—	—	—	—	RV	RV	—	—

*Coaches did not release a week 1 poll.

== Awards and honors ==
=== Post-season awards ===
==== Aaron Henry ====
- All-Big Ten Defensive Team
- All-Big Ten Third Team
