= Foster Loyer =

American basketball player (born 1999)

Brooklyn Nets
- Position: Head video coordinator

Personal information
- Born: June 24, 1999 (age 27) Cincinnati, Ohio, U.S.
- Listed height: 6 ft 0 in (1.83 m)
- Listed weight: 175 lb (79 kg)

Career information
- High school: Clarkston (Clarkston, Michigan)
- College: Michigan State (2018–2021); Davidson (2021–2023)

Career highlights
- 2× Second-team All-Atlantic 10 (2022, 2023); Mr. Basketball of Michigan (2018)

Foster Jacob Loyer (born June 24, 1999) is a former American basketball player who is on the coaching staff of the Brooklyn Nets. He played college basketball for the Michigan State Spartans and the Davidson Wildcats. At the latter, he was a two-time second-team All-Atlantic 10 Conference (A-10) honoree and an All-A-10 Tournament team selection as a player. His teams have won two Big Ten Conference regular season championships, a Big Ten Tournament Championship, a Final Four entry and an A-10 Conference regular season championship. He attended Clarkston High School where he was a 2-time Michigan High School Athletic Association (MHSAA) state champion, won the 2018 Mr. Basketball of Michigan and was a 4-time 1st team All-State honoree. He served as captain at both Michigan State and Davidson.

Loyer has several notable free throw shooting accomplishments, including MHSAA records for both career free throws made (634) and consecutive free throws made (119), 2021–22 NCAA Division I free throw percentage leader (93.65%), and 2021–22 and 2022–23 (92.09%) A-10 free throw percentage leader (fourth in 2022–23 NCAA Division I). He is the Davidson Wildcats single-season free throw percentage, career free throw percentage and consecutive free throws made record holder. His high school consecutive free throw streak was second all-time for American high school players when it ended on January 24, 2017.

He also holds the MHSAA record for points scored in a state championship game quarter (19) and was the Atlantic 10 2021–22 three point shooting percentage leader (43.8%, fourth in the Division I).

Loyer is the son of NBA coach and scout John Loyer and brother of 2022 Indiana Mr. Basketball runner-up and former Purdue player Fletcher Loyer.

== Early life ==
Loyer was born to John and Katie Loyer on June 24, 1999, in Cincinnati, Ohio. His father played basketball at the University of Akron and his mom played volleyball at Indiana University, and was an assistant coach for Purdue volleyball. His grandfather, Al McFarland, played for Purdue Boilermakers men's basketball in 1964. Foster has two younger siblings, Fletcher and Jersey, a 2024 freshman Division I volleyball player at Butler University.

The Loyer family moved for John's National Basketball Association career with the Portland Trail Blazers, Philadelphia 76ers, New Jersey Nets and Detroit Pistons. Loyer was an assistant coach for the Portland (2003–05), Philadelphia (2005–09) and New Jersey (2009–11) before taking on the same role with Detroit in 2011. He served as Pistons interim head coach for 32 games for the 2013-14 Pistons. He later joined the Los Angeles Clippers as a scout in 2016. Foster grew up in and around NBA arenas shooting as a toddler at lowered rims after games in Portland and shadow boxing before games with Allen Iverson in Philadelphia. He eventually became an NBA ball boy at his father's teams. Among the other relationships that gave him professional athlete exposure were those with Zach Randolph, Thaddeus Young and Kyle Korver. In seventh grade, the family moved to Clarkston, Michigan.

== High school career ==
Loyer had a very accomplished high school career, which placed his name in the MHSAA record book over 2 dozen times as of March 15, 2023. He is listed at the top of the record book in three places: career free throws made (634), consecutive free throws (119) and championship game single-quarter points scored (19). He also surpassed Dane Fife, his coaches son, (2,287) for the Clarkston high school career scoring record on the same day that he scored 19 points in the second quarter of the 2018 MHSAA boys basketball Class A championship game to end his high school career with 2,325 points. He started every game from the beginning of his freshman season.

=== Early years (2014–16) ===
Loyer was offered a scholarship at Michigan State before he started high school. Izzo claims he offered Loyer a scholarship during his freshman season. Loyer was a Class A first-team all-state selection as a freshman by The Detroit News, which stated his averages were 16 points, 5.5 assists, 3 steals. MLive.com claims his freshman averages were 17.3 points, 5.3 rebounds and 4.5 assists per game. As a sophomore, he repeated as a Class A first-team all-state selection by The Detroit News. His sophomore averages were 22.6 points, 6.7 assists, 4.3 rebounds and 2.7 steals per game.

=== Junior season (2016–17) ===
On November 22, 2016, four-star point guard Foster Loyer committed to Michigan State. Loyer's 119 consecutive free throws made streak that began on March 3, 2016, came to an end on January 24, 2017. It surpassed Frankenmuth's Brad Redford's streak of 102 that ended on December 9, 2008, as the MHSAA record. According to the National Federation of State High School Associations, the streak was the second-best all-time behind Daryl Moreau, who made 126 for De La Salle (New Orleans) from January 17, 1978, through January 9, 1979.

On March 24, 2017, Loyer tallied 32 points in the MHSAA Class A semifinal 78–35 blowout against West Bloomfield at the Breslin Center. Loyer shot 10–17 shooting, including 5–8 on three-point shots, and 7–7 on his free throw attempts. He also had 7 assists and 3 steals. The next day, he posted 29 points, five rebounds and three assists to lead Clarkston to the MHSAA Class A championship with a 75–69 victory against a Grand Rapids Christian High School team that included Xavier Tillman Sr. and Duane Washington Jr. Tillman was a former Amateur Athletic Union (AAU) teammate of Loyer's and was 2017 Mr. Basketball of Michigan runner-up. The win gave Clarkston 35th-year head coach Dan Fife his 677th victory, but his first state championship. Following the season, he was an all-class dream team selection by The Detroit News with 25.1 points and 6.4 assists averages. Mlive also credited him with 4.2 rebounds and 2.7 steals per game.

=== Senior season (2017–18) ===
According to Scout.com ratings at the beginning of his senior season, the Spartans had the third best recruiting class in 2018 with Marcus Bingham Jr., Gabe Brown, Aaron Henry, Loyer and Thomas Kithier. On February 27, 2018, Loyer had what seemed to be a season ending torn meniscus, but he sat out one game and was back on the court on March 7 playing through the injury, since it was only a partial tear. On March 19, 2018, Loyer, who had a 3.96 grade point average, won Mr. Basketball of Michigan with 3,691 points and more than twice as many first-place votes than Michigan Wolverines men's basketball commits East Lansing's Brandon Johns (2,792 points) and Detroit East English's Village's David DeJulius (2,542) who finished 2nd and 3rd, respectively.

On March 23, 2018, Loyer posted 42 points on 12–17 shooting in a MHSAA Class A 74-49 semifinal victory over De La Salle Collegiate High School. The next day, he posted 40 points on 14–19 shooting in an 81–38 victory over West Ottawa High School for the Class A championship. Over the course of the weekend he shot 13–22 on three point shots. His record-setting high school career total of 634 free throws made surpassed a ten-year-old record of 629 set by Tekonsha's Dustin Orns. Following the season, he was an all-class dream team selection by The Detroit News with 26.6 points and 6 assists averages. He was also named the 2018 Michigan boys' basketball Gatorade Player of the Year.

247Sports' composite rating for Loyer was as a 4-star point guard ranked 96th (16th point guard and 3rd Michigan) in the national class of 2018. His other offers were from Purdue, DePaul, Davidson and Oakland.

College recruiting
Name	Hometown	School	Height	Weight	Commit date
Foster Loyer; PG	Clarkston, MI	Clarkston High School	6 ft 0 in (1.83 m)	157 lb (71 kg)	Nov 22, 2016
Foster Loyer; PG	Recruit ratings: Scout: Rivals: 247Sports: (85)				
Overall recruit ranking: 247Sports: 96th (16th PG and 3rd MI)
Note: In many cases, Scout, Rivals, 247Sports, On3, and ESPN may conflict in their listings of height and weight.; In these cases, the average was taken. ESPN grades are on a 100-point scale.; Sources:

== College ==
=== Michigan State ===
While at Michigan State, he played on teams that achieved two Big Ten regular season championship, a Big Ten Tournament championship, and a Final Four appearance.

==== Freshman season (2018–19) ====
Loyer was a freshman on the 2018–19 Michigan State Spartans men's basketball team, that was a 2018–19 Big Ten Conference men's basketball regular season co-champion and 2019 Big Ten men's basketball tournament champion. The team had to defeat rival Michigan in the final game of the regular season to earn a share of the regular season co-championship. In the opening game of the Big Ten Tournament against Ohio State, Loyer scored 14 points off the bench, including three three-pointers to give MSU the lead. The win marked the 600th career victory for Tom Izzo, all at Michigan State. They defeated Michigan for the third time in the season to win the championship game of the Big Ten tournament. The team lost to Texas Tech in the Final Four of the 2019 NCAA Division I men's basketball tournament on April 6, 2019.

==== Sophomore season (2019–20) ====
On December 29, 2019, Michigan State defeated Western Michigan 95–62. Loyer started in place of an injured Cassius Winston and posted a career-high and team-high 16 points, making all four of his three-point shots. His performance set career highs for points, assists (6) and minutes played. On January 29, Loyer contributed 12 points on 4 three point shots to defeat Northwestern. The 2019–20 Michigan State Spartans men's basketball team repeated as 2019–20 Big Ten Conference men's basketball regular season co-champions.

==== Junior season (2020–21) ====
Dane Fife was one of his assistant coaches for the 2020–21 Michigan State Spartans men's basketball team. Loyer was named co-captain of the team along with Joshua Langford and Aaron Henry.

On November 25, Loyer scored a career-high 20 points on six three-pointers in a starting role in an 83–67 win over Eastern Michigan at the Breslin Center with no fans attending. On March 2, the Spartans announced that Loyer had had shoulder surgery and would miss the remainder of the season.

After backing up Winston for 2 seasons, Loyer was only able to earn 16.6 minutes per game of playing time as a junior. Michigan State had signed point guard recruit Jaden Akins on August 13, 2020. Then, on March 27, 2021, point guard Tyson Walker announced that he would transfer to Michigan State. Loyer consulted with Izzo extensively regarding his future with the team and his options. On April 19, 2021, Loyer entered the NCAA transfer portal. He was the fourth Spartan to enter the portal. Loyer's junior season was a disappointment. After opening the season as the starter, he only started 7 games as he had difficulty consistently creating shots off the dribble and defending his position. His shooting efficiency was mediocre (29% field goal percentage — 33% on three point shots). On May 13, with a three-guard Michigan State class of 2021 recruiting class on the horizon, Loyer decided to transfer to Davidson, where he would be eligible to play immediately.

=== Davidson ===
==== Senior season (2021–22) ====
Prior to the season, he was elected co-captain along with Luka Brajkovic and Michael Jones of the 2021–22 Davidson Wildcats. Loyer debuted with a 27-point performance on November 9, 2021 against Delaware. On December 12, Loyer posted a career-high 35 points including 8 three point shots (on 12 attempts) against Northeastern. On January 10, 2022, Loyer was named Atlantic 10 Player of the Week as his 22-point, 4-rebound, 5-assist averages for the week and 50–40–90 shooting helped Davidson win its 10th and 11th consecutive games. At the time he was second in the nation with a 51.2% three point shooting percentage. On February 1 against St. Bonaventure, he extended his consecutive free throws made streak to 45, surpassing Steph Curry's school record of 41. Under head coach Bob McKillop, the Wildcats went 27–7 and was 2021–22 Atlantic 10 Conference men's basketball regular season. As a senior for the team, Loyer was a 2021–22 Atlantic 10 Conference All-Conference Second Team selection alongside Davidson's First team honorees Brajkovic and Hyunjung Lee. The team was 2022 Atlantic 10 men's basketball tournament runner-up to Richmond and Loyer was selected to the All-tournament team.

In the first round of the 2022 NCAA Division I men's basketball tournament, 10th-seeded Davidson was matched up against Loyer's former Spartan team. Prior to the game, MSU coach Izzo spoke highly of Loyer, noting support for Loyer's transfer decision process and his feeling that Loyer had a future on the sidelines. He also felt that Michigan State fans had been unduly harsh to Loyer during his time at MSU. Regarding, Loyer's free throw shooting Izzo said "If anybody fouls him, I’ll probably take the kid out of the game because I know [Loyer’s] not missing a free throw." Loyer also remained close with his 2018 Michigan State recruiting classmates Gabe Brown and Marcus Bingham Jr. Davidson lost 74–73, with Loyer hitting a three-point shot to reduce the deficit to 2 points with 4.6 seconds remaining and posting 12 points, 6 rebounds and 4 assists and going 5–5 from the free throw line. Loyer led the 2022–23 Davidson Wildcats in scoring (16.2), led the nation in free throw percentage (93.6%) and was fourth in the nation in three point shooting percentage (43.8%). Loyer's 118–126 (93.65%) shooting set a Davidson single-season record (minimum 60 made), surpassing Nik Cochran's 116–124 (93.55%) for the 2012–13 Davidson Wildcats and his streak of 46 in a row surpassed Curry' streak of 41 for the 2007–08 Davidson Wildcats according to Davidson Wildcat basketball's 2022–23 Fact Book.

==== Redshirt season (2022–23) ====
With Lee and Brajkovic departed and Matt McKillop taking over the head coaching job from his father, Loyer was the leader of the team for the 2022–23 Davidson Wildcats. He was elected captain again along with Sam Mennenga and Grant Huffman. Entering the 2022–23 NCAA Division I men's basketball season, Loyer was a 2022–23 Atlantic 10 Conference men's basketball season preseason first team All-conference selection.

He began the season by posting 30 points, including 6–8 three points shooting in the November 7 season opener against Guilford. In his next outing on November 9, he posted a career-high 38 points against Wright State. The effort was the first back-to-back 30-point performances by a wildcat since Kellan Grady did so for the 2017–18 Wildcats. He opened the second overtime with a pair of three point shots to help Davidson take control. He was named Atlantic 10 player of the week on November 14, 2022, after averaging 28.3 points, 6.3 rebounds, 5.7 assists and 1.7 steals per game for the first three games (all victories). This included the 38-point/11-rebound/9-assist double-overtime effort against Wright State in which Davidson trailed by as many as 21 points (16 at halftime). Loyer scored 16 points in the second half and went 4–4 (3–3 on three point shots) in overtime. When Davidson faced his brother's number 1 ranked Purdue team on December 17, they lost 69–61, and Foster was outscored by his brother 14–11. He finished the season as an Atlantic 10 Conference All-Conference Second Team selection again. His 128–139 (92.09%) free throw shooting performance again led the A-10 and was fourth in the NCAA Division I.

The Davidson Wildcats 2023–24 Fact Book lists Loyer at 92.8% as the career free throw shooting percentage (minimum 200 made) above Cochran and Curry. According to the Atlantic 10 Conference 2019–20 Media Guide records, the A-10 career free throw percentage leader is Rick Suder of Duquesne Dukes men's basketball (342–390 87.69%, 1983–86, min 2.5 FT/game). No more recent A-10 record book seems to be online. For Loyer's A-10 seasons with Davidson, his 244–263 (92.78%) in 60 games achieves the threshold to qualify for the record. However, for his NCAA career (including his Michigan State seasons), his 298–323 (92.26%) in 146 games does not meet the 2.5 FT/game criterion. The 2019–20 A-10 Media Guide does not list consecutive free throws made. The 2023–24 NCAA Record book listed 300 free throws made and 2.5 FT made per game as the criterion for career free throw percentage record, leaving Loyer disqualified by both criteria, while Cochran is listed 17th in the all-time NCAA Division I top career percentages list with 358–401=89.3%. That record book shows the NCAA consecutive free throws made records as being 73 within a single season and 85 for a career.

== Brooklyn Nets ==
In September 2023, Loyer joined the staff of the Brooklyn Nets as an assistant video coordinator. In August 2025, he was named head video coordinator, who sits courtside on the bench during games.

== Career statistics ==
Legend
GP	Games played	GS	Games started	MPG	Minutes per game
FG%	Field goal percentage	3P%	3-point field goal percentage	FT%	Free throw percentage
RPG	Rebounds per game	APG	Assists per game	SPG	Steals per game
BPG	Blocks per game	PPG	Points per game	**Bold**	Career high

*	Led NCAA Division I

=== College ===
Year	Team	GP	GS	MPG	FG%	3P%	FT%	RPG	APG	SPG	BPG	PPG
2018–19	Michigan State	36	0	5.8	.409	.296	.923	0.4	0.9	0.1	0.0	1.6
2019–20	Michigan State	31	1	7.5	.448	**.450**	.909	0.5	0.9	0.2	0.0	2.9
2020–21	Michigan State	19	7	16.6	.294	.327	.880	1.6	2.3	0.2	**0.1**	4.2
2021–22	Davidson	29	28	30.1	**.451**	.438	**.935**	3.2	3.3	0.8	0.0	16.1
2022–23	Davidson	**31**	**31**	**35.1**	.378	.335	.921	**4.3**	**4.5**	**1.7**	0.0	**16.3**
**Career**		146	67	18.6	.403	.376	.923	2.0	2.3	0.6	0.0	8.2
