= Malik Hall (basketball) =

American basketball player (born 2000)

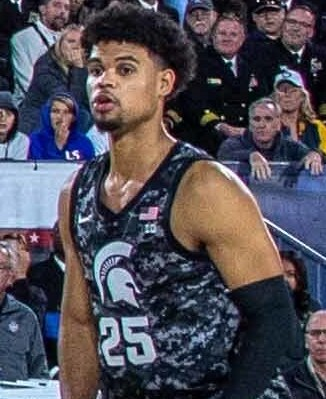
- Hall in 2022

No. 7 – Hapoel HaEmek
- Position: Power forward
- League: Israeli Basketball Premier League

Personal information
- Born: July 25, 2000 (age 26) Spokane, Washington, U.S.
- Listed height: 6 ft 8 in (2.03 m)
- Listed weight: 220 lb (100 kg)

Career information
- High school: Metea Valley (Aurora, Illinois); Old Redford Academy (Detroit, Michigan); Sunrise Christian Academy (Bel Aire, Kansas)
- College: Michigan State (2019–2024)
- NBA draft: 2024: undrafted
- Playing career: 2024–present

Career history
- 2024–2025: Greensboro Swarm
- 2025: Motor City Cruise
- 2025–2026: Ironi Kiryat Ata
- 2026–present: Hapoel HaEmek

Malik Lorenzo Hall (born July 25, 2000) is an American professional basketball player for Hapoel HaEmek of the Israeli Basketball Premier League. He played college basketball for Michigan State.

== Early life and high school career ==
Hall is the son of Lorenzo and Julie Hall, both of whom played college basketball, and he has a sister Brianna. He grew up in Aurora, Illinois, and attended Metea Valley High School for two years.

Hall transferred to Old Redford Academy in Detroit, Michigan, and averaged 26.9 points, 5.6 rebounds, 5.9 assists and 2.4 steals per game as a junior. He joined Sunrise Christian Academy in Wichita, Kansas, as a postgraduate. A four-star recruit, he was the 52nd-ranked player in the nation according to 247Sports. In November 2018, Hall committed to play college basketball for Michigan State, choosing the Spartans over offers from Purdue, Oregon, Oklahoma and others.

== College career ==
As a freshman, Hall averaged 4.6 points and 3.7 rebounds per game, shooting 53.6% from the field, primarily coming off the bench. He averaged 5.2 points and 4.2 rebounds per game as a sophomore.

As a junior, Hall averaged 8.9 points and 4.6 rebounds per game, shooting 51.5% from the field and 42.6 percent from three-point range. He was hampered by a knee injury during his senior season which caused him to miss 11 games. Hall averaged 8.9 points, 4.3 rebounds, and 1.2 assists per game.

He announced he would return for a fifth and final season with the Spartans granted due to the COVID-19 pandemic, joining teammate Tyson Walker. On February 14, 2024, Hall scored a career-high 29 points and added 10 rebounds in an 80–72 win over Penn State. He averaged 12.7 points, 5.7 rebounds, and 1.9 assists per game and shot 52.5% from the floor and made 32.8 percent of his attempts from three-point range, earning Honorable Mention All-Big Ten honors.

== Professional career ==
After not being picked in the 2024 NBA draft, Hall joined the Charlotte Hornets for NBA Summer League. Hall was selected with the eighth overall pick in the 2024 NBA G League draft by the Greensboro Swarm. He played 11 games for the Swarm averaging 4.0 points, 3.8 rebounds, 0.7 assists, and 13.7 minutes per game, while shooting 55.6% from the field.

He was then acquired by the Motor City Cruise in January 2025. Hall played 20 games and averaged 9.7 points, 4.5 rebounds, 1.0 steals, and 24.5 minutes per game while shooting 63.3% from the field.

On June 5, 2025, he signed with Ironi Kiryat Ata B.C. of the Israeli Basketball Premier League. In 2025-26, in 21 games he averaged 15.4 points, 9.0 rebounds, 1.7 assists, and 28.1 minutes per game, while shooting 57.7% from the floor, and 48.1% from three-point range.

In 2026-27 he is playing for Hapoel HaEmek of the Israeli Basketball Premier League.

== Career statistics ==
Legend
| GP | Games played | GS | Games started | MPG | Minutes per game |
| FG% | Field goal percentage | 3P% | 3-point field goal percentage | FT% | Free throw percentage |
| RPG | Rebounds per game | APG | Assists per game | SPG | Steals per game |
| BPG | Blocks per game | PPG | Points per game | **Bold** | Career high |

=== College ===
| Year | Team | GP | GS | MPG | FG% | 3P% | FT% | RPG | APG | SPG | BPG | PPG |
|---|---|---|---|---|---|---|---|---|---|---|---|---|
| 2019–20 | Michigan State | 31 | 9 | 15.9 | **.536** | .333 | .727 | 3.7 | 1.2 | .3 | .3 | 4.6 |
| 2020–21 | Michigan State | 28 | 9 | 17.5 | .489 | .364 | .695 | 4.2 | 1.3 | .4 | .2 | 5.0 |
| 2021–22 | Michigan State | **36** | 7 | 21.8 | .515 | **.426** | .690 | 4.6 | 1.1 | **.6** | .2 | 8.9 |
| 2022–23 | Michigan State | 23 | 5 | 25.7 | .436 | .327 | **.846** | 4.3 | 1.2 | .5 | .4 | 8.9 |
| 2023–24 | Michigan State | 35 | **34** | **28.6** | .525 | .328 | .728 | **5.7** | **1.9** | .5 | **.3** | **12.7** |
| Career | | 153 | 64 | 22.0 | .504 | .362 | .732 | 4.6 | 1.3 | .5 | .3 | 8.2 |
