= Mady Sissoko =

Malian basketball player (born 2000)

- Mady Sissoko

No. 44 – Beşiktaş Fuzul
- Position: Center / power forward
- League: BSL; EuroLeague

Personal information
- Born: 20 December 2000 (age 25) Tangafoya, Bafoulabé, Mali
- Listed height: 2.06 m (6 ft 9 in)
- Listed weight: 113 kg (249 lb)

Career information
- High school: Wasatch Academy (Mount Pleasant, Utah)
- College: Michigan State (2020–2024); California (2024–2025)
- NBA draft: 2025: undrafted
- Playing career: 2025–present

Career history
- 2025–2026: Pallacanestro Trieste
- 2026: Real Madrid
- 2026–present: Beşiktaş

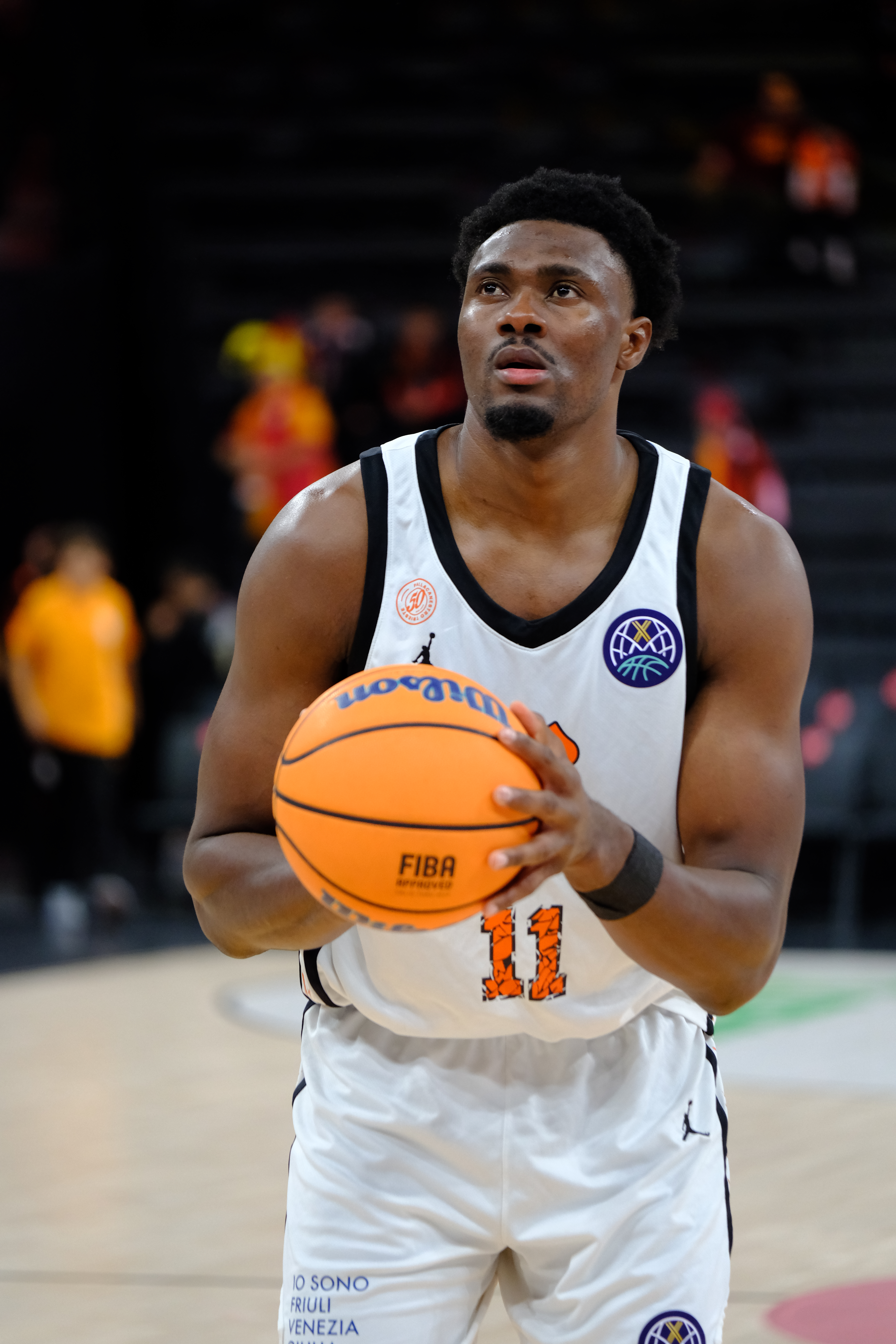
Sissoko with Pallacanestro Trieste in 2025

Mady Goundo Sissoko (born 20 December 2000) is a Malian professional basketball player for Beşiktaş of the Turkish Basketbol Süper Ligi (BSL) and the EuroLeague. He played college basketball for the California Golden Bears and the Michigan State Spartans. At the high school level, Sissoko competed for Wasatch Academy in Mount Pleasant, Utah and was a consensus four-star recruit.

== Early life ==
Sissoko was born in Tangafoya, a village in the rural commune of Bafoulabé in Mali, where he grew up without electricity, running water, cars or radios. He worked by hand on his family's farm, as his village did not have modern farming equipment. At age 15, Sissoko's basketball potential drew the attention of Michael Clayton, administrator of the Utah Valley Eye Center, who was making an annual trip to Africa with doctors performing free cataract surgeries on villagers. Sissoko's brother, a member of the Malian Armed Forces who served as the doctors' armed security personnel, had asked Clayton about the possibility of Sissoko attending school and playing basketball in the United States. After being impressed by his height and athleticism, Clayton recommended Sissoko to his friend, a coach at Wasatch Academy in Mount Pleasant, Utah, before helping him move there to play basketball.

== High school career ==
As a freshman at Wasatch Academy, Sissoko spoke little English and had a limited knowledge of basketball and received limited playing time. After the season, he quickly improved his game with the Utah Mountain Stars Amateur Athletic Union program. Sissoko became a rotation player in his sophomore season and entered the starting lineup as a junior. In his junior season, he averaged 12.5 points and 8.9 rebounds per game. Before his senior year, Sissoko broke his right hand in an all-terrain vehicle accident during an official recruiting visit to Brigham Young University. The injury delayed the start of his senior season. As a senior, he averaged 12.2 points and 6.7 rebounds per game for one of the best high school teams in the country, helping the team to a 27–2 record. Sissoko's senior season was ended prematurely due to the coronavirus pandemic. He was named co-winner of the Heart Award for the Iverson Classic, which was not played because of the pandemic.

=== Recruiting ===
Sissoko was a consensus four-star recruit and one of the best centers in the 2020 class. He was ranked the No. 42 player and No. 8 center in his class by 247Sports. On 10 September 2019, he committed to play college basketball for Michigan State. Sissoko failed the English test given to arriving non-English speaking students, and had to take five six-week condensed ESL classes in order to enroll at MSU.

College recruiting
Name	Hometown	School	Height	Weight	Commit date
Mady Sissoko; C	Bafoulabé, Mali	Wasatch Academy (UT)	6 ft 9 in (2.06 m)	220 lb (100 kg)	Sep 10, 2019
Mady Sissoko; C	Recruit ratings: Rivals: 247Sports: ESPN: (87)				
Overall recruit ranking: Rivals: 46 247Sports: 42 ESPN: 40
Note: In many cases, Scout, Rivals, 247Sports, On3, and ESPN may conflict in their listings of height and weight.; In these cases, the average was taken. ESPN grades are on a 100-point scale.; Sources: "Michigan State 2020 Basketball Commits". Rivals.; "2020 Michigan State Spartans Recruiting Class". ESPN.; "2020 Team Ranking". Rivals.

== College career ==
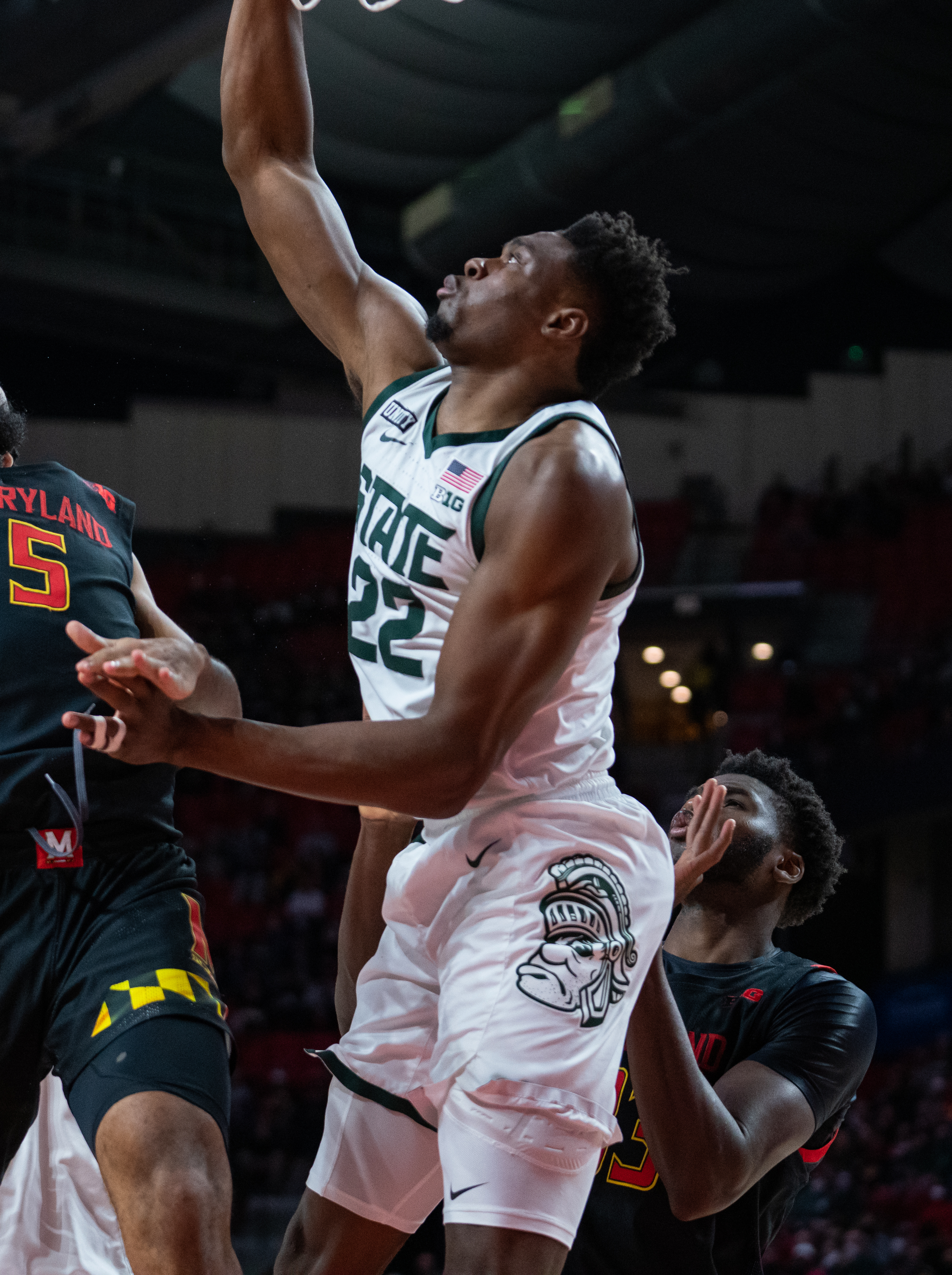
Sissoko with Michigan State in 2022

Sissoko played a limited role as a freshman at Michigan State, averaging 1.1 points and 1.8 rebounds per game. By his third season, Sissoko had become a regular playing 21.4 minutes per game, averaging 5.1 points and 6.1 rebounds. Sissoko graduated with a degree in environmental science in 2024, but with one extra year of eligibility caused by the COVID-19 pandemic, transferred himself to the University of California, Berkeley.

== Career statistics ==
Legend
GP	Games played	GS	Games started	MPG	Minutes per game
FG%	Field goal percentage	3P%	3-point field goal percentage	FT%	Free throw percentage
RPG	Rebounds per game	APG	Assists per game	SPG	Steals per game
BPG	Blocks per game	PPG	Points per game	**Bold**	Career high

=== College ===
Year	Team	GP	GS	MPG	FG%	3P%	FT%	RPG	APG	SPG	BPG	PPG
2020–21	Michigan State	25	0	5.4	.588	–	.438	1.8	.0	.0	.4	1.1
2021–22	Michigan State	30	0	4.5	.632	–	.429	1.0	.0	.0	.4	1.1
2022–23	Michigan State	34	**33**	21.4	.612	–	.635	6.1	**.5**	.3	.8	5.1
2023–24	Michigan State	**35**	26	15.2	.568	–	**.705**	5.1	.3	.2	.4	3.3
2024–25	California	32	32	**27.0**	**.653**	–	.696	**8.2**	.4	**.5**	**1.1**	**8.2**
Career		156	91	15.3	.619	–	.644	4.6	.3	.2	.6	3.9

== Professional career ==
After going undrafted in the 2025 NBA draft, Sissoko signed a free agent trial with the Oklahoma City Thunder to try for the team in the NBA Summer League.

On August 14, 2025, he signed with Pallacanestro Trieste of the Italian Lega Basket Serie A (LBA).

On June 1, 2026, he signed with Real Madrid of the Liga ACB and EuroLeague.

On July 3, 2026, he signed with Beşiktaş of the Basketbol Süper Ligi (BSL).

== Personal life ==
Sissoko is the son of Kassim Sissoko and Fatoumata Kanouté. He has six sisters and three brothers. Michael Clayton, who facilitated his move to the United States, serves as his legal guardian. Given as an international student he could not profit off the NCAA's name, image, and likeness compensation, Sissoko set up a charitable foundation, which has since financed the building of a school, a well and an irrigation system in Tangafoya.
