= Aaron Henry (basketball) =

American basketball player (born 1999)

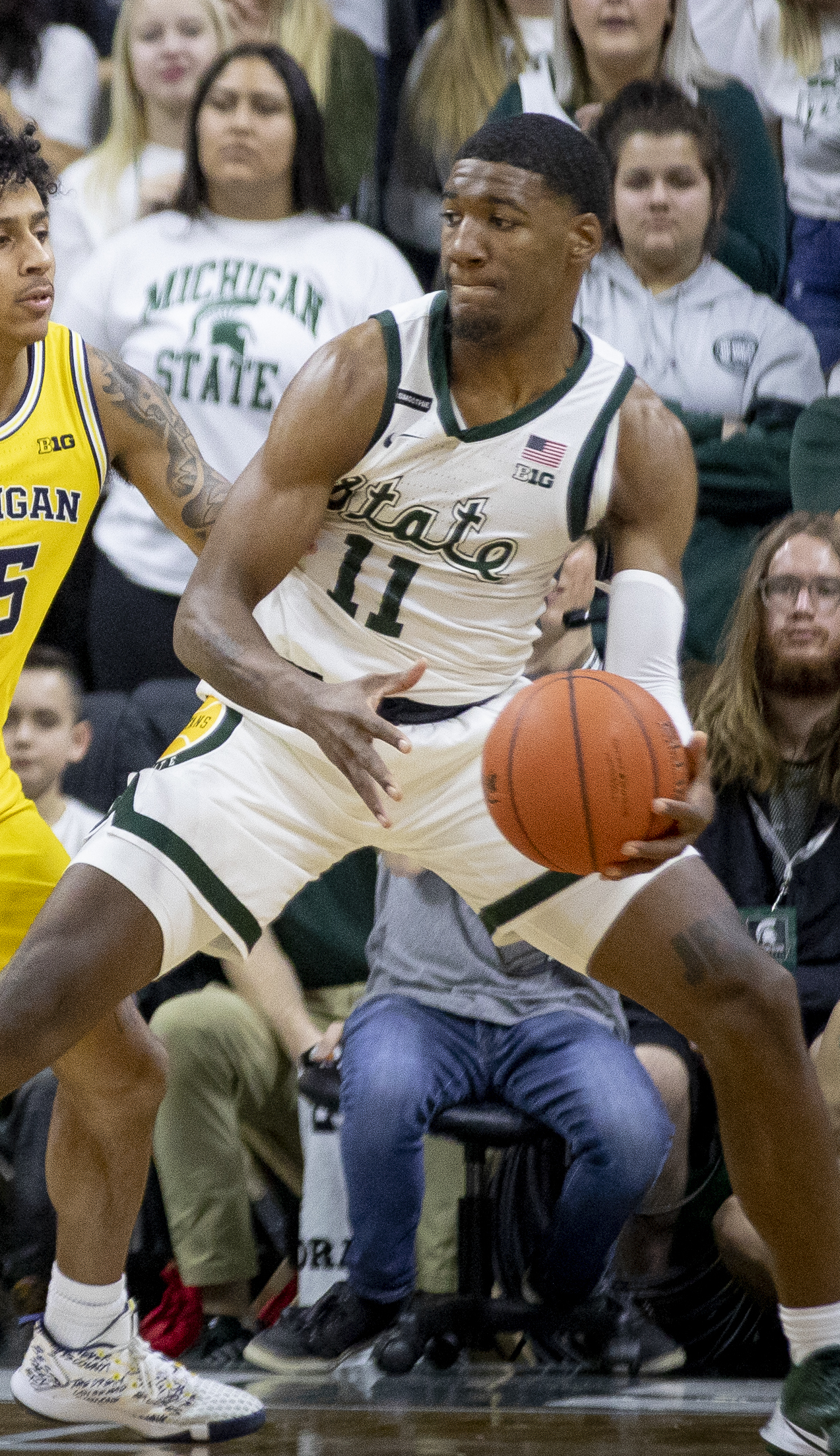
- Henry in January 2020

No. 50 – Nagoya Diamond Dolphins
- Position: Small forward
- League: B.League

Personal information
- Born: August 30, 1999 (age 27) Louisville, Kentucky, U.S.
- Listed height: 6 ft 6 in (1.98 m)
- Listed weight: 210 lb (95 kg)

Career information
- High school: Ben Davis (Indianapolis, Indiana)
- College: Michigan State (2018–2021)
- NBA draft: 2021: undrafted
- Playing career: 2021–present

Career history
- 2021–2022: Philadelphia 76ers
- 2021–2022: →Delaware Blue Coats
- 2022: Delaware Blue Coats
- 2022–2023: Metropolitans 92
- 2023–2025: Fighting Eagles Nagoya
- 2025–present: Nagoya Diamond Dolphins

Career highlights
- B.League Steals Leader (2025); Third-team All-Big Ten (2021); Big Ten All-Defensive Team (2021)
- Stats at NBA.com
- Stats at Basketball Reference

Aaron James Henry (born August 30, 1999) is an American professional basketball player for Nagoya Diamond Dolphins of the Japanese B.League. He previously played for the Philadelphia 76ers of the National Basketball Association (NBA) and the Delaware Blue Coats of the NBA G League. He played college basketball for the Michigan State Spartans.

== Early life ==
Henry was born in Louisville, Kentucky but moved to Indianapolis, Indiana while he was a child. He attended Ben Davis High School, where he was a four-year starter on the school's basketball team. As a junior, he averaged 14.2 points, 6.6 rebounds, 3.8 assists per game and was named to the first team of the Indy-Area Super Team by the Indianapolis Star and second team All-State by the Associated Press as he helped lead the Giants to the 2017 4A State Championship. Henry led the Giants to a sectional title while averaging 17 points, 8.8 rebounds and four assists in his senior season and was named first team All-State by the Associated Press and to the second team by USA Today. A three-star recruit, he committed to playing college basketball for Michigan State over offers from Butler, Illinois, Ohio State and Xavier.

== College career ==
As a freshman Henry played in all 39 of Michigan State's games, starting 22 of the final 23 contests and averaging 6.1 points and 3.8 rebounds per game. He averaged 9 points and 5.6 rebounds during postseason play as whole and 10.4 points and 5.2 rebounds in the NCAA Tournament. Henry scored a season high 20 points to go with eight rebounds and six assists against LSU in the Sweet Sixteen of the 2019 NCAA tournament.

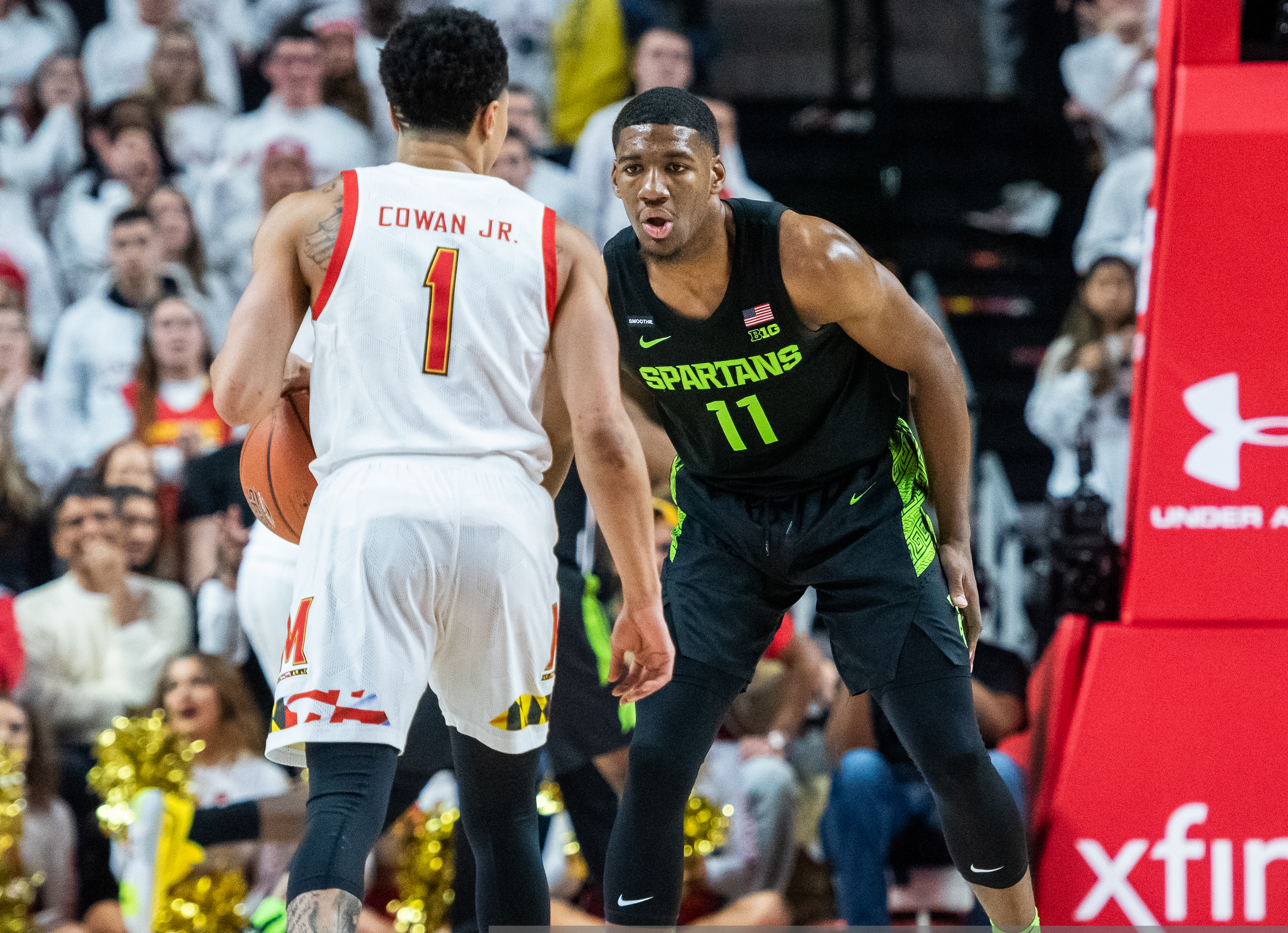
Henry defending Anthony Cowan Jr.

Henry was named the 90th-best collegiate basketball player going into the 2019–20 season by CBS Sports. He scored 18 points in a 71–66 loss to Virginia Tech on November 25, 2019. On February 25, 2020, Henry scored 17 points in a 78–70 win over Iowa, and coach Tom Izzo called him the team's best player in the game. Henry averaged 10 points, 4.6 rebounds and 2.9 assists per game during his sophomore season. Following the season, he declared for the 2020 NBA draft but did not hire an agent. He ultimately decided to withdraw and return to Michigan State for his junior season.

As a junior, Henry averaged 15.4 points, 5.6 rebounds and 3.6 assists per game. He was named third-team All-Big Ten. Following the season he declared for the 2021 NBA draft, forgoing his remaining college eligibility.

== Professional career ==
=== Philadelphia 76ers (2021–2022) ===
After going undrafted in the 2021 NBA draft, Henry signed a two-way contract with the Philadelphia 76ers on August 8, 2021, splitting time with their G League affiliate, the Delaware Blue Coats. Henry was waived by the 76ers on January 11, 2022.

=== Delaware Blue Coats (2022) ===
On January 18, 2022, Henry was reacquired and activated by the Delaware Blue Coats.

=== Metropolitans 92 (2022–2023) ===
On August 6, 2022, he has signed with Metropolitans 92 of the LNB Pro A. He suffered a season-ending quadriceps injury in December 2022.

=== Fighting Eagles Nagoya (2023–2025) ===
On June 30, 2023, Henry signed with Fighting Eagles Nagoya of the Japanese B.League. On May 28, 2024, he re-signed with Fighting Eagles Nagoya.

=== Nagoya Diamond Dolphins (2025–present) ===
On June 11, 2025, Henry signed with Nagoya Diamond Dolphins of the Japanese B.League.

== Career statistics ==
Legend
GP	Games played	GS	Games started	MPG	Minutes per game
FG%	Field goal percentage	3P%	3-point field goal percentage	FT%	Free throw percentage
RPG	Rebounds per game	APG	Assists per game	SPG	Steals per game
BPG	Blocks per game	PPG	Points per game	**Bold**	Career high

=== College ===
Year	Team	GP	GS	MPG	FG%	3P%	FT%	RPG	APG	SPG	BPG	PPG
2018–19	Michigan State	**39**	22	22.1	**.495**	**.385**	.692	3.8	1.6	.6	.5	6.1
2019–20	Michigan State	30	**29**	29.1	.441	.344	.703	4.6	2.9	.8	.6	10.0
2020–21	Michigan State	28	26	**32.5**	.449	.296	**.762**	**5.6**	**3.6**	**1.3**	**1.3**	**15.4**
Career		97	77	27.2	.457	.333	.729	4.6	2.6	.9	.7	10.0

=== NBA ===
Year	Team	GP	GS	MPG	FG%	3P%	FT%	RPG	APG	SPG	BPG	PPG
2021–22	Philadelphia	6	0	2.8	.200	.000	—	.2	.0	.0	.3	.3
Career		6	0	2.8	.200	.000	—	.2	.0	.0	.3	.3

=== B.League ===
Year	Team	GP	GS	MPG	FG%	3P%	FT%	RPG	APG	SPG	BPG	PPG
2023–24	FE Nagoya	**56**	33	24.0	.463	**.333**	**.733**	5.5	3.6	1.3	.7	16.7
2024–25	FE Nagoya	51	**49**	**33.1**	**.468**	.324	.706	**6.6**	**4.6**	**2.4**	**.9**	**20.1**
2025–26	Nagoya D	12	12	31.3	.455	.36	.761	5.7	4.4	2.8	1.3	17.1
Career (～2024-2025)		107	82	28.3	.466	.328	.719	6.1	4.1	1.8	0.8	18.3
