= 2019–20 Michigan State Spartans men's basketball team =

American college basketball season

2019–20 Michigan State Spartans men's basketball

Big Ten regular season co-champions
- Conference: Big Ten Conference

Ranking
- Coaches: No. 12
- AP: No. 9
- Record: 22–9 (14–6 Big Ten)
- Head coach: Tom Izzo (25th season)
- Associate head coach: Dwayne Stephens (17th season)
- Assistant coaches: Mike Garland (13th season); Dane Fife (9th season)
- Captains: Cassius Winston; Joshua Langford; Kyle Ahrens; Xavier Tillman
- Home arena: Breslin Center

2019–20 Big Ten Conference men's basketball standings
	Conf.				Overall
Team	W		L	PCT	W		L	PCT
No. 17 Wisconsin	14	–	6	.700	21	–	10	.677
No. 9 Michigan State	14	–	6	.700	22	–	9	.710
No. 12 Maryland	14	–	6	.700	24	–	7	.774
No. 21 Illinois	13	–	7	.650	21	–	10	.677
No. 25 Iowa	11	–	9	.550	20	–	11	.645
Penn State	11	–	9	.550	21	–	10	.677
No. 19 Ohio State	11	–	9	.550	21	–	10	.677
Rutgers	11	–	9	.550	20	–	11	.645
Michigan	10	–	10	.500	19	–	12	.613
Purdue	9	–	11	.450	16	–	15	.516
Indiana	9	–	11	.450	20	–	12	.625
Minnesota	8	–	12	.400	15	–	16	.484
Northwestern	3	–	17	.150	8	–	23	.258
Nebraska	2	–	18	.100	7	–	25	.219
The 2020 Big Ten tournament was canceled prior to the second round due to the COVID-19 pandemic. Rankings from AP poll

The 2019–20 Michigan State Spartans men's basketball team represented Michigan State University in the 2019–20 NCAA Division I men's basketball season. The Spartans were led by 25th-year head coach Tom Izzo and play their home games at Breslin Center in East Lansing, Michigan as members of the Big Ten Conference.

With a win against Ohio State on March 8, 2020, the Spartans earned a share of their third straight Big Ten regular season championship. The Spartans finished the season 22–9, 14–6 in Big Ten play to finish in a three-way tie for first place. Their season ended following the cancellation of postseason tournaments due to the COVID-19 pandemic.

On January 5, in a game against rival Michigan, senior point guard Cassius Winston recorded nine assists to move his career total over 800 making him the first Big Ten basketball player to ever record more than 1,600 points and 800 assists in a career. On January 17, Winston recorded his 817th career assist moving him past Mateen Cleaves for the most assists in Big Ten history.

Cassius Winston was a consensus All-American for the second consecutive year, becoming only the second Spartan to become an All-American in more than one season. Winston is one of only four players in Division I history with at least 1,900 points and 850 assists for a career and was one of just seven Division I players to average at least 18.0 points, 5.5 assists, and 2.0 rebounds per game on the season.

With a win over Maryland on February 29, Tom Izzo earned his 300th career Big Ten win, leaving him 53 victories behind the all-time leader Bob Knight. The Spartans began the season as the preseason No. 1 in both the AP and Coaches polls for the first time in school history.

== Previous season ==
The Spartans finished the 2018–19 season 32–7, 16–4 to earn a share of the Big Ten championship. As the No. 1 seed in the Big Ten tournament, they defeated Ohio State, Wisconsin, and Michigan (for the third time on the season) to win the tournament championship. The win over Ohio State on March 15, 2019 marked Tom Izzo's 600th career win. The Tournament win marked the school's sixth tournament championship, the most in the Big Ten. As a result of the Tournament victory, the Spartans received the conference's automatic bid to the NCAA tournament as the No. 2 seed in the East Region. In the First Round of the NCAA Tournament, MSU defeated No. 15-seeded Bradley two days before beating No. 10-seeded Minnesota to advance to the team's first Sweet Sixteen since 2015. In the regional semifinals, the Spartans defeated No. 3-seeded LSU to advance to the Elite Eight. There they defeated overall No. 1-seed Duke to advance to the school's 10th Final Four and eighth under head coach, Tom Izzo. In the National Semifinals, Michigan State lost to No. 3-seed Texas Tech.

The Spartans were led by Big Ten Player of the Year, junior Cassius Winston, who won the NCAA Tournament East Region's award for Most Outstanding Player, averaging 18.9 points and 7.5 assists per game on the season. He and sophomore Xavier Tillman were both selected for the East Region All-Tournament team.

== Offseason ==
=== Departures ===
On April 19, 2019, Nick Ward announced he would declare for the NBA draft and sign with an agent. He announced he did not intend to return to MSU despite new draft rules which would allow him to do so. Ward was not selected for the NBA draft.

Name	Number	Pos.	Height	Weight	Year	Hometown	Notes
Kenny Goins	25	F	6'7"	230	RS SR	Troy, MI	Graduated
Matt McQuaid	20	G	6'5"	200	SR	Duncanville, TX	Graduated
Nick Ward	44	F	6'9"	245	JR	Gahanna, OH	turned pro

=== Returning players ===
On April 19, 2019, Cassius Winston announced he would not enter the NBA draft and would return to school for his senior season.

=== Recruiting class ===
On September 22, 2018, four-star point guard Rocket Watts committed to the Spartans. On November 1, 2018, four-star forward Malik Hall committed to MSU. On December 6, MSU once again missed out on a top recruit as No. 2-ranked Vernon Carey chose Duke over the Spartans. On March 10, 2019, the day after witnessing MSU defeat Michigan to win a share of the Big Ten championship, three-star forward Julius Marble announced he had committed to MSU.

College recruiting
Name	Hometown	School	Height	Weight	Commit date
Malik Hall; SF	Aurora, IL	Sunrise Christian Academy	6 ft 7 in (2.01 m)	210 lb (95 kg)	Nov 21, 2018
Malik Hall; SF	Recruit ratings: Scout: Rivals: 247Sports: (88)				
Julius Marble II; PF	Dallas, TX	Jesuit High School	6 ft 8 in (2.03 m)	225 lb (102 kg)	Apr 24, 2019
Julius Marble II; PF	Recruit ratings: Rivals: 247Sports:				
Rocket Watts; PG	Detroit, MI	SPIRE Institute	6 ft 2 in (1.88 m)	175 lb (79 kg)	Apr 17, 2019
Rocket Watts; PG	Recruit ratings: Scout: Rivals: 247Sports: (89)				
Overall recruit ranking:
Note: In many cases, Scout, Rivals, 247Sports, On3, and ESPN may conflict in their listings of height and weight.; In these cases, the average was taken. ESPN grades are on a 100-point scale.; Sources:

=== Incoming transfers ===
On May 28, 2019, Marquette forward Joey Hauser announced he would transfer to MSU. On September 11, Tom Izzo stated that the school had requested a waiver from the NCAA to allow Hauser to play in the 2019–20 season, but Izzo did not expect the waiver to be granted. Izzo later announced that the waiver had been denied, but that the school had appealed the ruling. On November 21, Izzo announced that the appeal had formally been denied. Izzo stated he was "devastated" by the denial and announced he had resigned from his position on the board of the National Association of Basketball Coaches. Hauser sat out the 2019–20 season as a result, but will have at least two years of eligibility left beginning in the 2020–21 season.

=== Early offseason rankings ===
In April 2019, most early pollsters listed Michigan State as the No. 1 team in the country for the 2019–20 season. These included ESPN (No. 1), Sports Illustrated (No. 1), Yahoo! Sports (No. 1), USA Today (No. 1), NBC Sports (No. 1), CBS Sports (No. 1), and Bleacher Report (No. 1). Only the Sporting News failed to list MSU No. 1 instead listing them as No. 2.

In a poll of over 100 college basketball coaches conducted by CBS Sports, the Spartans were picked to win the 2020 National Championship, receiving a record 54% of the votes. Cassius Winston was selected as the best player for the season, receiving a record 50% of the votes.

== Preseason ==
=== Preseason rankings ===
In its preseason college preview, Lindy's Sports ranked Michigan State No. 1 in the country and picked the Spartans to win the Big Ten. Athlon Sports also ranked MSU as No. 1 in the country and also picked the Spartans to win the Big Ten. NBC Sports and Street and Smith also named MSU No. 1 in the country.

For the first time in school history, the Spartans were ranked No.1 in the Preseason AP Poll. The Spartans were also ranked No. 1 in the preseason Coaches Poll, also for the first time in school history.

=== Preseason Big Ten polls ===
Prior to the conference's annual media day, unofficial awards and a poll were chosen by a panel of 28 writers, two for each team in the conference. Michigan State was the near unanimous selection to win the conference, receiving 27 of 28 first-place votes.

At Big Ten media day, Cassius Winston was a unanimous selection as the preseason player of the year. Winston was also a unanimous selection to the 10-member All-Big Ten Preseason Team. Xavier Tillman was also selected to the team.

CBS Sports picked MSU to win the Big Ten while naming Winston as the Preseason Player of the Year and Tom Izzo as Preseason Coach of the Year.

=== Preseason awards ===
CBS Sports named Cassius Winston to the Preseason All-American first team and picked him as Preseason Player of the Year. CBS also named Tom Izzo as the Preseason Coach of the Year.

Winston was named to the preseason watch list for the Bob Cousy Point Guard of the Year Award. Xavier Tillman was named to the preseason watch list for the Karl Malone Power Forward of the Year Award. Joshua Langford was named to the preseason watch list for the Jerry West Shooting Guard of the Year Award.

=== Preseason scrimmage ===
For the second straight season, the Spartans lost to Gonzaga in a preseason scrimmage, this time the scrimmage occurred in Denver, Colorado on October 19, 2019. Cassius Winston led the Spartans with 20 points and seven assists. Aaron Henry added 13 points while Xavier Tillman scored six points and had 10 rebounds. MSU lost 103–87 in the scrimmage.

=== Joshua Langford injury ===
On October 22, Tom Izzo announced that Joshua Langford, who only played in 13 games the previous season due to a foot injury, had suffered a setback and would not be able to play to start the season. Izzo said Langford would be out indefinitely and would be reevaluated in January 2020. On December 19, Izzo announced that Langford would be out for the season and would not return.

=== Exhibition ===
On October 29, the Spartans played an exhibition game at Breslin Center against Albion College. Cassius Winston's two younger brothers, Zach and Khy, were on the Albion team, though Zach did not play due to an injury. Mark "Rocket" Watts started as the shooting guard with Langford out and Thomas Kithier started at power forward. Xavier Tillman led MSU with 19 points and eight rebounds while Winston scored 16 points and added nine assists. Kithier grabbed a game-high 11 rebounds as the Spartans used several different lineups in the tune-up prior to the season opener on November 5. MSU won easily 85–50.

== Regular season ==
=== Early non-conference games ===
==== Kentucky ====
The Spartans took on No. 2-ranked Kentucky to open the season on November 5 at the Champions Classic. The game was played at Madison Square Garden in New York. MSU trailed for most of the game, falling behind every time they were able to move close to the Wildcats. Cassius Winston led the Spartans with 21 points, but no other Spartan scored more than Gabe Brown's 10 points. MSU shot less than 20% from three and under 40% from the floor. They were able to narrow the Kentucky lead to two points with just over a minute remaining, but were unable to complete the comeback, losing 69–62. The Spartans turned the ball over 15 times in the loss.

==== Binghamton ====
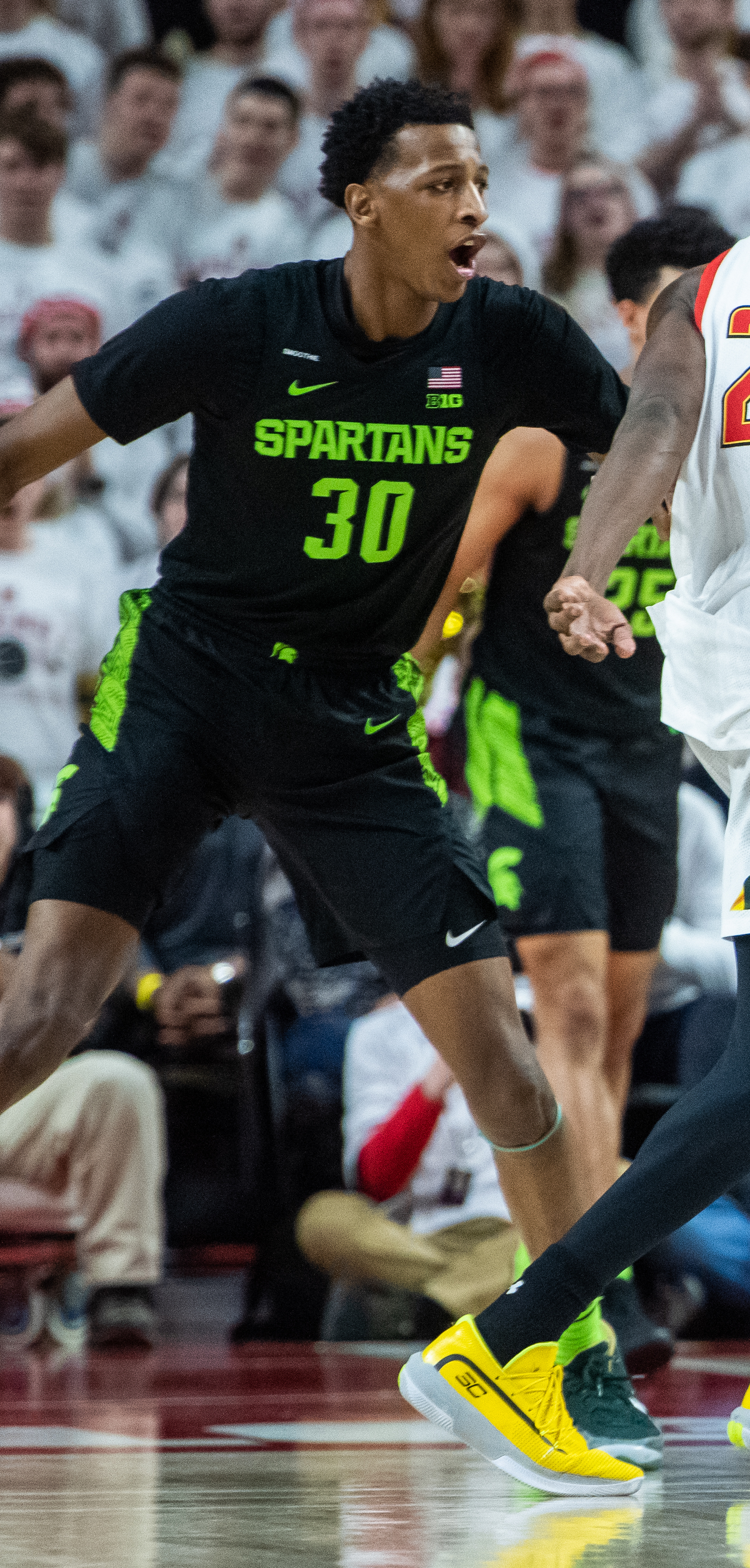
Marcus Bingham Jr. in 2020

MSU returned home to take on Binghamton in their home opener on November 10. Shortly before the game, it was revealed that Cassius Winston's brother Zach had been hit by a train and died the night before. It was later announced that Zach had committed suicide. Winston chose to play in the game and scored 17 points and dished out 11 assists. Xavier Tillman also scored 17, while Aaron Henry had 16 and Marcus Bingham Jr. had 13. The Spartans led by 31 at the half and won easily, 100–47. MSU continued to struggle from three, making only 28% of their three-pointers, but did shoot over 63% from the floor and had only four turnovers in the easy win. Michigan State had a moment of silence before the game in Zach Winston's memory. The win evened MSU's record at 1–1 on the season.

==== Seton Hall ====
The newly third-ranked Spartans traveled to take on No. 12 Seton Hall in Newark, New Jersey on November 14 as part of the Gavitt Tipoff games. Seton Hall guard Myles Powell, who suffered an ankle injury in his team's previous game, surprisingly started and scored 37 points against the Spartans as the game remained tight throughout. Cassius Winston, playing in his second game since his brother's death, scored 21 points for the Spartans, but it was Malik Hall who helped the Spartans to the win, scoring 17 points in 19 minutes on a perfect 7–7 from the floor. Rocket Watts added a clutch three-pointer after missing a layup on the prior possession to keep the Spartans in the game. Due mostly to Hall's 3–3 from three, the Spartans shot 44% from behind the arc. Hall hit the game-winning layup with less than a minute remaining as the Spartans pulled out the 76–73 win. The Spartans moved to 2–1 on the season with the win.

==== Charleston Southern ====
The Spartans returned home to face Charleston Southern on November 18. Aaron Henry did not play in the game due to ankle injuries suffered in the Seton Hall game. Xavier Tillman scored a career-high 21 points and grabbed 10 rebounds as MSU destroyed Charleston Southern 94–46. Gabe Brown made his first career start and scored 12 points including a couple of impressive dunks. Rocket Watts scored a career-high 11 in the win. Following the game, Winston addressed the crowd in his first public comments since the loss of his brother. MSU moved to 3–1 with the win.

==== Maui Invitational ====
===== Virginia Tech =====
MSU traveled to Hawaii to participate in the Maui Invitational with games beginning November 25. In the first game against Virginia Tech, Cassius Winston suffered foul trouble and was held to only seven points and two assists. The Spartans had problems limiting Tech's three-point shooting, allowing the Hokies to shoot over 47% from three. Aaron Henry led the Spartans with 18 points while Xavier Tillman had 14 rebounds. However, a 10-point deficit late proved too much for the Spartans to overcome as they were shockingly defeated 71–66 in the first round of the tournament. Tom Izzo publicly apologized for the loss after the game, citing Winston's recent tough times with the loss of his brother. Izzo admitted he was out-coached in the game. The loss dropped the Spartans to 3–2 on the season.

===== Georgia =====
The Spartans next faced Georgia, coached by former Izzo assistant Tom Crean, in the consolation bracket on day two of the tournament. The Spartans jumped out to an early lead over the Bulldogs as Cassius Winston rebounded from his rough first game of the tournament. Winston scored 28 points while Xavier Tillman added 15 and Aaron Henry scored 14. MSU led by more than 20 early in the second half before Georgia freshman Anthony Edwards went off, scoring 33 of his 27 points in the second half to bring Georgia within two points. The Spartans held off the Bulldogs however, winning 93–85. Tom Izzo noted after the game that he needed to persuade Winston, who was still struggling with the death of his brother, to leave the locker room to play the game. Winston responded with eight assists in the win. The win moved MSU to 4–2 on the season.

===== UCLA =====
MSU next faced UCLA in the fifth place game of the Maui Tournament. Cassius Winston again played well, scoring 20 points while Xavier Tillman had 13 points as MSU led throughout against the Bruins. Leading by as many as 15 in the second half, the Spartans won 75–62 marking the end of the tournament the team. Marcus Bingham Jr. started his second straight game, marking his first start of the season, but only played seven minutes and failed to score. MSU left Maui with a 5–2 record on the season.

==== Duke ====
The newly 11th-ranked Spartans returned home to face Duke in the ACC–Big Ten Challenge on December 3. The Spartans, who were 2–11 under Tom Izzo against Duke were run off the floor by the Blue Devils. Duke took an early lead behind former MSU recruiting target Vernon Carey and extended their lead to over 20 points in the second half. Duke shot over 56% from the field including 46% from three as they demolished the Spartans 87–75. Xavier Tillman scored 20 for the Spartans who, after being the preseason No. 1 team, dropped to 5–3 on the season. Tom Izzo again apologized for the performance after the game, saying the Spartans were "[o]utcoached, outplayed, outworked." The loss dropped MSU to 5–3 on the season.

=== Early conference game ===
==== Rutgers ====
The Spartans next welcomed Rutgers to Breslin Center on December 8 for the Big Ten opener. Michigan State led throughout the game, but was never able to pull away as Rutgers seemed to answer every MSU run. Cassius Winston led all scorers with 23 points and added seven assists and three steals. Gabe Brown started for injured Rocket Watts and scored 14 points while Xavier Tillman also scored 14. The Spartans pulled away at the end to win 77–65 and move to 1–0 in the Big Ten and 6–3 on the season.

=== Non-conference game ===
==== Oakland ====
After a week off for finals, the Spartans played Oakland at Little Caesars Arena in Detroit on December 14. MSU struggled again from three-point range, shooting only 31%, but had no problems with Oakland overall. MSU limited Oakland to 26% shooting from the field and led throughout. The Spartans led by 24 at the half and cruised for an easy 72–29 win. Only Xavier Tillman scored in double figures for the Spartans, scoring 10, while 12 other Spartans scored in the game. Cassuis Winston scored only nine points making only three of 13 shots, but added four assists. Tillman added 13 rebounds in the game. Rocket Watts missed the game with a leg injury that was considered to be minor. The win moved MSU to 7–3 on the season.

=== Second early conference game ===
==== Northwestern ====
MSU next traveled to face their second early-season Big Ten foe, Northwestern on December 18. With every other Big Ten road team losing in the early season games, MSU looked to avoid the early trend. MSU led throughout, but every time they looked to put the game away, Northwestern would narrow the lead. MSU turned the ball over 16 times, but Cassius Winston scored 21 points and Xavier Tillman added 15 as the Spartans held on for a 77–71 win. Tillman and Aaron Henry each grabbed 10 rebounds and MSU improved its three-point shooting, making 42.9%. The win moved MSU into sol possession of first place in the Big Ten with a 2–0 record and 8–3 overall.

=== Remaining non-conference games ===
==== Eastern Michigan ====
MSU returned home and out-of-conference to face Eastern Michigan December 21. EMU, who was 9–1 on the season, was no match for the Spartans. MSU dominated the Eagles, limiting them to only 10% shooting from three and 23% overall. Meanwhile, the Spartans shot 50% from three as the Spartans ran EMU out of the gym. Cassius Winston scored 21 points and added seven assists. Aaron Henry added six assists and 12 points. Foster Loyer scored a season-high 13 for the Spartans as MSU reached the 100-point mark for the second time on the season, winning 101–48. With the win, MSU's fourth straight, the Spartans moved to 9–3 on the season.

==== Western Michigan ====
After a week for Christmas break, the Spartans faced Western Michigan on December 29. Cassius Winston did not play after suffering a knee bruise earlier in the week. Foster Loyer started in his stead and scored a career-high 16 points, making all four of his three-point shots as MSU pounded Western Michigan 95–62. Xavier Tillman and Aaron Henry each added 15 points for the Spartans who ended the non-conference schedule at 10–3. Rocket Watts made his first appearance in a game since the Duke loss and scored nine points in 12 minutes. Tom Izzo did state Winston not playing was mostly precautionary and did not expect him to miss any more games.

=== Remaining conference games ===
==== Illinois ====
MSU returned to Big Ten play to face Illinois at Breslin Center on January 2, 2020. Cassius Winston returned to the lineup and MSU led from the start, leading by as many as 13 in the first half. Illinois was able to cut the lead to five at the half despite missing all 11 of their three-point shots as the Spartans led 35–30. The Spartan defense continued to play well in the second half, limiting Illinois to under 30% from the field and allowing only three made three point baskets. Meanwhile, Winston scored 21 points with six assists and four rebounds as the Spartans led by as many as 25 in the second half. Xavier Tillman scored 19 points and added seven rebounds and six assists as MSU cruised to an easy 76–56 win. Marcus Bingham Jr. failed to score for the Spartans, but grabbed 12 rebounds with five blocks and was praised for his defensive play on Illinois big men by Tom Izzo after the game. The win moved the Spartans to 11–3 on the season and to 3–0 in Big Ten play.

==== Michigan ====
The Spartans welcomed Michigan to East Lansing on January 5 for a Rivalry game having beaten the Wolverine three times the prior year. MSU took an early lead and led throughout. Michigan kept the game close for most of the first half, helped by 13 MSU turnovers. However, Michigan could not contain Cassius Winston, as he scored a career-high 32 points and added nine assists on 11–19 shooting. The nine assists moved his career total over 800 making him the first Big Ten basketball player to ever record more than 1,600 points and 800 points in a career. MSU only led by 10 at the half, but pushed the lead to as many as 18 in the second half. Xavier Tillman played well, earning a double-double with 20 points and 11 rebounds. MSU limited the Wolverines to under 22% from three and under 37% from the field as the game was never in doubt. The Spartans shot over 52% from the field and over 46% from three in the game. The win was the fourth straight by the Spartans over Michigan and the seventh straight win for MSU on the season. The win moved MSU to 4–0 in Big Ten play and 12–3 on the season.

==== Minnesota ====
Minnesota traveled to Breslin to play the Spartans on January 9. The Spartans again led through most of the first half, but Minnesota took the lead on a few occasions near the half. MSU went to the break leading 36–32. Cassius Winston came alive in the second half scoring 18 of his game-high 27 points in the half. Xavier Tillman notched 19 points and a career-high 16 rebounds as the duo led the Spartans to 74–58 win. Despite Minnesota's big man up front, the Spartans out-rebounded the Gophers 48–30 and held Minnesota to under 40% shooting in the game. The win marked the Spartans' eighth straight and moved them to 5–0 in Big Ten play and 13–3 on the season.

==== Purdue ====
MSU next headed on the road to Purdue where they had not won since 2014. MSU played poorly and was blown out by the Boilermakers, trailing by 17 at the half and losing by 29. Cassius Winston led the Spartans with 10 points as MSU could only muster 42 points in the game. Winston also turned the ball over nine times as MSU struggled mightily. Rocket Watts added 10 points in the loss, but Tom Izzo was embarrassed by the performance. Izzo stated that it was "probably the worst beating I've taken as a coach". MSU only made two three-point baskets and shot just 35% from the field in the loss. The loss dropped the Spartans to 5–1 in conference and 13–4 overall, but the Spartans remained alone in first play in the Big Ten.

==== Wisconsin ====
Three days before the Spartans returned home to face Wisconsin on January 17, the school announced that guard Kyle Ahrens would miss extended time as he looked to recover from a plethora of injuries. Michigan State did not need him against Wisconsin, as the Spartans continued to dominate at home, leading throughout and pushing the lead to over 20 at times. Cassius Winston only had six points and four rebounds, but that was enough to pass Mateen Cleaves for the Big Ten record in assists. Xavier Tillman scored 15 while Aaron Henry and Gabe Brown added 13. Rocket Watts added 11 in the easy win over the Badgers. The Spartans held Wisconsin under 36% from the field and only 21% from three in the win. Winston appeared to be pressing to set the record as he turned the ball over five times and struggled from the field. The 67–55 win moved MSU to 14–4 overall and 6–1 in Big Ten play as MSU remained alone in first place in the conference.

==== Indiana ====
After playing five of their first seven conference games on the road, the Spartans began a two-game road trip starting with Indiana on January 23. MSU started slowly, falling behind 20–8 early in the first half. MSU fought back, unlike it did against Purdue, and drew within seven at the half. The Spartans continued to narrow the lead in the second half and briefly took the lead before Indiana retook the lead and was able to hold off the Spartans. Cassius Winston led all scorers with 17, but struggled early. Aaron Henry added 12 points for the Spartans, but MSU turned the ball over 13 times as they lost 67–63. The road loss moved MSU into a first-place tie with Illinois atop the Big Ten. The loss left the Spartans at 14–5 overall and 6–2 in conference play. After the game, Tom Izzo vowed to make changes as he was unhappy with his team's play.

==== Minnesota ====
Staying on the road, the Spartans traveled to Minneapolis to face Minnesota on January 26. MSU starting lineup changed, as Tom Izzo had promised, with freshmen Rocket Watts and Malik Hall starting for sophomores Aaron Henry and Marcus Bingham. Both teams started slowly, but Minnesota missed many open looks as the Spartans took control of the game. Cassius Winston had 18 points and eight assists while Xavier Tillman notched a double double with 17 points and 10 rebounds. Minnesota trailed by double figures for most of the game and MSU won by 18, 70–52. MSU's defense suffocated the Gophers, limiting them to 17.9% from three and only 28% overall in the win. The win kept the Spartans in a first-place tie with Illinois at 7–2 and 15–5 overall.

==== Northwestern ====
The Spartans returned home to face last place Northwestern on January 29. Aaron Henry returned to the starting lineup, but struggled from the floor, not making a field goal until late in the second half. He did however have four steals and two assists. Despite this, the Spartans jumped to a big lead early in the first half behind Cassius Winston's 18 points and Xavier Tillman's 12 points, eight rebounds, and four assists. MSU led by as many as 13 in the first half. In the second half, MSU blew the Wildcats off the floor leading by as many as 36 in the easy win over Northwestern. Foster Loyer added 12 points on four three-pointers and MSU was able to rest many of their key players for large portions of the second half. The 79–50 win moved MSU a half game ahead of Illinois for the Big Ten lead at 8–2 in conference play and 16–5 overall.

==== Wisconsin ====
MSU returned to the road to play short-handed Wisconsin on February 1. On January 29, it was announced that the Badgers second-leading scorer, Kobe King, was leaving the program and that guard Brad Davison would be suspended for one game for a flagrant foul in Wisconsin's loss to Iowa on January 27. This did not seem to matter in the first half as the Badgers jumped out to an early double digit lead and looked to be on the brink of blowing out the Spartans. Trailing by 16 at the half, the Spartans mounted a vigorous comeback behind Cassius Winston's 23 points and Rocket Watts' 16 points, but Xavier Tillman missed several easy layups in the final minutes as the Spartans were unable to complete the comeback. Two Winston three-pointers at the end narrowed the gap to one as the Spartans lost 64–63. Tillman made only three of 15 shots in the game, but did add 14 rebounds. Gabe Brown did not start and only played three minutes due to illness. The loss left the Spartans tied with Illinois for first in the Big Ten at 8–3 and 16–6 overall.

==== Penn State ====
The Spartans returned home to face Penn State. The Nittany Lions had not beaten the Spartans at Breslin Center since 2009, but they started well. PSU shot over 40% from the field in the game and took a six-point lead to half time. Cassius Winston again played well, scoring a game-high 25 points, but no other Spartan reached double figures. MSU narrowed the lead in the second half as the teams exchanged leads. Penn State took a three-point lead with less than 15 seconds remaining, but Winston was fouled while making a running layup to narrow the lead to one. However, Winston missed the game-tying free throw and then missed a desperation three-pointer as the Spartans lost their second straight game 75–70. Thomas Kithier did not play in the game due to illness. MSU shot over 47% from the field in the game but turned the ball over 15 times. The loss dropped the Spartans to 8–4 in Big Ten play, 16-7 overall, and out of first place.

==== Michigan ====
MSU returned to the road to face rival Michigan on February 8. MSU trailed throughout the game and was never able to narrow the Michigan lead, losing 77–68. Cassius Winston had 20 points and Xavier Tillman scored 17, but only four other Spartans scored as MSU lost its third straight game. The loss moved MSU to 8–5 in Big Ten play and 16–8 overall.

==== Illinois ====
The Spartans then traveled to Champaign to face Illinois on February 11 having fallen out of the AP poll for the first time since the end of 2017. After struggling early in recent road tests, the Spartans jumped early on Illinois and led by 17 at the half. After pushing the lead to 20 early in the second half, the Illini fought their way back into the game and took the lead with a little more than five minutes left in the game. The Spartans, however, did not fold as they had done recently and exchanged leads with Illinois until Illini freshman big man Kofi Cockburn made two free throws with 20 seconds remaining to give Illinois the 69–68 leas. Cassius Winston then drove to the basket drawing three Illini defenders and his shot which may well have been a pass was rebounded and dunked home by Xavier Tillman with six seconds remaining. Illinois turned the ball over on their final possession as the Spartans broke their three-game losing streak. Rocket Watts exploded in the game for the Spartans, scoring 21 points on 14 shots in his return to the starting lineup. Tillman added 17 while Aaron Henry had 13 in the win. The win moved MSU to with 1.5 games of the conference lead with a 9–5 record and 17–8 overall.

==== Maryland ====
ESPN College Gameday came to East Lansing as MSU welcomed Big Ten leader Maryland to town on February 15. The Spartans again started slow, trailing by as many as 15 in the first half, but narrowed the lead to eight at halftime. MSU then took control of the game and fought their way to a seven-point lead with just over three minutes remaining. However, MSU's defense, which had held Maryland guard Anthony Cowan Jr. to two points in the second half, gave up four three-pointers on Maryland's next four possessions while the Spartans failed to score. Two free throws with little time remaining gave Maryland a 67–60 win and all but ended MSU's hopes for a conference championship. The loss moved MSU to 17–9 overall and 9–6 in Big Ten play, 2.5 games behind Maryland. MSU again struggled for scoring behind Xavier Tillman's 18 points and Cassius Winston's 14.

==== Nebraska ====
MSU returned to the road to play Nebraska on February 20. Tom Izzo started walk-on Jack Hoiberg, son of Nebraska head coach Fred Hoiberg. MSU failed to pull away through most of the first half and only led by three at the half despite making nine three-pointers in the half. Turnovers were a major story for the Spartans who turned the ball over 12 times in the first half and 21 times in the game. However, Cassius Winston, despite five turnover, scored 23 points while Gabe Brown added 17 points on five three-pointers. Kyle Ahrens added 14 as the Spartans pulled away to win by 21, 86–65. Izzo decided on the drive to the arena to start Hoiberg and Fred Hoiberg said he appreciated the gesture. The win kept the Spartans in a tie for third place in the Big Ten at 10–6 and 18–9 overall.

==== Iowa ====
With four games remaining in the regular season and the Spartans clinging to hopes of a Big Ten title, Iowa came to the Breslin Center on February 25 and dominated the first half, taking a 33–27 lead at the half. MSU's struggles in the half related to Xavier Tillman garnering two early fouls and playing only four minutes in the half. Additionally, Cassius Winston only scored one point in the half. Rocket Watts kept his team in the game scoring most of team-high 21 points in the first half. In the second half, Tillman solidified MSU's defense on Big Ten Player of the Year candidate Luka Garza and added two blocks to set the MSU career block record. Winston also came alive in the second half, scoring 19 of his 20 points to bring the Spartans back into the game. Aaron Henry scored 12 of his 17 points in the second half as the Spartans rallied to win 78–70, marking the first time on the season that the Spartans had won after trailing at the half. The win kept the Spartans in second place still two games behind Maryland at 11–6 and 19–9 overall.

==== Maryland ====
The Spartans traveled to face Maryland on February 29. MSU jumped out to a 9–0 start and led throughout the first half. Maryland did tie the game halfway through the first half, but MSU again pulled away and, helped by a three-quarters court shot by Cassius Winston at the buzzer, and led by 11 at the half. The Spartans continued to dominate the second half, leading by double digits most of the way as MSU cruised to a 78–66 win over the Terrapins. Winston had 20 points and six assists while Rocket Watts added 13 and Malik Hall scored 16. Xavier Tillman added 14 points and 12 rebounds as the Spartans drew within one game of the conference lead with the win. The win moved the Spartans to 12–6 in conference and 20–9 overall, the school's ninth straight season with at least 20 wins.

==== Penn State ====
With two games remaining in the regular season, the Spartans traveled to face Penn State on March 3. MSU did not start well as Penn State dominated the first half making 10 of 17 three pointers and leading by as many as 19 in the half. The Spartans roared back in the second half, taking the lead less than five minutes in to the half. Xavier Tillman scored a career-high 23 points and added 14 rebounds. Rocket Watts added 18 points on 20 shots and Cassius Winston scored 14 as the Spartans came back to win 79–71. The Spartans shot over 53% from the field while limiting Penn State to under 34%. The Spartan defense also held the Nittany Lions to no made three-pointers (0 for 13) in the second half as they pulled away for the win. The win, combined with a Maryland loss, moved the Spartans into a first place tie in the conference at 13–6 and 21–9 overall.

==== Ohio State ====
In their final regular season game, the Spartans faced Ohio State at Breslin for Senior Day and with a chance to win a third straight Big Ten regular season championship. MSU jumped out to an early lead, leading by as many as 12 in the first half, but Ohio State was able to close the deficit to four before Xavier Tillman made a fall-away jumper as the first half expired to give MSU a 38–32 halftime lead. Cassius Winston, on his Senior Day, took over in the second half and scored a game-high 27 points and dished out six assists. Rocket Watts continued his strong play, scoring 19 points, while Tillman added 15 as the Spartans extended their lead to 20 with more than two minutes remaining in the game. MSU then substituted its seniors out of the game as Winston, Kyle Ahrens, and Connor George kissed the Spartan logo to cheers from the MSU crowd. MSU held on for the win, 80–69, securing their third straight Big Ten regular season championship, their 10th under Tom Izzo. The win moved the Spartans to 14–6 and 22–9 overall. The game ended up being the final game of the season for the Spartans.

== Postseason ==
=== Big Ten tournament ===
Due to tie-breaking rules, the Spartans received the No. 2 seed in the Big Ten tournament. However, the tournament was canceled before the Spartans played their first game, due to ongoing concerns about the COVID-19 pandemic.

=== NCAA Tournament ===
Like the Big Ten tournament, the NCAA tournament was canceled due to the COVID-19 outbreak in the United States.

== Roster ==
2019–20 Michigan State Spartans men's basketball team
Players
Coaches

Pos.	#	Name	Height	Weight	Year	Previous school	Hometown
G/F	0	Kyle Ahrens (C)	6 ft 6 in (1.98 m)	210 lb (95 kg)	RS Sr	Versailles HS	Versailles, OH
F	30	Marcus Bingham Jr.	6 ft 11 in (2.11 m)	225 lb (102 kg)	So	Catholic Central HS	Grand Rapids, MI
F	44	Gabe Brown	6 ft 7 in (2.01 m)	210 lb (95 kg)	So	Belleville HS	Ypsilanti, MI
C	40	Braden Burke (W)	7 ft 0 in (2.13 m)	245 lb (111 kg)	RS Jr	Lakeshore HS; Robert Morris	Stevensville, MI
G	41	Conner George	6 ft 4 in (1.93 m)	205 lb (93 kg)	RS Sr	Okemos HS	Okemos, MI
F	25	Malik Hall	6 ft 7 in (2.01 m)	215 lb (98 kg)	Fr	Sunrise Christian Academy	Aurora, IL
F	20	Joey Hauser (redshirt)	6 ft 9 in (2.06 m)	220 lb (100 kg)	RS So	Marquette; Stevens Point HS	Stevens Point, WI
F	11	Aaron Henry	6 ft 6 in (1.98 m)	210 lb (95 kg)	So	Ben Davis HS	Indianapolis, IN
G	10	Jack Hoiberg (W)	5 ft 11 in (1.8 m)	175 lb (79 kg)	RS So	Hinsdale Central	Burr Ridge, IL
G	13	Steve Izzo (W)	5 ft 8 in (1.73 m)	150 lb (68 kg)	Fr	Lansing Catholic	East Lansing, MI
F	15	Thomas Kithier	6 ft 8 in (2.03 m)	230 lb (104 kg)	So	Dakota HS	Clarkston, MI
G	1	Joshua Langford (injured) (C)	6 ft 5 in (1.96 m)	200 lb (91 kg)	Sr	Madison Academy	Huntsville, AL
G	3	Foster Loyer	6 ft 0 in (1.83 m)	175 lb (79 kg)	So	Clarkston HS	Clarkston, MI
F	34	Julius Marble II	6 ft 8 in (2.03 m)	225 lb (102 kg)	Fr	Jesuit HS	Dallas, TX
F	23	Xavier Tillman (C)	6 ft 8 in (2.03 m)	245 lb (111 kg)	Jr	Grand Rapids Christian HS	Grand Rapids, MI
G	14	Brock Washington (W)	6 ft 4 in (1.93 m)	200 lb (91 kg)	RS So	Southfield Christian School	Southfield, MI
G	2	Rocket Watts	6 ft 2 in (1.88 m)	185 lb (84 kg)	Fr	SPIRE Academy	Detroit, MI
G	5	Cassius Winston (C)	6 ft 1 in (1.85 m)	185 lb (84 kg)	Sr	UD Jesuit HS	Detroit, MI

Head coach

- Tom Izzo (Northern Michigan)

Assistant coach(es)

- Dwayne Stephens (Michigan State)
- Dane Fife (Indiana)
- Mike Garland (Northern Michigan)

Legend

- (C) Team captain
- (S) Suspended
- (I) Ineligible
- (W) Walk-on
- Injured
- Current redshirt

Roster

=== Depth chart ===
Pos.	Starting 5	Bench 1	Bench 2
C	Xavier Tillman	Thomas Kithier
PF	Malik Hall	Marcus Bingham Jr.	Julius Marble II
SF	Aaron Henry	Kyle Ahrens
SG	Rocket Watts	Gabe Brown
PG	Cassius Winston	Foster Loyer

== Schedule and results ==
The Big Ten announced MSU's conference opponents on April 17, 2019. MSU participated in the Champions Classic, the ACC–Big Ten Challenge, and the Maui Invitational Tournament. Additionally, the Spartans participated in the Gavitt Tip-Off Games for the first time, playing Big East opponent, Seton Hall. It was expected that the Spartans would take an exhibition tour of Spain in late summer, but the school announced on June 17 that there would be no trip.

Date time, TV	Rank^{#}	Opponent^{#}	Result	Record	High points	High rebounds	High assists	Site (attendance) city, state
Exhibition
October 29, 2019*; 7:00 p.m., BTN Plus	No. 1	Albion	W 85–50	–	19 – Tillman	11 – Kithier	9 – Winston	Breslin Center (14,797); East Lansing, MI
Regular season
November 5, 2019*; 9:30 p.m., ESPN	No. 1	vs. No. 2 Kentucky; Champions Classic	L 62–69	0–1	21 – Winston	8 – Tillman	4 – Winston	Madison Square Garden (19,812); New York, NY
November 10, 2019*; 7:00 p.m., BTN	No. 1	Binghamton	W 100–47	1–1	17 – Tied	8 – Tillman	11 – Winston	Breslin Center (14,797); East Lansing, MI
November 14, 2019*; 8:30 p.m., FS1	No. 3	at No. 12 Seton Hall; Gavitt Tipoff Games	W 76–73	2–1	21 – Winston	11 – Tillman	4 – Winston	Prudential Center (14,051); Newark, NJ
November 18, 2019*; 6:30 p.m., BTN	No. 3	Charleston Southern; Maui Invitational regional game	W 94–46	3–1	21 – Tillman	10 – Tillman	8 – Winston	Breslin Center (14,797); East Lansing, MI
November 25, 2019*; 5:00 pm, ESPN2	No. 3	vs. Virginia Tech; Maui Invitational quarterfinals	L 66–71	3–2	18 – Henry	14 – Tillman	3 – Tied	Lahaina Civic Center (2,400); Lahaina, HI
November 26, 2019*; 2:30 pm, ESPN2	No. 3	vs. Georgia; Maui Invitational consolation round	W 93–85	4–2	28 – Winston	11 – Tillman	8 – Winston	Lahaina Civic Center (2,400); Lahaina, HI
November 27, 2019*; 2:30 pm, ESPN2	No. 3	vs. UCLA; Maui Invitational 5th place game	W 75–62	5–2	20 – Winston	7 – Tillman	4 – Winston	Lahaina Civic Center (2,400); Lahaina, HI
December 3, 2019*; 9:30 p.m., ESPN	No. 11	No. 10 Duke; ACC–Big Ten Challenge	L 75–87	5–3	20 – Tillman	8 – Tied	7 – Winston	Breslin Center (14,797); East Lansing, MI
December 8, 2019; 7:00 p.m., BTN	No. 11	Rutgers	W 77–65	6–3 (1–0)	23 – Winston	10 – Tillman	7 – Winston	Breslin Center (14,797); East Lansing, MI
December 14, 2019*; 12:00 p.m., ESPN2	No. 16	vs. Oakland	W 72–49	7–3	10 – Henry	13 – Tillman	6 – Henry	Little Caesars Arena (18,145); Detroit, MI
December 18, 2019; 8:00 p.m., BTN	No. 15	at Northwestern	W 77–72	8–3 (2–0)	21 – Winston	10 – Tied	6 – Winston	Welsh–Ryan Arena (6,734); Evanston, IL
December 21, 2019*; 7:00 p.m., BTN	No. 15	Eastern Michigan	W 101–48	9–3	21 – Winston	9 – Henry	7 – Winston	Breslin Center (14,797); East Lansing, MI
December 29, 2019*; 8:00 p.m., BTN	No. 14	Western Michigan	W 95–62	10–3	16 – Loyer	11 – Tillman	6 – Tied	Breslin Center (14,797); East Lansing, MI
January 2, 2020; 8:00 p.m., FS1	No. 14	Illinois	W 76–56	11–3 (3–0)	21 – Winston	12 – Bingham	6 – Tied	Breslin Center (14,797); East Lansing, MI
January 5, 2020; 1:30 p.m., CBS	No. 14	No. 12 Michigan; Rivalry	W 87–69	12–3 (4–0)	32 – Winston	11 – Tillman	9 – Winston	Breslin Center (14,797); East Lansing, MI
January 9, 2020; 9:00 p.m., ESPN2	No. 8	Minnesota	W 74–58	13–3 (5–0)	27 – Winston	16 – Tillman	7 – Henry	Breslin Center (14,797); East Lansing, MI
January 12, 2020; 12:00 p.m., CBS	No. 8	at Purdue	L 42–71	13–4 (5–1)	10 – Winston	8 – Tillman	5 – Winston	Mackey Arena (14,804); West Lafayette, IN
January 17, 2020; 7:00 p.m., FS1	No. 15	Wisconsin	W 67–55	14–4 (6–1)	15 – Tillman	9 – Tillman	4 – Tied	Breslin Center (14,797); East Lansing, MI
January 23, 2020; 8:30 p.m., FS1	No. 11	at Indiana	L 63–67	14–5 (6–2)	17 – Winston	10 – Tillman	5 – Tied	Simon Skjodt Assembly Hall (17,222); Bloomington, IN
January 26, 2020; 3:00 p.m., FOX	No. 11	at Minnesota	W 70–52	15–5 (7–2)	18 – Winston	10 – Tillman	8 – Winston	Williams Arena (12,114); Minneapolis, MN
January 29, 2020; 6:30 p.m., BTN	No. 14	Northwestern	W 79–50	16–5 (8–2)	18 – Winston	8 – Tillman	4 – Tied	Breslin Center (14,797); East Lansing, MI
February 1, 2020; 1:00 p.m., FOX	No. 14	at Wisconsin	L 63–64	16–6 (8–3)	23 – Winston	14 – Tillman	5 – Tillman	Kohl Center (17,287); Madison, WI
February 4, 2020; 8:00 p.m., BTN	No. 16	No. 22 Penn State	L 70–75	16–7 (8–4)	25 – Winston	11 – Tillman	9 – Winston	Breslin Center (14,797); East Lansing, MI
February 8, 2020; 12:00 p.m., FOX	No. 16	at Michigan; Rivalry	L 68–77	16–8 (8–5)	20 – Winston	12 – Tillman	6 – Winston	Crisler Center (12,707); Ann Arbor, MI
February 11, 2020; 9:00 p.m., ESPN		at No. 22 Illinois	W 70–69	17–8 (9–5)	22 – Watts	11 – Tillman	3 – Tied	State Farm Center (15,544); Champaign, IL
February 15, 2020; 6:00 p.m., ESPN		No. 9 Maryland; ESPN College GameDay	L 60–67	17–9 (9–6)	18 – Tillman	11 – Tillman	5 – Winston	Breslin Center (14,797); East Lansing, MI
February 20, 2020; 8:30 p.m., FS1		at Nebraska	W 86–65	18–9 (10–6)	23 – Winston	11 – Tillman	6 – Winston	Pinnacle Bank Arena (15,838); Lincoln, NE
February 25, 2020; 7:00 p.m., ESPN2	No. 24	No. 18 Iowa	W 78–70	19–9 (11–6)	21 – Watts	6 – Tied	9 – Winston	Breslin Center (14,797); East Lansing, MI
February 29, 2020; 8:00 pm, ESPN	No. 24	at No. 9 Maryland; ESPN College GameDay	W 78–66	20–9 (12–6)	20 – Winston	12 – Tillman	6 – Tied	Xfinity Center (17,950); College Park, MD
March 3, 2020; 7:00 p.m., ESPN	No. 16	at No. 20 Penn State	W 79–71	21–9 (13–6)	23 – Tillman	15 – Tillman	7 – Winston	Bryce Jordan Center (13,437); State College, PA
March 8, 2020; 4:30 p.m., CBS	No. 16	No. 19 Ohio State	W 80–69	22–9 (14–6)	27 – Winston	9 – Tillman	6 – Winston	Breslin Center (14,797); East Lansing, MI
Big Ten tournament
Canceled
NCAA tournament
Canceled
*Non-conference game. ^{#}Rankings from AP Poll. (#) Tournament seedings in parentheses. All times are in Eastern Time.

== Player statistics ==
Individual player statistics (Final)
			Minutes		Scoring		Total FGs			3-point FGs			Free-Throws			Rebounds							
Player	GP	GS	Tot	Avg	Pts	Avg	FG	FGA	Pct	3FG	3FA	Pct	FT	FTA	Pct	Off	Def	Tot	Avg	A	Stl	Blk	TO
Ahrens, Kyle	27	1	355	13.1	96	3.6	31	78	.397	22	56	.393	12	18	.800	10	39	49	1.8	14	12	0	21
Bingham, Marcus	31	16	343	11.1	107	3.5	38	95	.400	5	28	.179	26	41	.634	31	80	111	3.6	12	7	42	14
Brown, Gabe	31	16	678	21.9	211	6.8	72	165	.436	31	97	.341	36	38	.947	27	84	111	3.6	16	8	11	16
Burke, Braden	8	0	12	1.5	2	0.3	1	1	1.000	0	0		0	0		0	0	0	0.0	0	0	1	0
George, Conner	14	0	50	3.6	15	1.1	5	16	.313	2	7	.286	3	6	.500	8	17	25	1.8	1	0	1	2
Hall, Malik	31	9	497	15.9	143	4.6	52	97	.536	7	21	.333	32	44	.717	38	77	115	3.7	38	10	10	22
Henry, Aaron	30	29	872	29.1	300	10.0	112	254	.441	31	90	.344	45	64	.703	31	106	137	4.6	86	25	17	61
Hoiberg, Jack	12	1	41	3.4	19	1.6	4	12	.333	1	4	.250	10	14	.714	1	2	3	0.3	12	2	0	3
Izzo, Steven	11	0	16	1.5	0	0.0	0	2	.000	0	0		0	0		0	4	4	0.4	1	1	0	1
Kithier, Thomas	29	5	362	12.5	89	3.1	41	61	.672	1	2	.500	6	13	.462	41	51	92	3.2	22	2	6	12
Loyer, Foster	31	1	233	7.5	90	2.9	26	58	.448	18	40	.450	20	22	.909	1	15	16	0.5	29	5	0	14
Marble, Julius	27	0	149	5.5	47	1.7	18	32	.563	0	1	.000	11	18	.611	12	29	41	1.5	3	1	2	7
Tillman, Xavier	31	31	995	32.1	425	13.7	165	300	.550	13	50	.260	82	123	.667	83	237	320	10.3	93	37	65	61
Washington, Brock	8	0	19	2.4	7	0.9	2	10	.200	1	5	.200	2	2	1.000	3	4	7	0.9	1	0	0	4
Watts, Rocket	27	16	602	22.3	244	9.0	93	239	.389	34	121	.281	24	30	.800	4	59	63	2.3	45	13	0	38
Winston, Cassius	30	30	980	32.7	558	18.6	185	413	.448	73	169	.432	115	135	.852	6	69	75	2.5	176	36	1	96
Team																46	42	88	2.9				
Total	31		6200		2353	75.9	845	1833	.461	239	687	.348	424	565	.750	344	914	1258	40.6	549	159	156	389
Opponents	31		6200		2007	64.7	709	1873	.379	203	707	.287	386	549	.703	321	706	1027	33.1	395	186	105	341

Legend
GP	Games played	GS	Games started	Avg	Average per game
FG	Field-goals made	FGA	Field-goal attempts	Off	Offensive rebounds
Def	Defensive rebounds	A	Assists	TO	Turnovers
Blk	Blocks	Stl	Steals

== Rankings ==
Ranking movements Legend: ██ Increase in ranking ██ Decrease in ranking RV = Received votes т = Tied with team above or below ( ) = First-place votes
	Week																			
Poll	Pre	1	2	3	4	5	6	7	8	9	10	11	12	13	14	15	16	17	18	Final
AP	1 (60)	3	3 (4)	3 (4)	11	16	15	14	14	8	15	11	14	16	RV	RV	24	16	9	9
Coaches	1 (30)	1 (30)*	3 (4)	3 (1)	12	15	18	16	16	8	14	9	14	14	25	25	24т	17	12	12

*Coaches did not release a week 2 poll

== Awards and honors ==
=== In-season awards ===
Name	Award	Date
Malik Hall	Big Ten Freshman of the Week	November 18, 2019
Cassius Winston	Big Ten Player of the Week	January 6, 2020
Cassius Winston	Big Ten Player of the Week	March 2, 2020
Cassius Winston	Naismith National Player of the Week	January 6, 2020

=== Post-season awards ===
==== Xavier Tillman ====
- Big Ten Defensive Player of the Year
- All-Big Ten Second Team
- All-Big Ten Defensive Team
- Academic All-American Second Team
- USBWA All-District V Team

==== Rocket Watts ====
- All-Big Ten Freshman Team

==== Cassius Winston ====
- All-Big Ten First Team (unanimous coaches)
- AP All-American Second Team
- Sporting News All-American Second Team
- USBWA All-American Second Team
- NABC All-American Second Team
- Consensus All-American Second Team
- Wooden Award Finalist
- USBWA All-District V Team
