= Northwestern Wildcats men's basketball statistical leaders =

The Northwestern Wildcats men's basketball statistical leaders are individual statistical leaders of the Northwestern Wildcats men's basketball program in various categories, including points, three-pointers, assists, blocks, rebounds, and steals. Within those areas, the lists identify single-game, single-season, and career leaders. The Wildcats represent Northwestern University in the NCAA's Big Ten Conference.

Northwestern began competing in intercollegiate basketball in 1904. However, the school's record book does not generally list records from before the 1950s, as records from before this period are often incomplete and inconsistent. Since scoring was much lower in this era, and teams played much fewer games during a typical season, it is likely that few or no players from this era would appear on these lists anyway.

The NCAA did not officially record assists as a stat until the 1983–84 season, and blocks and steals until the 1985–86 season, but Northwestern's record books includes players in these stats before these seasons. These lists are updated through the most recent game of the 2022–23 season.

== Scoring ==
Career
| Rk | Player | Points | Seasons |
|---|---|---|---|
| 1 | Boo Buie | 2,187 | 2019–20 2020–21 2021–22 2022–23 2023–24 |
| 2 | John Shurna | 2,038 | 2008–09 2009–10 2010–11 2011–12 |
| 3 | Drew Crawford | 1,920 | 2009–10 2010–11 2011–12 2012–13 2013–14 |
| 4 | Billy McKinney | 1,900 | 1973–74 1974–75 1975–76 1976–77 |
| 5 | Evan Eschmeyer | 1,805 | 1995–96 1996–97 1997–98 1998–99 |
| 6 | Nick Martinelli | 1,787 | 2022–23 2023–24 2024–25 2025–26 |
| 7 | Michael Thompson | 1,689 | 2007–08 2008–09 2009–10 2010–11 |
| 8 | Bryant McIntosh | 1,683 | 2014–15 2015–16 2016–17 2017–18 |
| 9 | Jim Stack | 1,583 | 1979–80 1980–81 1981–82 1982–83 |
| 10 | Vedran Vukusic | 1,581 | 2001–02 2003–04 2004–05 2005–06 |

Season
| Rk | Player | Points | Season |
|---|---|---|---|
| 1 | Nick Martinelli | 759 | 2025–26 |
| 2 | Nick Martinelli | 676 | 2024–25 |
| 3 | John Shurna | 661 | 2011–12 |
| 4 | Boo Buie | 646 | 2023–24 |
| 5 | John Shurna | 619 | 2009–10 |
| 6 | Boo Buie | 588 | 2022–23 |
| 7 | Evan Eschmeyer | 585 | 1997–98 |
| 8 | Dale Kelley | 582 | 1969–70 |
| 9 | Evan Eschmeyer | 568 | 1998–99 |
| 10 | Michael Thompson | 553 | 2010–11 |

Single game
| Rk | Player | Points | Season | Opponent |
|---|---|---|---|---|
| 1 | Rich Falk | 49 | 1963–64 | Iowa |
| 2 | Rick Lopossa | 40 | 1963–64 | Illinois |
| | Joe Ruklick | 40 | 1957–58 | Illinois |
| 4 | Geno Carlisle | 39 | 1995–96 | Wisconsin |
| | Dale Kelley | 39 | 1969–70 | Wisconsin |
| 6 | Jim Burns | 38 | 1965–66 | Michigan |
| | Frank Ehmann | 38 | 1954–55 | Michigan |
| 8 | John Shurna | 37 | 2011–12 | LSU |
| | Kevin Coble | 37 | 2007–08 | Indiana |
| | Evan Eschmeyer | 37 | 1997–98 | Penn State |
| | Tony Allen | 37 | 1977–78 | UNLV |
| | Billy McKinney | 37 | 1974–75 | Notre Dame |
| | Jim Burns | 37 | 1965–66 | Purdue |
| | Rich Falk | 37 | 1963–64 | Michigan State |

== Rebounds ==
Career
| Rk | Player | Rebounds | Seasons |
|---|---|---|---|
| 1 | Evan Eschmeyer | 995 | 1995–96 1996–97 1997–98 1998–99 |
| 2 | Kevin Rankin | 885 | 1990–91 1991–92 1992–93 1993–94 |
| 3 | Joe Ruklick | 868 | 1956–57 1957–58 1958–59 |
| 4 | Jim Pitts | 800 | 1963–64 1964–65 1965–66 |
| 5 | Dererk Pardon | 784 | 2015–16 2016–17 2017–18 2018–19 |
| 6 | Don Adams | 773 | 1967–68 1968–69 1969–70 |
| 7 | Drew Crawford | 713 | 2009–10 2010–11 2011–12 2012–13 2013–14 |
| 8 | Shon Morris | 712 | 1984–85 1985–86 1986–87 1987–88 |
| 9 | Phil Warren | 665 | 1956–57 1957–58 1958–59 |
| 10 | Alexandru Olah | 663 | 2012–13 2013–14 2014–15 2015–16 |

Season
| Rk | Player | Rebounds | Season |
|---|---|---|---|
| 1 | Jim Pitts | 321 | 1965–66 |
| 2 | Joe Ruklick | 306 | 1957–58 |
| 3 | Evan Eschmeyer | 292 | 1998–99 |
| 4 | Evan Eschmeyer | 290 | 1997–98 |
| 5 | Joe Ruklick | 287 | 1958–59 |
| 6 | Joe Ruklick | 275 | 1956–57 |
| 7 | Don Adams | 268 | 1968–69 |
| | Jim Pitts | 268 | 1964–65 |
| 9 | Don Adams | 256 | 1967–68 |
| 10 | Brooks Barnhizer | 255 | 2023–24 |

Single game
| Rk | Player | Rebounds | Season | Opponent |
|---|---|---|---|---|
| 1 | Jim Pitts | 29 | 1964–65 | Indiana |
| 2 | Jim Pitts | 26 | 1965–66 | Indiana |
| 3 | Chuck Brandt | 24 | 1959–60 | Illinois |
| 4 | Jim Pitts | 23 | 1963–64 | Notre Dame |
| | Bill Schulz | 23 | 1955–56 | Iowa |
| 6 | Dererk Pardon | 22 | 2016–17 | Nebraska |
| | Jim Pitts | 22 | 1965–66 | Ohio State |
| | Joe Ruklick | 22 | 1958–59 | Iowa |
| 9 | Evan Eschmeyer | 21 | 1998–99 | Penn State |
| | Joe Ruklick | 21 | 1956–57 | Western Michigan |

== Assists ==
Career
| Rk | Player | Assists | Seasons |
|---|---|---|---|
| 1 | Bryant McIntosh | 700 | 2014–15 2015–16 2016–17 2017–18 |
| 2 | Boo Buie | 618 | 2019–20 2020–21 2021–22 2022–23 2023–24 |
| 3 | Michael Thompson | 528 | 2007–08 2008–09 2009–10 2010–11 |
| 4 | Pat Baldwin | 452 | 1990–91 1991–92 1992–93 1993–94 |
| 5 | Shawn Watts | 379 | 1983–84 1984–85 1985–86 1986–87 |
| 6 | Michael Jenkins | 342 | 1979–80 1980–81 1981–82 1982–83 |
| 7 | Tim Doyle | 341 | 2004–05 2005–06 2006–07 |
| 8 | Dave Sobolewski | 334 | 2011–12 2012–13 2013–14 2014–15 |
| 9 | Craig Moore | 308 | 2005–06 2006–07 2007–08 2008–09 |
| 10 | John Shurna | 295 | 2008–09 2009–10 2010–11 2011–12 |

Season
| Rk | Player | Assists | Season |
|---|---|---|---|
| 1 | Bryant McIntosh | 213 | 2015–16 |
| 2 | Bryant McIntosh | 188 | 2016–17 |
| 3 | Boo Buie | 171 | 2023–24 |
| | Jayden Reid | 171 | 2025–26 |
| 5 | Tim Doyle | 157 | 2006–07 |
| 6 | Pat Baldwin | 154 | 1993–94 |
| | Boo Buie | 154 | 2022–23 |
| 8 | Bryant McIntosh | 150 | 2014–15 |
| 9 | Bryant McIntosh | 149 | 2017–18 |
| 10 | Michael Thompson | 147 | 2010–11 |

Single game
| Rk | Player | Assists | Season | Opponent |
|---|---|---|---|---|
| 1 | Bryant McIntosh | 16 | 2017–18 | Minnesota |
| 2 | Pat Baldwin | 14 | 1992–93 | Youngstown State |
| 3 | Jake West | 13 | 2025–26 | Penn State |
| | Bryant McIntosh | 13 | 2015–16 | Rutgers |
| | Terry Gamber | 13 | 1966–67 | Rhode Island |
| 6 | Jake West | 12 | 2026–27 | Binghamton |
| | Jerry Marifke | 12 | 1976–77 | Wisconsin |
| 8 | Bryant McIntosh | 11 | 2015–16 | Minnesota |
| 9 | Boo Buie | 10 | 2023–24 | Michigan State |
| | Bryant McIntosh | 10 | 2016–17 | Iowa |
| | Bryant McIntosh | 10 | 2015–16 | Penn State |
| | Bryant McIntosh | 10 | 2015–16 | Sacred Heart |
| | Michael Thompson | 10 | 2007–08 | Penn State |
| | Ben Johnson | 10 | 2000–01 | Penn State |
| | Evan Eschmeyer | 10 | 1998–99 | Indiana |
| | Pat Baldwin | 10 | 1992–93 | Holy Cross |
| | Rob Ross | 10 | 1989–90 | Wisconsin |

== Steals ==
Career
| Rk | Player | Steals | Seasons |
|---|---|---|---|
| 1 | Pat Baldwin | 272 | 1990–91 1991–92 1992–93 1993–94 |
| 2 | Jitim Young | 215 | 2000–01 2001–02 2002–03 2003–04 |
| 3 | Mohamed Hachad | 167 | 2002–03 2003–04 2004–05 2005–06 |
| 4 | Shawn Watts | 161 | 1983–84 1984–85 1985–86 1986–87 |
| 5 | Chase Audige | 160 | 2020–21 2021–22 2022–23 |
| 6 | Michael Thompson | 159 | 2007–08 2008–09 2009–10 2010–11 |
| | Ty Berry | 159 | 2020–21 2021–22 2022–23 2023–24 2024–25 |
| 8 | Art Aaron | 145 | 1980–81 1981–82 1982–83 1983–84 |
| 9 | Boo Buie | 143 | 2019–20 2020–21 2021–22 2022–23 2023–24 |
| 10 | Craig Moore | 141 | 2005–06 2006–07 2007–08 2008–09 |

Season
| Rk | Player | Steals | Season |
|---|---|---|---|
| 1 | Pat Baldwin | 90 | 1990–91 |
| 2 | Chase Audige | 81 | 2022–23 |
| 3 | Pat Baldwin | 74 | 1992–93 |
| 4 | Art Aaron | 67 | 1983–84 |
| 5 | Jitim Young | 66 | 2003–04 |
| 6 | Brooks Barnhizer | 61 | 2023–24 |
| 7 | Pat Baldwin | 59 | 1993–94 |
| 8 | Jeremy Nash | 58 | 2009–10 |
| 9 | Mohamed Hachad | 57 | 2003–04 |
| 10 | Craig Moore | 55 | 2007–08 |
| | Jitim Young | 55 | 2001–02 |
| | Shawn Watts | 55 | 1986–87 |

Single game
| Rk | Player | Steals | Season | Opponent |
|---|---|---|---|---|
| 1 | Pat Baldwin | 9 | 1990–91 | Oakland |
| 2 | Jitim Young | 8 | 2003–04 | Penn State |
| | Pat Baldwin | 8 | 1991–92 | Vanderbilt |
| | Shawn Watts | 8 | 1986–87 | Rollins |
| 5 | Jeremy Nash | 7 | 2008–09 | Chicago State |
| | Craig Moore | 7 | 2007–08 | Savannah State |
| | Mike Capocci | 7 | 2007–08 | Benedictine (Illinois) |
| | Pat Baldwin | 7 | 1992–93 | Holy Cross |
| | Pat Baldwin | 7 | 1992–93 | Purdue |
| | Pat Baldwin | 7 | 1990–91 | Loyola |
| | Pat Baldwin | 7 | 1990–91 | Illinois |
| | Shawn Watts | 7 | 1986–87 | Marquette |

== Blocks ==
Career
| Rk | Player | Blocks | Seasons |
|---|---|---|---|
| 1 | Alexandru Olah | 181 | 2012–13 2013–14 2014–15 2015–16 |
| 2 | Dererk Pardon | 148 | 2015–16 2016–17 2017–18 2018–19 |
| 3 | John Shurna | 136 | 2008–09 2009–10 2010–11 2011–12 |
| 4 | Kevin Rankin | 133 | 1990–91 1991–92 1992–93 1993–94 |
| 5 | Evan Eschmeyer | 132 | 1995–96 1996–97 1997–98 1998–99 |
| 6 | Matthew Nicholson | 129 | 2020–21 2021–22 2022–23 2023–24 2024–25 |
| 7 | Jim Pitts | 123 | 1963–64 1964–65 1965–66 |
| 8 | Tavaras Hardy | 101 | 1998–99 1999–00 2000–01 2001–02 |
| 9 | Drew Crawford | 98 | 2009–10 2010–11 2011–12 2012–13 2013–14 |
| 10 | Gavin Skelly | 91 | 2014–15 2015–16 2016–17 2017–18 |

Season
| Rk | Player | Blocks | Season |
|---|---|---|---|
| 1 | Jim Pitts | 123 | 1965–66 |
| 2 | Alexandru Olah | 59 | 2014–15 |
| 3 | Alexandru Olah | 58 | 2013–14 |
| 4 | Dererk Pardon | 56 | 2017–18 |
| 5 | John Shurna | 55 | 2011–12 |
| 6 | Dererk Pardon | 50 | 2016–17 |
| 7 | Evan Eschmeyer | 48 | 1998–99 |
| 8 | Kevin Rankin | 45 | 1991–92 |
| | Matthew Nicholson | 45 | 2024–25 |
| 10 | Gavin Skelly | 44 | 2016–17 |

Single game
| Rk | Player | Blocks | Season | Opponent |
|---|---|---|---|---|
| 1 | Jim Pitts | 10 | 1965–66 | Purdue |
| 2 | Dererk Pardon | 8 | 2016–17 | Rutgers |
| 3 | Aaron Jennings | 7 | 2002–03 | New Hampshire |
| | Evan Eschmeyer | 7 | 1998–99 | Purdue |
| | Jim Wallace | 7 | 1975–76 | Ohio |
| 6 | Dererk Pardon | 6 | 2017–18 | Minnesota |
| | Dererk Pardon | 6 | 2016–17 | Notre Dame |
| | Alexandru Olah | 6 | 2015–16 | New Orleans |
| | Alexandru Olah | 6 | 2013–14 | Indiana |
| | Kevin Rankin | 6 | 1991–92 | Vanderbilt |
| | Jim Pitts | 6 | 1965–66 | Wisconsin |
| | Evan Eschmeyer | 6 | 1996–97 | Seton Hall |
