= Jake West (basketball) =

American basketball player (born 2006)

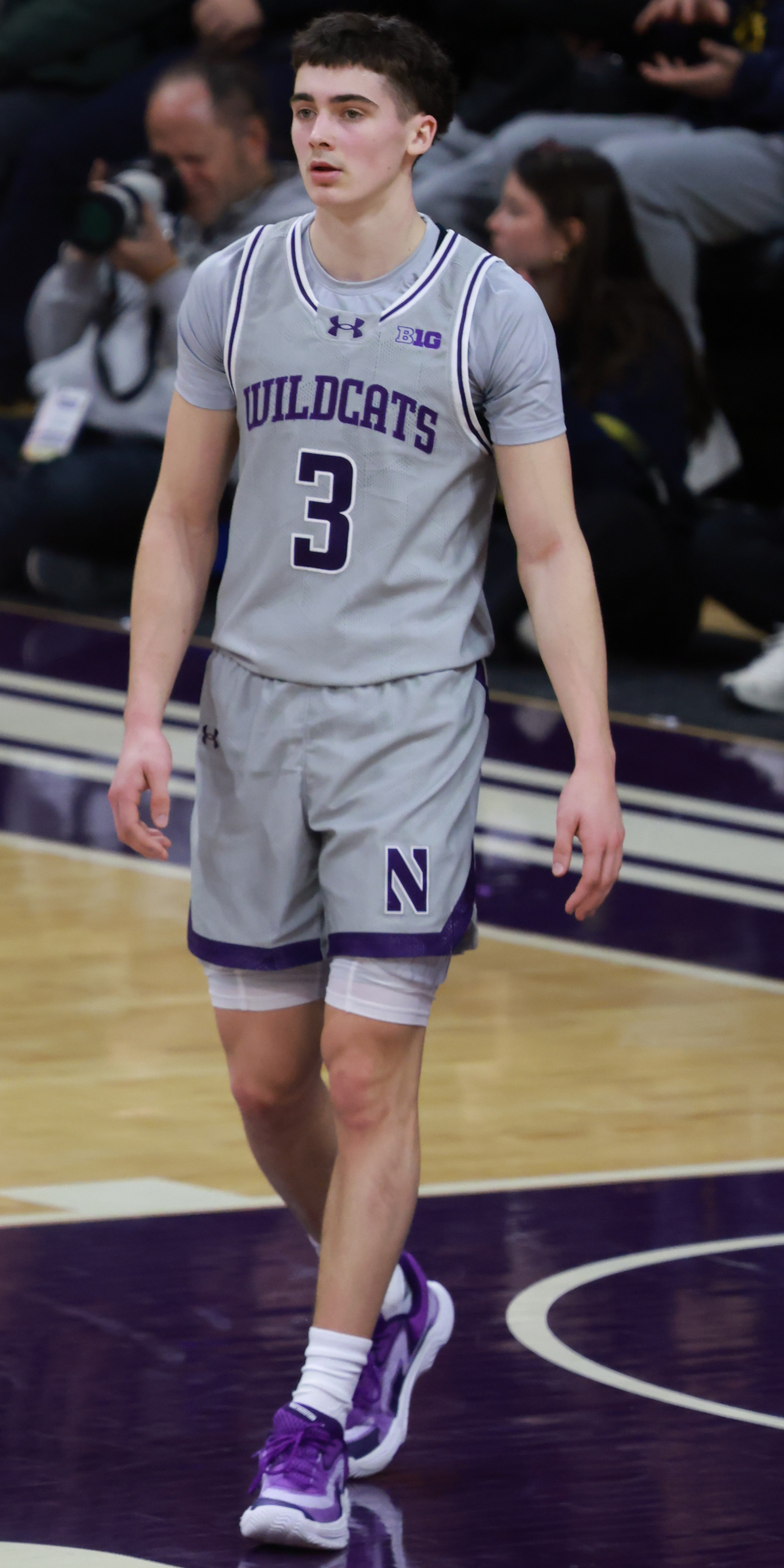
- West for the 2025–26 Northwestern Wildcats
- Basketball career

No. 3 – Northwestern Wildcats
- Position: Point guard
- League: Big Ten Conference

Personal information
- Born: May 17, 2006 (age 20)
- Listed height: 6 ft 3 in (1.91 m)
- Listed weight: 180 lb (82 kg)

Career information
- High school: Plymouth-Whitemarsh (Plymouth Meeting, Pennsylvania); Archbishop Carroll (Radnor, Pennsylvania); Penn Charter (Philadelphia, Pennsylvania)
- College: Northwestern (2025–present)

Career highlights
- Mr. Pennsylvania Basketball (2025)

Instagram information
- Page: jakewestt3
- Followers: 251 thousand

TikTok information
- Page: jakewestt
- Followers: 1.6 million
- Last updated: May 6, 2026

Jake West (born May 17, 2006) is an American college basketball player who plays for the Northwestern Wildcats of the Big Ten Conference (B1G) and is a social media influencer. He was voted as the 2025 Mr. Pennsylvania Basketball and invited to be a Ballislife All-American Game participant. He joined TikTok in 2021 and has had over 1 million followers on the platform since 2023.

He became a starter for Northwestern midway through his freshman season. His collegiate highlights include setting the school freshman single-game assists record (13) and tying the school freshman single-game Big Ten Tournament points record (18). He also established the school freshman single-postseason Big Ten Tournament assists record (10). As a sophomore, he became the first underclass team captain since 1991–92.

== Early life ==
Jake West was born to Shannon and Matt West and has a brother named Luke who is four years his junior. Since the age of 5, he tried various sports including soccer, baseball, football and lacrosse, but began to focus on basketball in middle school where he competed for the school as well as on the AAU circuit. At the time, he worked with basketball trainers in the offseason. During his eighth grade season, he endured a skull fracture (which sidelined him for 2 months) and followed that up with an elbow-induced nosebleed that also sidelined him. During his freshman season at Plymouth-Whitemarsh High School, which coincided with the COVID-19 pandemic, he stood at 5 ft 6 in (1.68 m). Then, he hit a 5-inch (12.7 cm) growth spurt before two seasons at Archbishop John Carroll High School. Then, he transferred for his final two years at William Penn Charter School where he was listed at 6 ft 3 in (1.91 m).

West first created his TikTok account in 2021. He had accumulated over a million followers on TikTok by August 2023. After his sophomore season, he was going to transfer to the George School for his junior season. However, he was recruited to the William Penn Charter School by head coach Brandon Williams where he became teammates with Matt Gilhool, an LSU commit and Kai Shinholster, a Minnesota commit. As of August 2023, he had offers from Marist, Butler, George Mason, Maryland, and Rhode Island. In February 2024, despite losing its first two league games of the season, Penn Charter became the first team to win the Inter-Academic League (of the Pennsylvania Independent Schools Athletic Association, AKA PAISAA) Championship with three losses since 1969 with West leading the team with 22 points in the championship game against.Episcopal Academy. West was a 2024 non-PIAA 2nd team All-state selection.

Northwestern's recruiting interest in West ebbed and flowed during the summer of 2024, but they visited him in September 2024. West visited Northwestern on October 4 and 5. Head coach Chris Collins and assistant coach Bryant McIntosh returned the visit on October 9 to collect his commitment, and he publicly announce his verbal commitment on October 15, 2024. At the time of his public commitment, On3 ranked him 131st overall, 18th at point guard and number 3 from Pennsylvania in the 2025 class. Two weeks later, he was the sixth best recruit in Pennsylvania and had 1.5 million TikTok followers. He had narrowed his offers down to a final five of Charlotte, Coastal Carolina, Northwestern, VCU and Florida.

West led Penn Charter to an undefeated (10–0) 2024–25 Inter-Academic League record and was named the league MVP. He then won the 2025 Mr. Pennsylvania Basketball. West was a Pennsylvania Sports Writers 2025 All-State selection for non-PIAA schools, but their non-PIAA player of the year was K.J. Cochran. Kevair Kennedy was the 2024-25 Pennsylvania MaxPreps Player of the Year., while Jordan Ellerbee was the 2024-25 Pennsylvania Gatorade Player of the Year. West was a participant in the 2025 Ballislife All-American Game, and as an athlete with a social media following, he was approached with an NIL deal by Passes Inc..

== College career ==
=== Freshman season (2025–26) ===
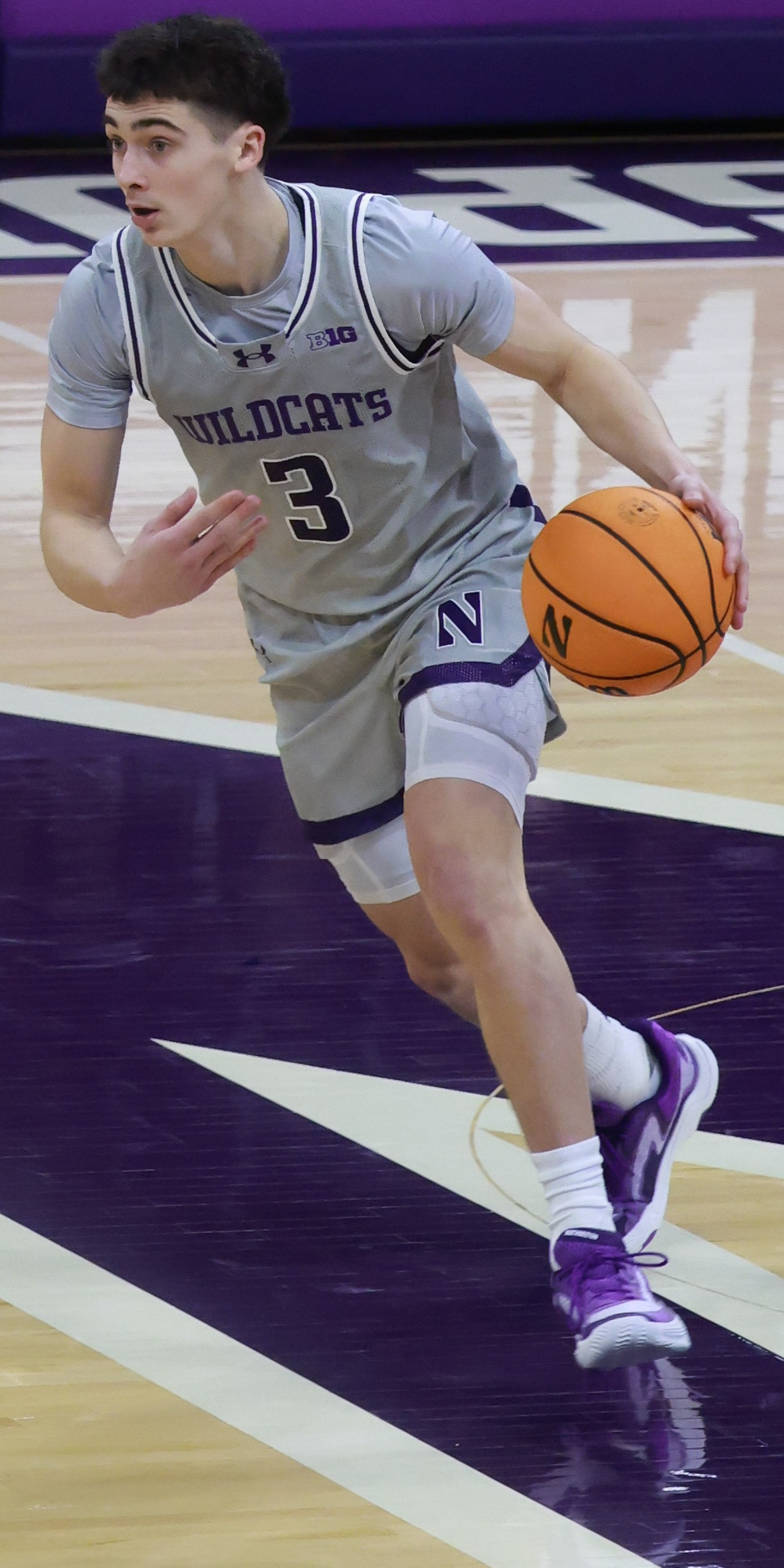
West in 2026

West began his career at Northwestern playing 16 games off the bench, and he averaged 2.8 points and 1.8 assists. He moved into the starting lineup on January 14, 2026, against number 13-ranked Illinois. The two previous freshman to start for Northwestern at point guard had been Boo Buie and McIntosh. Through his first 12 career starts, he held the highest assists:turnover ratio in school history (3.16). He started in his final 17 appearances for Northwestern, averaging 7.4 points and 3.9 assists with a 36.8% three point field goal percentage in those games. In his fifth career start (against Penn State on January 29) he posted 13 assists. West is the fourth Wildcat to achieve 13 single-game assists. He is the first Northwestern freshman to achieve this single-game total. The total tied him for third all-time at Northwestern and was the most single-game assists by a Big Ten first-year in a conference game since Tony Carr posted 14 on February 1, 2017, for the 2016–17 Nittany Lions against Indiana. In February of West's freshman season, coach Collins noted that he did not realize that West was an influencer until Collins's 18-year-old daughter told him.

During the 2026 Big Ten tournament, West tied his career high with 18 points to help Northwestern defeat the 2025–26 Hoosiers and achieve its 7th consecutive victory against Indiana. His 14 first half points kept the halftime deficit to one point. The last time Northwestern had beaten Indiana 5 times in a row had been 1915. West's 18 points tied a school freshman Big Ten men's basketball tournament single-game record set by T. J. Parker in the 2003 Big Ten tournament. His single-postseason Big Ten tournament assist total of 10 was also a school freshman record, while his 28 single-postseason Big Ten tournament point total of 28 was second in school history among freshman.

For the season, he averaged 5.3 points and 2.8 assists across 33 games, but his role increased through the season. He averaged more points each successive month of the season. West's 2.8 assists ranked 4th among 2025–26 Big Ten freshmen and was the most by a Northwestern freshman since McIntosh (4.7) for the 2014–15 Wildcats.

After the 2025–26 Wildcats team finished the 2025–26 season a total of 8 Northwestern players entered the NCAA transfer portal, including 3 of the 5 players in West's 2025 entering class. Jayden Reid, who had been the primary point guard with 5.0 assists per game, transferred to Memphis via the portal. Accounting for players out of eligibility, this left Northwestern with 3 holdovers who did not enter the transfer portal, including West who is considered a cornerstone of the program.

=== Sophomore season (2026–27) ===
West, who became the first underclass Wildcat basketball captain since Pat Baldwin served the the 1991–92 Wildcats, began the season with 20 points and 12 assists in the November 2 opener against Binghamton, joining McIntosh as the only Wildcats with 20+ points and 10+ assists in a game in the last 20 season. West again improved his career-high point total with 23 on November 6 against Stony Brook, becoming the first Wildcat to open the season with back-to-back 20+ scoring efforts since Drew Crawford in 2010.

== Scouting report ==
Although freshman-year West came with upside potential, he had defensive downside because of his size at only 180 pounds (81.6 kg), especially against physical guards who posted big scoring nights against him. E.g., when West contributed over 30 minutes off the bench against Rutgers on January 11, Tariq Francis scored 30 points off the bench in a 77–75 overtime loss. Also, when West posted his career-high 18-point performance against Iowa on February 8, Bennett Stirtz took advantage of West for a career-high 36 points.

== See also ==
- Northwestern Wildcats men's basketball statistical leaders
