= Nick Martinelli (basketball) =

American basketball player (born 2004)

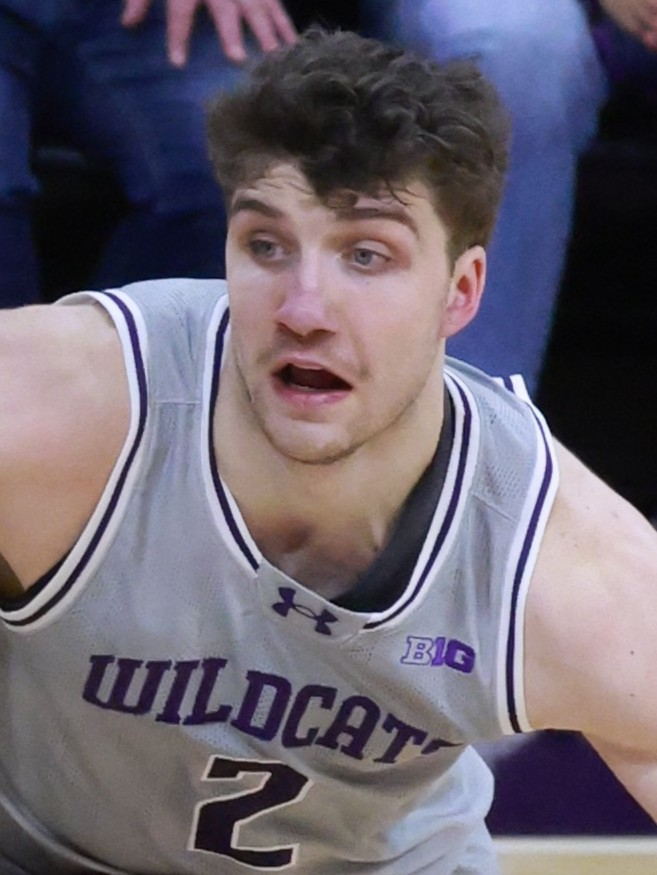
- Martinelli for the 2025–26 Northwestern Wildcats

No. 12 – Los Angeles Clippers
- Position: Small forward
- League: NBA

Personal information
- Born: April 20, 2004 (age 22) Glenview, Illinois, U.S
- Listed height: 6 ft 7 in (2.01 m)
- Listed weight: 220 lb (100 kg)

Career information
- High school: Glenbrook South (Glenview, Illinois)
- College: Northwestern (2022–2026)
- NBA draft: 2026: 2nd round, 55th overall pick
- Drafted by: New York Knicks
- Playing career: 2026–present

Career history
- 2026–present: Los Angeles Clippers
- 2026–present: →San Diego Clippers

Career highlights
- 2× Second-team All-Big Ten (2025, 2026); 2× First-team Academic All-American (2025, 2026)
- Stats at NBA.com
- Stats at Basketball Reference

Nicholas Joseph Martinelli (born April 20, 2004) is an American basketball player for the Los Angeles Clippers of the National Basketball Association (NBA), on a two-way contract with the San Diego Clippers of the NBA G League. He played college basketball for the Northwestern Wildcats of the Big Ten Conference.

Martinelli was a two-time second-team All-Big Ten honoree by the Big Ten Conference coaches and media, 2-time first-team Academic All-America selection, and a two-time Big Ten scoring champion. He also earned Associated Press 1st-team All-Big Ten recognition in 2026. He was also a member of the only Northwestern teams to earn back-to-back NCAA Division I men's basketball tournament invitations. He set the Northwestern single-season scoring record. At Glenbrook South High School, he was a two-time Associated Press All-State honoree (2021 2nd-team, 2022 1st-team).

== High school career ==
Martinelli's parents are named Jim and Carolyn. The Martinellis had a basketball hoop in their driveway. Nick started attending Northwestern basketball camps in fifth or sixth grade and played against his older brothers. Martinelli attended Glenbrook South High School in Glenview, Illinois. He is the younger brother of All-state player and Illinois High School Association record book achiever Dominic Martinelli. Oldest brother Jimmy, who was a Glenbrook South team captain, was a good player on sub-.500 teams at the school. He started for NYU from 2016 through 2020. Nick preferred American football and baseball to basketball when he was younger. He was mentioned in the Chicago Tribune in 2017 as a member of the 41-8-1 13U Glenview Blaze team which won the Midwest Suburban Baseball League's (MSBL) and was the regular season champion of the MSBL's top conference.

Martinelli had endured years of Glenbrook South mediocrity while cheering on his older brothers Jimmy who graduated in 2016 and Dom who was in the class of 2020. He even joined the varsity team as a sophomore and played with Dom. Thus, Nick had an 86-game varsity career. Prior to the 2018-19 season (Nick's freshman year) Glenbrook South had had only 1 10-win season in the prior 4 and one 15-win season since 2006. That year, Dom helped Glenbrook South turn around a 9-19 record from the previous season (and back-to-back 9-win seasons) into a 24-win season and an IHSA Class 4A regional championship. Nick played center in high school.

One of his earliest moments in the basketball spotlight came as a sophomore in a February 21, 2020, overtime game against Evanston Township High School, when he was fouled on a game-tying three point shot buzzer beater attempt. After making the first two and enduring a time-out, he missed the final free throw. This opened the door for Evanston to have a share of the Central Suburban League South division. The teams split the season series, and both teams finished with 9–1 division records. Glenbrook South moved to a 29–4 record with a 65–49 win against Maine West High School in the Class 4A Regional championship on March 6, 2020. Glenbrook South lost to Evanston 62–57 in the Class 4A sectional against Evanston to finish 29–5.

His 2020–21 junior season was truncated by a second wave of COVID-19 that delayed the IHSA Winter Sports from November to February. Glenbrook South opened its season on February 3. As a junior, he averaged 21.8 points and 5.9 rebounds per game. On February 20, Glenbrook South set a school record with its 18th consecutive home win as Martinelli posted a career-high 34 points against New Trier High School. He was named as a 2021 Associated Press Class 4A Second-Team All-State selection and a first team Class 4A all-state Illinois Basketball Coaches Association selection after leading Glenbrook South to a 16–2 record. Following the season, he received offers from Valparaiso, IUPUI, Lehigh, Rice, Belmont, Toledo, Wisconsin-Milwaukee, and Navy by July 1. On July 4, he made a verbal commitment to Elon in North Carolina.

Martinelli signed his National Letter of Intent on November 10 along with a slew of Glenbrook NCAA Division I and NCAA Division II athletes on the early signing date. Glenbrook South's 2021–22 season included victories over three Chicago Public High School League basketball powers (Morgan Park High School, Simeon Career Academy and Curie Metropolitan High School). The Simeon 57–54 January 22, 2022 victory was especially surprising as Martinelli posted a 21 point/11 rebound double-double as well as key assists and a blocked shot in the fourth quarter against the higher ranked team. On March 4, 2022, Martinelli led Glenbrook South to its first sectional championship in the school's 60-year history with a 55–52 victory over New Trier on Glenbrook South's home court. The team lost the subsequent Class 4A supersectional loss to Barrington High School to finish with a 33–3 record, leaving them one victory shy of the school's first trip to the state final four weekend. As a senior, he averaged 22.8 points per game, finishing his high school career with 1,331 total points. This total ranked him 3rd (behind Dom at 2,059 and 1,450 by Brad Niemann) in school history just 57 points ahead of classmate Cooper Noard, the team's point guard. He was named to the 2022 Associated Press Class 4A First-Team All-State along with Braden Huff, Owen Freeman, Dai Dai Ames and AJ Casey. Martinelli finished fourth in the 2022 Illinois Mr. Basketball voting (Dom had finished 6th in 2020) behind winner Huff, Jaden Schutt and Ty Rodgers.

Martinelli originally committed to Elon University to play under head coach Mike Schrage. After Schrage resigned as head coach at Elon, Martinelli decommitted from the Phoenix, citing both Shrage's April 5 resignation and Andrew Dakich's March 30 departure. After decommitting he picked up at least ten scholarship offers and held serious conversations with Xavier, and Utah. Due to the familiarity of Northwestern basketball whose players he often participated in pick-up games with and whose coaches had seen dozens of his games as a deciding factor, the three-star recruit committed to play college basketball at Northwestern University. Northwestern head basketball coach Chris Collins had been 1992 Illinois Mr. Basketball at nearby rival Glenbrook North High School. Assistant coach Brian James was also a Glenbrook North alumnus.

== College career ==
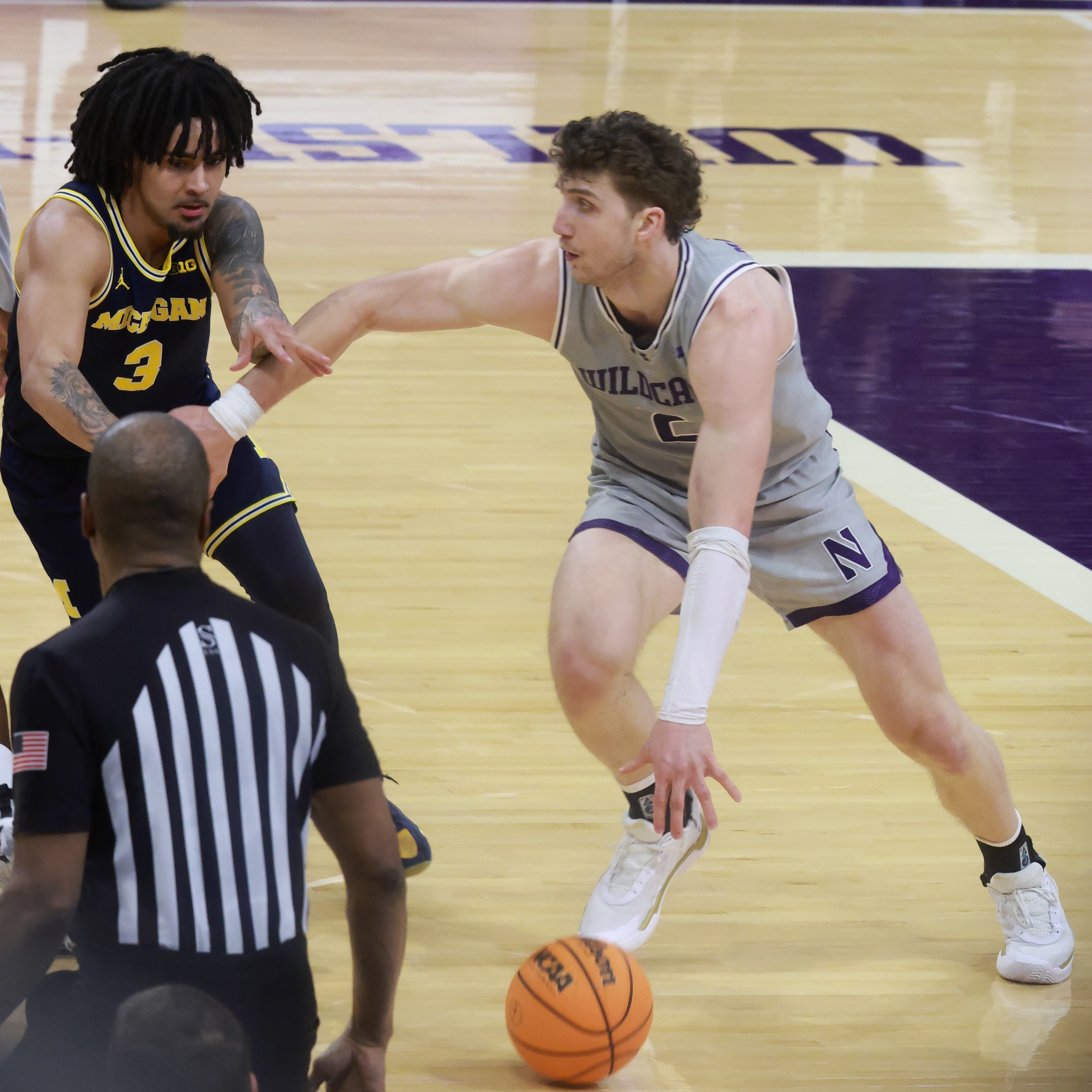
Martinelli attacking Elliot Cadeau in 2026

Martinelli played sparingly as a freshman, but he led all freshmen in scoring (2.6 points per game) and minutes. His 9 points on 3–3 three point shooting against Iowa on January 31, 2023, was his season high. He appeared in 20 games, including the final 17. Julian Roper II injured his ankle and missed most of the 2nd half of the season, as Martinelli earned minutes. The 2016–17 Wildcats had been the first Northwestern team to make the NCAA Division I men's basketball tournament. Then, Northwestern endured 5 consecutive losing seasons before the 2022–23 team was invited to the 2023 NCAA Division I men's basketball tournament.

Martinelli's role increased as a sophomore. On December 10, 2023, Martinelli posted what was a career-high 22 points on 10–12 shooting off the bench in a 91–59 win over Detroit Mercy. Northwestern was ranked 25th in the AP Poll in the poll released the following day. Following a mid-February season-ending injury to Northwestern's top 3-point shooter, Ty Berry, Martinelli moved into the starting lineup on February 11 against Penn State. On February 28, 2024, Martinelli posted a new career high of 27 points in a 68–61 victory over Maryland, giving Northwestern its first 2-game sweep of Maryland since Maryland joined the Big Ten Conference in 2012. After subsequent injury issues Martinelli was thrust into heavy minutes, playing at least 35 minutes in 7 of Northwestern's final 8 regular season games. The 2023–24 Wildcats were the first Northwestern team to earn back-to-back NCAA tournament invitations.

As a junior, Martinelli emerged as the team's leading scorer. In the November 4 season opener against Lehigh, he recorded a double-double, tallying 26 points and 10 rebounds in a 90–46 victory. He followed that up with career highs of 32 points and 14 rebounds against Dayton in a 71–66 loss on November 9. In the two games, he posted a 75% field goal percentage and was 5–5 on his three point shots, earning Big Ten Player of the Week. Against Maryland on January 16, he scored 22 points, including a buzzer-beater off an inbounds pass made with 0.7 seconds left in overtime, helping lead the Wildcats to a 76–74 victory. Martinelli won another Big Ten Player of the week award on March 3. He set the Northwestern single-season scoring record as a junior, surpassing John Shurna (661 points). He finished his junior season with 676 points. He was a 2025 2nd team All-Big Ten selection by both the Big Ten media and Big Ten coaches. He averaged 20.5 points per game and added 6.2 rebounds per game. Martinelli was the Big Ten scoring leader, and he entered himself into the 2025 NBA draft, but he eventually withdrew his name and returned for his senior season. The feedback that he got from NBA executives and coaches was that his midrange skills were not important to his evaluation and that he needed to improve his three-point shot and his defense.

As a senior, there were high expectations on Martinelli, as signified by his election to the Preseason All-Big Ten team as well as his inclusion on several preseason award watchlists. During the season, he continued to perform as a consistent scorer. During the November 7 game against Boston University Martinelli's extended his 15-point scoring streak to 20 games, which was the longest among power conference players. During the November 14 game against DePaul, Martinelli converted the tiebreaking free throws in an 81–79 victory with 3 seconds remaining and extended is 10-point scoring streak to 30 games. By the time he tied his career high with 34 points against Penn State on January 29, 2026, it was his fourth game with at least 32 points and he was the fourth leading scorer in the country. On February 24, Martinelli scored 21 of his 28 points in the second half, which helped Northwestern overcome a 9-point halftime deficit against Indiana. The win gave Northwestern its first 4-game win streak against Indiana on the road and its first 6-game win streak against Indiana. The last time Northwestern had beaten Indiana 5 times in a row had been 1915. On February 28, 2026, Martinelli converted a game-winning basket with 1.8 seconds remaining against Oregon for a 63–62 victory. In the game Martinelli contributed 22 points, 11 rebounds and a career-high 7 assists. On March 2, Martinelli earned his third career Big Ten Player of the Week Award. Andy Katz also selected Martinelli as the NCAA March Madness player of the week. The effort was also recognized as an honorable mention for Associated Press national player of the week.

Martinelli repeated as a 2026 2nd team All-Big Ten selection by both the Big Ten media and Big Ten coaches. The Associated Press media selectors recognized Martinelli as a 2026 first team All-Big Ten selection. He repeated as the leading scorer in the Big Ten with a 2025 average of 23.0. This was the highest scoring average by a Wildcat since the 1969-70 season. Martinelli was named first team Academic All-America in both 2025 and 2026. He is the second Wildcat to be named first team Academic All-America in back-to-back season (Shon Morris: 87, 88). Martinelli joined Zach Edey, Keegan Murray, and Luka Garza as the only Big Ten players to average at least 22 points and 6 rebounds per game in the last 30 years. On May 1, the NBA announced its 73 player May 10–17 NBA draft combine invitation list, which included Martinelli. Martinelli concluded his Big Ten career with having the most single-season points (759), most single-season Big Ten tournament points (77), and a career high Big Ten tournament points (139).

== Professional career ==
On June 24, 2026, Martinelli was selected with the 55th overall pick by the New York Knicks in the 2026 NBA draft. He was then traded to the Houston Rockets and then finally traded to the Los Angeles Clippers for cash considerations. On July 6, Martinelli was signed to a standard two-way contract with the Clippers. That same day, it was announced that Martinelli, alongside the 2026 Clipper's draft picks Keaton Wagler (5th overall pick), and Baba Miller (36th overall pick) would be participating in the 2026 NBA Summer League. During the Summer League, Martinelli appeared in all five games for the Clippers, where in 24.1 minutes of game time, he averaged 14.8 points, 6.4 rebounds, and 1.6 assists. On the NBA opening night (October 21), Martinelli appeared in two minutes against the Sacramento Kings, where he recorded one assist and rebound, but scored no points. He was listed on the San Diego Clippers training camp roster on October 26 along with fellow two-way players Jalen Pickett and Cam Christie. After a few inconsequential appearances, Martinelli posted his first double-digit scoring effort with 10 points (on 4–5 shooting, including 2–3 three-point shots) late in a blowout on November 1 against the Golden State Warriors. When the San Diego Clippers opened their season on November 6, Martinelli posted a team-high 27 points, seven rebounds and three assists.

== Career statistics ==
Legend
GP	Games played	GS	Games started	MPG	Minutes per game
FG%	Field goal percentage	3P%	3-point field goal percentage	FT%	Free throw percentage
RPG	Rebounds per game	APG	Assists per game	SPG	Steals per game
BPG	Blocks per game	PPG	Points per game	**Bold**	Career high

=== College ===
Year	Team	GP	GS	MPG	FG%	3P%	FT%	RPG	APG	SPG	BPG	PPG
2022–23	Northwestern	20	0	10.1	**.512**	**.500**	.500	1.5	.3	.3	–	2.6
2023–24	Northwestern	**34**	11	26.0	.492	.271	.780	4.3	1.1	.5	.2	8.8
2024–25	Northwestern	33	**33**	**37.6**	.471	.333	.728	**6.2**	1.7	.7	.2	20.5
2025–26	Northwestern	33	**33**	35.6	.510	.417	**.809**	**6.2**	**2.0**	**.8**	**.4**	**23.0**

== See also ==
- Northwestern Wildcats men's basketball statistical leaders
