= 2024–25 Northwestern Wildcats men's basketball team =

American college basketball season

2024–25 Northwestern Wildcats men's basketball
- Conference: Big Ten Conference
- Record: 17–16 (7–13 Big Ten)
- Head coach: Chris Collins (12th season)
- Assistant coaches: Chris Lowery; Bryant McIntosh; Shane Southwell
- Home arena: Welsh–Ryan Arena

2024–25 Big Ten Conference men's basketball standings
	Conf.				Overall
Team	W		L	PCT	W		L	PCT
No. 7 Michigan State	17	–	3	.850	30	–	7	.811
No. 9 Maryland	14	–	6	.700	27	–	9	.750
No. 10 Michigan †	14	–	6	.700	27	–	10	.730
UCLA	13	–	7	.650	23	–	11	.676
No. 16 Wisconsin	13	–	7	.650	27	–	10	.730
No. 14 Purdue	13	–	7	.650	24	–	12	.667
Illinois	12	–	8	.600	22	–	13	.629
Oregon	12	–	8	.600	25	–	10	.714
Indiana	10	–	10	.500	19	–	13	.594
Ohio State	9	–	11	.450	17	–	15	.531
Rutgers	8	–	12	.400	15	–	17	.469
Minnesota	7	–	13	.350	15	–	17	.469
Northwestern	7	–	13	.350	17	–	16	.515
USC	7	–	13	.350	17	–	18	.486
Iowa	7	–	13	.350	17	–	16	.515
Nebraska	7	–	13	.350	21	–	14	.600
Penn State	6	–	14	.300	16	–	15	.516
Washington	4	–	16	.200	13	–	18	.419
† 2025 Big Ten tournament winner Rankings from AP poll

The 2024–25 Northwestern Wildcats men's basketball team represented Northwestern University in the 2024–25 NCAA Division I men's basketball season. They were led by 12th-year head coach Chris Collins. The Wildcats played their home games at Welsh–Ryan Arena in Evanston, Illinois as members of the Big Ten Conference. Following the team's loss in the Big Ten Tournament, they stated that they would decline any postseason invitations.

== Previous season ==
The Wildcats finished the 2023–24 season 21–10, 12–8 in Big Ten play to finish in a tie for third place. As the No. 4 seed in the Big Ten tournament, they lost in the quarterfinals by No. 5 seed Wisconsin. The Wildcats received an at-large bid to the NCAA tournament, their third-ever appearance, as the No. 9 seed in the East Region. The Wildcats defeated Florida Atlantic in the first round before falling to 2 time National Champion UConn in the second round, closing their season with an overall record of 22–12.

== Offseason ==
=== Departures ===
Name	Number	Pos.	Height	Weight	Year	Hometown	Reason for departure
Boo Buie	0	G	6'2"	180	GS Senior	Albany, NY	Graduated/undrafted in 2024 NBA draft
Ryan Langborg	5	G	6'4"	195	GS Senior	San Diego, CA	Graduated
Parker Strauss	10	G	6'3"	180	Freshman	Costa Mesa, CA	Transferred to UC Riverside
Blake Preston	32	F	6'9"	240	GS Senior	Charlotte, NC	Graduated

=== Incoming transfers ===
Name	Number	Pos.	Height	Weight	Year	Hometown	Previous college
Jalen Leach	1	G	6'4"	200	GS Senior	Nyack, NY	Fairfield
Keenan Fitzmorris	5	C	7'0"	250	GS Senior	Overland Park, KS	Stony Brook

=== Recruiting classes ===
==== 2024 recruiting class ====
College recruiting information
Name	Hometown	School	Height	Weight	Commit date
K.J. Windham #27 PG	Indianapolis, IN	Ben Davis High School	6 ft 1 in (1.85 m)	175 lb (79 kg)	Aug 5, 2023
K.J. Windham #27 PG	Recruit ratings: Rivals: 247Sports: ESPN: (79)				
Angelo Ciaravino; SF	Chicago, IL	Mount Carmel High School	6 ft 5 in (1.96 m)	175 lb (79 kg)	Aug 9, 2023
Angelo Ciaravino; SF	Recruit ratings: Rivals: 247Sports: ESPN: (NR)				
Overall recruit ranking:
Note: In many cases, Scout, Rivals, 247Sports, On3, and ESPN may conflict in their listings of height and weight.; In these cases, the average was taken. ESPN grades are on a 100-point scale.; Sources: "2024 Northwestern Commits". Rivals.; "2024 Team Ranking". Rivals.

==== 2025 recruiting class ====
College recruiting information (2025)
Name	Hometown	School	Height	Weight	Commit date
Phoenix Gill; SG	Chicago, IL	Saint Ignatius College Prep	6 ft 2 in (1.88 m)	175 lb (79 kg)	Jun 10, 2024
Phoenix Gill; SG	Recruit ratings: Rivals: 247Sports: ESPN: (N/A)				
Jake West; PG	Malvern, PA	William Penn Charter School	6 ft 3 in (1.91 m)	165 lb (75 kg)	Oct 15, 2024
Jake West; PG	Recruit ratings: Rivals: 247Sports: ESPN: (81)				
Overall recruit ranking:
Note: In many cases, Scout, Rivals, 247Sports, On3, and ESPN may conflict in their listings of height and weight.; In these cases, the average was taken. ESPN grades are on a 100-point scale.; Sources: "2025 Northwestern Commits". Rivals.; "2025 Team Ranking". Rivals.

== Roster ==
2024–25 Northwestern Wildcats men's basketball team
Players
Coaches

Pos.	#	Name	Height	Weight	Year	Previous school	Hometown
G	1	Jalen Leach	6 ft 4 in (1.93 m)	200 lb (91 kg)	GS	Fairfield	Nyack, New York
F	2	Nick Martinelli	6 ft 7 in (2.01 m)	200 lb (91 kg)	Jr	Glenbrook South High School	Glenview, Illinois
G	3	Ty Berry	6 ft 3 in (1.91 m)	185 lb (84 kg)	GS	Sunrise Christian Academy	Newton, Kansas
F	4	Blake Barkley	6 ft 7 in (2.01 m)	210 lb (95 kg)	RS Fr	Putnam Science Academy	Morgantown, West Virginia
C	5	Keenan Fitzmorris	7 ft 0 in (2.13 m)	250 lb (113 kg)	GS	Stony Brook	Overland Park, Kansas
G	11	Jordan Clayton	6 ft 2 in (1.88 m)	180 lb (82 kg)	So	Bradford Christian Academy	Medford, Massachusetts
G	13	Brooks Barnhizer	6 ft 6 in (1.98 m)	215 lb (98 kg)	Sr	Jefferson High School	Lafayette, Indiana
G	20	Justin Mullins	6 ft 6 in (1.98 m)	190 lb (86 kg)	Jr	Denver	Oak Park, Illinois
G	24	K.J. Windham	6 ft 3 in (1.91 m)	180 lb (82 kg)	Fr	Ben Davis High School	Indianapolis, Indiana
F	33	Luke Hunger	6 ft 10 in (2.08 m)	255 lb (116 kg)	RS So	Northfield Mount Hermon School	Montreal, Quebec
C	34	Matthew Nicholson	7 ft 0 in (2.13 m)	280 lb (127 kg)	GS	Clarkston High School	Clarkston, Michigan
G	43	Blake Smith (W)	6 ft 6 in (1.98 m)	175 lb (79 kg)	Jr	Germantown Academy	Blue Bell, Pennsylvania
G	44	Angelo Ciaravino	6 ft 5 in (1.96 m)	175 lb (79 kg)	Fr	Mount Carmel High School	Chicago, Illinois
F	54	Gus Hurlburt (W)	6 ft 9 in (2.06 m)	210 lb (95 kg)	RS So	Enderlin High School	Enderlin, North Dakota

Head coach

- Chris Collins (Duke)

Assistant coach(es)

- Chris Lowery (Southern Illinois)
- Bryant McIntosh (Northwestern)
- Shane Southwell (Kansas State)

Legend

- (C) Team captain
- (S) Suspended
- (I) Ineligible
- (W) Walk-on
- Injured
- Current redshirt

Roster

== Schedule and results ==
Date time, TV	Rank^{#}	Opponent^{#}	Result	Record	High points	High rebounds	High assists	Site (attendance) city, state
Exhibition
October 30, 2024*; 7:00 p.m., B1G+		Lewis	W 89–62		25 – Martinelli	6 – Martinelli	5 – Tied	Welsh–Ryan Arena; Evanston, IL
Regular season
November 4, 2024*; 7:00 p.m., Peacock		Lehigh	W 90–46	1–0	26 – Martinelli	10 – Martinelli	6 – Tied	Welsh–Ryan Arena (5,521); Evanston, IL
November 9, 2024*; 6:30 p.m., ESPN+		at Dayton	L 66–71	1–1	32 – Martinelli	14 – Martinelli	3 – Tied	UD Arena (13,407); Dayton, OH
November 12, 2024*; 6:00 p.m., BTN		UIC	W 83–74	2–1	27 – Martinelli	7 – Mullins	5 – Windham	Welsh–Ryan Arena (5,492); Evanston, IL
November 15, 2024*; 7:00 p.m., Peacock		Eastern Illinois	W 67–58 ^{OT}	3–1	27 – Leach	12 – Nicholson	4 – Nicholson	Welsh–Ryan Arena (5,969); Evanston, IL
November 19, 2024*; 8:00 p.m., BTN		Montana State	W 72–69	4–1	22 – Martinelli	10 – Barnhizer	4 – Barnhizer	Welsh–Ryan Arena (5,034); Evanston, IL
November 22, 2024*; 7:00 p.m., B1G+		Pepperdine; Arizona Tip-Off campus site game	W 68–50	5–1	21 – Leach	7 – Tied	4 – Barnhizer	Welsh–Ryan Arena (5,853); Evanston, IL
November 28, 2024*; 6:00 p.m., CBSSN		vs. Butler; Arizona Tip-Off Cactus Division semifinals	L 69–71	5–2	24 – Barnhizer	8 – Martinelli	2 – Tied	Mullett Arena; Tempe, AZ
November 29, 2024*; 6:00 p.m., CBSSN		vs. UNLV; Arizona Tip-Off Cactus Division 3rd place game	W 66–61	6–2	23 – Barnhizer	9 – Barnhizer	6 – Barnhizer	Mullett Arena; Tempe, AZ
December 3, 2024; 6:00 p.m., Peacock		at Iowa	L 79–80	6–3 (0–1)	21 – Barnhizer	10 – Barnhizer	4 – Martinelli	Carver–Hawkeye Arena (7,698); Iowa City, IA
December 6, 2024; 8:00 p.m., BTN		No. 19 Illinois; Rivalry	W 70–66 ^{OT}	7–3 (1–1)	27 – Martinelli	9 – Tied	5 – Leach	Welsh–Ryan Arena (7,039); Evanston, IL
December 15, 2024*; 2:30 p.m., BTN		vs. Georgia Tech; Milwaukee Tip-Off	W 71–60	8–3	20 – Barnhizer	10 – Barnhizer	5 – Hunger	Fiserv Forum; Milwaukee, WI
December 21, 2024*; 3:00 p.m., BTN		DePaul	W 84–64	9–3	23 – Martinelli	12 – Barnhizer	6 – Barnhizer	Welsh–Ryan Arena (5,752); Evanston, IL
December 29, 2024*; 12:30 p.m., Peacock		Northeastern	W 85–60	10–3	23 – Berry	10 – Barnhizer	7 – Barnhizer	Welsh–Ryan Arena (5,944); Evanston, IL
January 2, 2025; 7:00 p.m., Peacock		at Penn State	L 80–84	10–4 (1–2)	20 – Barnhizer	10 – Barnhizer	8 – Barnhizer	Bryce Jordan Center (5,579); State College, PA
January 5, 2025; 1:00 p.m., BTN		at No. 20 Purdue	L 61–79	10–5 (1–3)	19 – Ciaravino	8 – Barnhizer	5 – Barnhizer	Mackey Arena (14,876); West Lafayette, IN
January 12, 2025; 11:00 a.m., FOX		No. 16 Michigan State	L 68–78	10–6 (1–4)	27 – Martinelli	8 – Barnhizer	4 – Leach	Welsh–Ryan Arena (7,039); Evanston, IL
January 16, 2025; 8:00 p.m., BTN		Maryland	W 76–74 ^{OT}	11–6 (2–4)	22 – Martinelli	10 – Barnhizer	6 – Leach	Welsh–Ryan Arena (5,871); Evanston, IL
January 19, 2025; 1:00 p.m., BTN		at No. 20 Michigan	L 76–80 ^{OT}	11–7 (2–5)	21 – Barnhizer	16 – Nicholson	5 – Leach	Crisler Center (12,707); Ann Arbor, MI
January 22, 2025; 6:00 p.m., BTN		Indiana	W 79–70	12–7 (3–5)	23 – Berry	8 – Barnhizer	7 – Leach	Welsh–Ryan Arena (7,039); Evanston, IL
January 26, 2025; 2:00 p.m., BTN		at No. 17 Illinois; Rivalry	L 74–83	12–8 (3–6)	17 – Tied	6 – Berry	4 – Leach	State Farm Arena (15,544); Champaign, IL
January 29, 2025; 8:00 p.m., BTN		Rutgers	L 72–79	12–9 (3–7)	23 – Leach	10 – Martinelli	6 – Barnhizer	Welsh–Ryan Arena (5,884); Evanston, IL
February 1, 2025; 1:00 p.m., FS1		No. 17 Wisconsin	L 69–75	12–10 (3–8)	23 – Leach	7 – Tied	7 – Leach	Welsh–Ryan Arena (7,039); Evanston, IL
February 4, 2025; 8:00 p.m., BTN		USC	W 77–75	13–10 (4–8)	27 – Martinelli	13 – Marinelli	6 – Leach	Welsh–Ryan Arena (5,440); Evanston, IL
February 8, 2025; 9:30 p.m., BTN		at Washington	L 71–76	13–11 (4–9)	23 – Martinelli	10 – Martinelli	5 – Clayton	Alaska Airlines Arena (8,064); Seattle, WA
February 11, 2025; 10:00 p.m., BTN		at Oregon	L 75–81	13–12 (4–10)	23 – Berry	6 – Martinelli	4 – Tied	Matthew Knight Arena (6,039); Eugene, OR
February 16, 2025; 2:00 p.m., BTN		Nebraska	L 64–68	13–13 (4–11)	23 – Tied	12 – Nicholson	3 – Windham	Welsh–Ryan Arena (7,039); Evanston, IL
February 20, 2025; 5:30 p.m., FS1		at Ohio State	W 70–49	14–13 (5–11)	18 – Martinelli	6 – Tied	2 – Tied	Value City Arena (12,684); Columbus, OH
February 25, 2025; 6:00 p.m., Peacock		at Minnesota	W 75–63	15–13 (6–11)	29 – Martinelli	7 – Berry	7 – Windham	Williams Arena (8,890); Minneapolis, MN
February 28, 2025; 8:00 p.m., FS1		Iowa	W 68–57	16–13 (7–11)	20 – Windham	9 – Martinelli	4 – Berry	Welsh–Ryan Arena (6,249); Evanston, IL
March 3, 2025; 8:00 p.m., FS1		UCLA	L 69–73	16–14 (7–12)	22 – Berry	7 – Berry	7 – Clayton	Welsh–Ryan Arena (6,099); Evanston, IL
March 8, 2025; 2:00 p.m., Peacock		at No. 13 Maryland	L 61–74	16–15 (7–13)	19 – Reese	11 – Reese	4 – Rice	Xfinity Center (17,950); College Park, MD
Big Ten tournament
March 12, 2025; 2:30 p.m., Peacock	(13)	vs. (12) Minnesota; First round	W 72-64	17–15	28 – Martinelli	7 – Martinelli	4 – Clayton	Gainbridge Fieldhouse; Indianapolis, IN
March 13, 2025; 1:30 p.m., BTN	(13)	vs. (5) No. 18 Wisconsin; Second Round	L 63–70	17–16	22 – Martinelli	7 – Tied	5 – Windham	Gainbridge Fieldhouse (13,216); Indianapolis, IN
*Non-conference game. ^{#}Rankings from AP Poll. (#) Tournament seedings in parentheses. All times are in Central Time.
