= Dominic Martinelli =

American college basketball player

Personal information
- Listed height: 6 ft 4 in (1.93 m)
- Listed weight: 195 lb (88 kg)

Career information
- High school: Glenbrook South (Glenview, Illinois)
- College: Northwestern (2020–2021); St. Thomas (2021–2024); Chicago (2024–2025)

Dominic Martinelli is a former American college basketball player who previously played for Northwestern, St. Thomas and University of Chicago. At Glenbrook South High School, he established the career and single-game scoring records. There, Martinelli was an All-state selection and is listed several times in the Illinois High School Association (IHSA) record book. He is the older brother of Nick Martinelli.

== Background and early life ==
Martinelli grew up with a basketball hoop in his driveway. Martinelli is the older brother of 2-time (2025 & 2026) Big Ten Conference scoring champion Nick Martinelli. His older brother, Jimmy, started for NYU from 2016 through 2020. Dom was called up from junior varsity during his freshman season.

During his freshman and sophomore season Glenbrook South had back-to-back 9-win seasons. Prior to his 2018-19 junior season Glenbrook South had had only 1 10-win season in the prior 4 and one 15-win season since 2006. On November 29, 2018, Martinelli helped Glenbrook South defeat Evanston Township High School (the 2018 IHSA Class 4A 3rd place team) for the first time in 13 matchups with a career-high 34 points to start the season with a 6–0 record. During the year, Dom led Glenbrook South with a 25 point scoring average and helped the team turn around a 9-19 record from the previous season into a 24-win season and an IHSA Class 4A regional championship. In the regional championship game, Martinelli posted 26 points in a 65–42 victory over Niles West High School. Glenbrook South eventually fell 68-60 to Evanston in a Niles North Sectional semifinal despite 32 points (14 in the fourth quarter) from Martinelli.

As a senior, Martinelli was averaging over 25 points per game (including over 8 made free throws per game), but had no Division I offers in late January. As of March 8, 2020, his only offers were from NCAA Division II schools: Northern Michigan and Gannon University as well as various NCAA Division I preferred walk-on offers. Martinelli had posted 23 points in as Glenbrook moved to a 29–4 record with a 65–49 win against Maine West High School in the Class 4A Regional championship on March 6, 2020. Glenbrook South lost to Evanston 62–57 in the Class 4A sectional against Evanston to finish 29–5. Martinelli had been chasing a state record and ended the year 5 free throws shy (282) of the IHSA single-season free throw record (287), but one ahead of Patrick Beverley at 281. For the year, he posted 26.3 points, 5.9 rebounds and 2.2 assists, but his only Division I offer came in April from Missouri-Kansas City, who was coached by former Glenbrook North star Billy Donlon. In late April, he got a preferred walk-on offer from Northwestern that he accepted. Northwestern's head coach Chris Collins and head assistant coach, Brian James had both played at Glenbrook North. The knock on Martinelli was his lack of athleticism and slow shot release.

He is listed in the IHSA record book among the state's all-time leaders in career points (2059), career free throws made (578), single-season free throws made (282), consecutive single-season free throws made (45) and consecutive single-game free throws made (18). His 2,059 career point total broke the school record of 1,450 by Brad Niemann. He also established the school single-game record with 51 points against Buffalo Grove High School. Martinelli finished sixth in the Illinois Mr. Basketball voting. Martinelli was a 2nd-team Associated Press Class 4A All-state selection. He was a 2020 Chicago Sun-Times All-state selection.

== College career ==
With the 2020–21 Northwestern Wildcats, Martinelli posted a career-high four points on December 15, 2020, during a 100–48 victory against the Quincy Hawks. The 2021–22 St. Thomas Tommies were the first St. Thomas team to compete in NCAA Division I after moving from NCAA Division III. Martinelli debuted for the team on December 14 with 10 points against Northland College in a 109–50 victory. Martinelli posted a career-high 18 points on 6–10 shooting for the 2022–23 Tommies on November 29, 2022, in a 111–63 against North Central. He followed that with 10 points against Crown during a 91–56 victory in the next game on December 3. Martinelli posted 12 points for the Chicago Maroons men's basketball team on November 20, 2024, which was one point short of a team high in a 70–68 loss to Lake Forest College. The team became the school's first NCAA Division III men's basketball tournament entrant since 2008 by qualifying for the 2025 tournament.
