= 2025–26 Northwestern Wildcats men's basketball team =

American college basketball season

2025–26 Northwestern Wildcats men's basketball
- Conference: Big Ten Conference
- Record: 15–19 (5–15 Big Ten)
- Head coach: Chris Collins (13th season)
- Assistant coaches: Chris Lowery; Bryant McIntosh; Shane Southwell
- Home arena: Welsh–Ryan Arena

2025–26 Big Ten Conference men's basketball standings
	Conf.				Overall
Team	W		L	PCT	W		L	PCT
No. 1 Michigan	19	–	1	.950	37	–	3	.925
No. 14 Nebraska	15	–	5	.750	28	–	7	.800
No. 5 Illinois	15	–	5	.750	28	–	9	.757
No. 11 Michigan State	15	–	5	.750	27	–	8	.771
No. 25 Wisconsin	14	–	6	.700	24	–	11	.686
No. 6 Purdue †	13	–	7	.650	30	–	9	.769
UCLA	13	–	7	.650	24	–	12	.667
Ohio State	12	–	8	.600	21	–	13	.618
No. 15 Iowa	10	–	10	.500	24	–	13	.649
Indiana	9	–	11	.450	18	–	14	.563
Minnesota	8	–	12	.400	15	–	18	.455
USC	7	–	13	.350	18	–	14	.563
Washington	7	–	13	.350	16	–	17	.485
Rutgers	6	–	14	.300	14	–	20	.412
Northwestern	5	–	15	.250	15	–	19	.441
Oregon	5	–	15	.250	12	–	20	.375
Maryland	4	–	16	.200	12	–	21	.364
Penn State	3	–	17	.150	12	–	20	.375
† 2026 Big Ten tournament winner Rankings from AP poll

The 2025–26 Northwestern Wildcats men's basketball team represented Northwestern University in the 2025–26 NCAA Division I men's basketball season. They were led by 13th-year head coach Chris Collins. The Wildcats played their home games at Welsh–Ryan Arena in Evanston, Illinois as members of the Big Ten Conference.

== Previous season ==
The Wildcats finished the 2024–25 season 17–16, 7–13 in Big Ten play to finish in a five-way tie for 12th place. As the No. 13 seed in the Big Ten tournament, they defeated Minnesota in the first round before losing to Wisconsin in the second round. Following the team's loss, they declined any postseason invitations.

== Offseason ==
=== Departures ===
Northwestern departures
Name	Number	Pos.	Height	Weight	Year	Hometown	Reason for departure
Blake Barkley	4	F	6'7"	220	RS sophomore	Morgantown, West Virginia	Transferred to East Tennessee State
Brooks Barnhizer	13	G	6'6"	230	Senior	Lafayette, Indiana	Drafted in the 2nd round (44th overall) during the 2025 NBA Draft by Oklahoma City Thunder
Keenan Fitzmorris	4	C	7'0"	260	Graduate	Overland Park, Kansas	Graduated
Luke Hunger	33	F	6'10"	260	RS junior	Montreal, Quebec	Transferred to George Washington

=== Incoming transfers ===
Northwestern incoming transfers
Name	Number	Pos.	Height	Weight	Year	Hometown	Previous school
Max Green	10	G	6'6"	190	Sophomore	Buckner, Kentucky	Holy Cross
Arrinten Page	22	C	6'11"	245	Junior	Marietta, Georgia	Cincinnati
Jayden Reid	4	G	5'10"	160	Junior	Glen Head, New York	South Florida

=== 2025 recruiting class ===
College recruiting
Name	Hometown	School	Height	Weight	Commit date
Jake West; PG	Malvern, PA	William Penn Charter School	6 ft 3 in (1.91 m)	165 lb (75 kg)	Oct 15, 2024
Jake West; PG	Recruit ratings: Rivals: 247Sports: ESPN: (81)				
Tre Singleton; PF	Jeffersonville, IN	Jeffersonville High School	6 ft 8 in (2.03 m)	215 lb (98 kg)	Oct 9, 2024
Tre Singleton; PF	Recruit ratings: Rivals: 247Sports: ESPN: (79)				
Tyler Kropp; PF	Powell, OH	Olentangy Liberty High School	6 ft 7 in (2.01 m)	200 lb (91 kg)	Oct 4, 2024
Tyler Kropp; PF	Recruit ratings: Rivals: 247Sports: ESPN: (79)				
Cade Bennerman; C	Nashville, TN	Father Ryan High School	6 ft 11 in (2.11 m)	195 lb (88 kg)	Nov 6, 2024
Cade Bennerman; C	Recruit ratings: Rivals: 247Sports: ESPN: (79)				
Phoenix Gill; SG	Chicago, IL	Saint Ignatius College Prep	6 ft 2 in (1.88 m)	175 lb (79 kg)	Jun 10, 2024
Phoenix Gill; SG	Recruit ratings: Rivals: 247Sports: ESPN: (77)				
Overall recruit ranking: Rivals: 44 247Sports: 56
Note: In many cases, Scout, Rivals, 247Sports, On3, and ESPN may conflict in their listings of height and weight.; In these cases, the average was taken. ESPN grades are on a 100-point scale.; Sources: "2025 Northwestern Commits". Rivals.; "2025 Team Ranking". Rivals.

== Roster ==
2025–26 Northwestern Wildcats men's basketball team
Players
Coaches

Pos.	#	Name	Height	Weight	Year	Previous school	Hometown
F	1	Tyler Kropp	6 ft 9 in (2.06 m)	230 lb (104 kg)	Fr	Olentangy Liberty High School	Powell, Ohio
F	2	Nick Martinelli	6 ft 7 in (2.01 m)	225 lb (102 kg)	Sr	Glenbrook South High School	Glenview, Illinois
G	3	Jake West	6 ft 3 in (1.91 m)	170 lb (77 kg)	Fr	William Penn Charter School	Malvern, Pennsylvania
G	4	Jayden Reid	5 ft 10 in (1.78 m)	160 lb (73 kg)	Jr	South Florida	Westbury, New York
F	8	Tre Singleton	6 ft 8 in (2.03 m)	215 lb (98 kg)	Fr	Jeffersonville High School	Jeffersonville, Indiana
G	10	Max Green	6 ft 6 in (1.98 m)	190 lb (86 kg)	So	Holy Cross	La Grange, Kentucky
G	11	Jordan Clayton	6 ft 2 in (1.88 m)	185 lb (84 kg)	Jr	Bradford Christian Academy	Medford, Massachusetts
G	13	Phoenix Gill	6 ft 2 in (1.88 m)	185 lb (84 kg)	Fr	Saint Ignatius College Prep	Chicago, Illinois
G	20	Justin Mullins	6 ft 6 in (1.98 m)	200 lb (91 kg)	Sr	Denver	Oak Park, Illinois
F	22	Arrinten Page	6 ft 11 in (2.11 m)	246 lb (112 kg)	Jr	Cincinnati	Atlanta, Georgia
G	24	K.J. Windham	6 ft 3 in (1.91 m)	180 lb (82 kg)	Fr	Ben Davis High School	Indianapolis, Indiana
F	35	Cade Bennerman	7 ft 0 in (2.13 m)	205 lb (93 kg)	Fr	Father Ryan High School	Nashville, Tennessee
G	43	Blake Smith (W)	6 ft 6 in (1.98 m)	190 lb (86 kg)	Sr	Germantown Academy	Blue Bell, Pennsylvania
G	44	Angelo Ciaravino	6 ft 6 in (1.98 m)	195 lb (88 kg)	So	Mount Carmel High School	Chicago, Illinois
F	54	Gus Hurlburt (W)	6 ft 9 in (2.06 m)	210 lb (95 kg)	RS Jr	Enderlin High School	Enderlin, North Dakota

Head coach

- Chris Collins (Duke)

Assistant coach(es)

- Chris Lowery (Southern Illinois)
- Bryant McIntosh (Northwestern)
- Shane Southwell (Kansas State)

Legend

- (C) Team captain
- (S) Suspended
- (I) Ineligible
- (W) Walk-on
- Injured
- Current redshirt

Roster

== Schedule and results ==
Date time, TV	Rank^{#}	Opponent^{#}	Result	Record	High points	High rebounds	High assists	Site (attendance) city, state
Exhibition
October 26, 2025*; 12:00 p.m., ESPN+		at No. 16 Iowa State	L 72–80	–	20 – Martinelli	5 – Singleton	4 – Clayton	Hilton Coliseum (13,560); Ames, IA
October 29, 2025*; 7:00 p.m., B1G+		Illinois State	W 100–65	–	21 – Martinelli	9 – Martinelli	11 – Erid	Welsh–Ryan Arena; Evanston, IL
Regular season
November 3, 2025*; 7:00 p.m., B1G+		Mercyhurst	W 70–47	1–0	18 – Page	12 – Page	3 – Tied	Welsh–Ryan Arena (4,607); Evanston, IL
November 7, 2025*; 5:00 p.m., Peacock		Boston University	W 76–52	2–0	20 – Martinelli	9 – Martinelli	8 – Reid	Welsh–Ryan Arena (4,995); Evanston, IL
November 10, 2025*; 7:30 p.m., BTN		Cleveland State	W 110–63	3–0	21 – Martinelli	9 – Page	8 – Reid	Welsh–Ryan Arena (4,426); Evanston, IL
November 14, 2025*; 7:30 p.m., TruTV		at DePaul	W 81–79	4–0	24 – Martinelli	5 – Tied	4 – Tied	Wintrust Arena (5,298); Chicago, IL
November 21, 2025*; 4:00 p.m., CBSSN		vs. Virginia; Greenbrier Tip-Off	L 78–83	4–1	25 – Reid	6 – Page	5 – Reid	The Greenbrier (1,209); White Sulphur Springs, WV
November 23, 2025*; 4:00 p.m., CBSSN		vs. South Carolina; Greenbrier Tip-Off	W 79–77	5–1	25 – Martinelli	7 – Martinelli	9 – Reid	The Greenbrier (782); White Sulphur Springs, WV
November 27, 2025*; 9:50 p.m., BTN		vs. Oklahoma State; Thanksgiving Classic Chicago	L 81–86	5–2	28 – Martinelli	10 – Martinelli	6 – Reid	United Center (10,766); Chicago, IL
December 3, 2025; 8:00 p.m., BTN		at Wisconsin	L 73–85	5–3 (0–1)	21 – Page	10 – Singleton	4 – Tied	Kohl Center (14,345); Madison, WI
December 6, 2025; 1:00 p.m., BTN		Ohio State	L 82–86	5–4 (0–2)	32 – Martinelli	9 – Page	6 – Reid	Welsh–Ryan Arena (5,448); Evanston, IL
December 13, 2025*; 1:00 p.m., BTN		Jackson State	W 93–53	6–4	22 – Martinelli	8 – Mullins	4 – Tied	Welsh–Ryan Arena (5,007); Evanston, IL
December 16, 2025*; 7:00 p.m., Peacock		Valparaiso	W 86–70	7–4	29 – Martinelli	7 – Page	5 – Reid	Welsh–Ryan Arena (4,525); Evanston, IL
December 20, 2025*; 3:00 p.m., Peacock		vs. Butler; Indy Classic	L 58–61	7–5	14 – Reid	6 – Green	6 – Reid	Gainbridge Fieldhouse (16,912); Indianapolis, IN
December 30, 2025*; 4:00 p.m., BTN		Howard	W 80–60	8–5	32 – Martinelli	11 – Ciaravino	5 – Tied	Welsh–Ryan Arena (4,992); Evanston, IL
January 3, 2026; 4:00 p.m., BTN		Minnesota	L 78–84	8–6 (0–3)	26 – Martinelli	6 – Martinelli	7 – Reid	Welsh–Ryan Arena (5,088); Evanston, IL
January 8, 2026; 5:30 p.m., BTN		at No. 12 Michigan State	L 66–76	8–7 (0–4)	28 – Martinelli	5 – Tied	8 – Reid	Breslin Center (14,797); East Lansing, MI
January 11, 2026; 4:00 p.m., Peacock		at Rutgers	L 75–77 ^{OT}	8–8 (0–5)	34 – Martinelli	12 – Martinelli	6 – Reid	Jersey Mike's Arena (8,000); Piscataway, NJ
January 14, 2026; 7:30 p.m., BTN		No. 13 Illinois; Rivalry	L 68–79	8–9 (0–6)	28 – Reid	8 – Page	3 – Reid	Welsh-Ryan Arena (7,039); Evanston, IL
January 17, 2026; 3:00 p.m., BTN		No. 8 Nebraska	L 58–77	8–10 (0–7)	22 – Martinelli	10 – Martinelli	5 – Reid	Welsh–Ryan Arena (5,783); Evanston, IL
January 21, 2026; 10:00 p.m., BTN		at USC	W 74–68	9–10 (1–7)	22 – Martinelli	9 – Kropp	5 – Tied	Galen Center (4,853); Los Angeles, CA
January 24, 2026; 5:00 p.m., FS1		at UCLA	L 64–71	9–11 (1–8)	20 – Martinelli	8 – Martinelli	3 – West	Pauley Pavilion (7,444); Los Angeles, CA
January 29, 2026; 7:00 p.m., Peacock		Penn State	W 94–73	10–11 (2–8)	34 – Martinelli	18 – Singleton	13 – West	Welsh–Ryan Arena (5,143); Evanston, IL
January 31, 2026; 7:00 p.m., BTN		Washington	L 62–76	10–12 (2–9)	19 – Martinelli	9 – Martinelli	5 – Reid	Welsh–Ryan Arena (5,587); Evanston, IL
February 4, 2026; 8:00 p.m., BTN		at No. 5 Illinois; Rivalry	L 44–84	10–13 (2–10)	8 – Singleton	4 – Tied	4 – Reid	State Farm Center (15,544); Champaign, IL
February 8, 2026; 2:00 p.m., FS1		at Iowa	L 70–76	10–14 (2–11)	21 – Martinelli	5 – Ciaravino	4 – West	Carver–Hawkeye Arena (11,474); Iowa City, IA
February 11, 2026; 7:30 p.m., BTN		No. 2 Michigan	L 75–87	10–15 (2–12)	20 – Reid	8 – Martinelli	5 – West	Welsh–Ryan Arena (7,039); Evanston, IL
February 14, 2026; 12:00 p.m., BTN		at No. 7 Nebraska	L 49–68	10–16 (2–13)	11 – Martinelli	4 – Ciaravino	4 – West	Pinnacle Bank Arena (15,262); Lincoln, NE
February 18, 2026; 7:00 p.m., BTN		Maryland	W 78–74	11–16 (3–13)	29 – Martinelli	5 – Ciaravino	7 – West	Welsh–Ryan Arena (4,974); Evanston, IL
February 24, 2026; 6:00 p.m., FS1		at Indiana	W 72–68	12–16 (4–13)	28 – Martinelli	8 – Singleton	4 – Page	Simon Skjodt Assembly Hall (17,222); Bloomington, IN
February 28, 2026; 1:00 p.m., BTN		Oregon	W 63–62	13–16 (5–13)	22 – Martinelli	11 – Martinelli	7 – Tied	Welsh–Ryan Arena (5,564); Evanston, IL
March 4, 2026; 7:30 p.m., BTN		No. 15 Purdue	L 66–70	13–17 (5–14)	28 – Martinelli	3 – Tied	4 – Reid	Welsh–Ryan Arena (7,039); Evanston, IL
March 7, 2026; 8:00 p.m., BTN		at Minnesota	L 66–67	13–18 (5–15)	23 – Martinelli	9 – Martinelli	6 – Clayton	Williams Arena (8,760); Minneapolis, MN
Big Ten tournament
March 10, 2026; 6:30 p.m., Peacock/NBCSN	(15)	vs. (18) Penn State; First round	W 76–66	14–18	24 – Martinelli	9 – Martinelli	9 – Reid	United Center (15,828); Chicago, IL
March 11, 2026; 5:30 p.m., BTN	(15)	vs. (10) Indiana; Second round	W 74–61	15–18	28 – Martinelli	5 – Tied	6 – Reid	United Center (16,122); Chicago, IL
March 12, 2026; 5:30 p.m., BTN	(15)	vs. (7) No. 18 Purdue; Third round	L 68–81	15–19	25 – Martinelli	5 – Singleton	9 – Reid	United Center; Chicago, IL
*Non-conference game. ^{#}Rankings from AP Poll. (#) Tournament seedings in parentheses. All times are in Central Time.
