= 2014–15 Northwestern Wildcats men's basketball team =

American college basketball season

2014–15 Northwestern Wildcats men's basketball
- Conference: Big Ten Conference
- Record: 15–17 (6–12 Big Ten)
- Head coach: Chris Collins
- Assistant coaches: Brian James; Patrick Baldwin; Armon Gates
- Home arena: Welsh-Ryan Arena

2014–15 Big Ten Conference men's basketball standings
	Conf.				Overall
Team	W		L	PCT	W		L	PCT
No. 3 Wisconsin †	16	–	2	.889	36	–	4	.900
No. 12 Maryland	14	–	4	.778	28	–	7	.800
No. 23 Michigan State	12	–	6	.667	27	–	12	.692
Iowa	12	–	6	.667	22	–	12	.647
Purdue	12	–	6	.667	21	–	13	.618
Ohio State	11	–	7	.611	24	–	11	.686
Indiana	9	–	9	.500	20	–	14	.588
Illinois	9	–	9	.500	19	–	14	.576
Michigan	8	–	10	.444	16	–	16	.500
Minnesota	6	–	12	.333	18	–	15	.545
Northwestern	6	–	12	.333	15	–	17	.469
Nebraska	5	–	13	.278	13	–	18	.419
Penn State	4	–	14	.222	18	–	16	.529
Rutgers	2	–	16	.111	10	–	22	.313
† 2015 Big Ten tournament winner Rankings from AP poll

The 2014–15 Northwestern Wildcats men's basketball team represented Northwestern University in the 2014–15 college basketball season. Led by second year head coach Chris Collins. The Wildcats were members of the Big Ten Conference and played their home games at Welsh-Ryan Arena. They finished the season 15–17, 6–12 in Big Ten play to finish in a tie for tenth place. They lost in the second round of the Big Ten tournament to Indiana.

== Previous season ==
The Wildcats finished the season 14–19, 6–12 in Big Ten play to finish in a tie for tenth place. They advanced to the quarterfinals of the Big Ten tournament where they lost to Michigan State.

== Departures ==
Name	Number	Pos.	Height	Weight	Year	Hometown	Notes
Drew Crawford	1	G/F	6'5"	215	RS Senior	Naperville, IL	Graduated
Mike Turner	10	F	6'8"	222	RS Sophomore	Chicago, IL	Transferred
Kale Abrahamson	13	G	6'7"	210	Junior	West Des Moines, IA	Transferred to Drake
James Montgomery III	15	G	6'4"	202	Senior	Los Angeles, CA	Graduated
Aaron Liberman	31	C/F	6'10"	215	RS Freshman	Los Angeles, CA	Transferred to Tulane
Chier Ajou	42	C	7'2"	245	Sophomore	Aweil, South Sudan	Transferred to Seton Hall
Nikola Cerina	45	F	6'9"	235	Senior	Topola, Serbia	Graduated

=== Incoming transfers ===
Name	Number	Pos.	Height	Weight	Year	Hometown	Previous School
Jeremiah Kreisberg	50	C/F	6'10"	240	Senior	Berkeley, CA	Elected to transfer from Yale. Will be eligible to play immediately since Kreisberg graduated from Yale.

== Incoming recruits ==
=== Class of 2014 recruits ===
College recruiting information
Name	Hometown	School	Height	Weight	Commit date
Vic Law; SF	South Holland, IL	St. Rita of Cascia High School	6 ft 6 in (1.98 m)	185 lb (84 kg)	Jul 4, 2013
Vic Law; SF	Recruit ratings: Scout: Rivals: 247Sports: ESPN:				
Bryant McIntosh; PG	Greensburg, IN	Greensburg	6 ft 3 in (1.91 m)	180 lb (82 kg)	Sep 9, 2013
Bryant McIntosh; PG	Recruit ratings: Scout: Rivals: 247Sports: ESPN:				
Gavin Skelly; PF	Westlake, OH	Westlake	6 ft 8 in (2.03 m)	225 lb (102 kg)	Jul 29, 2013
Gavin Skelly; PF	Recruit ratings: Scout: Rivals: 247Sports: ESPN:				
Johnnie Vassar; PG	San Juan Capistrano, CA	JSerra	6 ft 0 in (1.83 m)	160 lb (73 kg)	Dec 20, 2013
Johnnie Vassar; PG	Recruit ratings: Scout: Rivals: 247Sports: ESPN:				
Scott Lindsey; SG	Oak Park, IL	Fenwick	6 ft 5 in (1.96 m)	180 lb (82 kg)	Sep 22, 2013
Scott Lindsey; SG	Recruit ratings: Scout: Rivals: 247Sports: ESPN:				
Overall recruit ranking:
Note: In many cases, Scout, Rivals, 247Sports, On3, and ESPN may conflict in their listings of height and weight.; In these cases, the average was taken. ESPN grades are on a 100-point scale.; Sources: "2014 Team Ranking". Rivals.

=== Class of 2015 recruits ===
College recruiting information
Name	Hometown	School	Height	Weight	Commit date
Aaron Falzon; PF	Newton, MA	Northfield Mount Hermon	6 ft 8 in (2.03 m)	210 lb (95 kg)	Oct 13, 2014
Aaron Falzon; PF	Recruit ratings: Scout: Rivals: (83)				
Dererk Pardon; PF	Cleveland, OH	Villa Angela-St. Joseph High School	6 ft 8 in (2.03 m)	215 lb (98 kg)	Jun 7, 2014
Dererk Pardon; PF	Recruit ratings: Scout: Rivals: (79)				
Jordan Ash; SG	Westchester, IL	Saint Joseph High School	6 ft 2 in (1.88 m)	185 lb (84 kg)	Mar 19, 2014
Jordan Ash; SG	Recruit ratings: Scout: Rivals: (77)				
Overall recruit ranking:
Note: In many cases, Scout, Rivals, 247Sports, On3, and ESPN may conflict in their listings of height and weight.; In these cases, the average was taken. ESPN grades are on a 100-point scale.; Sources: "2015 Team Ranking". Rivals.

== Roster ==
2014–15 Northwestern Wildcats men's basketball team
Players
Coaches

Pos.	#	Name	Height	Weight	Year	Previous school	Hometown
G	0	Johnnie Vassar	6 ft 0 in (1.83 m)	185 lb (84 kg)	Fr	JSerra Catholic HS	Chicago, IL
G	3	Dave Sobolewski	6 ft 1 in (1.85 m)	180 lb (82 kg)	Sr	Benet Academy	Naperville, IL
F	4	Vic Law	6 ft 7 in (2.01 m)	185 lb (84 kg)	Fr	Saint Rita HS	South Holland, IL
G	14	Tre Demps	6 ft 2 in (1.88 m)	198 lb (90 kg)	RS Jr	Ronald Reagan HS	San Antonio, TX
G	20	Scottie Lindsey	6 ft 5 in (1.96 m)	175 lb (79 kg)	Fr	Fenwick HS	Hillsdale, IL
F	21	Nick Segura (W)	6 ft 6 in (1.98 m)	183 lb (83 kg)	Fr	The Heights School	McLean, VA
C	22	Alex Olah	7 ft 0 in (2.13 m)	270 lb (122 kg)	Jr	Traders Point Christian Acad.	Timișoara, Romania
G	23	JerShon Cobb	6 ft 5 in (1.96 m)	208 lb (94 kg)	RS Sr	Columbia HS	Decatur, GA
G	30	Bryant McIntosh	6 ft 3 in (1.91 m)	177 lb (80 kg)	Fr	Greensburg Community HS	New Castle, IN
F	32	Nathan Taphorn	6 ft 7 in (2.01 m)	215 lb (98 kg)	So	Pekin Community HS	Pekin, IL
G/F	34	Sanjay Lumpkin	6 ft 6 in (1.98 m)	220 lb (100 kg)	RS So	Benilde-St. Margaret's	Wayzata, MN
F	44	Gavin Skelly	6 ft 8 in (2.03 m)	219 lb (99 kg)	Fr	Westlake HS	Westlake, OH
C	50	Jeremiah Kreisberg	6 ft 10 in (2.08 m)	235 lb (107 kg)	Sr	Yale; Head-Royce School	Berkeley, CA

Head coach

- Chris Collins (Duke)

Assistant coach(es)

- Brian James (Illinois State)
- Patrick Baldwin (Northwestern)
- Armon Gates (Kent State)

Legend

- (C) Team captain
- (S) Suspended
- (I) Ineligible
- (W) Walk-on
- Injured
- Current redshirt

Roster
Last update: 2013-07-20

== Schedule and results ==
Date time, TV	Rank^{#}	Opponent^{#}	Result	Record	Site (attendance) city, state
Exhibition
Nov 7*; 7:00 pm		McKendree	W 102–52	–	Welsh-Ryan Arena (N/A); Evanston, IL
Non-conference regular season
Nov 14*; 7:00 pm		Houston Baptist	W 65–58	1–0	Welsh-Ryan Arena (6,372); Evanston, IL
Nov 17*; 6:00 pm		at Brown	W 69–56	2–0	Pizzitola Sports Center (1,503); Providence, RI
Nov 20*; 7:00 pm		North Florida; Cancún Challenge	W 69–67	3–0	Welsh-Ryan Arena (5,783); Evanston, IL
Nov 22*; 3:00 pm		Elon; Cancún Challenge	W 68–67 ^{OT}	4-0	Welsh-Ryan Arena (6,315); Evanston, IL
Nov 25*; 8:30 pm, CBSSN		vs. Miami (OH); Cancún Challenge semifinals	W 55–46	5–0	Hard Rock Hotel Riviera Maya (650); Cancún, MX
Nov 26*; 8:30 pm, CBSSN		vs. Northern Iowa; Cancún Challenge championship	L 42–61	5–1	Hard Rock Hotel Riviera Maya (650); Cancún, MX
Dec 3*; 8:15 pm, ESPNU		Georgia Tech; ACC–Big Ten Challenge	L 58–66	5–2	Welsh-Ryan Arena (6,133); Evanston, IL
Dec 6*; 3:30 pm, FOX		at No. 23 Butler	L 56–65	5–3	Hinkle Fieldhouse (7,920); Indianapolis, IN
Dec 14*; 5:00 pm, BTN		Mississippi Valley State	W 101–49	6–3	Welsh-Ryan Arena (6,277); Evanston, IL
Dec 17*; 7:00 pm		Central Michigan	L 67–80	6–4	Welsh-Ryan Arena (5,820); Evanston, IL
Dec 20*; 2:00 pm, BTN		Western Michigan	W 67–61	7–4	Welsh-Ryan Arena (6,612); Evanston, IL
Dec 22*; 1:00 pm, ESPN3		UIC	W 63–46	8–4	Welsh-Ryan Arena (6,503); Evanston, IL
Dec 27*; 2:00 pm, BTN		Northern Kentucky	W 76–55	9–4	Welsh-Ryan Arena (6,650); Evanston, IL
Big Ten regular season
Dec 30; 11:00 am, ESPNU		at Rutgers	W 51–47	10–4 (1–0)	The RAC (5,651); Piscataway, NJ
Jan 4; 7:30 pm, BTN		No. 4 Wisconsin	L 58–81	10–5 (1–1)	Welsh-Ryan Arena (8,117); Evanston, IL
Jan 11; 11:00 am, BTN		at Michigan State	L 77–84 ^{OT}	10–6 (1–2)	Breslin Center (14,797); East Lansing, MI
Jan 14; 8:00 pm, BTN		Illinois	L 67–72	10–7 (1–3)	Welsh-Ryan Arena (7,652); Evanston, IL
Jan 17; 7:15 pm, BTN		at Michigan	L 54–56	10–8 (1–4)	Crisler Center (12,707); Ann Arbor, MI
Jan 22; 6:00 pm, ESPN		Ohio State	L 67–69	10–9 (1–5)	Welsh-Ryan Arena (7,117); Evanston, IL
Jan 25; 6:30 pm, BTN		at No. 13 Maryland	L 67–68	10–10 (1–6)	Xfinity Center (14,113); College Park, MD
Jan 31; 5:30 pm, ESPNU		Purdue	L 60–68	10–11 (1–7)	Welsh-Ryan Arena (8,117); Evanston, IL
Feb 3; 6:30 pm, BTN		at Nebraska	L 60–76	10–12 (1–8)	Pinnacle Bank Arena (15,482); Lincoln, NE
Feb 7; 4:30 pm, BTN		at No. 5 Wisconsin	L 50–65	10–13 (1–9)	Kohl Center (17,279); Madison, WI
Feb 10; 6:00 pm, BTN		Michigan State	L 44–68	10–14 (1–10)	Welsh-Ryan Arena (7,265); Evanston, IL
Feb 15; 2:00 pm, BTN		Iowa	W 66–61 ^{OT}	11–14 (2–10)	Welsh-Ryan Arena (7,714); Evanston, IL
Feb 18; 8:00 pm, BTN		at Minnesota	W 72–66	12–14 (3–10)	Williams Arena (12,361); Minneapolis, MN
Feb 21; 2:00 pm, ESPNU		Penn State	W 60–39	13–14 (4–10)	Welsh-Ryan Arena (7,317); Evanston, IL
Feb 25; 6:00 pm, BTN		Indiana	W 72–65	14–14 (5–10)	Welsh-Ryan Arena (7,014); Evanston, IL
Feb 28; 6:00 pm, BTN		at Illinois	L 60–86	14–15 (5–11)	State Farm Center (15,471); Champaign, IL
Mar 3; 8:00 pm, BTN		Michigan	W 82–78 ^{2OT}	15–15 (6–11)	Welsh-Ryan Arena (7,673); Evanston, IL
Mar 7; 11:00 am, BTN		at Iowa	L 52–69	15–16 (6–12)	Carver–Hawkeye Arena (15,400); Iowa City, IA
Big Ten tournament
Mar 12; 5:30 pm, ESPN2		vs. Indiana; Second round	L 56–71	15–17	United Center; Chicago, IL
*Non-conference game. ^{#}Rankings from AP Poll. (#) Tournament seedings in parentheses.
