= 2020–21 Northwestern Wildcats men's basketball team =

American college basketball season

2020–21 Northwestern Wildcats men's basketball
- Conference: Big Ten Conference
- Record: 9–15 (6–13 Big Ten)
- Head coach: Chris Collins (8th season)
- Assistant coaches: Brian James; Emanuel Dildy; Jon Borovich
- Home arena: Welsh–Ryan Arena

2020–21 Big Ten Conference men's basketball standings
	Conf.				Overall
Team	W		L	PCT	W		L	PCT
No. 4 Michigan	14	–	3	.824	23	–	5	.821
No. 2 Illinois †	16	–	4	.800	24	–	7	.774
No. 8 Iowa	14	–	6	.700	22	–	9	.710
No. 20 Purdue	13	–	6	.684	18	–	10	.643
No. 7 Ohio State	12	–	8	.600	21	–	10	.677
Wisconsin	10	–	10	.500	18	–	13	.581
Rutgers	10	–	10	.500	16	–	12	.571
Maryland	9	–	11	.450	17	–	14	.548
Michigan State	9	–	11	.450	15	–	13	.536
Indiana	7	–	12	.368	12	–	15	.444
Penn State	7	–	12	.368	11	–	14	.440
Northwestern	6	–	13	.316	9	–	15	.375
Minnesota	6	–	14	.300	14	–	15	.483
Nebraska	3	–	16	.158	7	–	20	.259
† Conference tournament winner Rankings from AP poll

The 2020–21 Northwestern Wildcats men's basketball team represented Northwestern University in the 2020–21 NCAA Division I men's basketball season. They were led by eighth-year head coach Chris Collins, the Wildcats played their home games at Welsh-Ryan Arena in Evanston, Illinois as members of the Big Ten Conference.

== Previous season ==
The Wildcats finished the 2019–20 season 8–22, 3–17 to finish in 13th place in Big Ten play. They lost in the first round of the Big Ten tournament to Minnesota.

== Offseason ==
=== Departures ===
Name	Number	Pos.	Height	Weight	Year	Hometown	Reason for departure
A. J. Turner	21	F	6'7"	200	Rs Sr	Mount Clemens, MI	Graduated
Pat Spencer	12	G	6'3"	205	Grad Student	Davidsonville, MD	Completed athletic eligibility; graduated from Loyola (MD) in 2019

== Roster ==
2020–21 Northwestern Wildcats men's basketball team
Players
Coaches

Pos.	#	Name	Height	Weight	Year	Previous school	Hometown
G	0	Boo Buie	6 ft 2 in (1.88 m)	180 lb (82 kg)	So	Gould Academy	Albany, New York
G	1	Chase Audige	6 ft 4 in (1.93 m)	200 lb (91 kg)	RS So	William & Mary	Coram, New York
G	2	Ryan Greer	6 ft 2 in (1.88 m)	190 lb (86 kg)	Jr	Northfield Mount Hermon	Atlanta, Georgia
G	3	Ty Berry	6 ft 3 in (1.91 m)	190 lb (86 kg)	Fr	Sunrise Christian Academy	Newton, Kansas
F	10	Miller Kopp	6 ft 7 in (2.01 m)	215 lb (98 kg)	Jr	Houston Christian High School	Houston, Texas
G	11	Anthony Gaines	6 ft 4 in (1.93 m)	210 lb (95 kg)	RS Jr	New Hampton School	Kingston, New York
C	15	Ryan Young	6 ft 10 in (2.08 m)	245 lb (111 kg)	RS So	Bethlehem Catholic High School	Stewartsville, New Jersey
F	22	Pete Nance	6 ft 10 in (2.08 m)	225 lb (102 kg)	Jr	Revere High School	Akron, Ohio
F	31	Robbie Beran	6 ft 9 in (2.06 m)	215 lb (98 kg)	So	Collegiate School	Richmond, Virginia
C	34	Matthew Nicholson	7 ft 0 in (2.13 m)	255 lb (116 kg)	Fr	Clarkston High School	Clarkston, Michigan
G	50	Dom Martinelli	6 ft 4 in (1.93 m)	200 lb (91 kg)	Fr	Glenbrook South High School	Glenview, Illinois
G	53	Roy Dixon III (W)	5 ft 11 in (1.8 m)	170 lb (77 kg)	So	Greater Atlanta Christian	Atlanta, Georgia
G	54	Dylan Sandhu (W)	6 ft 4 in (1.93 m)	165 lb (75 kg)	RS So	Detroit Country Day	Northville, Michigan
G	55	Eric Zalewski (W)	6 ft 0 in (1.83 m)	185 lb (84 kg)	RS Jr	Stevenson High School	Buffalo Grove, Illinois

Head coach

- Chris Collins (Duke)

Assistant coach(es)

- Brian James (Illinois State)
- Emanuel Dildy (Eastern Illinois)
- Jon Borovich (Central Michigan)

Legend

- (C) Team captain
- (S) Suspended
- (I) Ineligible
- (W) Walk-on
- Injured
- Current redshirt

Roster
Last update: April 9, 2021

== Schedule and results ==
Date time, TV	Rank^{#}	Opponent^{#}	Result	Record	High points	High rebounds	High assists	Site (attendance) city, state
Regular season
December 2, 2020*; 8:00 pm, BTN		Arkansas–Pine Bluff	W 92–49	1–0	18 – Kopp	7 – Tied	8 – Greer	Welsh–Ryan Arena (0); Evanston, IL
December 5, 2020*; 4:00 pm, BTN		Chicago State	W 111–66	2–0	20 – Audige	12 – Gaines	7 – Buie	Welsh–Ryan Arena (0); Evanston, IL
December 9, 2020*; 8:15 pm, ESPN		Pittsburgh; ACC–Big Ten Challenge	L 70–71	2–1	14 – Buie	7 – Tied	6 – Buie	Welsh–Ryan Arena (0); Evanston, IL
December 13, 2020*; 3:00 pm, ESPNU		SIU Edwardsville	Cancelled due to COVID-19 issues at SIU-Edwardsville					Welsh–Ryan Arena; Evanston, IL
December 15, 2020*; 3:00 pm, BTN+		Quincy	W 100–48	3–1	23 – Kopp	7 – Nance	4 – Tied	Welsh–Ryan Arena (0); Evanston, IL
December 20, 2020; 6:00 pm, BTN		No. 4 Michigan State	W 79–65	4–1 (1–0)	30 – Buie	12 – Nance	4 – Tied	Welsh–Ryan Arena (0); Evanston, IL
December 23, 2020; 7:30 pm, BTN		at Indiana	W 74–67	5–1 (2–0)	17 – Audige	9 – Young	4 – Buie	Assembly Hall (0); Bloomington, IN
December 26, 2020; 1:00 pm, FS1		No. 23 Ohio State	W 71–70	6–1 (3–0)	23 – Kopp	7 – Young	5 – Buie	Welsh–Ryan Arena (0); Evanston, IL
December 29, 2020; 8:00 pm, FS1	No. 19	at No. 10 Iowa	L 72–87	6–2 (3–1)	21 – Nance	6 – Buie	8 – Buie	Carver–Hawkeye Arena (464); Iowa City, IA
January 3, 2021; 6:30 pm, BTN	No. 19	at No. 16 Michigan	L 66-85	6-3 (3-2)	14 – Beran	7 – Young	4 – Buie	Crisler Center (88); Ann Arbor, MI
January 7, 2021; 8:00 pm, BTN		No. 12 Illinois	L 56-81	6-4 (3-3)	11 – Beran	5 – Tied	4 – Beran	Welsh–Ryan Arena (0); Evanston, IL
January 13, 2021; 6:00 pm, BTN		at No. 21 Ohio State	L 71-81	6-5 (3-4)	25 – Audige	9 – Kopp	6 – Buie	Value City Arena (0); Columbus, OH
January 17, 2021; 11:00 am, CBS		No. 5 Iowa	L 73-96	6-6 (3-5)	16 – Nance	9 – Nance	6 – Greer	Welsh–Ryan Arena (0); Evanston, IL
January 20, 2021; 8:00 pm, BTN		at No. 10 Wisconsin	L 52-68	6-7 (3-6)	16 – Audige	12 – Nance	5 – Buie	Kohl Center (0); Madison, WI
January 23, 2021; 6:00 pm, BTN		at Penn State	L 78-81	6-8 (3-7)	19 – Kopp	7 – Nance	4 – Buie	Bryce Jordan Center (273); University Park, PA
January 31, 2021; 6:30 pm, BTN		Rutgers	L 56-64	6-9 (3-8)	15 – Kopp	9 – Nance	3 – Tied	Welsh–Ryan Arena (0); Evanston, IL
February 3, 2021; 8:00 pm, BTN		No. 4 Michigan	Postponed due to COVID-19 issues at Michigan					Welsh–Ryan Arena; Evanston, IL
February 6, 2021; 3:30 pm, BTN		at No. 24 Purdue	L 70-75	6-10 (3-9)	20 – Nance	8 – Nance	6 – Tied	Mackey Arena (250); West Lafayette, IN
February 10, 2021; 4:30 pm, BTN		Indiana	L 76-79 ^{2OT}	6-11 (3-10)	19 – Audige	7 – Nance	5 – Young	Welsh–Ryan Arena (0); Evanston, IL
February 13, 2021; 4:00 pm, BTN		at No. 25 Rutgers	L 50–64	6–12 (3–11)	11 – Tied	7 – Nance	3 – Buie	Rutgers Athletic Center (0); Piscataway, NJ
February 16, 2021; 8:00 pm, BTN		at No. 5 Illinois	L 66–73	6–13 (3–12)	22 – Audige	7 – Gaines	1 – Tied	State Farm Center (162); Champaign, IL
February 21, 2021; 6:00 pm, BTN		No. 21 Wisconsin	L 51–68	6–14 (3–13)	19 – Buie	6 – Gaines	4 – Buie	Welsh–Ryan Arena (0); Evanston, IL
February 25, 2021; 8:00 pm, BTN		at Minnesota	W 67–59	7–14 (4–13)	25 – Buie	8 – Young	4 – Nance	Williams Arena (23); Minneapolis, MN
March 3, 2021; 8:00 pm, BTN		Maryland	W 60–55	8–14 (5–13)	15 – Buie	7 – Young	4 – Greer	Welsh–Ryan Arena (0); Evanston, IL
March 7, 2021; 12:30 pm, BTN		Nebraska	W 79–78	9–14 (6–13)	14 – Audige	7 – Nance	6 – Buie	Welsh–Ryan Arena (0); Evanston, IL
Big Ten tournament
March 10, 2021; 5:30 pm, BTN	(13)	vs. (12) Minnesota; First round	L 46–51	9–15	9 – Kopp	11 – Nance	3 – Buie	Lucas Oil Stadium (5,909); Indianapolis, IN
*Non-conference game. ^{#}Rankings from AP Poll. (#) Tournament seedings in parentheses. All times are in Central Time.

== Rankings ==
Ranking movements Legend: ██ Increase in ranking ██ Decrease in ranking — = Not ranked RV = Received votes
	Week																	
Poll	Pre	1	2	3	4	5	6	7	8	9	10	11	12	13	14	15	16	Final
AP	—	—	—	—	RV	19	RV	RV	—	—	—	—	—	—	—	—	—	Not released
Coaches	—	—	—	—	—	22	RV	—	—	—	—	—	—	—	—	—	—	—

*AP does not release post-NCAA Tournament rankings
^Coaches did not release a Week 1 poll.
