= Jitim Young =

American basketball player (born 1981)

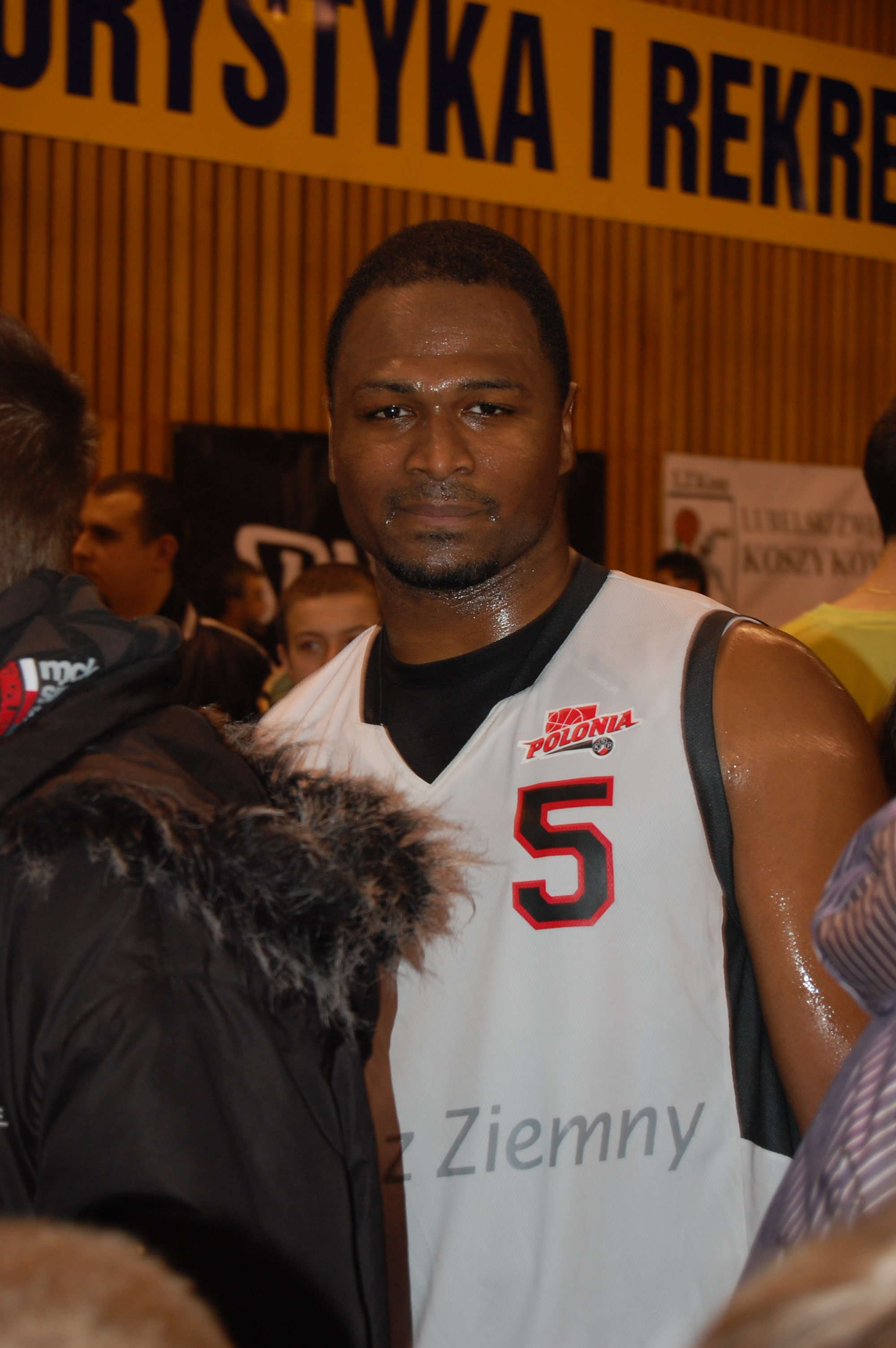

Personal information
- Born: December 19, 1981 (age 44) Chicago, Illinois, U.S.
- Listed height: 6 ft 2 in (1.88 m)
- Listed weight: 190 lb (86 kg)

Career information
- High school: Gordon Tech (Chicago, Illinois)
- College: Northwestern (2000–2004)
- NBA draft: 2004: undrafted
- Playing career: 2004–2012
- Position: Guard

Career history
- 2004: Panellinios BC
- 2005: Dexia Mons-Hainaut
- 2006–2007: Minot SkyRockets
- 2007: Cupes de los Pepines
- 2007–2008: MAFC Budapest
- 2008–2009: Polonia Warsaw
- 2009–2010: Elitzur Ramla
- 2010–2011: Hod HaSharon
- 2011–2012: Ramat Gan

Career highlights
- First-team All-Big Ten (2004)

Jitim Young (born December 19, 1981) is an American basketball player. Young attended Northwestern University and was famous for his play at the collegiate level and as an All-American at Gordon Tech High School.

== High school career ==
Young attended Chicago's Gordon Technical High School, where he averaged 23 points, 7 rebounds and 6 assists per game. He led Gordon Tech into the Illinois state tournament his senior year of 1999–2000 where they advanced to the Elite 8 but were eventually defeated by West Aurora, the eventual state champions. Jitim was named to the Chicago All-area team and gained All-State honors. As a junior Young averaged 18.7 points, 6 rebounds, and 5 assists per game. Young was named to the Chicago All-Area team and All-State.. As a Sophomore Young led Gordon Tech with 14.5 points, to go along with 5 rebounds, and 4.5 assists. Athlons Magazine rated him as one of the top 5 sophomore combo-guards in the country, also made the top 40 in the nation. His senior season he was named a USA Today All-American honorable mention, Street and Smith All-American, and a Blue Ribbon All-American. Young played in the Capital Classic. Jitim Young was also a part of the prestigious Five Star Basketball Camp "Wall of Fame." At 5-star which is scouted by the noted Howard Garfinkle, Young captured 2 all-star MVP awards in the NBA division, sportsmanship award, Best Defensive player, and Young led his team to a championship as a rising sophomore.

In 1998 and 1999, Jitim Young along with University of Illinois basketball star Luther Head won back to back Shoot The Bull National 3X3 Championships. Shoot The Bull was a tournament held in Chicago which was sponsored by the Chicago Bulls NBA Professional Basketball Team.

In 2017 Young was inducted into the Chicago Catholic League (CCL) Hall of Fame, joining a distinguished list of other Chicago Catholic High School Athletic League alums such as Mike Krzyzewski, Donovan McNabb, Johnny Lattner, Corey Maggette, Pete Mackanin, and Ray Meyer.

== College career ==
At Northwestern University Jitim Young was one of the top five freshmen scorers in the Big Ten Conference 2000–01 season. Sophomore year Young was vital in leading the Wildcats to a 16–13 record. He became Male Athlete of The Year at Northwestern, as well as Third Team All Big Ten selection as a junior, and his senior year Young was a First Team All-Big Ten performer and was honored to the All Big Ten tournament Team 2004. Young also made All-Tournament Team at the University of Texas El-Paso Christmas tournament (Sun Classic), and was named to the All-District Team.

Young finished his collegiate career ranked sixth on Northwestern's all-time scoring list with 1,521 points. Also ranks as the school's all-time leader in games started (117), and also ranks second in minutes played (3,849), second in steals (215), tied for second in games played (117), fifth in field goals made (548), sixth in three-point field goals made (108), and tenth in free throws made (317).

He led the team in scoring, rebounding, and steals in his senior (17.9 ppg, 6.0 rpg, 66 steals) and junior seasons (13.4 ppg, 5.1 rpg, 47 steals). Young was the only freshman starting in the Big Ten Conference when he suited up for Northwestern in 2000. He led Northwestern to 8 conference victories in his senior season, the first time since 1968.

Young was the only senior named to the 2004 first-team All-Big Ten as well as the 2004 All-Big Ten tournament team.

After being in magazines such as Sports Illustrated, Athlons Magazine, Street and Smith. Concluding his career that was also an article featuring Young in Slam Magazine.

== Professional career ==
Despite a successful collegiate basketball career at Northwestern University in the Big Ten Conference, Young was not selected in the NBA draft. He participated in several pre-draft camps and workouts, where he received attention for his defensive abilities, athleticism, and work ethic. However, concerns regarding his height (6 ft 2 in) and shooting consistency may have affected his draft prospects.

During the pre-draft process, Young participated in workouts alongside several notable players, including Big Ten rival and eventual NBA draft pick Devin Harris, as well as Andre Iguodala. He also trained at Tim Grover's basketball facility in Chicago, Illinois, where he competed alongside NBA players such as Shawn Marion, Dwyane Wade, Jamal Crawford, and Corey Maggette.

He started the 2004–05 season in Greece, playing in ten games with Panellinios. Averaged 9.8 points and 4.0 rebounds. He moved on to Dexia Mons-Hainaut in the Belgian League, averaging 12.6 points and 4.0 rebounds in 21 games. Young Led Mons to the Final Four in the Belgium league playoffs. In 2006–07 Young played for the CBA's Minot Skyrockets in all 47 games averaging 14.8 points, 5.0 rebounds, 7.8 assists and 2.5 steals. Young Led Minot to the second-best record in the league. He has since signed with a team from the Dominican Republic where he played for the team in the finals. He will play the 2007–08 for MAFC Budapest in the Hungary League.

In 2012–13 Young worked as color commentator for WGN Radio covering Northwestern University basketball games. In 2014 Young was named Most Valuable Player in the USA Basketball 3X3 National Team qualifications. Alongside teammate Arne Duncan Secretary of Education Team Ariel defeated Team Denver, 21–20. Young got the opportunity to represent USA Basketball in Russia. He is in the process of completing his first book Monologues Of A Good Man.

=== Teams ===
- 2004–05 Phoenix Suns Summer league, Panellinois Greece (Athens)/ Belgium Dexia Mons.
- 2005–06 San Antonio Spurs mini camp, Chicago Bulls (preseason) Veterans Camp. Young sustained an injury sidelining him the entire year.
- 2006–07 CBA: Minot SkyRockets, Dominican Republic Cupes (Santiago)
- 2007–08 Hungary (Budapest) MAFC Young was named All Hungarian honorable mention team averaging 20 points 5 rebounds 5 assists and 4 steals
- 2008–09 Polonia Warsaw (Poland)
- 2009–10 Elitzer Ramle (Israel) 18 pts 6 rebs 6 asst 3 stls
- 2010–11 Hod HaSharon (Israel) 22.0 pts 5.8 rebs 5.1 asst 2.7 stls
- 2011–12 Ramat Gan (Israel)

== United States 3x3 national team ==
In 2014, Young was named MVP in Colorado Springs, Colorado and he was selected to the United States 3x3 national team for the 2014 FIBA 3x3 World Championship. The United States finished in 14th place with a 2–4 record. In 2015, 2016, and 2018, Young has competed in the semi-finals for the USA National Qualification Tournament in Colorado, Springs. Young is one of the best 3X3 players in the country.
