= Craig Moore (basketball) =

American basketball player

Personal information
- Born: September 8, 1987 (age 39) Doylestown, Pennsylvania
- Listed height: 6 ft 4 in (1.93 m)
- Listed weight: 185 lb (84 kg)

Career information
- High school: Lawrenceville School (Lawrenceville, New Jersey)
- College: Northwestern (2005–2009)
- NBA draft: 2009: undrafted
- Playing career: 2009–2012
- Position: Shooting guard
- Coaching career: 2011–2013

Career history

Playing
- 2009–2010: Aris Leeuwarden
- 2011–2012: CSM Mediaș

Coaching
- 2011: Princeton (assistant)
- 2012–2013: Northwestern (assistant)

Career highlights
- Big Ten All-Freshman Team (2006)

Craig Moore (born September 8, 1987) is an American basketball player who is currently a member of Princeton 3x3 in the FIBA 3x3 World Tour.

== High school ==
Moore was a four-year letter winner and was team captain his senior at the Lawrenceville School in Lawrenceville, New Jersey. He finished his prep career with 171 3-pointers and earned all-state honors following his sophomore and junior years.

== College career ==
Moore played college basketball at Northwestern University from 2005 to 2009. He was named to the Big Ten All-Freshman team following the 2005–06 season when he averaged 6.8 points and 2.3 assists per game, and finished second on the team with 54 3-pointers. He was named honorable mention All-Big Ten in 2007–08 after leading the Big Ten in made 3-pointers per game (3.23), while setting a school record 97 of them in the season. Moore was named a consensus third-team All-Big Ten selection his senior year. He broke his own school record with 110 3-pointers, finishing his career with 320, fourth all-time in Big Ten history.

=== Career stats ===
Season	School	G	FG	FGA	FG%	2P%	3P	3PA	3P%	FT	FTA	FT%	REB	AST	STL	BLK	PF	PTS
2005–06	Northwestern	29	66	171	.386	.632	54	152	.355	11	13	.846	54	68	18	2	44	197
2006–07	Northwestern	31	83	226	.367	.522	59	180	.328	26	35	.743	56	63	27	4	53	251
2007–08	Northwestern	30	138	312	.442	.586	97	242	.401	29	35	.829	87	93	55	7	70	402
2008–09	Northwestern	31	142	336	.423	.492	110	271	.406	50	63	.794	99	84	41	8	73	444
Career	Northwestern	121	429	1045	.411	.545	320	845	.379	116	146	.795	296	308	141	21	240	1294

== Coaching career ==
Moore served as an assistant coach for Princeton University in 2011, and for Northwestern during the 2012–13 season. In 2014, Moore was named Director of Basketball Operations for Princeton University men's team.

== Professional career ==
Moore played for De Friesland Aris in the Netherlands (2009–2010); and for Gaz Metan Medias in Romania (2011–2012). He currently is a member of Princeton 3x3, and is a 3-time National Champion (2014, 2017, 2018) in 3x3 basketball, having competed in two 3x3 World Cups (2014, 2017).
