= Pat Baldwin (basketball) =

American basketball player and coach

Current position
- Title: Assistant coach
- Team: San Diego Toreros
- Conference: West Coast Conference

Biographical details
- Born: August 22, 1972 (age 54)

Playing career
- 1990–1994: Northwestern
- 1999–2000: HKK Brotnjo
- 2000–2001: KK Zadar
- Position: Point guard

Coaching career (HC unless noted)
- 2001–2002: Lincoln (MO) (assistant)
- 2002–2004: Green Bay (assistant)
- 2004–2011: Loyola (IL) (assistant)
- 2011–2013: Missouri State (assistant)
- 2013–2017: Northwestern (assistant)
- 2017–2022: Milwaukee
- 2022–2023: Georgetown (assistant)
- 2023–2026: Valparaiso (assistant)
- 2026-present: San Diego (assistant)

Head coaching record
- Overall: 57–92

Accomplishments and honors

Awards
- Big Ten Defensive Player of the Year (1994)

Patrick O'Neal Baldwin Sr. (born August 22, 1972) is an American assistant college basketball coach for the San Diego Toreros. He previously served as the head coach of the Milwaukee Panthers basketball team, and an assistant coach for Valparaiso, Georgetown, Northwestern, Missouri State, Loyola (IL), Green Bay, and Lincoln (MO). He played college basketball for the Northwestern Wildcats, and played professionally in Bosnia and Croatia. As a player, he twice led the Big Ten in steals and once did so in free throw percentage. He is the father of first round NBA draftee Patrick Baldwin Jr.

== Early life ==
He is a native of Leavenworth, Kansas and attended Leavenworth High School.

== Playing career ==
He was a standout basketball player for Northwestern from 1990 to 1994. He still ranks first in school history with 272 career steals, second all-time with 452 assists and 20th with 1,189 points. His 90 steals as a freshman in 1990–91 are the school's single-season record, while his 154 assists as a senior in 1993–94 rank third in school history. In the 1990–91 and 1992–93 seasons he led the Big Ten Conference in steals. In 1992–93 he led the Big Ten in free throw percentage. His 9-steal game on November 27, 1990 against Oakland earned him a share of the Big Ten single-game record until Michael Finley achieved 10 in double-overtime on February 13, 1993. He was the 1993–94 Big Ten Defensive Player of the Year. Baldwin's 14 single-game assists for the the 1992–93 Wildcats against Youngstown State on December 14, 1992 stood as the team record until surpassed by Bryant McIntosh on January 10, 2018 with 16 for the the 2017–18 team.

Baldwin played professionally in Bosnia for HKK Brotnjo and Croatia for KK Zadar, averaging 18 points, 2 assists and 3 steals per game.

== Coaching career ==
Baldwin began his coaching career as an assistant at Lincoln (MO) during the 2001–02 season. He joined Tod Kowalczyk's staff at Green Bay from 2002 to 2004. Baldwin was an assistant coach at Loyola (IL) from 2004 to 2011, followed by a two-year stint as an assistant at Missouri State. Baldwin served as an assistant coach at Northwestern from 2013 to 2017. He was named the head coach of UW–Milwaukee on June 20, 2017, signing a five-year deal. Baldwin replaced LaVall Jordan, who accepted the head coaching position at Butler. His son Patrick Baldwin Jr., a five-star recruit, committed to play at Milwaukee under his father in 2021.

Baldwin was dismissed as head coach at Milwaukee on March 2, 2022 at the conclusion of the school's fifth straight losing season. He finished with an overall record of 57–92 and a 34–59 mark in Horizon League competition.

On June 16, 2022, media reporting indicated that Georgetown had hired Baldwin as an assistant coach for the 2022–23 season.

He was announced as a member of Roger Powell's new coaching staff at Valparaiso on April 19, 2023.

Baldwin signed with Athletes Untapped as a private basketball and mental performance coach on April 8, 2025.

On March 27, 2026, he was hired as an assistant coach to JR Blount for San Diego Toreros men's basketball.

== Head coaching record ==
Record table
Season	Team	Overall	Conference	Standing	Postseason
Milwaukee Panthers (Horizon League) (2017–2022)
2017–18	Milwaukee	16–17	8–10	T–5th	
2018–19	Milwaukee	9–22	4–14	10th	
2019–20	Milwaukee	12–19	7–11	T–7th	
2020–21	Milwaukee	10–12	7–10	8th	
2021–22	Milwaukee	10–22	8–14	9th	
Milwaukee:		57–92 (.383)	34–59 (.366)		
Total:		57–92 (.383)			

== Personal life ==
Baldwin is married to former Northwestern volleyball player Shawn Baldwin (née Karey). They have four children together: Patrick Jr., Tatum, Brooke and Claire.

== See also ==
- Northwestern Wildcats men's basketball statistical leaders
