= Boo Buie =

American basketball player (born 1999)

- Buie with Körfez Basket in 2026

No. 0 – Biotekno Körfez Basket
- Position: Point guard / shooting guard
- League: Basketbol Süper Ligi

Personal information
- Born: December 7, 1999 (age 26) Albany, New York, U.S.
- Listed height: 6 ft 2 in (1.88 m)
- Listed weight: 180 lb (82 kg)

Career information
- High school: Troy (Troy, New York); Gould Academy (Bethel, Maine)
- College: Northwestern (2019–2024)
- NBA draft: 2024: undrafted
- Playing career: 2024–present

Career history
- 2024–2025: Westchester Knicks
- 2025–2026: Mexico City Capitanes
- 2026: Xinjiang Flying Tigers
- 2026–present: Körfez Basket

Career highlights
- NBA G League Winter Showcase champion (2024); Lefty Driesell Award (2024); 2× First-team All-Big Ten (2023, 2024)
- Stats at NBA.com
- Stats at Basketball Reference

Daniel Richard "Boo" Buie III (born December 7, 1999) is an American professional basketball player for Körfez Basket of the Basketbol Süper Ligi (BSL). He played college basketball for the Northwestern Wildcats of the Big Ten Conference, where he set the school career scoring record.

== Early life and high school career ==
Buie grew up in Albany, New York, and initially attended Troy High School. He transferred to Gould Academy in Bethel, Maine after his sophomore year. Buie averaged 27 points, six rebounds, five assists, and three steals per game in his first season at Gould. Buie committed to playing college basketball for Northwestern over offers from St. Bonaventure, UMass, Boston University, and Siena.

== College career ==
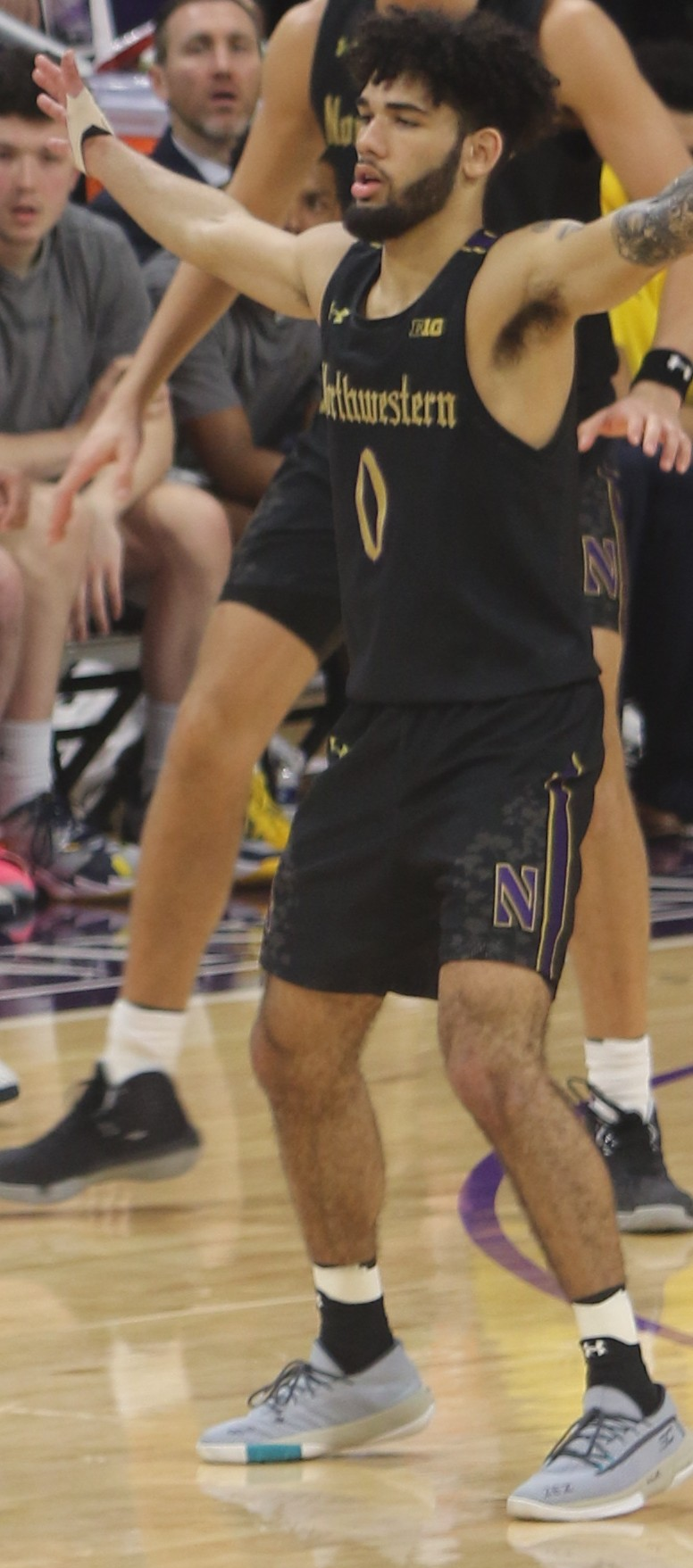
Buie defending the perimeter for Northwestern against Michigan on February 12, 2020

Buie played in 26 games with 11 starts during his freshman season at Northwestern, averaging 10.3 points per game and finishing second on the team with 63 assists and 17 steals. As a sophomore, he averaged 10.3 points per game as a sophomore and led the Wildcats with 41 three-pointers made and 96 assists. Buie averaged 14.1 points, 4.3 assists, and 2.5 rebounds per game during his junior season. As a senior, he was named first-team All-Big Ten Conference and to the second team by the league's coaches. Buie averaged 17.3 points, 4.5 assists, and 3.4 rebounds per game during his senior season.

Buie declared to return for a fifth season at Northwestern on May 8, 2023. On February 15, 2024, Buie scored his 2,000th career point against Rutgers. One week later, on February 22, he surpassed John Shurna (2,038 points) as Northwestern's all-time leading scorer. Buie declared for the 2024 NBA Draft after a second-round exit from the 2024 NCAA Division I men's basketball tournament.

== Professional career ==
=== Westchester Knicks (2024–2025) ===
After going undrafted in the 2024 NBA draft, Buie joined the Phoenix Suns for the 2024 NBA Summer League and on October 7, 2024, he signed with the New York Knicks. However, he was waived two days later and on October 28, joined the Westchester Knicks. On November 5, he signed a two-way contract with New York, but was waived on December 24, after playing only for Westchester. Three days later, he returned to Westchester.

=== Mexico City Capitanes (2025–2026) ===
On August 25, 2025, Buie was traded from the Westchester Knicks to the Mexico City Capitanes in exchange for Dink Pate.

=== Körfez Basket (2026–present) ===
On August 5, 2026, Buie signed with Körfez Basket of the Basketbol Süper Ligi (BSL).

== Career statistics ==
Legend
GP	Games played	GS	Games started	MPG	Minutes per game
FG%	Field goal percentage	3P%	3-point field goal percentage	FT%	Free throw percentage
RPG	Rebounds per game	APG	Assists per game	SPG	Steals per game
BPG	Blocks per game	PPG	Points per game	**Bold**	Career high

=== College ===
Year	Team	GP	GS	MPG	FG%	3P%	FT%	RPG	APG	SPG	BPG	PPG
2019–20	Northwestern	26	11	25.0	.376	.282	.708	2.1	2.4	.7	**.1**	10.3
2020–21	Northwestern	24	19	26.9	.369	.360	.782	2.3	4.0	.6	.0	10.3
2021–22	Northwestern	31	30	29.5	.397	.341	.796	2.5	4.3	.8	**.1**	14.1
2022–23	Northwestern	**34**	**34**	34.9	.406	.318	**.869**	**3.4**	4.5	1.1	**.1**	17.3
2023–24	Northwestern	31	31	**36.6**	**.441**	**.431**	.847	**3.4**	**5.2**	**1.3**	**.1**	**18.9**
Career		146	125	31.0	.405	.350	.818	2.8	4.2	.9	.1	14.6

== Personal life ==
Buie's half-brother, Talor Battle, played college basketball at Penn State and professionally overseas. Talor Battle joined the Northwestern's men's basketball program as an assistant coach in May 2021, staying with Buie's team for his final three seasons before leaving Northwestern. In June 2024, he was named to Ohio State's coaching staff and in 2025 returned to his alma mater on Penn State's staff.

== See also ==
- List of NCAA Division I men's basketball career scoring leaders
