= Bryant McIntosh =

American basketball player (born 1994)

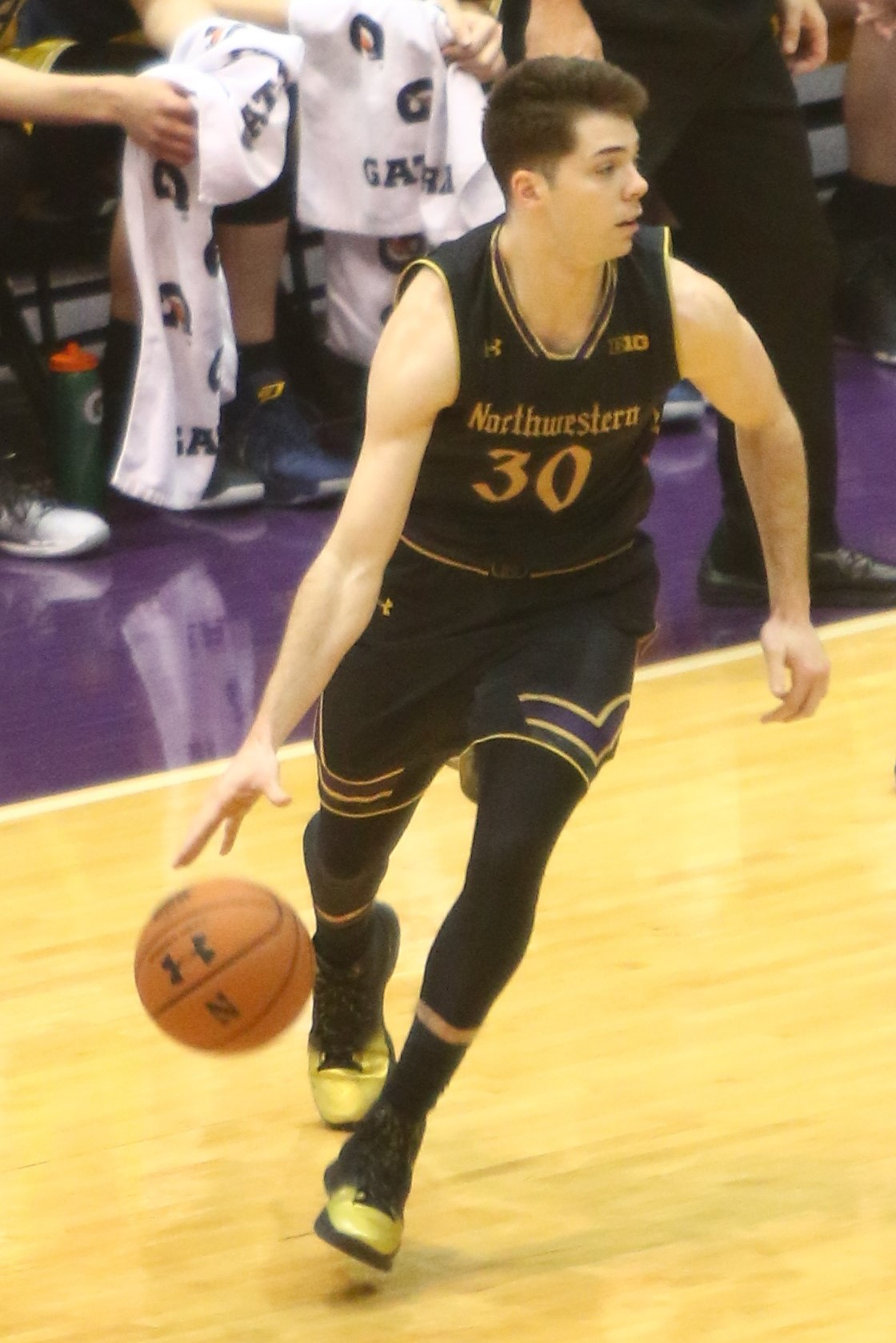
- McIntosh in 2017 for the 2016–17 Northwestern Wildcats

Northwestern Wildcats
- Position: Assistant coach
- League: Big Ten Conference

Personal information
- Born: November 20, 1994 (age 31) Greensburg, Indiana, U.S.
- Listed height: 6 ft 3 in (1.91 m)
- Listed weight: 200 lb (91 kg)

Career information
- High school: New Castle (New Castle, Indiana); Greensburg (Greensburg, Indiana)
- College: Northwestern (2014–2018)
- NBA draft: 2018: undrafted
- Playing career: 2018–2019

Career history

Playing
- 2018–2019: Leuven Bears

Coaching
- 2019–2022: Northwestern (assistant DBO)
- 2022–present: Northwestern (assistant)

Career highlights
- Second-team All-Big Ten (2017); Big Ten All-Freshman team (2015)

Bryant McIntosh (born November 20, 1994) is an American basketball coach and former player who is currently an assistant coach for the Northwestern Wildcats of the Big Ten Conference. He also played college basketball for Northwestern, and holds the school's single-game, single-season, and career assist records. He was a 2017 All-Big Ten team second-team selection and led the 2016–17 Northwestern Wildcats to the first NCAA tournament in school history.

== Early life ==
McIntosh attended New Castle High School in Indiana as a freshman and Greensburg Community High School for his sophomore through senior seasons. In January 2013, he committed to play for Indiana State. McIntosh led Greensburg to the 2013 IHSAA 3A championship over Concordia Lutheran High School with 25 points, including a 3-point shot in the final 30 seconds of regulation of a 73–70 overtime win. He later decommitted and received offers from Dayton, Purdue, Vanderbilt and Xavier before committing to Northwestern in September 2013. McIntosh led Greensburg to the 2014 IHSAA 3A championship over Thea Bowman Leadership Academy with an IHSAA 3A finals record 11 assists.

== College career ==
As a freshman for the 2014–15 Northwestern Wildcats, he was named to the 2015 All-Big Ten Freshman team. As a sophomore for the 2015–16 Northwestern Wildcats, he set the school single-season assist record (213), surpassing Tim Doyle's total of 157 set 10 years earlier. He was recognized as a 2016 All-Big Ten team honorable selection by the coaches and the media.

As a junior, he served as a co-captain for the 2016–17 Northwestern Wildcats. That season, Northwestern set a school record for wins, and he set the school career assist record, surpassing Juice Thompson. He was recognized as a 2017 All-Big Ten team 2nd team selection by the coaches and the media. McIntosh was one of ten Big Ten players honored as All-District selections by the United States Basketball Writers Association. The 2016–17 Wildcats set a school record for wins and earned the school's first NCAA Division I men's basketball tournament bid in school history. In the first round of the 2017 NCAA tournament, McIntosh led Northwestern to a 68–66 victory over Vanderbilt with 25 points, including the game-winning free throws with 14.6 seconds remaining, for the schools first tournament win.

As a senior, McIntosh was selected to the preseason All-Big Ten team. He was also on the preseason watch lists for the John R. Wooden Award and the Bob Cousy Award. On January 10, McIntosh established the Northwestern single-game assist record by posting 16 against Minnesota, surpassing Patrick Baldwin's 14 from 1992.

== Professional career ==
After going undrafted in the 2018 NBA draft, McIntosh signed with the New Orleans Pelicans for the 2018 NBA Summer League. He signed with the Leuven Bears of the Belgian Pro Basketball League on September 8, 2018. In April 2019 McIntosh left the Leuven Bears.

== Post-playing career ==
After one season of professional basketball in Belgium, McIntosh returned to Northwestern as assistant director of basketball operations. Prior to the 2022–23 season, McIntosh was elevated to the role of assistant coach.

== Personal life ==
McIntosh's cousin is Trey Ball.

== See also ==
- Northwestern Wildcats men's basketball statistical leaders
