= Chris Collins (basketball) =

American basketball player and coach (born 1974)

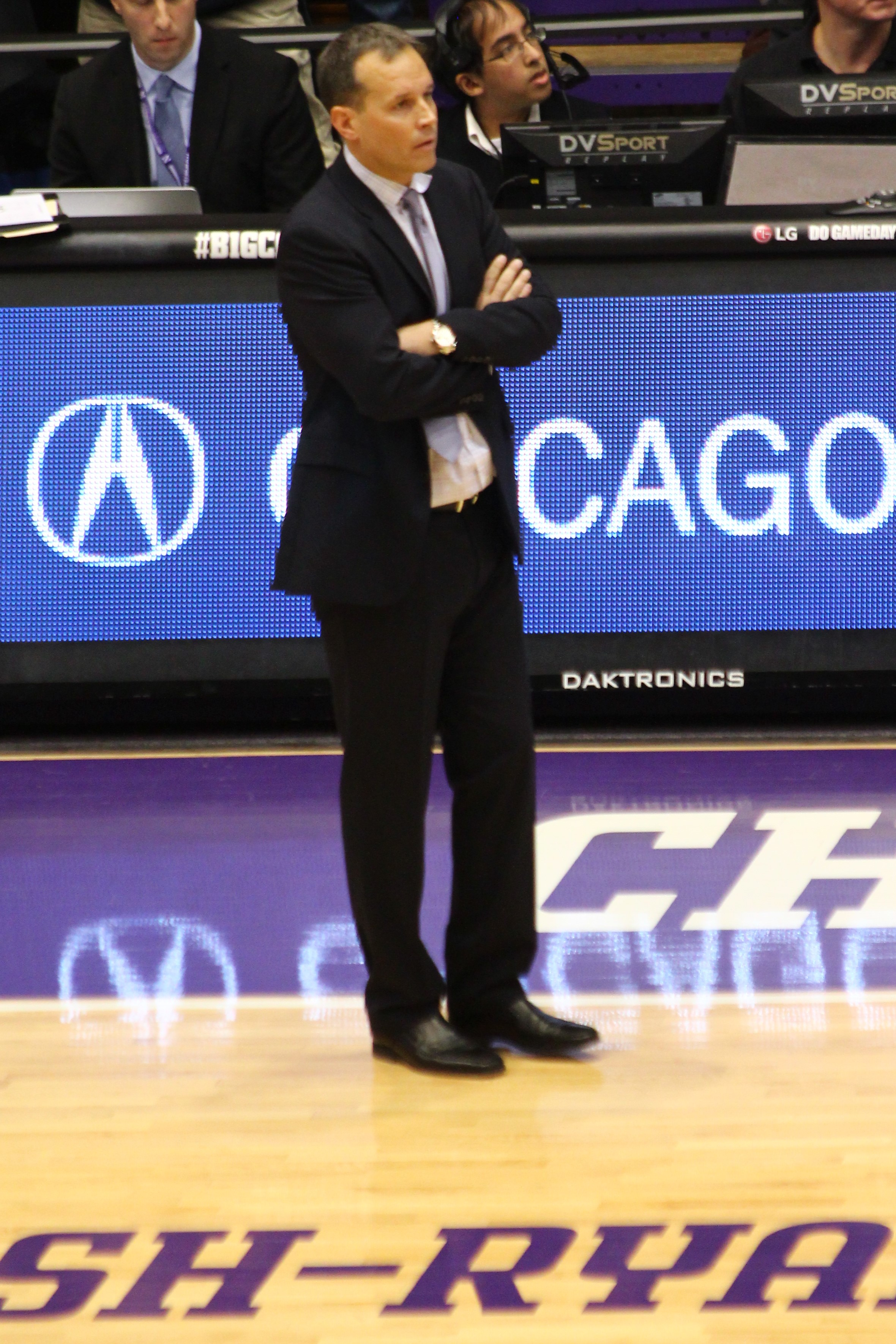
- Collins coaching Northwestern in March 2015

Current position
- Title: Head coach
- Team: Northwestern
- Conference: Big Ten
- Record: 213–212 (.501)
- Annual salary: $2.8 million

Biographical details
- Born: April 19, 1974 (age 52)

Playing career
- 1992–1996: Duke
- Position: Guard

Coaching career (HC unless noted)
- 1998: Detroit Shock (assistant)
- 1998–2000: Seton Hall (assistant)
- 2000–2013: Duke (assistant)
- 2013–present: Northwestern

Head coaching record
- Overall: 213–212 (.501)
- Tournaments: 3–3 (NCAA Division I)

Accomplishments and honors

Awards
- As player: Second-team All-ACC (1996); Illinois Mr. Basketball (1992); McDonald's All-American (1992); As coach: Jim Phelan Award (2023); Big Ten Coach of the Year (2023)

Christopher Ryan Collins (born April 19, 1974) is an American basketball coach who is currently the head men's coach at Northwestern University. Collins previously served as associate head coach of the Duke University men's basketball team and is the son of National Basketball Association (NBA) player, coach, and commentator Doug Collins.

== Playing career ==
At Glenbrook North High School in Northbrook, Illinois, Collins played on the varsity basketball team and won Illinois Mr. Basketball and McDonald's All American honors. After high school, he went on to play at Duke University. Collins received many honors for his play at Duke and was named to the All-ACC rookie team as a freshman in 1993. During his senior year, he was team captain, named Second Team All-ACC and also was awarded the Swett-Baylin Memorial Trophy, which is a trophy for Duke's MVP.

After graduating from Duke, he played professional basketball in Finland for two years.

== Coaching career ==
Collins returned to the United States and became an assistant coach in the Women's National Basketball Association (WNBA) for the Detroit Shock for one year under head coach Nancy Lieberman; and at Seton Hall for two years under head coach Tommy Amaker. In 2000, he returned to his alma mater at Duke under Mike Krzyzewski as an assistant coach and was promoted to associate coach in the summer of 2008.

He was instrumental in Duke's signing of Jon Scheyer, a fellow Glenbrook North Mr. Basketball winner (2006), who, like Collins, had also considered attending Illinois. Scheyer, who Collins was key in luring to Duke, became head coach of the Blue Devils with Mike Krzyzewski's retirement following the 2021–2022 season.

=== Northwestern ===
When Bill Carmody was fired as head coach of Northwestern in March 2013, Collins was immediately mentioned as a primary target. Collins' hiring was announced March 27, 2013. After three years of gradual improvement, the 2016–17 season saw Collins lead the Wildcats to their best season since before World War II. The Wildcats finished with their first winning Big Ten Conference record in 49 years, earned their first NCAA Tournament appearance in school history, and went on to win their first NCAA Tournament game. Northwestern had been the only member of a power conference to have never made the tournament.

Following the season, Northwestern struggled to capitalize on their tournament run, in part because of renovations to Welsh–Ryan Arena that forced the team to play at Allstate Arena, 13 miles to the west of Northwestern's campus. The team finished 10th in the conference in the 2017–18 season, and last in 2018–19. Despite those struggles, Collins was able to land Pete Nance, the highest-rated recruit in Northwestern history, who would begin play as a freshman in the 18–19 season.

Struggles throughout the next few seasons would result in calls for Collins to be fired. At the conclusion of the 2021–22 season, Northwestern athletic director Derrick Gragg publicly stated that he had tasked Collins with "making necessary changes" to improve the team.

Ahead of the 2022–23 season, expectations for Northwestern were low, with many expecting that the departure of key pieces from the last year's team, power forward Pete Nance for North Carolina and center Ryan Young for Duke, would result in a bottom-two finish in the conference.

However, Collins led the Wildcats to twelve conference wins, the most for Northwestern since 1931, and the second NCAA tournament berth in program history. They also finished in a tie for second place in Big Ten play, their highest since the 1958-59 season. Collins's decision to bring in assistant coach Chris Lowery and revamp the team's defensive approach was widely credited with turning the team around. Beyond the NCAA tournament appearance, where the Wildcats would again advance to the Round of 32, Collins also coached Northwestern to their first win over the No. 1 team in the AP Poll, when the Wildcats defeated Purdue in Evanston.

In the first conference game of the 2023–2024 season, Collins and Northwestern would again upset No. 1 ranked Purdue in Evanston, this time in overtime.

Following the end of the 2024-25 season, Collins signed a contract extension through 2030.

== Head coaching record ==
Record table
Season	Team	Overall	Conference	Standing	Postseason
Northwestern Wildcats (Big Ten Conference) (2013–present)
2013–14	Northwestern	14–19	6–12	T–10th	
2014–15	Northwestern	15–17	6–12	T–10th	
2015–16	Northwestern	20–12	8–10	9th	
2016–17	Northwestern	24–12	10–8	T–5th	NCAA Division I Round of 32
2017–18	Northwestern	15–17	6–12	10th	
2018–19	Northwestern	13–19	4–16	14th	
2019–20	Northwestern	8–23	3–17	13th	
2020–21	Northwestern	9–15	6–13	12th	
2021–22	Northwestern	15–16	7–13	T–10th	
2022–23	Northwestern	22–12	12–8	T–2nd	NCAA Division I Round of 32
2023–24	Northwestern	22–12	12–8	T–3rd	NCAA Division I Round of 32
2024–25	Northwestern	17–16	7–13	T-12th	
2025–26	Northwestern	15–19	5–15	T-15th	
2026–27	Northwestern	4–3	0–0		
Northwestern:		213–212 (.501)	92–157 (.369)		
Total:		213–212 (.501)			

Awards and achievements
Preceded by Howard Nathan	Illinois Mr. Basketball Award Winner; 1992	Succeeded by Rashard Griffith
