= 2022–23 Ohio State Buckeyes men's basketball team =

American college basketball season

2022–23 Ohio State Buckeyes men's basketball
- Conference: Big Ten Conference
- Record: 16–19 (5–15 Big Ten)
- Head coach: Chris Holtmann (6th season)
- Associate head coach: Jake Diebler (4th season)
- Assistant coaches: Jack Owens (1st season); Mike Netti (1st season)
- Home arena: Value City Arena

2022–23 Big Ten Conference men's basketball standings
	Conf.				Overall
Team	W		L	PCT	W		L	PCT
No. 3 Purdue †	15	–	5	.750	29	–	6	.829
No. 21 Indiana	12	–	8	.600	23	–	12	.657
Northwestern	12	–	8	.600	22	–	12	.647
Michigan State	11	–	8	.579	21	–	13	.618
Maryland	11	–	9	.550	22	–	13	.629
Illinois	11	–	9	.550	20	–	13	.606
Iowa	11	–	9	.550	19	–	14	.576
Michigan	11	–	9	.550	18	–	16	.529
Penn State	10	–	10	.500	23	–	14	.622
Rutgers	10	–	10	.500	19	–	15	.559
Wisconsin	9	–	11	.450	20	–	15	.571
Nebraska	9	–	11	.450	16	–	16	.500
Ohio State	5	–	15	.250	16	–	19	.457
Minnesota	2	–	17	.105	9	–	22	.290
† Conference tournament winner Rankings from AP poll

The 2022–23 Ohio State Buckeyes men's basketball team represented The Ohio State University in the 2022–23 NCAA Division I men's basketball season. Their head coach was Chris Holtmann, who was in his sixth season with the Buckeyes. The Buckeyes played their home games at Value City Arena in Columbus, Ohio as members of the Big Ten Conference. They finished the season 16–19, 5–15 in Big Ten play to finish in 13th place. They defeated Wisconsin, Iowa, and Michigan State in the Big Ten tournament to advance to the semifinals. There they lost to Purdue.

== Previous season ==
The Buckeyes finished the 2021–22 season 20–12, 12–8 in Big Ten play to finish a three-way tie for fifth place. As the No. 6 seed in the Big Ten tournament, they lost to Penn State in the quarterfinals. They received an at-large bid to the NCAA tournament as the No. 7 seed in the South region where they defeated in Loyola in the First Round before losing to Villanova in the Second Round.

== Offseason ==
=== Departures ===
Name	Number	Pos.	Height	Weight	Year	Hometown	Reason for departure
Meechie Johnson Jr.	0	G	6'2"	172	Sophomore	Cleveland, OH	Transferred to South Carolina
Jimmy Sotos	1	G	6'3"	200	GS Senior	Elk Grove Village, IL	Graduated
Cedric Russell	2	G	6'2"	190	Senior	Alexandria, LA	Graduated
Justin Ahrens	10	F	6'6"	195	Senior	Versailles, OH	Transferred to Loyola Marymount
Malaki Branham	22	G	6'5"	180	Freshman	Columbus, OH	Declare for 2022 NBA draft
Kyle Young	25	F	6'8"	225	GS Senior	Canton, OH	Graduated
Seth Towns	31	F	6'8"	230	GS Senior	Columbus, OH	Left the team for personal reasons
E. J. Liddell	32	F	6'7"	240	Junior	Belleville, IL	Declare for 2022 NBA draft
Harrison Hookfin	42	F	6'6"	195	Senior	Cincinnati, OH	Walk-on; left the team for personal reasons
Joey Brunk	50	C	6'11'	255	GS Senior	Indianapolis, IN	Left the team for personal reasons
Jamari Wheeler	55	G	6'1"	170	GS Senior	Live Oak, FL	Graduated

=== Incoming transfers ===
Name	Number	Pos.	Height	Weight	Year	Hometown	Previous School
Tanner Holden	0	G	6'6"	185	Senior	Wheelersburg, OH	Wright State
Sean McNeil	4	G	6'3"	205	GS Senior	Union, KY	West Virginia
Isaac Likekele	13	G	6'5"	215	GS Senior	Arlington, TX	Oklahoma State
Owen Spencer	44	F	6'9"	205	Junior	Cincinnati, OH	The Citadel

=== Recruiting classes ===
==== 2022 recruiting class ====
College recruiting information
Name	Hometown	School	Height	Weight	Commit date
Roddy Gayle Jr. SG	Mount Pleasant, UT	Wasatch Academy (UT)	6 ft 4 in (1.93 m)	195 lb (88 kg)	Nov 13, 2020
Roddy Gayle Jr. SG	Recruit ratings: Rivals: 247Sports: ESPN: (87)				
Bowen Hardman; SG	Cincinnati, OH	Princeton (OH)	6 ft 3 in (1.91 m)	160 lb (73 kg)	May 13, 2020
Bowen Hardman; SG	Recruit ratings: Rivals: 247Sports: ESPN: (82)				
Felix Okpara; C	Branson, MO	Link Year Prep (MO)	6 ft 11 in (2.11 m)	210 lb (95 kg)	Jul 20, 2021
Felix Okpara; C	Recruit ratings: Rivals: 247Sports: ESPN: (85)				
Brice Sensabaugh; SF	Orlando, FL	Lake Highland Prep (FL)	6 ft 6 in (1.98 m)	240 lb (110 kg)	Sep 29, 2021
Brice Sensabaugh; SF	Recruit ratings: Rivals: 247Sports: ESPN: (82)				
Bruce Thornton; PG	Alpharetta, GA	Milton (GA)	6 ft 2 in (1.88 m)	195 lb (88 kg)	Nov 26, 2020
Bruce Thornton; PG	Recruit ratings: Rivals: 247Sports: ESPN: (86)				
Overall recruit ranking:
Note: In many cases, Scout, Rivals, 247Sports, On3, and ESPN may conflict in their listings of height and weight.; In these cases, the average was taken. ESPN grades are on a 100-point scale.; Sources: "2022 Team Ranking". Rivals.

==== 2023 recruiting class ====
College recruiting information (2023)
Name	Hometown	School	Height	Weight	Commit date
Scotty Middleton; SF	Miami, FL	Sunrise Christian Academy	6 ft 6 in (1.98 m)	195 lb (88 kg)	Aug 7, 2022
Scotty Middleton; SF	Recruit ratings: Rivals: 247Sports: ESPN: (91)				
Devin Royal; PF	Pickerington, OH	Pickerington Central High School	6 ft 6 in (1.98 m)	215 lb (98 kg)	Aug 3, 2022
Devin Royal; PF	Recruit ratings: Rivals: 247Sports: ESPN: (85)				
Scotty Middleton; SF	Miami, FL	Sunrise Christian Academy	6 ft 7 in (2.01 m)	190 lb (86 kg)	Aug 7, 2022
Scotty Middleton; SF	Recruit ratings: Rivals: 247Sports: ESPN: (88)				
Austin Parks; C	Saint Marys, OH	Memorial High School	6 ft 10 in (2.08 m)	230 lb (100 kg)	Feb 13, 2022
Austin Parks; C	Recruit ratings: Rivals: 247Sports: ESPN: (81)				
Overall recruit ranking:
Note: In many cases, Scout, Rivals, 247Sports, On3, and ESPN may conflict in their listings of height and weight.; In these cases, the average was taken. ESPN grades are on a 100-point scale.; Sources: "2023 Team Ranking". Rivals.

== Roster ==
2022–23 Ohio State Buckeyes men's basketball team
Players
Coaches

Pos.	#	Name	Height	Weight	Year	Previous school	Hometown
G	0	Tanner Holden	6 ft 6 in (1.98 m)	200 lb (91 kg)	Sr	Wright State	Wheelersburg, Ohio
G	1	Roddy Gayle Jr.	6 ft 4 in (1.93 m)	205 lb (93 kg)	Fr	Wasatch Academy	Niagara Falls, New York
G	2	Bruce Thornton	6 ft 2 in (1.88 m)	215 lb (98 kg)	Fr	Milton HS	Alpharetta, Georgia
G	3	Eugene Brown III	6 ft 6 in (1.98 m)	195 lb (88 kg)	Jr	Southwest DeKalb HS	Conyers, Georgia
G	4	Sean McNeil	6 ft 4 in (1.93 m)	205 lb (93 kg)	GS	West Virginia	Union, Kentucky
F	10	Brice Sensabaugh	6 ft 6 in (1.98 m)	235 lb (107 kg)	Fr	Lake Highland Prep	Orlando, Florida
G	13	Isaac Likekele	6 ft 5 in (1.96 m)	215 lb (98 kg)	GS	Oklahoma State	Arlington, Texas
F	14	Justice Sueing	6 ft 7 in (2.01 m)	215 lb (98 kg)	RS Sr	California	Honolulu, Hawaii
G	15	Bowen Hardman	6 ft 3 in (1.91 m)	175 lb (79 kg)	Fr	Princeton HS	Cincinnati, Ohio
F	23	Zed Key	6 ft 8 in (2.03 m)	255 lb (116 kg)	Jr	Long Island Lutheran HS	Bay Shore, New York
F	24	Kalen Etzler	6 ft 8 in (2.03 m)	190 lb (86 kg)	RS Fr	Crestview HS	Van Wert, Ohio
C	34	Felix Okpara	6 ft 11 in (2.11 m)	220 lb (100 kg)	Fr	Link Academy	Lagos, Nigeria
G	42	Colby Baumann (W)	6 ft 3 in (1.91 m)	185 lb (84 kg)	Fr	IMG Academy	Houston, Texas
F	44	Owen Spencer (W) (redshirt)	6 ft 9 in (2.06 m)	215 lb (98 kg)	Jr	The Citadel	Cincinnati, Ohio

Head coach

- Chris Holtmann (Taylor)

Assistant coach(es)

- Jake Diebler (Valparaiso)
- Jack Owens (Eastern Illinois)
- Mike Netti (Syracuse)

Legend

- (C) Team captain
- (S) Suspended
- (I) Ineligible
- (W) Walk-on
- Injured
- Current redshirt

Roster

== Schedule and results ==
Date time, TV	Rank^{#}	Opponent^{#}	Result	Record	High points	High rebounds	High assists	Site (attendance) city, state
Exhibition
November 1, 2022*; 7:00 p.m., BTN+		Chaminade	W 101–57	0–0	25 – Holden	8 – Sensabaugh	11 – Thornton	Value City Arena (7,884); Columbus, OH
Regular season
November 7, 2022*; 7:00 p.m., BTN+		Robert Morris	W 91–53	1–0	20 – Sueing	10 – Key	6 – Likekele	Value City Arena (9,141); Columbus, OH
November 10, 2022*; 6:30 p.m., BTN		Charleston Southern	W 82–56	2–0	17 – Key	13 – Key	4 – Likekele	Value City Arena (8,409); Columbus, OH
November 16, 2022*; 7:00 p.m., BTN		Eastern Illinois	W 65–43	3–0	20 – Sensabaugh	14 – Key	3 – Gayle	Value City Arena (8,350); Columbus, OH
November 21, 2022*; 9:00 p.m., ESPN2		vs. No. 17 San Diego State; Maui Invitational Tournament quarterfinals	L 77–88	3–1	22 – McNeil	6 – Sueing	3 – Thornton	Lahaina Civic Center (2,400); Maui, HI
November 22, 2022*; 5:00 p.m., ESPN2		vs. Cincinnati; Maui Invitational Tournament consolation round	W 81–53	4–1	19 – Key	8 – Key	4 – Likekele	Lahaina Civic Center (2,400); Maui, HI
November 23, 2022*; 2:30 p.m., ESPN2		vs. No. 21 Texas Tech; Maui Invitational Tournament 5th-place game	W 80–73	5–1	33 – Sueing	8 – Sueing	5 – Sueing	Lahaina Civic Center (2,400); Maui, HI
November 30, 2022*; 7:15 p.m., ESPN	No. 25	at No. 17 Duke; ACC–Big Ten Challenge	L 72–81	5–2	21 – Key	8 – Key	2 – Thornton	Cameron Indoor Stadium (9,314); Durham, NC
December 3, 2022*; 12:00 p.m., BTN	No. 25	Saint Francis (PA)	W 96–59	6–2	15 – Sensabaugh	12 – Okpara	4 – McNeil	Value City Arena (10,398); Columbus, OH
December 8, 2022; 7:00 p.m., ESPN2	No. 25	Rutgers	W 67–66	7–2 (1–0)	22 – Key	14 – Key	5 – Thornton	Value City Arena (14,042); Columbus, OH
December 17, 2022*; 3:00 p.m., CBS	No. 23	vs. North Carolina; CBS Sports Classic	L 84–89 ^{OT}	7–3	22 – Sensabaugh	9 – Sueing	5 – Thornton	Madison Square Garden (20,261); New York, NY
December 21, 2022*; 8:30 p.m., BTN		Maine	W 95–61	8–3	19 – Sensabaugh	7 – Sensabaugh	7 – Sensabaugh	Value City Arena (10,641); Columbus, OH
December 29, 2022*; 3:00 p.m., BTN		Alabama A&M	W 90–59	9–3	21 – Sensabaugh	10 – Key	5 – Tied	Value City Arena (14,521); Columbus, OH
January 1, 2023; 7:30 p.m., BTN		at Northwestern	W 73–57	10–3 (2–0)	18 – Sensabaugh	11 – Key	6 – Thornton	Welsh–Ryan Arena (4,372); Evanston, IL
January 5, 2023; 7:00 p.m., FS1	No. 24	No. 1 Purdue	L 69–71	10–4 (2–1)	21 – Sensabaugh	5 – Tied	3 – Thornton	Value City Arena (17,227); Columbus, OH
January 8, 2023; 1:00 p.m., ESPN	No. 24	at Maryland	L 73–80	10–5 (2–2)	22 – Sensabaugh	7 – Sensabaugh	4 – Likekele	Xfinity Center (12,497); College Park, MD
January 12, 2023; 6:30 p.m., FS1		Minnesota	L 67–70	10–6 (2–3)	18 – Sensabaugh	10 – Sensabaugh	2 – Tied	Value City Arena (11,202); Columbus, OH
January 15, 2023; 2:15 p.m., BTN		at Rutgers	L 64–68 ^{OT}	10–7 (2–4)	20 – Sensabaugh	11 – Sensabaugh	2 – Sueing	Jersey Mike's Arena (8,000); Piscataway, NJ
January 18, 2023; 7:00 p.m., BTN		at Nebraska	L 60–63	10–8 (2–5)	18 – Sensabaugh	10 – Tied	4 – Sueing	Pinnacle Bank Arena (12,918); Lincoln, NE
January 21, 2023; 2:00 p.m., FOX		Iowa	W 93–77	11–8 (3–5)	27 – Sensabaugh	10 – Likekele	7 – Likekele	Value City Arena (13,630); Columbus, OH
January 24, 2023; 7:00 p.m., ESPN		at Illinois	L 60–69	11–9 (3–6)	14 – Sensabaugh	5 – Tied	3 – McNeil	State Farm Center (15,544); Champaign, IL
January 28, 2023; 8:00 p.m., FOX		at Indiana	L 70–86	11–10 (3–7)	23 – Sensabaugh	6 – Sensabaugh	3 – Tied	Simon Skjodt Assembly Hall (17,222); Bloomington, IN
February 2, 2023; 7:00 p.m., FS1		Wisconsin	L 60–65	11–11 (3–8)	13 – Sensabaugh	11 – Sueing	4 – Likekele	Value City Arena (11,918); Columbus, OH
February 5, 2023; 1:00 p.m., CBS		at Michigan; Rivalry	L 69–77	11–12 (3–9)	22 – Thornton	9 – Sensabaugh	2 – Tied	Crisler Center (12,707); Ann Arbor, MI
February 9, 2023; 8:00 p.m., FS1		Northwestern	L 63–69	11–13 (3–10)	19 – Sueing	10 – Key	3 – Thornton	Value City Arena (12,305); Columbus, OH
February 12, 2023; 1:00 p.m., CBS		Michigan State	L 41–62	11–14 (3–11)	10 – McNeil	8 – Key	2 – Tied	Value City Arena (15,110); Columbus, OH
February 16, 2023; 9:00 p.m., ESPN2		at Iowa	L 75–92	11–15 (3–12)	20 – McNeil	4 – Sueing	4 – Likekele	Carver–Hawkeye Arena (13,257); Iowa City, IA
February 19, 2023; 1:00 p.m., CBS		at No. 3 Purdue	L 55–82	11–16 (3–13)	20 – Sensabaugh	5 – Sensabaugh	2 – Sensabaugh	Mackey Arena (14,876); West Lafayette, IN
February 23, 2023; 6:30 p.m., FS1		Penn State	L 71–75	11–17 (3–14)	20 – Sensabaugh	10 – Sueing	4 – Tied	Value City Arena (11,996); Columbus, OH
February 26, 2023; 12:00 p.m., CBS		Illinois	W 72–60	12–17 (4–14)	14 – Tied	11 – Sueing	2 – Tied	Value City Arena (14,212); Columbus, OH
March 1, 2023; 7:00 p.m., BTN		No. 21 Maryland	W 73–62	13–17 (5–14)	15 – Sueing	12 – Okpara	4 – Likekele	Value City Arena (11,799); Columbus, OH
March 4, 2023; 12:00 p.m., ESPN		at Michigan State	L 78–84	13–18 (5–15)	21 – Sensabaugh	9 – Sueing	7 – Sueing	Breslin Center (14,797); East Lansing, MI
Big Ten tournament
March 8, 2023; 6:30 p.m., BTN	(13)	vs. (12) Wisconsin; First round	W 65–57	14–18	17 – McNeil	11 – Sensabaugh	3 – Gayle	United Center (15,405); Chicago, IL
March 9, 2023; 2:30 p.m., BTN	(13)	vs. (5) Iowa; Second round	W 73–69	15–18	17 – Thornton	5 – Tied	6 – Thornton	United Center (15,537); Chicago, IL
March 10, 2023; 2:30 p.m., BTN	(13)	vs. (4) Michigan State; Quarterfinals	W 68–58	16–18	21 – Thornton	8 – Okpara	6 – Thornton	United Center (16,738); Chicago, IL
March 11, 2023; 12:00 p.m., CBS	(13)	vs. (1) No. 5 Purdue; Semifinals	L 66–80	16–19	20 – Gayle Jr.	6 – Brown III	5 – Likekele	United Center; Chicago, IL
*Non-conference game. ^{#}Rankings from AP Poll. (#) Tournament seedings in parentheses. All times are in Eastern Time.

== Rankings ==
Ranking movements Legend: ██ Increase in ranking ██ Decrease in ranking — = Not ranked RV = Received votes
	Week																			
Poll	Pre	1	2	3	4	5	6	7	8	9	10	11	12	13	14	15	16	17	18	Final
AP	RV	RV	RV	25	25	23	RV	RV	24	RV	RV	—	—	—	—	—	—	—	—	Not released
Coaches	RV	RV	RV	25	23	21	RV	RV	23	RV	RV	—	—	—	—	—	—	—	—	

*AP does not release post-NCAA Tournament rankings.
