= Kyle Young =

American basketball player (born 1998)

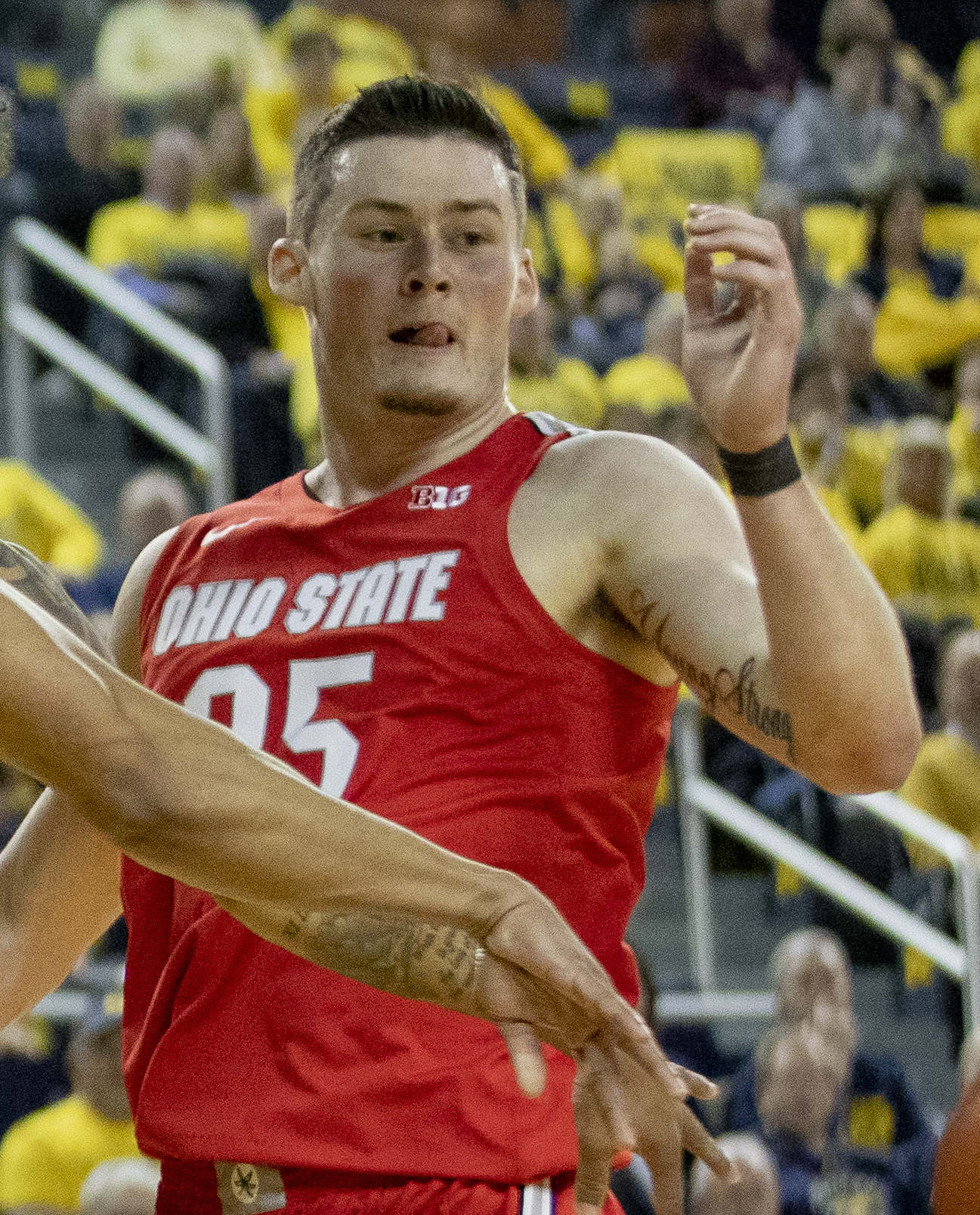

Personal information
- Born: January 5, 1998 (age 28) Jackson Twp, Ohio, U.S.
- Listed height: 6 ft 8 in (2.03 m)
- Listed weight: 225 lb (102 kg)

Career information
- High school: Jackson (Jackson Twp, Ohio)
- College: Ohio State (2017–2022)
- Position: Power forward

Kyle Young (born January 5, 1998) is an American former basketball player. He played college basketball for the Ohio State Buckeyes of the Big Ten Conference.

== Early life ==
Young was raised in Jackson Township, Ohio and went to high school at Jackson High School. In 2020, while at Ohio State, Young was named the Stark County High School Player of the Decade.

Young originally committed to Butler under head coach Chris Holtmann on August 29, 2016. After Holtmann left Butler to accept the head coaching position at Ohio State, Young decommitted from Butler and committed to Ohio State on June 19, 2017, over Butler, Akron, and Clemson.

College recruiting
Name	Hometown	School	Height	Weight	Commit date
Kyle Young; SF	Canton, OH	Jackson (OH)	6 ft 7 in (2.01 m)	210 lb (95 kg)	Jun 19, 2017
Kyle Young; SF	Recruit ratings: Rivals: 247Sports: ESPN: (83)				
Overall recruit ranking: Rivals: 109 247Sports: 128 ESPN: 88
Note: In many cases, Scout, Rivals, 247Sports, On3, and ESPN may conflict in their listings of height and weight.; In these cases, the average was taken. ESPN grades are on a 100-point scale.; Sources: "Ohio State 2017 Basketball Commitments". Rivals.; "2017 Ohio State Buckeyes Recruiting Class". ESPN.; "2017 Team Ranking". Rivals.

== College career ==
Young came off the bench during his freshman year, playing in 25 games and averaging 1.8 points and 1.6 rebounds per game.

He started 14 out of 31 games during his sophomore season, averaging 6 points and 4.4 rebounds per game. His best game of the season came against UCLA on December 22, 2018. He scored 11 points and pulled down 6 rebounds. He missed four games due to a stress fracture in his leg.

During his junior season, he became a full-time starter at power forward. He, alongside center Kaleb Wesson, were the bigs of the team. He started all 25 games he played in, averaging 7.5 points and 5.8 rebounds per game. He missed two games due to needing surgery to get his appendix removed. He also missed a few games due to a high ankle sprain. He scored a career-high 16 points and grabbed 7 rebounds against Purdue on February 15, 2020.

As a senior, Young averaged 8.6 points, 5.5 rebounds, 1.3 assists and .6 blocks per game. Following the season, he announced he was taking advantage of the additional season of eligibility granted by the NCAA due to the COVID-19 pandemic.

In his final season, he became Ohio State's sixth man with the emergence of fellow power forward Zed Key and averaged 8.2 points, 5 rebounds, 1.2 assists, and .6 blocks per game. Instead of declaring for the 2022 NBA draft and trying to start a professional career, he opted to retire from basketball on May 12, 2022.

== Career statistics ==
Legend
GP	Games played	GS	Games started	MPG	Minutes per game
FG%	Field goal percentage	3P%	3-point field goal percentage	FT%	Free throw percentage
RPG	Rebounds per game	APG	Assists per game	SPG	Steals per game
BPG	Blocks per game	PPG	Points per game	**Bold**	Career high

=== College ===
Year	Team	GP	GS	MPG	FG%	3P%	FT%	RPG	APG	SPG	BPG	PPG
2017–18	Ohio State	25	0	8.6	.442	.100	.455	1.6	.2	.3	.1	1.8
2018–19	Ohio State	**31**	14	20.5	**.672**	.167	.583	4.4	.9	**.5**	.5	6.0
2019–20	Ohio State	25	25	22.9	.585	.154	.656	**5.8**	.9	.3	.5	7.5
2020–21	Ohio State	27	**26**	**26.3**	.543	**.433**	**.846**	5.5	**1.3**	.4	**.6**	**8.6**
2021–22	Ohio State	27	4	22.7	.500	.294	.788	5.0	1.2	**.5**	**.6**	8.2
Career		135	69	20.4	.559	.291	.710	4.5	.9	.4	.5	6.5

== Personal life ==
Young has a brother, Mark Young Jr., who also played basketball at Jackson and Malone, a college in Ohio. His father, Mark Sr., played high school basketball at Hoover High School, which is close to Jackson. Mark Sr. died by suicide on October 26, 2015, after a 28-year battle with multiple sclerosis.
