= 2017–18 Ohio State Buckeyes men's basketball team =

American college basketball season

2017–18 Ohio State Buckeyes men's basketball

NCAA tournament, Second Round
- Conference: Big Ten Conference

Ranking
- Coaches: No. 21
- AP: No. 17
- Record: 25–9 (15–3 Big Ten)
- Head coach: Chris Holtmann (1st season)
- Assistant coaches: Mike Schrage (1st season); Ryan Pedon (1st season); Terry Johnson (1st season)
- Home arena: Value City Arena

2017–18 Big Ten Conference men's basketball standings
	Conf.				Overall
Team	W		L	PCT	W		L	PCT
No. 5 Michigan State	16	–	2	.889	30	–	5	.857
No. 11 Purdue	15	–	3	.833	30	–	7	.811
No. 17 Ohio State	15	–	3	.833	25	–	9	.735
No. 7 Michigan †	13	–	5	.722	33	–	8	.805
Nebraska	13	–	5	.722	22	–	11	.667
Penn State	9	–	9	.500	26	–	13	.667
Indiana	9	–	9	.500	16	–	15	.516
Maryland	8	–	10	.444	19	–	13	.594
Wisconsin	7	–	11	.389	15	–	18	.455
Northwestern	6	–	12	.333	15	–	17	.469
Minnesota	4	–	14	.222	15	–	17	.469
Illinois	4	–	14	.222	14	–	18	.438
Iowa	4	–	14	.222	14	–	19	.424
Rutgers	3	–	15	.167	15	–	19	.441
† 2018 Big Ten tournament winner Rankings from AP poll

The 2017–18 Ohio State Buckeyes men's basketball team represented Ohio State University in the 2017–18 NCAA Division I men's basketball season. Their head coach was Chris Holtmann, in his first season with the Buckeyes. The Buckeyes played their home games at Value City Arena in Columbus, Ohio as members of the Big Ten Conference. They finished the season 25–9, 15–3 in Big Ten play to finish in a tie for second place. As the No. 2 seed in the Big Ten tournament, they lost to Penn State in the quarterfinals. They received an at-large bid to the NCAA tournament as the No. 5 seed in the West region. They defeated South Dakota State in the First Round before losing to Gonzaga in the Second Round.

== Previous season ==
The Buckeyes finished the 2016–17 season 17–15, 7–11 in Big Ten play to finish in a tie for 10th place. As the No. 11 seed in the Big Ten tournament, they lost in the first round to Rutgers.

On June 5, 2017, the school announced that head coach Thad Matta would not return as head coach. On June 9, the school hired Butler head coach Chris Holtmann as head coach.

== Offseason ==
=== Departures ===
Name	Number	Pos.	Height	Weight	Year	Hometown	Notes
Marc Loving	2	F	6'8"	220	Senior	Toledo, OH	Exhausted Eligibility
D. J. Funderburk	4	F	6'9"	205	Freshman	Lakewood, OH	Dismissed from the team due to failure to meet team expectations Later enrolled at NC State to play basketball.
David Bell	10	C	6'9"	225	RS Sophomore	Cleveland, OH	Transferred to Jacksonville
JaQuan Lyle	13	G	6'5"	210	Sophomore	Evansville, IN	Transferred to New Mexico
Jimmy Jent	23	G	6'4"	195	Sophomore	Columbus, OH	Left the team for personal reasons
Trevor Thompson	32	C	7'0"	250	RS Junior	Indianapolis, IN	Declared for 2017 NBA draft

=== Incoming transfers ===
Name	Number	Pos.	Height	Weight	Year	Hometown	Previous School
Andrew Dakich	13	G	6'2"	190	Graduate Student	Zionsville, IN	Transferred from Michigan. Will be eligible to play immediately since Dakich graduated from Michigan.
Daniel Hummer	40	G	6'0"	175	Junior	Upper Arlington, OH	Transferred from Air Force. Under NCAA transfer rules, Hummer will have to sit out for the 2017–18 season. Will have two years of remaining eligibility. Will join the team as a preferred walk-on.

=== 2017 recruiting class ===
College recruiting information
Name	Hometown	School	Height	Weight	Commit date
Kaleb Wesson #11 C	Westerville, OH	Westerville South High School	6 ft 9 in (2.06 m)	300 lb (140 kg)	Jul 3, 2015
Kaleb Wesson #11 C	Recruit ratings: Scout: Rivals: 247Sports: ESPN:				
Kyle Young #21 SF	Canton, OH	Jackson High School	6 ft 7 in (2.01 m)	210 lb (95 kg)	Jun 19, 2017
Kyle Young #21 SF	Recruit ratings: Scout: Rivals: 247Sports: ESPN:				
Musa Jallow #27 SF	Bloomington, IN	Bloomington North High School	6 ft 5 in (1.96 m)	200 lb (91 kg)	Jul 7, 2017
Musa Jallow #27 SF	Recruit ratings: Scout: Rivals: 247Sports: ESPN:				
Overall recruit ranking: Scout: NR Rivals: NR ESPN: NR
Note: In many cases, Scout, Rivals, 247Sports, On3, and ESPN may conflict in their listings of height and weight.; In these cases, the average was taken. ESPN grades are on a 100-point scale.; Sources: "2017 Team Ranking". Rivals.

=== 2018 recruiting class ===
College recruiting information (2018)
Name	Hometown	School	Height	Weight	Commit date
Jaedon LeDee; SF	Houston, TX	The Kinkaid School	6 ft 7 in (2.01 m)	230 lb (100 kg)	Sep 19, 2017
Jaedon LeDee; SF	Recruit ratings: Scout: Rivals: 247Sports: ESPN:				
Duane Washington Jr. PG	Grand Rapids, MI	Sierra Canyon School	6 ft 3 in (1.91 m)	190 lb (86 kg)	Sep 20, 2017
Duane Washington Jr. PG	Recruit ratings: Scout: Rivals: 247Sports: ESPN:				
Luther Muhammad; SG	Jersey City, NJ	Hudson Catholic High School	6 ft 4 in (1.93 m)	185 lb (84 kg)	Sep 22, 2017
Luther Muhammad; SG	Recruit ratings: Scout: Rivals: 247Sports: ESPN:				
Justin Ahrens; SF	Versailles, OH	Versailles High School	6 ft 5 in (1.96 m)	181 lb (82 kg)	Sep 24, 2017
Justin Ahrens; SF	Recruit ratings: Scout: Rivals: 247Sports: ESPN:				
Overall recruit ranking:
Note: In many cases, Scout, Rivals, 247Sports, On3, and ESPN may conflict in their listings of height and weight.; In these cases, the average was taken. ESPN grades are on a 100-point scale.; Sources: "2017 Team Ranking". Rivals.

== Roster ==
2017–18 Ohio State Buckeyes men's basketball team
Players
Coaches

Pos.	#	Name	Height	Weight	Year	Previous school	Hometown
C	0	Micah Potter	6 ft 9 in (2.06 m)	240 lb (109 kg)	So	Montverde Academy	Mentor, Ohio
F	1	Jae'Sean Tate	6 ft 4 in (1.93 m)	230 lb (104 kg)	Sr	Pickerington High School Central	Pickerington, Ohio
G	2	Musa Jallow	6 ft 5 in (1.96 m)	200 lb (91 kg)	Fr	Bloomington High School North	Bloomington, Indiana
G	3	C. J. Jackson	6 ft 1 in (1.85 m)	175 lb (79 kg)	Jr	Eastern Florida State College	Charlotte, North Carolina
G	13	Andrew Dakich	6 ft 2 in (1.88 m)	190 lb (86 kg)	GS	Michigan	Zionsville, Indiana
G	14	Joey Lane (W)	6 ft 1 in (1.85 m)	180 lb (82 kg)	Jr	Deerfield High School	Deerfield, Illinois
G	15	Kam Williams	6 ft 2 in (1.88 m)	185 lb (84 kg)	RS Sr	Mount Saint Joseph High School	Baltimore, Maryland
F	24	Andre Wesson	6 ft 6 in (1.98 m)	220 lb (100 kg)	So	Westerville South High School	Westerville, Ohio
F	25	Kyle Young	6 ft 8 in (2.03 m)	205 lb (93 kg)	Fr	Jackson High School	Canton, Ohio
F	33	Keita Bates-Diop	6 ft 7 in (2.01 m)	235 lb (107 kg)	Jr	University High School	Normal, Illinois
F	34	Kaleb Wesson	6 ft 9 in (2.06 m)	270 lb (122 kg)	Fr	Westerville South High School	Westerville, Ohio
G	40	Daniel Hummer (I, W) (redshirt)	6 ft 0 in (1.83 m)	175 lb (79 kg)	Jr	Air Force	Upper Arlington, Ohio
G	43	Matt Lehmann (W)	6 ft 4 in (1.93 m)	205 lb (93 kg)	Jr	Bishop Watterson High School	Columbus, Ohio
G	45	Connor Fulton (W)	6 ft 4 in (1.93 m)	175 lb (79 kg)	Fr	Alta High School	Salt Lake City, Utah

Head coach

- Chris Holtmann (Taylor)

Assistant coach(es)

- Ryan Pedon (Wooster)
- Mike Schrage (Indiana)
- Terry Johnson (Purdue Fort Wayne)

Legend

- (C) Team captain
- (S) Suspended
- (I) Ineligible
- (W) Walk-on
- Injured
- Current redshirt

Roster

== Schedule and results ==
The 2018 Big Ten tournament was held at Madison Square Garden in New York City. Due to the Big East's use of that venue for their conference tournament, the Big Ten tournament took place one week earlier than usual, ending the week before Selection Sunday. This resulted in teams having nearly two weeks off before the NCAA tournament.

Date time, TV	Rank^{#}	Opponent^{#}	Result	Record	High points	High rebounds	High assists	Site (attendance) city, state
Exhibition
Nov 5, 2017*; 4:00 pm, BTN+		Wooster	W 88–63	—	17 – Bates-Diop	9 – Bates-Diop	5 – Dakich	Value City Arena (11,499); Columbus, OH
Regular season
Nov 10, 2017*; 7:00 pm, BTN+		Robert Morris	W 95–64	1–0	19 – Bates-Diop	11 – Bates-Diop	6 – Jackson	Value City Arena (11,128); Columbus, OH
Nov 12, 2017*; 2:30 pm, BTN+		Radford	W 82–72	2–0	22 – Bates-Diop	10 – Tied	3 – Tied	Value City Arena (10,425); Columbus, OH
Nov 16, 2017*; 7:00 pm, BTN		Texas Southern	W 82–64	3–0	17 – 3 tied	12 – Bates-Diop	9 – Jackson	Value City Arena (9,984); Columbus, OH
Nov 19, 2017*; 2:00 pm, BTN+		Northeastern; PK80–Phil Knight Invitational campus–site game	W 80–55	4–0	24 – Tate	7 – Bates-Diop	3 – Tied	Value City Arena (10,779); Columbus, OH
Nov 24, 2017*; 12:00 am, ESPN2		vs. No. 17 Gonzaga; PK80–Phil Knight Invitational Motion Bracket Quarterfinals	L 59–86	4–1	12 – Tied	10 – Bates-Diop	3 – Jackson	Veterans Memorial Coliseum (7,878); Portland, OR
Nov 24, 2017*; 9:00 pm, ESPN2		vs. Stanford; PK80–Phil Knight Invitational Motion Bracket	W 79–71	5–1	23 – Jackson	11 – Bates-Diop	3 – Tied	Moda Center; Portland, OR
Nov 26, 2017*; 3:30 pm, ESPN2		vs. Butler; PK80–Phil Knight Invitational Motion Bracket	L 66–67 ^{OT}	5–2	19 – Jackson	11 – Bates-Diop	6 – Tate	Veterans Memorial Coliseum; Portland, OR
Nov 29, 2017*; 7:00 pm, ESPN2		Clemson; ACC–Big Ten Challenge	L 65–79	5–3	21 – Bates-Diop	7 – Bates-Diop	5 – Tate	Value City Arena (17,189); Columbus, OH
Dec 2, 2017; 5:00 pm, FOX		at Wisconsin	W 83–58	6–3 (1–0)	19 – K. Wesson	11 – Bates-Diop	5 – Bates-Diop	Kohl Center (17,287); Madison, WI
Dec 4, 2017; 6:30 pm, FS1		Michigan	W 71–62	7–3 (2–0)	18 – Bates-Diop	9 – Bates-Diop	4 – Jackson	Value City Arena (12,546); Columbus, OH
Dec 9, 2017*; 12:00 pm, BTN+		William & Mary	W 97–62	8–3	27 – Bates-Diop	7 – K. Wesson	6 – Jackson	Value City Arena (11,158); Columbus, OH
Dec 16, 2017*; 6:00 pm, BTN		Appalachian State	W 80–67	9–3	19 – Tate	8 – Tied	6 – Jackson	Value City Arena (12,616); Columbus, OH
Dec 19, 2017*; 7:00 pm, BTN		The Citadel	W 94–65	10–3	17 – Tied	8 – Potter	5 – Dakich	Value City Arena (10,752); Columbus, OH
Dec 23, 2017*; 1:30 pm, CBS		vs. No. 5 North Carolina; CBS Sports Classic	L 72–86	10–4	26 – Bates-Diop	9 – Tate	6 – Tate	Smoothie King Center (8,119); New Orleans, LA
Dec 30, 2017*; 12:00 pm, ESPNU		Miami (OH)	W 72–59	11–4	19 – Bates-Diop	9 – Bates-Diop	6 – Jackson	Value City Arena (15,131); Columbus, OH
Jan 4, 2018; 7:00 pm, ESPNU		at Iowa	W 92–81	12–4 (3–0)	27 – Bates-Diop	13 – Bates-Diop	6 – Dakich	Carver–Hawkeye Arena (10,933); Iowa City, IA
Jan 7, 2018; 4:30 pm, CBS		No. 1 Michigan State	W 80–64	13–4 (4–0)	32 – Bates-Diop	7 – Bates-Diop	5 – K. Wesson	Value City Arena (17,599); Columbus, OH
Jan 11, 2018; 7:00 pm, ESPN2		Maryland	W 91–69	14–4 (5–0)	26 – Bates-Diop	8 – Bates-Diop	6 – Tied	Value City Arena (12,014); Columbus, OH
Jan 14, 2018; 7:00 pm, BTN		at Rutgers	W 68–46	15–4 (6–0)	20 – Bates-Diop	9 – Tied	6 – Jackson	Louis Brown Athletic Center (7,476); Piscataway, NJ
Jan 17, 2018; 9:00 pm, BTN	No. 22	at Northwestern	W 71–65	16–4 (7–0)	13 – Potter	8 – Bates-Diop	8 – Jackson	Allstate Arena (6,018); Rosemont, IL
Jan 20, 2018; 12:00 pm, BTN	No. 22	vs. Minnesota; B1G Super Saturday	W 67–49	17–4 (8–0)	17 – Bates-Diop	12 – Bates-Diop	5 – Tate	Madison Square Garden (4,136); New York City, NY
Jan 22, 2018; 8:00 pm, BTN	No. 13	Nebraska	W 64–59	18–4 (9–0)	20 – Bates-Diop	7 – Tied	4 – Jackson	Value City Arena (10,918); Columbus, OH
Jan 25, 2018; 8:00 pm, BTN	No. 13	Penn State	L 79–82	18–5 (9–1)	25 – Bates-Diop	10 – Tate	5 – Jackson	Value City Arena (13,464); Columbus, OH
Jan 30, 2018; 7:00 pm, ESPN2	No. 17	Indiana	W 71–56	19–5 (10–1)	16 – Tate	13 – Bates-Diop	5 – Bates-Diop	Value City Arena (14,041); Columbus, OH
Feb 4, 2018; 12:00 pm, FS1	No. 17	Illinois	W 75–67	20–5 (11–1)	35 – Bates-Diop	12 – Bates-Diop	4 – Jackson	Value City Arena (18,743); Columbus, OH
Feb 7, 2018; 8:30 pm, BTN	No. 14	at No. 3 Purdue	W 64–63	21–5 (12–1)	18 – Bates-Diop	11 – Bates-Diop	5 – Tate	Mackey Arena (14,804); West Lafayette, IN
Feb 10, 2018; 6:00 pm, BTN	No. 14	Iowa	W 82–64	22–5 (13–1)	18 – K. Wesson	8 – Bates-Diop	5 – Jackson	Value City Arena (18,809); Columbus, OH
Feb 15, 2018; 8:00 pm, BTN	No. 8	at Penn State	L 56–79	22–6 (13–2)	13 – Jackson	5 – 3 tied	2 – 3 tied	Bryce Jordan Center (10,981); University Park, PA
Feb 18, 2018; 1:00 pm, CBS	No. 8	at No. 22 Michigan	L 62–74	22–7 (13–3)	20 – Tate	15 – Tate	3 – A. Wesson	Crisler Center (12,707); Ann Arbor, MI
Feb 20, 2018; 7:00 pm, BTN	No. 16	Rutgers	W 79–52	23–7 (14–3)	18 – Jackson	10 – Tate	4 – A. Wesson	Value City Arena (15,620); Columbus, OH
Feb 23, 2018; 8:00 pm, FS1	No. 16	at Indiana	W 80–78 ^{2OT}	24–7 (15–3)	24 – Bates-Diop	14 – Bates-Diop	6 – Tate	Simon Skjodt Assembly Hall (17,222); Bloomington, IN
Big Ten tournament
Mar 2, 2018; 6:30 pm, BTN	(2) No. 13	vs. (7) Penn State; Quarterfinals	L 68–69	24–8	25 – Bates-Diop	7 – Tate	6 – Jackson	Madison Square Garden (14,530); New York City, NY
NCAA tournament
Mar 15, 2018; 4:00 pm, TNT	(5 W) No. 17	vs. (12 W) South Dakota State; First Round	W 81–73	25–8	24 – Bates-Diop	12 – Bates-Diop	5 – Jackson	Taco Bell Arena (11,662); Boise, ID
Mar 17, 2018; 7:45 pm, CBS	(5 W) No. 17	vs. (4 W) No. 8 Gonzaga; Second Round	L 84–90	25–9	28 – Bates-Diop	7 – Tate	4 – Tate	Taco Bell Arena (11,686); Boise, ID
*Non-conference game. ^{#}Rankings from AP Poll. (#) Tournament seedings in parentheses. W=West. All times are in Eastern Time.

== Rankings ==
Ranking movements Legend: ██ Increase in ranking ██ Decrease in ranking — = Not ranked RV = Received votes
	Week																			
Poll	Pre	1	2	3	4	5	6	7	8	9	10	11	12	13	14	15	16	17	18	Final
AP	—	—	—	—	—	—	—	—	—	RV	22	13	17	14	8	16	13	17	17	Not released
Coaches	—	—	—	—	—	—	—	—	—	RV	22	13	18	16	9	15	14	16	17	21

^Coaches Poll did not release a Week 2 poll at the same time AP did.
*AP does not release post-NCAA tournament rankings.

== See also ==
2017–18 Ohio State Buckeyes women's basketball team
