= 2021–22 Ohio State Buckeyes men's basketball team =

American college basketball season

2021–22 Ohio State Buckeyes men's basketball

NCAA tournament, Second Round
- Conference: Big Ten Conference
- Record: 20–12 (12–8 Big Ten)
- Head coach: Chris Holtmann (5th season)
- Assistant coaches: Ryan Pedon (5th season); Jake Diebler (3rd season); Tony Skinn (1st season)
- Home arena: Value City Arena

2021–22 Big Ten Conference men's basketball standings
| | Conf. | | | | Overall |
| Team | W | | L | PCT | W | | L | PCT |
|---|---|---|---|---|---|---|---|---|
| No. 19 Illinois | 15 | – | 5 | .750 | 23 | – | 10 | .697 |
| No. 14 Wisconsin | 15 | – | 5 | .750 | 25 | – | 8 | .758 |
| No. 10 Purdue | 14 | – | 6 | .700 | 29 | – | 8 | .784 |
| Rutgers | 12 | – | 8 | .600 | 18 | – | 14 | .563 |
| No. 16 Iowa † | 12 | – | 8 | .600 | 26 | – | 10 | .722 |
| Ohio State | 12 | – | 8 | .600 | 20 | – | 12 | .625 |
| Michigan State | 11 | – | 9 | .550 | 23 | – | 13 | .639 |
| Michigan | 11 | – | 9 | .550 | 19 | – | 15 | .559 |
| Indiana | 9 | – | 11 | .450 | 21 | – | 14 | .600 |
| Maryland | 7 | – | 13 | .350 | 15 | – | 17 | .469 |
| Penn State | 7 | – | 13 | .350 | 14 | – | 17 | .452 |
| Northwestern | 7 | – | 13 | .350 | 15 | – | 16 | .484 |
| Nebraska | 4 | – | 16 | .200 | 10 | – | 22 | .313 |
| Minnesota | 4 | – | 16 | .200 | 13 | – | 17 | .433 |
† Conference tournament winner Rankings from AP poll

The 2021–22 Ohio State Buckeyes men's basketball team represented Ohio State University in the 2021–22 NCAA Division I men's basketball season. Their head coach was Chris Holtmann, in his fifth season with the Buckeyes. The Buckeyes played their home games at Value City Arena in Columbus, Ohio as members of the Big Ten Conference. They finished the season 20–12, 12–8 in Big Ten play to finish a three-way tie for fifth place. As the No. 6 seed in the Big Ten tournament, they lost to Penn State in the quarterfinals. They received an at-large bid to the NCAA tournament as the No. 7 seed in the South region where they defeated Loyola in the First Round before losing to Villanova in the Second Round. As of 2026, this is the most recent Ohio State team to make the NCAA Tournament.

== Previous season ==
In a season limited due to the ongoing COVID-19 pandemic, the Buckeyes finished the 2020–21 season 21–10, 12–8 in Big Ten play to finish in fifth place. They defeated Minnesota, Purdue, and Michigan before losing to Illinois in overtime in the championship game of the Big Ten tournament. They received an at-large bid to the NCAA tournament as the No. 2 seed in the South region. However, they were upset in the First Round by No. 15-seeded Oral Roberts, ending their season.

== Offseason ==
On October 14, 2020, the NCAA announced that all student-athletes in winter sports during the 2020–21 school year, including men's and women's basketball, would receive an extra year of athletic eligibility. Seniors CJ Walker and Kyle Young were eligible to use the extra year. Walker chose to forgo the extra year while Young remained with the team.

=== Departures ===
| Name | Number | Pos. | Height | Weight | Year | Hometown | Reason for departure |
|---|---|---|---|---|---|---|---|
| Musa Jallow | 2 | G | 6'5" | 210 | RS Junior | Bloomington, IN | Transferred to Charlotte |
| Duane Washington Jr. | 4 | G | 6'3" | 210 | Junior | Grand Rapids, MI | Entered the 2021 NBA draft |
| CJ Walker | 13 | G | 6'1" | 195 | RS Senior | Indianapolis, IN | Graduated |
| Ibrahima Diallo | 15 | C | 6'10" | 220 | Sophomore | Saly, Senegal | Transferred to San Jose State |
| Jansen Davidson Jr. | 40 | G | 5'11" | 190 | Senior | Kettering, OH | Graduated |

=== Incoming transfers ===
| Name | Number | Pos. | Height | Weight | Year | Hometown | Previous School |
|---|---|---|---|---|---|---|---|
| Cedric Russell | 2 | G | 6'2" | 190 | Graduate Student | Alexandria, LA | Transferred from Louisiana. Will have one year of remaining eligibility. |
| Joey Brunk | 50 | C | 6'11" | 255 | Graduate Student | Indianapolis, IN | Transferred from Indiana. Will have one year of remaining eligibility. |
| Jamari Wheeler | 55 | G | 6'1" | 170 | Senior | Live Oak, FL | Transferred from Penn State. Will have one year of remaining eligibility. |

=== 2021 recruiting class ===
College recruiting
| Name | Hometown | School | Height | Weight | Commit date |
|---|---|---|---|---|---|
| Malaki Branham #4 SG | Akron, OH | St. Vincent–St. Mary | 6 ft 4 in (1.93 m) | 175 lb (79 kg) | Jul 22, 2020 |
| Malaki Branham #4 SG | Recruit ratings: Scout: Rivals: 247Sports: ESPN: | | | | |
| Kalen Etzler #21 PF | Convoy, OH | Crestview | 6 ft 8 in (2.03 m) | 195 lb (88 kg) | May 12, 2019 |
| Kalen Etzler #21 PF | Recruit ratings: Scout: Rivals: 247Sports: ESPN: | | | | |
Overall recruit ranking:
Note: In many cases, Scout, Rivals, 247Sports, On3, and ESPN may conflict in their listings of height and weight.; In these cases, the average was taken. ESPN grades are on a 100-point scale.; Sources: "2021 Team Ranking". Rivals.

=== 2022 recruiting class ===
College recruiting (2022)
| Name | Hometown | School | Height | Weight | Commit date |
|---|---|---|---|---|---|
| Roddy Gayle Jr. SG | Mount Pleasant, UT | Wasatch Academy (UT) | 6 ft 4 in (1.93 m) | 195 lb (88 kg) | Nov 13, 2020 |
| Roddy Gayle Jr. SG | Recruit ratings: Rivals: 247Sports: ESPN: (87) | | | | |
| Bowen Hardman; SG | Cincinnati, OH | Princeton (OH) | 6 ft 3 in (1.91 m) | 160 lb (73 kg) | May 13, 2020 |
| Bowen Hardman; SG | Recruit ratings: Rivals: 247Sports: ESPN: (82) | | | | |
| Felix Okpara; C | Branson, MO | Link Year Prep (MO) | 6 ft 11 in (2.11 m) | 210 lb (95 kg) | Jul 20, 2021 |
| Felix Okpara; C | Recruit ratings: Rivals: 247Sports: ESPN: (85) | | | | |
| Brice Sensabaugh; SF | Orlando, FL | Lake Highland Prep (FL) | 6 ft 6 in (1.98 m) | 240 lb (110 kg) | Sep 29, 2021 |
| Brice Sensabaugh; SF | Recruit ratings: Rivals: 247Sports: ESPN: (82) | | | | |
| Bruce Thornton; PG | Alpharetta, GA | Milton (GA) | 6 ft 2 in (1.88 m) | 195 lb (88 kg) | Nov 26, 2020 |
| Bruce Thornton; PG | Recruit ratings: Rivals: 247Sports: ESPN: (86) | | | | |
Overall recruit ranking:
Note: In many cases, Scout, Rivals, 247Sports, On3, and ESPN may conflict in their listings of height and weight.; In these cases, the average was taken. ESPN grades are on a 100-point scale.; Sources: "2022 Team Ranking". Rivals.

== Roster ==
2021–22 Ohio State Buckeyes men's basketball team
Players
Coaches

| Pos. | # | Name | Height | Weight | Year | Previous school | Hometown |
|---|---|---|---|---|---|---|---|
| G | 0 | Meechie Johnson | 6 ft 2 in (1.88 m) | 172 lb (78 kg) | So | Garfield Heights HS | Cleveland, Ohio |
| G | 1 | Jimmy Sotos | 6 ft 3 in (1.91 m) | 200 lb (91 kg) | GS | Bucknell | Elk Grove Village, Illinois |
| G | 2 | Cedric Russell | 6 ft 2 in (1.88 m) | 190 lb (86 kg) | Sr | Louisiana | Alexandria, Louisiana |
| G | 3 | Eugene Brown III | 6 ft 6 in (1.98 m) | 195 lb (88 kg) | So | Southwest DeKalb HS | Conyers, Georgia |
| F | 10 | Justin Ahrens | 6 ft 6 in (1.98 m) | 195 lb (88 kg) | Sr | Versailles HS | Versailles, Ohio |
| F | 14 | Justice Sueing (injured) | 6 ft 7 in (2.01 m) | 215 lb (98 kg) | RS Sr | California | Honolulu, Hawaii |
| G | 22 | Malaki Branham | 6 ft 5 in (1.96 m) | 180 lb (82 kg) | Fr | St. Vincent–St. Mary HS | Columbus, Ohio |
| F | 23 | Zed Key | 6 ft 8 in (2.03 m) | 245 lb (111 kg) | So | Long Island Lutheran HS | Bay Shore, New York |
| F | 24 | Kalen Etzler (redshirt) | 6 ft 8 in (2.03 m) | 200 lb (91 kg) | Fr | Crestview HS | Van Wert, Ohio |
| F | 25 | Kyle Young | 6 ft 8 in (2.03 m) | 225 lb (102 kg) | GS | Jackson HS | Canton, Ohio |
| F | 31 | Seth Towns (injured) | 6 ft 8 in (2.03 m) | 230 lb (104 kg) | GS | Harvard | Columbus, Ohio |
| F | 32 | E. J. Liddell | 6 ft 7 in (2.01 m) | 240 lb (109 kg) | Jr | Belleville HS | Belleville, Illinois |
| F | 42 | Harrison Hookfin | 6 ft 6 in (1.98 m) | 195 lb (88 kg) | Sr | Lebanon HS | Cincinnati, Ohio |
| C | 50 | Joey Brunk | 6 ft 11 in (2.11 m) | 255 lb (116 kg) | GS | Indiana | Indianapolis, Indiana |
| G | 55 | Jamari Wheeler | 6 ft 1 in (1.85 m) | 170 lb (77 kg) | GS | Penn State | Live Oak, Florida |

Head coach

- Chris Holtmann (Taylor)

Assistant coach(es)

- Ryan Pedon (Wooster)
- Jake Diebler (Valparaiso)
- Tony Skinn (George Mason)

Roster

Legend

- (C) Team captain
- (S) Suspended
- (I) Ineligible
- (W) Walk-on
- Injured
- Current redshirt

== Schedule and results ==
| Date time, TV | Rank^{#} | Opponent^{#} | Result | Record | High points | High rebounds | High assists | Site (attendance) city, state |
Exhibition
| November 1, 2021*; 7:00 p.m., BTN+ | No. 17 | Indianapolis | W 82–46 | | 15 – Brown III | 9 – Tied | 3 – Tied | Value City Arena (8,302); Columbus, OH |
Regular season
| November 9, 2021*; 6:00 p.m., ESPN2 | No. 17 | Akron | W 67–66 | 1–0 | 25 – Liddell | 11 – Liddell | 3 – Tied | Value City Arena (11,947); Columbus, OH |
| November 12, 2021*; 7:00 p.m., BTN+ | No. 17 | Niagara | W 84–74 | 2–0 | 29 – Liddell | 7 – Tied | 6 – Wheeler | Value City Arena (9,749); Columbus, OH |
| November 15, 2021*; 6:30 p.m., BTN | No. 19 | Bowling Green; Fort Myers Tip-Off campus site-game | W 89–58 | 3–0 | 13 – Tied | 9 – Key | 5 – Wheeler | Value City Arena (9,808); Columbus, OH |
| November 18, 2021*; 6:30 p.m., FS1 | No. 19 | at Xavier; Gavitt Tipoff Games | L 65–71 | 3–1 | 17 – Liddell | 8 – Brown III | 6 – Wheeler | Cintas Center (10,379); Cincinnati, OH |
| November 22, 2021*; 6:00 p.m., FS1 | | vs. No. 21 Seton Hall; Fort Myers Tip-Off Beach Division semifinals | W 79–76 | 4–1 | 28 – Liddell | 8 – Young | 3 – Tied | Suncoast Credit Union Arena (3,500); Fort Myers, FL |
| November 24, 2021*; 8:30 p.m., FS1 | | vs. No. 23 Florida; Fort Myers Tip-Off Beach Division Championship | L 68–71 | 4–2 | 23 – Liddell | 5 – Young | 3 – Ahrens | Suncoast Credit Union Arena (3,500); Fort Myers, FL |
| November 30, 2021*; 9:30 p.m., ESPN | | No. 1 Duke; ACC-Big Ten Challenge | W 71–67 | 5–2 | 20 – Key | 14 – Liddell | 6 – Liddell | Value City Arena (18,809); Columbus, OH |
| December 5, 2021; 7:30 p.m., BTN | | at Penn State | W 76–64 | 6–2 (1–0) | 16 – Young | 7 – Young | 9 – Wheeler | Bryce Jordan Center (9,128); University Park, PA |
| December 8, 2021*; 9:00 p.m., ESPNU | No. 21 | Towson | W 85–74 | 7–2 | 18 – Young | 9 – Key | 5 – Wheeler | Value City Arena (9,472); Columbus, OH |
| December 11, 2021; 12:00 p.m., BTN | No. 21 | No. 22 Wisconsin | W 73–55 | 8–2 (2–0) | 28 – Liddell | 14 – Young | 5 – Wheeler | Value City Arena (13,856); Columbus, OH |
| December 18, 2021*; 5:15 p.m., CBS | No. 15 | vs. No. 21 Kentucky; CBS Sports Classic | Canceled due to COVID-19 protocols at Ohio State | | | | | T-Mobile Arena; Las Vegas, Nevada |
| December 21, 2021*; 7:00 p.m., ESPNU | No. 14 | UT Martin | Canceled due to COVID-19 protocols at Ohio State | | | | | Value City Arena; Columbus, OH |
| December 28, 2021*; 6:30 p.m., BTN | No. 13 | New Orleans | Canceled due to COVID-19 protocols at Ohio State | | | | | Value City Arena; Columbus, OH |
| January 2, 2022; 8:00 p.m., BTN | No. 13 | at Nebraska | W 87–79 ^{OT} | 9–2 (3–0) | 35 – Branham | 14 – Key | 5 – Liddell | Pinnacle Bank Arena (14,478); Lincoln, NE |
| January 6, 2022; 7:00 p.m., FS1 | No. 13 | at Indiana | L 51–67 | 9–3 (3–1) | 13 – Branham | 9 – Liddell | 6 – Wheeler | Simon Skjodt Assembly Hall (14,130); Bloomington, IN |
| January 9, 2022; 5:30 p.m., BTN | No. 13 | Northwestern | W 95–87 | 10–3 (4–1) | 34 – Liddell | 8 – Wheeler | 6 – Wheeler | Value City Arena (10,620); Columbus, OH |
| January 13, 2022; 7:00 p.m., ESPN2 | No. 16 | at No. 13 Wisconsin | L 68–78 | 10–4 (4–2) | 18 – Liddell | 8 – Key | 3 – Wheeler | Kohl Center (15,571); Madison, WI |
| January 16, 2022; 12:00 p.m., BTN | No. 16 | Penn State | W 61–56 | 11–4 (5–2) | 19 – Liddell | 8 – Liddell | 3 – Liddell | Value City Arena (13,565); Columbus, OH |
| January 18, 2022*; 7:00 p.m., BTN | No. 19 | IUPUI | W 83–37 | 12–4 | 14 – Brown | 10 – Liddell | 9 – Sotos | Value City Arena (10,666); Columbus, OH |
| January 27, 2022; 8:00 p.m., ESPN | No. 16 | at Minnesota | W 75–64 | 13–4 (6–2) | 23 – Liddell | 15 – Liddell | 5 – Liddell | Williams Arena (10,179); Minneapolis, MN |
| January 30, 2022; 12:00 p.m., CBS | No. 16 | at No. 6 Purdue | L 78–81 | 13–5 (6–3) | 20 – Tied | 7 – Branham | 3 – Liddell | Mackey Arena (14,804); West Lafayette, IN |
| February 6, 2022; 1:00 p.m., CBS | No. 16 | Maryland | W 82–67 | 14–5 (7–3) | 24 – Liddell | 11 – Liddell | 5 – Liddell | Value City Arena (15,912); Columbus, OH |
| February 9, 2022; 7:00 p.m., BTN | No. 16 | at Rutgers | L 64–66 | 14–6 (7–4) | 19 – Branham | 12 – Key | 4 – Liddell | Rutgers Athletic Center (8,019); Piscataway, NJ |
| February 12, 2022; 6:00 p.m., ESPN | No. 16 | at Michigan; Rivalry | W 68–57 | 15–6 (8–4) | 28 – Liddell | 8 – Brown | 2 – Young | Crisler Center (12,707); Ann Arbor, MI |
| February 15, 2022; 8:30 p.m., BTN | No. 18 | Minnesota | W 70–45 | 16–6 (9–4) | 16 – Liddell | 10 – Liddell | 3 – Wheeler | Value City Arena (12,360); Columbus, OH |
| February 19, 2022; 2:30 p.m., FOX | No. 18 | Iowa; Rescheduled from February 3 | L 62–75 | 16–7 (9–5) | 22 – Branham | 8 – Tied | 3 – Tied | Value City Arena (15,876); Columbus, OH |
| February 21, 2022; 7:00 p.m., FS1 | No. 22 | Indiana | W 80–69 ^{OT} | 17–7 (10–5) | 27 – Branham | 7 – Liddell | 3 – Branham | Value City Arena (13,744); Columbus, OH |
| February 24, 2022; 9:00 p.m., FS1 | No. 22 | at No. 15 Illinois | W 86–83 | 18–7 (11–5) | 31 – Branham | 6 – Liddell | 3 – Wheeler | State Farm Center (15,544); Champaign, IL |
| February 27, 2022; 4:00 p.m., CBS | No. 22 | at Maryland | L 60–75 | 18–8 (11–6) | 13 – Branham | 6 – Tied | 3 – Branham | Xfinity Center (15,842); College Park, MD |
| March 1, 2022; 7:00 p.m., BTN | No. 23 | Nebraska; Rescheduled from January 22 | L 70–78 | 18–9 (11–7) | 27 – Liddell | 14 – Liddell | 3 – Brown | Value City Arena (12,268); Columbus, OH |
| March 3, 2022; 7:00 p.m., ESPN | No. 23 | Michigan State | W 80–69 | 19–9 (12–7) | 22 – Branham | 8 – Liddell | 4 – Branham | Value City Arena (14,951); Columbus, OH |
| March 6, 2022; 12:30 p.m., FOX | No. 23 | Michigan; Rivalry | L 69–75 | 19–10 (12–8) | 18 – Branham | 13 – Liddell | 3 – Wheeler | Value City Arena (18,809); Columbus, OH |
Big Ten tournament
| March 10, 2022; 9:15 p.m., BTN | (6) | vs. (11) Penn State; Second Round | L 68–71 | 19–11 | 25 – Liddell | 8 – Liddell | 4 – Branham | Gainbridge Fieldhouse; Indianapolis, IN |
NCAA tournament
| March 18, 2022; 12:15 p.m., CBS | (7 S) | vs. (10 S) Loyola–Chicago; First Round | W 54–41 | 20–11 | 16 – Liddell | 10 – Liddell | 2 – Branham | PPG Paints Arena; Pittsburgh, PA |
| March 20, 2022; 2:50 p.m., CBS | (7 S) | vs. (2 S) No. 6 Villanova; Second Round | L 61–71 | 20–12 | 23 – Branham | 11 – Key | 4 – Branham | PPG Paints Arena (18,506); Pittsburgh, PA |
*Non-conference game. ^{#}Rankings from AP Poll. (#) Tournament seedings in parentheses. All times are in Eastern Time.

== Rankings ==
Ranking movements Legend: ██ Increase in ranking ██ Decrease in ranking RV = Received votes т = Tied with team above or below
| | Week | | | | | | | | | | | | | | | | | | | |
| Poll | Pre | 1 | 2 | 3 | 4 | 5 | 6 | 7 | 8 | 9 | 10 | 11 | 12 | 13 | 14 | 15 | 16 | 17 | 18 | Final |
|---|---|---|---|---|---|---|---|---|---|---|---|---|---|---|---|---|---|---|---|---|
| AP | 17 | 19 | RV | RV | 21 | 15 | 14 | 13 | 13 | 16 | 19 | 16 | 16 | 16 | 18 | 22 | 23 | RV | RV | Not released |
| Coaches | 17т | 17т^ | RV | RV | 22 | 15 | 13 | 12 | 12 | 15 | 18 | 16 | 16 | 16 | 18 | 19 | 23 | 25 | RV | |

*AP does not release post-NCAA Tournament rankings
^Coaches did not release a Week 1 poll.
