= Jackson Local School District =

School district in Ohio

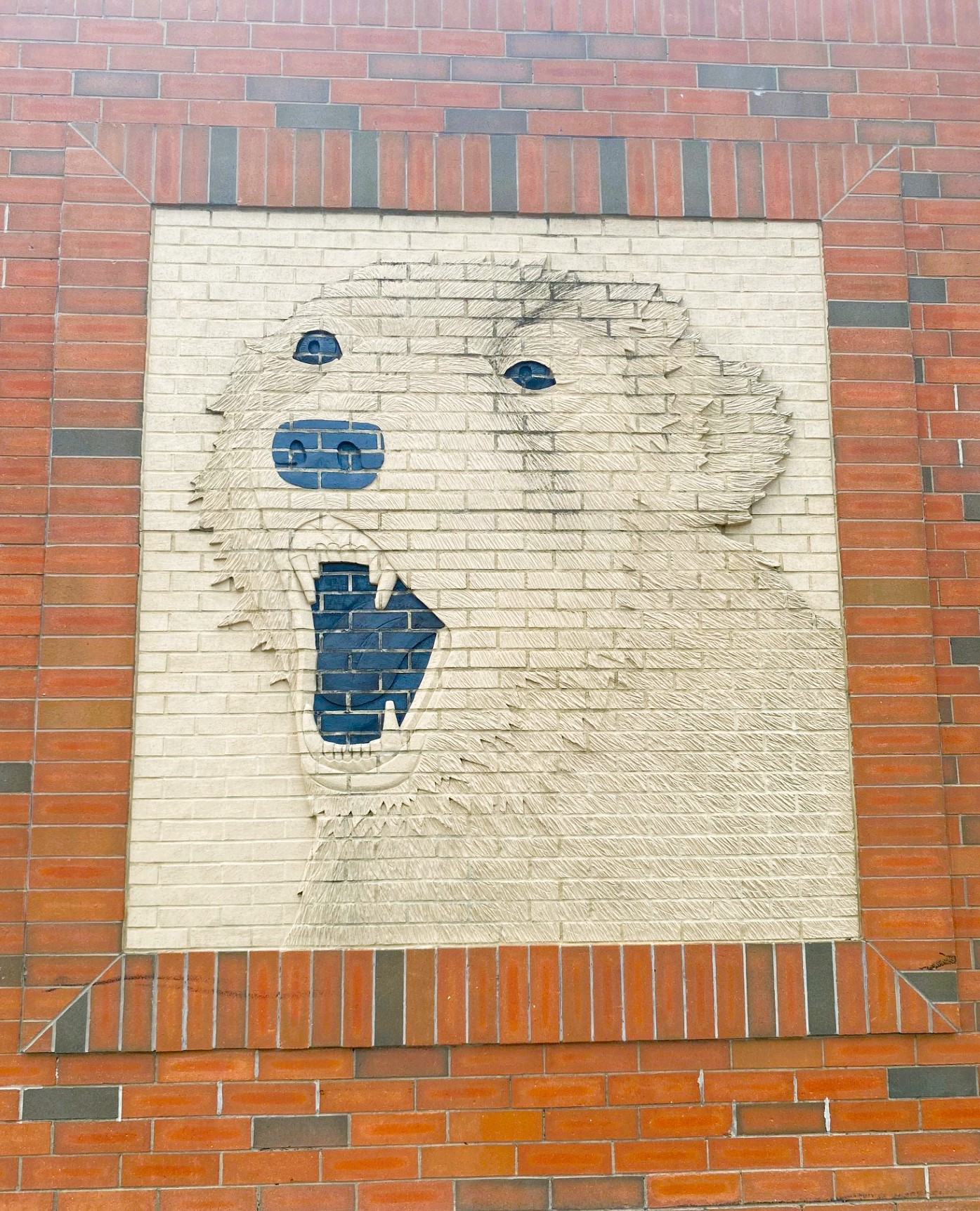
Jackson Polar Bears

Jackson Local Schools is a school district located in Jackson Township, Stark County, Ohio, United States.

The district includes: four elementary schools, one middle school and one high school. The district's mascot are the Polar Bears. U.S. News & World Report consistently ranks Jackson High School as one of the top 9-12 educational institutions in Ohio and among the top 6% in the country. BackgroundCheck.org ranked the Jackson Local School District the top district in Ohio.

Jackson Local Schools' superintendent is Chris DiLoreto who has held said position since August 2011. Barry Mason is the assistant superintendent. Todd Porter is the director of communications.

== Schools ==
=== Elementary schools (K-5) ===
- Amherst Elementary School
- Lake Cable Elementary School
- Sauder Elementary School
- Strausser Elementary School

=== Middle school (6-8) ===
- Jackson Memorial Middle School

=== High school (9-12) ===
- Jackson High School
