= 2020–21 Ohio State Buckeyes men's basketball team =

American college basketball season

2020–21 Ohio State Buckeyes men's basketball

NCAA tournament, First Round
- Conference: Big Ten Conference

Ranking
- Coaches: No. 15
- AP: No. 7
- Record: 21–10 (12–8 Big Ten)
- Head coach: Chris Holtmann (4th season)
- Assistant coaches: Ryan Pedon (4th season); Terry Johnson (4th season); Jake Diebler (2nd season)
- Home arena: Value City Arena

2020–21 Big Ten Conference men's basketball standings
	Conf.				Overall
Team	W		L	PCT	W		L	PCT
No. 4 Michigan	14	–	3	.824	23	–	5	.821
No. 2 Illinois †	16	–	4	.800	24	–	7	.774
No. 8 Iowa	14	–	6	.700	22	–	9	.710
No. 20 Purdue	13	–	6	.684	18	–	10	.643
No. 7 Ohio State	12	–	8	.600	21	–	10	.677
Wisconsin	10	–	10	.500	18	–	13	.581
Rutgers	10	–	10	.500	16	–	12	.571
Maryland	9	–	11	.450	17	–	14	.548
Michigan State	9	–	11	.450	15	–	13	.536
Indiana	7	–	12	.368	12	–	15	.444
Penn State	7	–	12	.368	11	–	14	.440
Northwestern	6	–	13	.316	9	–	15	.375
Minnesota	6	–	14	.300	14	–	15	.483
Nebraska	3	–	16	.158	7	–	20	.259
† Conference tournament winner Rankings from AP poll

The 2020–21 Ohio State Buckeyes men's basketball team represented Ohio State University in the 2020–21 NCAA Division I men's basketball season. Their head coach was Chris Holtmann, in his fourth season with the Buckeyes. The Buckeyes played their home games at Value City Arena in Columbus, Ohio as members of the Big Ten Conference.

They finished the season 21–10, 12–8 in Big Ten play to finish in fifth place. They defeated Minnesota, Purdue, and Michigan before losing to Illinois in overtime in the championship game of the Big Ten tournament. They received an at-large bid to the NCAA tournament as the No. 2 seed in the South region. However, they were upset in the First Round by No. 15-seeded Oral Roberts.

== Previous season ==
The Buckeyes finished the 2019–20 season 21–10, 11–9 in Big Ten play to finish in a tie for fifth place. The 2020 Big Ten men's basketball tournament and 2020 NCAA Division I men's basketball tournament were cancelled due to the COVID-19 pandemic.

== Offseason ==
=== Departures ===
Name	Number	Pos.	Height	Weight	Year	Hometown	Reason for departure
Alonzo Gaffney	0	F	6'9"	198	Freshman	Cleveland, OH	Transferred to Northwest Florida (JUCO)
Luther Muhammad	1	G	6'3"	185	Sophomore	Jersey City, NJ	Transferred to Arizona State
D. J. Carton	3	G	6'1"	190	Freshman	Bettendorf, IA	Transferred to Marquette
Andre Wesson	24	F	6'6"	220	Senior	Westerville, OH	Graduated
Kaleb Wesson	34	F	6'9"	270	Junior	Westerville, OH	Declared for 2020 NBA draft
Daniel Hummer	40	G	6'0"	175	RS Senior	Upper Arlington, OH	Walk-on; graduated

=== Incoming transfers ===
Name	Number	Pos.	Height	Weight	Year	Hometown	Previous School
Jimmy Sotos	1	G	6'3"	200	Senior	Elk Grove Village, IL	Transferred from Bucknell. Will have two years of remaining eligibility.
Seth Towns	31	F	6'8"	230	Graduate Student	Columbus, OH	Transferred from Harvard. Will have two years of remaining eligibility.

=== 2020 recruiting class ===
College recruiting
Name	Hometown	School	Height	Weight	Commit date
Meechie Johnson Jr. PG	Cleveland, OH	Garfield Heights (OH)	6 ft 1 in (1.85 m)	185 lb (84 kg)	Aug 13, 2019
Meechie Johnson Jr. PG	Recruit ratings: Rivals: 247Sports: ESPN: (80)				
Eugene Brown III; SG	Conyers, GA	Southwest DeKalb (GA)	6 ft 6 in (1.98 m)	185 lb (84 kg)	Sep 16, 2019
Eugene Brown III; SG	Recruit ratings: Rivals: 247Sports: ESPN: (80)				
Zed Key; PF	Bay Shore, NY	Long Island Lutheran (NY)	6 ft 7 in (2.01 m)	215 lb (98 kg)	Sep 22, 2019
Zed Key; PF	Recruit ratings: Rivals: 247Sports: ESPN: (80)				
Overall recruit ranking:
Note: In many cases, Scout, Rivals, 247Sports, On3, and ESPN may conflict in their listings of height and weight.; In these cases, the average was taken. ESPN grades are on a 100-point scale.; Sources: "2020 Team Ranking". Rivals.

=== 2021 Recruiting class ===
College recruiting (2021)
Name	Hometown	School	Height	Weight	Commit date
Malaki Branham #4 SG	Akron, OH	St. Vincent-St. Mary	6 ft 4 in (1.93 m)	175 lb (79 kg)	Jul 22, 2020
Malaki Branham #4 SG	Recruit ratings: Scout: Rivals: 247Sports: ESPN:				
Kalen Etzler #21 PF	Convoy, OH	Crestview	6 ft 8 in (2.03 m)	195 lb (88 kg)	May 12, 2019
Kalen Etzler #21 PF	Recruit ratings: Scout: Rivals: 247Sports: ESPN:				
Overall recruit ranking:
Note: In many cases, Scout, Rivals, 247Sports, On3, and ESPN may conflict in their listings of height and weight.; In these cases, the average was taken. ESPN grades are on a 100-point scale.; Sources: "2021 Team Ranking". Rivals.

== Roster ==
2020–21 Ohio State Buckeyes men's basketball team
Players
Coaches

Pos.	#	Name	Height	Weight	Year	Previous school	Hometown
G	0	Meechie Johnson	6 ft 2 in (1.88 m)	172 lb (78 kg)	Fr	Garfield Heights HS	Cleveland, Ohio
G	1	Jimmy Sotos	6 ft 3 in (1.91 m)	200 lb (91 kg)	Sr	Bucknell	Elk Grove Village, Illinois
G	2	Musa Jallow	6 ft 5 in (1.96 m)	210 lb (95 kg)	RS Jr	Bloomington HS North	Bloomington, Indiana
G	3	Eugene Brown III	6 ft 6 in (1.98 m)	195 lb (88 kg)	Fr	Southwest DeKalb HS	Conyers, Georgia
G	4	Duane Washington Jr.	6 ft 3 in (1.91 m)	210 lb (95 kg)	Jr	Sierra Canyon School	Grand Rapids, Michigan
F	10	Justin Ahrens	6 ft 6 in (1.98 m)	195 lb (88 kg)	Jr	Versailles HS	Versailles, Ohio
G	13	CJ Walker	6 ft 1 in (1.85 m)	195 lb (88 kg)	RS Sr	Florida State	Indianapolis, Indiana
F	14	Justice Sueing	6 ft 7 in (2.01 m)	215 lb (98 kg)	RS Jr	California	Honolulu, Hawaii
C	15	Ibrahima Diallo	6 ft 10 in (2.08 m)	220 lb (100 kg)	So	Prolific Prep	Saly, Senegal
F	23	Zed Key	6 ft 8 in (2.03 m)	245 lb (111 kg)	Fr	Long Island Lutheran HS	Bay Shore, New York
F	25	Kyle Young	6 ft 8 in (2.03 m)	225 lb (102 kg)	Sr	Jackson HS	Canton, Ohio
F	31	Seth Towns	6 ft 8 in (2.03 m)	230 lb (104 kg)	GS	Harvard	Columbus, Ohio
F	32	E. J. Liddell	6 ft 7 in (2.01 m)	240 lb (109 kg)	So	Belleville HS	Belleville, Illinois
G	40	Jansen Davidson Jr. (W)	5 ft 11 in (1.8 m)	190 lb (86 kg)	Sr	Fairmont HS	Kettering, Ohio
F	42	Harrison Hookfin (W)	6 ft 6 in (1.98 m)	195 lb (88 kg)	Jr	Lebanon HS	Cincinnati, Ohio

Head coach

- Chris Holtmann (Taylor)

Assistant coach(es)

- Ryan Pedon (Wooster)
- Terry Johnson (Purdue Fort Wayne)
- Jake Diebler (Valparaiso)

Legend

- (C) Team captain
- (S) Suspended
- (I) Ineligible
- (W) Walk-on
- Injured
- Current redshirt

Roster

== Schedule and results ==
Ohio State canceled its game against Alabama A&M due to COVID-19 issues at Alabama A&M. They also postponed their game against Penn State, rescheduling the game to January 27, 2021.

Date time, TV	Rank^{#}	Opponent^{#}	Result	Record	High points	High rebounds	High assists	Site (attendance) city, state
Regular season
November 25, 2020*; 2:00 pm, ESPN	No. 23	Illinois State	W 94–67	1–0	19 – Sueing	8 – Tied	6 – Walker	Value City Arena (0); Columbus, OH
November 29*; 12:00 pm, BTN	No. 23	UMass Lowell	W 74–64	2–0	21 – Washington Jr.	8 – Tied	5 – Walker	Covelli Center (0); Columbus, OH
December 2*; 5:00 pm, BTN	No. 23	Morehead State	W 77–44	3–0	16 – Liddell	9 – Young	4 – Tied	Covelli Center (0); Columbus, OH
December 5* Canceled	No. 23	Alabama A&M	Canceled due to COVID-19 issues at Alabama A&M					Value City Arena; Columbus, OH
December 8*; 7:30 pm, ESPN2	No. 22	at Notre Dame; ACC–Big Ten Challenge	W 90–85	4–0	19 – Liddell	12 – Liddell	4 – Tied	Edmund P. Joyce Center (156); Notre Dame, IN
December 13*; 4:00 pm, BTN	No. 22	Cleveland State	W 67–61	5–0	17 – Washington Jr.	10 – Key	3 – Walker	Value City Arena (0); Columbus, OH
December 16; 7:00 pm, BTN	No. 20	at Purdue	L 60–67	5–1 (0–1)	14 – Sueing	8 – Young	7 – Walker	Mackey Arena (250); West Lafayette, IN
December 19*; 4:15 pm, CBS	No. 20	vs. UCLA; CBS Sports Classic	W 77–70	6–1	14 – Washington Jr.	6 – Key	4 – Walker	Rocket Mortgage FieldHouse (0); Cleveland, OH
December 23; 4:30 pm, BTN	No. 23	No. 11 Rutgers	W 80–68	7–1 (1–1)	22 – Washington Jr.	12 – Young	5 – Walker	Value City Arena (0); Columbus, OH
December 26; 2:00 pm, FS1	No. 23	at Northwestern	L 70–71	7–2 (1–2)	15 – Liddell	8 – Tied	5 – Walker	Welsh–Ryan Arena (0); Evanston, IL
December 30; 6:30 pm, BTN	No. 25	Nebraska	W 90–54	8–2 (2–2)	18 – Ahrens	6 – Tied	3 – Tied	Value City Arena (0); Columbus, OH
January 3, 2021; 5:30 pm, BTN	No. 25	at No. 21 Minnesota	L 60–77	8–3 (2–3)	21 – Washington Jr.	7 – Tied	3 – Sueing	Williams Arena (0); Minneapolis, MN
January 9; 12:00 pm, BTN		at No. 15 Rutgers	W 79–68	9–3 (3–3)	17 – Washington Jr.	10 – Sueing	5 – Sueing	Rutgers Athletic Center (0); Piscataway, NJ
January 13; 7:00 pm, BTN	No. 21	Northwestern	W 81–71	10–3 (4–3)	23 – Washington Jr.	10 – Liddell	6 – Washington Jr.	Value City Arena (0); Columbus, OH
January 16; 12:00 pm, FOX	No. 21	at No. 14 Illinois	W 87–81	11–3 (5–3)	26 – Liddell	7 – Tied	4 – Sueing	State Farm Center (175); Champaign, IL
January 19; 6:30 pm, BTN	No. 15	Purdue	L 65–67	11–4 (5–4)	21 – Washington Jr.	7 – Liddell	6 – Washington Jr.	Value City Arena (0); Columbus, OH
January 23; 4:00 pm, CBS	No. 15	at No. 10 Wisconsin	W 74–62	12–4 (6–4)	20 – Liddell	7 – Liddell	4 – Washington Jr.	Kohl Center (0); Madison, WI
January 27; 7:00 pm, BTN	No. 13	Penn State	W 83–79	13–4 (7–4)	22 – Liddell	10 – Sueing	6 – Washington Jr.	Value City Arena (0); Columbus, OH
January 31; 1:00 pm, CBS	No. 13	Michigan State	W 79–62	14–4 (8–4)	20 – Liddell	8 – Liddell	3 – Washington Jr.	Value City Arena (0); Columbus, OH
February 4; 7:00 pm, ESPN	No. 7	at No. 8 Iowa	W 89–85	15–4 (9–4)	16 – Tied	11 – Sueing	9 – Walker	Carver–Hawkeye Arena (503); Iowa City, IA
February 8; 9:00 pm, FS1	No. 4	at Maryland	W 73–65	16–4 (10–4)	18 – Tied	6 – Liddell	4 – Washington Jr.	Xfinity Center (0); College Park, MD
February 13; 12:00 pm, ESPN	No. 4	Indiana	W 78–59	17–4 (11–4)	19 – Liddell	10 – Sueing	4 – Walker	Value City Arena (0); Columbus, OH
February 18; 8:00 pm, BTN	No. 4	at Penn State	W 92–82	18–4 (12–4)	23 – Liddell	6 – Sueing	7 – Walker	Bryce Jordan Center (244); University Park, PA
February 21; 1:00 pm, CBS	No. 4	No. 3 Michigan; Rivalry	L 87–92	18–5 (12–5)	30 – Washington Jr.	10 – Liddell	3 – Tied	Value City Arena (0); Columbus, OH
February 25; 9:00 pm, ESPN	No. 4	at Michigan State	L 67–71	18–6 (12–6)	18 – Liddell	8 – Liddell	5 – Walker	Breslin Center (0); East Lansing, MI
February 28; 4:00 pm, CBS	No. 4	No. 9 Iowa	L 57–73	18–7 (12–7)	15 – Liddell	5 – Tied	4 – Walker	Value City Arena (0); Columbus, OH
March 6; 4:00 pm, ESPN	No. 7	No. 4 Illinois	L 68–73	18–8 (12–8)	19 – Liddell	8 – Sueing	6 – Washington Jr.	Value City Arena (0); Columbus, OH
Big Ten tournament
March 11, 2021; 2:00 pm, BTN	(5) No. 9	vs. (13) Minnesota; Second Round	W 79–75	19–8	16 – Tied	7 – Sueing	6 – Walker	Lucas Oil Stadium (6,206); Indianapolis, IN
March 12, 2021; 2:00 pm, BTN	(5) No. 9	vs. (4) No. 20 Purdue; Quarterfinals	W 87–78 ^{OT}	20–8	20 – Washington Jr.	10 – Sueing	7 – Walker	Lucas Oil Stadium (7,634); Indianapolis, IN
March 13, 2021; 1:00 pm, CBS	(5) No. 9	vs. (1) No. 4 Michigan; Semifinals/Rivalry	W 68–67	21–8	24 – Washington Jr.	6 – Washington Jr.	4 – Tied	Lucas Oil Stadium (8,000); Indianapolis, IN
March 14, 2021; 3:30 pm, CBS	(5) No. 9	vs. (2) No. 3 Illinois; Championship	L 88–91 ^{OT}	21–9	32 – Washington Jr.	8 – Washington Jr.	4 – Walker	Lucas Oil Stadium (8,000); Indianapolis, IN
NCAA tournament
March 19, 2021; 3:00 pm, CBS	(2 S) No. 7	vs. (15 S) Oral Roberts; First Round	L 72–75 ^{OT}	21–10	23 – Liddell	12 – Liddell	5 – Liddell	Mackey Arena; West Lafayette, IN
*Non-conference game. ^{#}Rankings from AP Poll. (#) Tournament seedings in parentheses. All times are in Eastern Time.

== Rankings ==
Ranking movements Legend: ██ Increase in ranking ██ Decrease in ranking RV = Received votes т = Tied with team above or below
	Week																	
Poll	Pre	1	2	3	4	5	6	7	8	9	10	11	12	13	14	15	16	Final
AP	23	23	22	20	23	25	RV	21	15	13	7	4	4	4	7	9	7	Not released
Coaches	24	24^	20	19	20	20т	RV	RV	18	15	9	5	4	5	10	10	7	15

*AP does not release post-NCAA Tournament rankings
^Coaches did not release a Week 1 poll.
