= Chris Holtmann =

American basketball coach (born 1971)

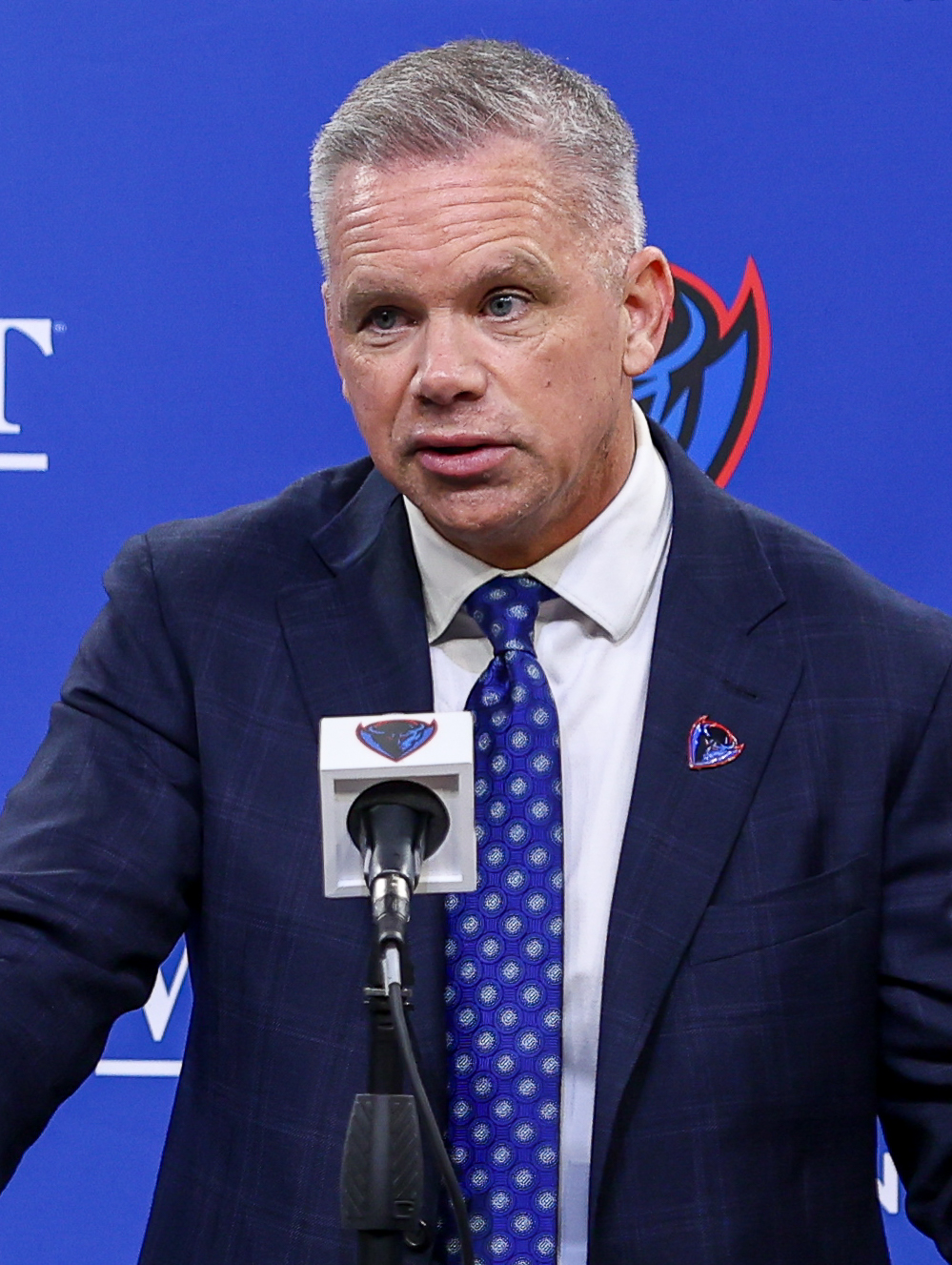
- Holtmann introduced as DePaul head coach in March 2024

Current position
- Title: Head coach
- Team: DePaul
- Conference: Big East
- Record: 35–36 (.493)
- Annual salary: $1.5 million

Biographical details
- Born: November 11, 1971 (age 55); Lexington, Kentucky, U.S.

Playing career
- 1990–1992: Brescia
- 1992–1994: Taylor
- Position: Guard

Coaching career (HC unless noted)
- 1998–1999: Geneva (assistant)
- 1999–2003: Taylor (assistant)
- 2003–2008: Gardner–Webb (assistant)
- 2008–2010: Ohio (assistant)
- 2010–2013: Gardner–Webb
- 2013–2014: Butler (assistant)
- 2014–2017: Butler
- 2017–2024: Ohio State
- 2024–present: DePaul

Head coaching record
- Overall: 286–207 (.580)
- Tournaments: 7–7 (NCAA Division I); 0–1 (CIT); 0–1 (CBC)

Accomplishments and honors

Awards
- All-American (1994); Skip Prosser Man of the Year Award (2026); John McLendon National Coach of the Year (2017); Jim Phelan Award (2018); Big South Coach of the Year (2013); Big East Coach of the Year (2017); Big Ten Coach of the Year (2018)

Christopher Adam Holtmann (born November 11, 1971) is an American college basketball coach who is currently the head coach at DePaul University.

Holtmann grew up in Nicholasville, Kentucky, and started his college playing career in-state at Brescia College in Owensboro. After two seasons, he transferred to Taylor University, where he played for his final two seasons. In 1994, his senior year, he earned All-America honors and Taylor hit number one in the National Association of Intercollegiate Athletics (NAIA) rankings. Holtmann got his start in coaching as a graduate assistant at Taylor in 1997. The next year, he became an assistant coach at Geneva College, then returned to his alma mater as an assistant in 1999.

Holtmann joined Gardner-Webb's staff in 2002 and spent the next five seasons there, first as an assistant coach and then as associate head coach. After two seasons as an assistant at Ohio, he returned to Gardner-Webb as head coach. At Gardner-Webb, he led a successful rebuilding effort culminating in the school's first Division I postseason appearance in 2013. He was named conference and district coach of the year for his efforts.

In July 2013, Holtmann left Gardner-Webb to become an assistant coach at Butler. In October 2014, he took over the program as interim head coach when Brandon Miller requested a medical leave of absence from the university; the following January, Holtmann was named the permanent head coach.

On June 9, 2017, Holtmann left Butler to become the head coach at Ohio State.

On February 14, 2024, Chris Holtmann parted ways with Ohio State mid-way through the 2023–24 season. On March 14, 2024, Holtmann was hired by DePaul to be their head coach.

== Early life and college ==
Born and raised in Lexington, Kentucky, Holtmann moved with his family to nearby Nicholasville after eighth grade. Holtmann was a fan of University of Kentucky basketball growing up.

He played high school basketball at Jessamine County High School, and was recruited by NAIA Hall of Fame coach Paul Patterson to play at Taylor University, but initially attended and played at Brescia College before transferring to Taylor in 1992. In 1994, Holtmann earned All-America honors as the captain of Taylor, which hit number one on the NAIA rankings. At Taylor, he played alongside his future boss, John Groce.

Holtmann graduated from Taylor in 1994 with a degree in psychology. In 2000, he earned a master's degree in athletic administration from Ball State.

== Coaching career ==
=== Early career ===
Holtmann began his coaching career as a graduate assistant working for Patterson at Taylor University in 1997. He spent the following year as an assistant coach at Geneva College before returning to his alma mater as an assistant coach. At Taylor, his coaching duties included coordinating recruiting. During his last two years there, the team won its conference and finished in the NAIA top 15 both years. Patterson later described Holtmann as "a bright, energetic, tireless worker who has been a high achiever his entire career."

In 2002, Holtmann joined the staff of Gardner-Webb. He spent the next five seasons with the university, first an assistant coach, then as associate head coach for the last four years. While at Gardner-Webb, he earned a reputation as a defensive tactician and a strong recruiter. During the 2007–08 season, the team led the Atlantic Sun Conference in three-point field goal defense, and was second in overall field goal percentage defense. During Holtmann's tenure, Gardner-Webb twice had recruiting classes ranked in the top 100. He recruited two-time Atlantic Sun Defensive Player of the Year, Tim Jennings, 2008 Atlantic Sun Player of the Year, Thomas Sanders, and 2008 Freshman of the Year, Nate Blank. Holtmann was also responsible for recruiting 2009 All-American Aaron Linn before leaving the school.

In 2008, Holtmann was the first hire of new Ohio Bobcats head coach John Groce. At Ohio, he was in charge of developing the team's wings and assisted with coordinating the team's defensive efforts. During his first year at Ohio, the team led the Mid-American Conference (MAC) in three-point field goal percentage for the first time in school history, thanks largely to strong play from the wings. Under Holtmann's tutelage, Steven Coleman led the league in field goal percentage and steals among freshmen, en route to MAC All-Freshman Team honors. On defense, Ohio turned in the sixth-lowest opponent field goal percentage in the program's history.

The following year, Ohio had the MAC's top-rated recruiting class for the second straight year, including freshman of the year D.J. Cooper. The team won the MAC and advanced to the NCAA tournament. Seeded 14th, the team upset 3rd-seeded Georgetown. After the season, Holtmann left Ohio to accept the head coaching position at Gardner-Webb for the 2010–11 season. At the time, Groce called him "an exceptional coach but an even better person."

=== Gardner-Webb ===
In the 2009–10 season, the year before Holtmann arrived, Gardner-Webb won eight games. During his first season, the team got off to 6–4 start before finishing 11–21 with eight losses by three points or less. The following season, Gardner-Webb went 12–20.

In the 2012–13 season, Holtmann led Gardner-Webb to a school-record (since joining Division I in 2002) 21 wins, including wins in 10 of their last 11 regular-season games. At 21–13, the team finished second overall in the Big South Conference. They had the highest Rating Percentage Index (RPI) in the league, and the highest in team history. Gardner-Webb lost by three points in the semi-finals of the conference tournament, but was selected to participate in the CollegeInsider.com Postseason Tournament (CIT). It was the first Division I postseason appearance in the school's history. Holtmann won Big South Coach of the Year honors, and was named as the National Association of Basketball Coaches (NABC) District 3 Coach of the Year. He was also a finalist for the Hugh Durham Award for mid-major coach of the year. After the season, Holtmann was granted a contract extension through 2018.

=== Butler ===
On July 15, 2013, Holtmann left Gardner-Webb to join the Butler staff as an assistant coach under Brandon Miller. Explaining his decision, Miller said Holtmann's experience "speaks for itself" and added "his values and what he stands for, who he is as a person, fits Butler University." Upon his departure, Gardner-Webb described Holtmann's tenure as a successful major rebuilding effort. Athletic Director Chuck Burch remarked, "We are grateful for the resurgence Chris created here at Gardner-Webb. He will be sorely missed, both on and off the court." Every senior he coached during his three years there earned a degree.

After one year as an assistant coach, Holtmann was named interim head coach on October 2, 2014, when Miller took a medical leave of absence. As interim coach, he guided Butler to a 10–4 start including a third-place finish in the Battle 4 Atlantis tournament. On the basis of the strong start, Butler was ranked as high as #15 in the AP Poll. On January 2, 2015, the interim tag was removed and Holtmann became the 23rd head coach of the Butler University men's basketball team. Announcing the decision, athletic director Barry Collier said Holtmann had "coached successfully in a difficult situation" and embodied The Butler Way as interim coach.

Upon receiving the job, Holtmann commented "The Butler Way resonates with who I am, who I want to be, who I'm trying to be, and with my family and our values."

Jeff Goodman of ESPN has described Holtmann as "a guy who just flat-out gets it. He has a tremendous work ethic, connects with his players, can recruit and also knows the game." Recruiting expert Dave Telep said Holtmann "has always done a good job with his [player] evaluations" and said few coaches work harder than him. During his career, Holtmann has recruited seven all-conference players. Thirteen players he coached or recruited have gone on to play professionally.

The Bulldogs surged into the polls in the early portion of the 2016–17 season, beating eventual NCAA Tournament teams Northwestern, Vanderbilt, Cincinnati, Arizona, Bucknell, and Vermont en route to an 11–1 non-conference start. Holtmann won Big East Coach of the Year honors after guiding the Bulldogs to a second-place finish (they were picked in the preseason to finish sixth), which included a season sweep of defending champion Villanova. Butler's 12–6 mark in conference play was the best of their four-season history in the Big East. The Bulldogs also earned a 4th seed, their highest seed in program history, in the 2017 NCAA tournament.

=== Ohio State ===
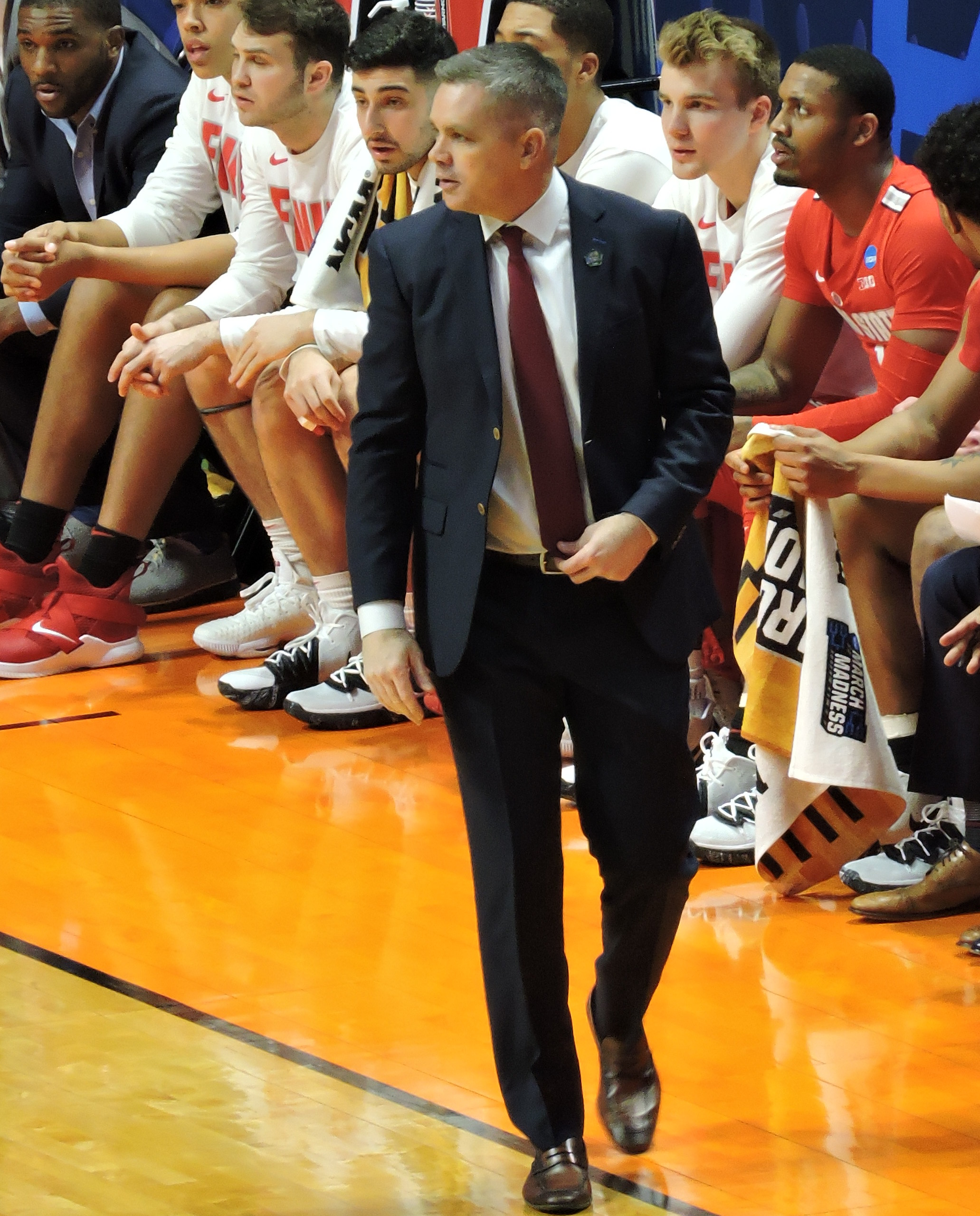
Holtmann coaching Ohio State in 2019

Holtmann became the 14th head coach in Ohio State history on June 9, 2017, replacing Thad Matta.

In 2017–18, the Buckeyes recorded home wins over Michigan and No. 1 Michigan State, along with a road victory at No. 3 Purdue, the Boilermakers’ only home loss of the season. Holtmann was named the 2018 Big Ten Coach of the Year after leading the Buckeyes to a 25–9 overall record, a second-place finish in the Big Ten regular-season standings (15–3). The Buckeyes were led by Big Ten Player of the Year Keita Bates-Diop. The season ended on a somber note as the Buckeyes were eliminated in the second round of the 2018 NCAA tournament by Gonzaga.

In 2018–19, Holtmann's Buckeyes went 20–15. As an 11-seed the Buckeyes knocked off 6-seed Iowa State to advance to the second round of the 2019 NCAA tournament, before being eliminated by Houston.

The 2019–20 season was cut short with the cancellation of the 2020 Big Ten and NCAA Tournaments. The Buckeyes posted an overall record of 21–10, which included four wins vs. Top 10 opponents (Villanova, at North Carolina, Kentucky and Maryland). Ohio State finished tied for fifth in the Big Ten at 11–9.

In a season shortened by COVID-19 implications, the 2020–21 Buckeyes went 21–10 record overall. Ohio State finished tied for fifth in the B1G (12–8) and reached the championship game of the 2021 Big Ten Tournament. Ohio State appeared in the AP Top 10 for the final seven weeks of the season and earned a #2 seed in the 2021 NCAA Tournament, only to lose to 15-seed Oral Roberts in the first round.

The 2021–22 Buckeyes posted a 20–12 record and 12–8 conference record. The team lost in the second round of the 2022 NCAA tournament to Villanova.

Holtmann became the second Ohio State coach to win 20 or more games in his first five seasons in Columbus, joining Thad Matta (who did so in his first twelve seasons, from 2005 to 2016). However, he never won a conference championship, and his teams struggled in postseason play: through his first 14 seasons as a head coach, his teams have never won a conference tournament, and have advanced beyond the first weekend of the NCAA tournament only once, leading to some criticism from fans.

The criticism of Holtmann continued in the 2022–23 season, as after starting the season with 10 wins in 13 games, the Buckeyes went into an extended tailspin, losing 14 of 15 games. On February 12, the Buckeyes scored just 41 points in a home loss to Michigan State, the program's lowest point total in 27 years. The Buckeyes finished the season 16–19 overall and 5–15 in Big Ten play.

On February 14, 2024, following a school record-setting 18-game road losing streak, Holtmann was fired midway through the 2023–24 season. Assistant coach Jake Diebler took over coaching duties.

=== DePaul ===
In March 2024, Holtmann was named the new head coach of the DePaul Blue Demons on a six-year deal. Chris Holtmann created the only coaching staff in the country that has 5 coaches with head coaching experience. Chris Holtmann (Gardner Webb, Butler Ohio State), Lavall Jordan(Milwaukee, Butler), Bryan Mullins (Southern Illinois), Jack Owens (Miami OH), and Brandon Bailey (Maine Red Claws). Holtmann brought in a top 5 freshman scorer in Jacob Meyer, who is the team leader in points through 11 games with 14.4 points per game. He also got Conor Enright from Drake. Through 11 games, Holtmann has the Blue Demons with an 8–3 record. They are 0–2 in Big East play with losses to Providence and St. John's.

== Personal life ==
Holtmann is married to his wife, Lori (née Bedi), and they have a daughter, born in 2010.

== Head coaching record ==
Record table
Season	Team	Overall	Conference	Standing	Postseason
Gardner–Webb Runnin' Bulldogs (Big South Conference) (2010–2013)
2010–11	Gardner–Webb	11–21	6–12	9th	
2011–12	Gardner–Webb	12–20	6–12	10th	
2012–13	Gardner–Webb	21–13	11–5	2nd (South)	CIT First Round
Gardner-Webb:		44–54 (.449)	23–29 (.442)		
Butler Bulldogs (Big East Conference) (2014–2017)
2014–15	Butler	23–11	12–6	T–2nd	NCAA Division I Round of 32
2015–16	Butler	22–11	10–8	T–4th	NCAA Division I Round of 32
2016–17	Butler	25–9	12–6	2nd	NCAA Division I Sweet 16
Butler:		70–31 (.693)	34–20 (.630)		
Ohio State Buckeyes (Big Ten Conference) (2017–2024)
2017–18	Ohio State	25–9	15–3	T–2nd	NCAA Division I Round of 32
2018–19	Ohio State	20–15	8–12	T–8th	NCAA Division I Round of 32
2019–20	Ohio State	21–10	11–9	T–5th	Postseason canceled due to COVID-19
2020–21	Ohio State	21–10	12–8	5th	NCAA Division I Round of 64
2021–22	Ohio State	20–12	12–8	T–4th	NCAA Division I Round of 32
2022–23	Ohio State	16–19	5–15	13th	
2023–24	Ohio State	14–11	4–10		
Ohio State:		137–86 (.614)	67–65 (.508)		
DePaul Blue Demons (Big East Conference) (2024–present)
2024–25	DePaul	14–20	4–16	10th	CBC First Round
2025–26	DePaul	16–16	8–12	6th	
2026–27	DePaul	5-0			
DePaul:		35–36 (.493)	12–28 (.300)		
Total:		286–207 (.580)			
