= Zed Key =

American basketball player (born 2002)

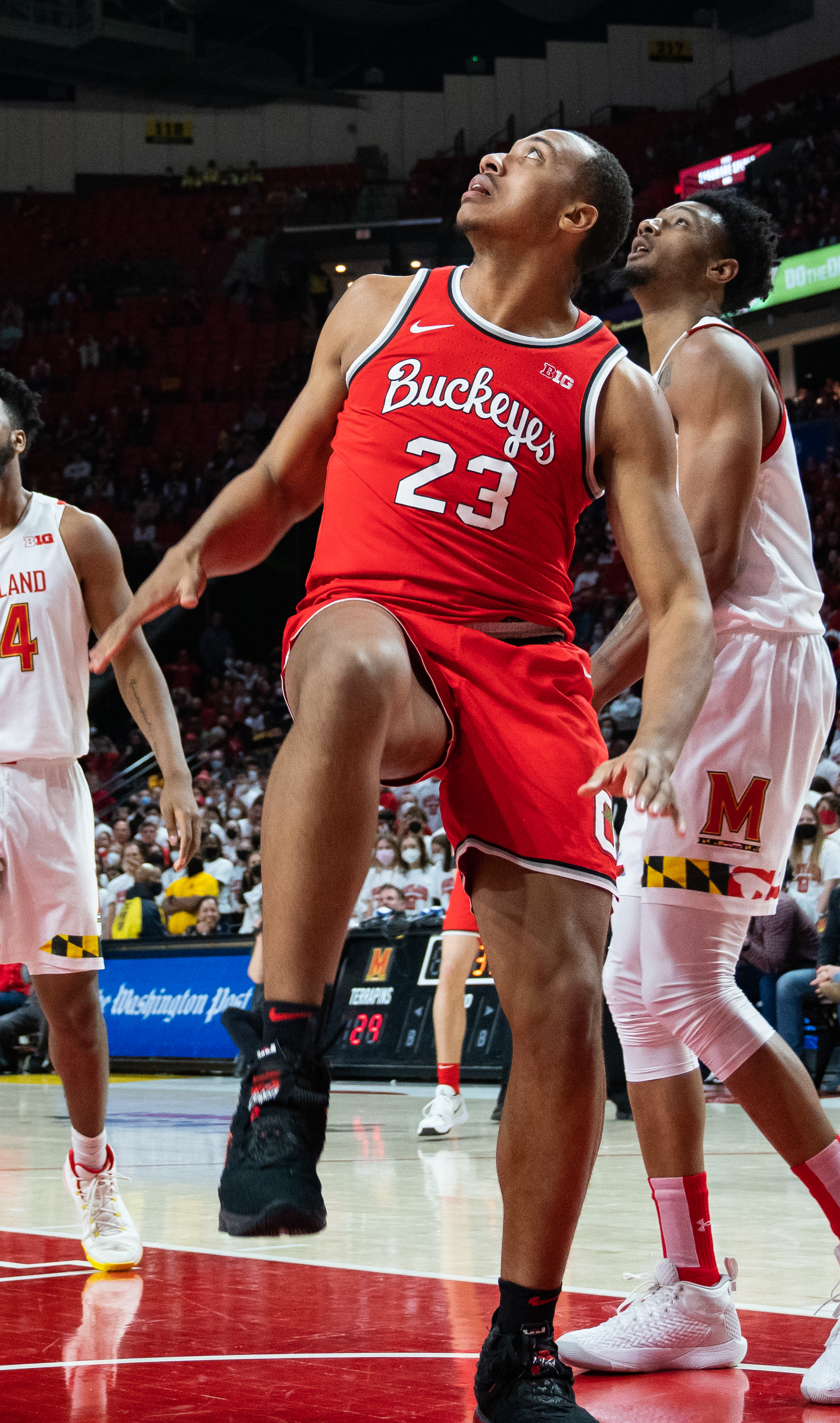
- Key in 2022

No. 23 – BK Pardubice
- Position: Power forward / center
- League: NBL Czech Republic

Personal information
- Born: April 4, 2002 (age 24)
- Listed height: 6 ft 8 in (2.03 m)
- Listed weight: 245 lb (111 kg)

Career information
- High school: Long Island Lutheran (Brookville, New York)
- College: Ohio State (2020–2024); Dayton (2024–2025)
- NBA draft: 2025: undrafted
- Playing career: 2025–present

Career history
- 2025–present: BK Pardubice

Zed Key (born April 4, 2002) is an American professional basketball player for BK Pardubice of the NBL Czech Republic. He played college basketball for the Ohio State Buckeyes and Dayton Flyers.

== Early life ==
Key was born on April 4, 2002. He was raised in Bay Shore and went to Brentwood HS through his sophomore season and to Long Island Lutheran High School in Brookville, New York as a junior and senior. With teammate and future Illinois point guard André Curbelo, Long Island Lutheran was one of the best high school programs in the country. In his junior season, Long Island Lutheran won the New York Class AA state championship. He averaged 18 points and 8.7 rebounds in his senior season. In wins over national powerhouses Sierra Canyon High School and The Patrick School, Key had standout performances, scoring 25 and 37 points, respectively.

Key was rated as a three and four-star recruit and ranked as the fourth best player in New York. On September 22, 2019, Key committed to Ohio State over offers from teams such as Florida, Illinois, and Wisconsin.

College recruiting
Name	Hometown	School	Height	Weight	Commit date
Zed Key; PF	Bay Shore, NY	Long Island Lutheran (NY)	6 ft 7 in (2.01 m)	215 lb (98 kg)	Sep 22, 2019
Zed Key; PF	Recruit ratings: Rivals: 247Sports: ESPN: (80)				
Overall recruit ranking: Rivals: 113 247Sports: 155 ESPN: N/A
Note: In many cases, Scout, Rivals, 247Sports, On3, and ESPN may conflict in their listings of height and weight.; In these cases, the average was taken. ESPN grades are on a 100-point scale.; Sources: "Ohio State 2020 Basketball Commitments". Rivals.; "2020 Ohio State Buckeyes Recruiting Class". ESPN.; "2020 Team Ranking". Rivals.

== College career ==
Key started his college career off the bench during his freshman year, averaging 5.2 points and 3.4 rebounds per game. He played in all 31 games and totaled 22 blocks, trailing only E. J. Liddell on Ohio State. In a win over Cleveland State, he earned a double-double, scoring 12 points and pulling down 10 rebounds.

In his sophomore season, Key became a consistent starter. He scored a career-high 20 points as an unranked Ohio State upset Duke at home. Overall, he averaged 7.8 points and 5.4 rebounds per game in 23 starts for the Buckeyes.

On April 15, 2024, Key transferred to Dayton.

== Professional career ==
On October 1, 2026, he signed with BK Pardubice of the NBL Czech Republic.

== Career statistics ==
Legend
GP	Games played	GS	Games started	MPG	Minutes per game
FG%	Field goal percentage	3P%	3-point field goal percentage	FT%	Free throw percentage
RPG	Rebounds per game	APG	Assists per game	SPG	Steals per game
BPG	Blocks per game	PPG	Points per game	**Bold**	Career high

=== College ===
Year	Team	GP	GS	MPG	FG%	3P%	FT%	RPG	APG	SPG	BPG	PPG
2020–21	Ohio State	**31**	1	11.7	**.616**	.000	.551	3.4	.3	.1	.7	5.2
2021–22	Ohio State	29	**23**	19.8	.561	.000	.581	5.6	.5	.2	.8	7.8
2022–23	Ohio State	25	**23**	**24.8**	.550	**.292**	**.659**	**7.5**	**.8**	**.6**	**1.0**	**10.8**
Career		88	47	18.5	.570	.292	.607	5.5	.5	.3	.8	7.9
