= Jackson High School (Stark County, Ohio) =

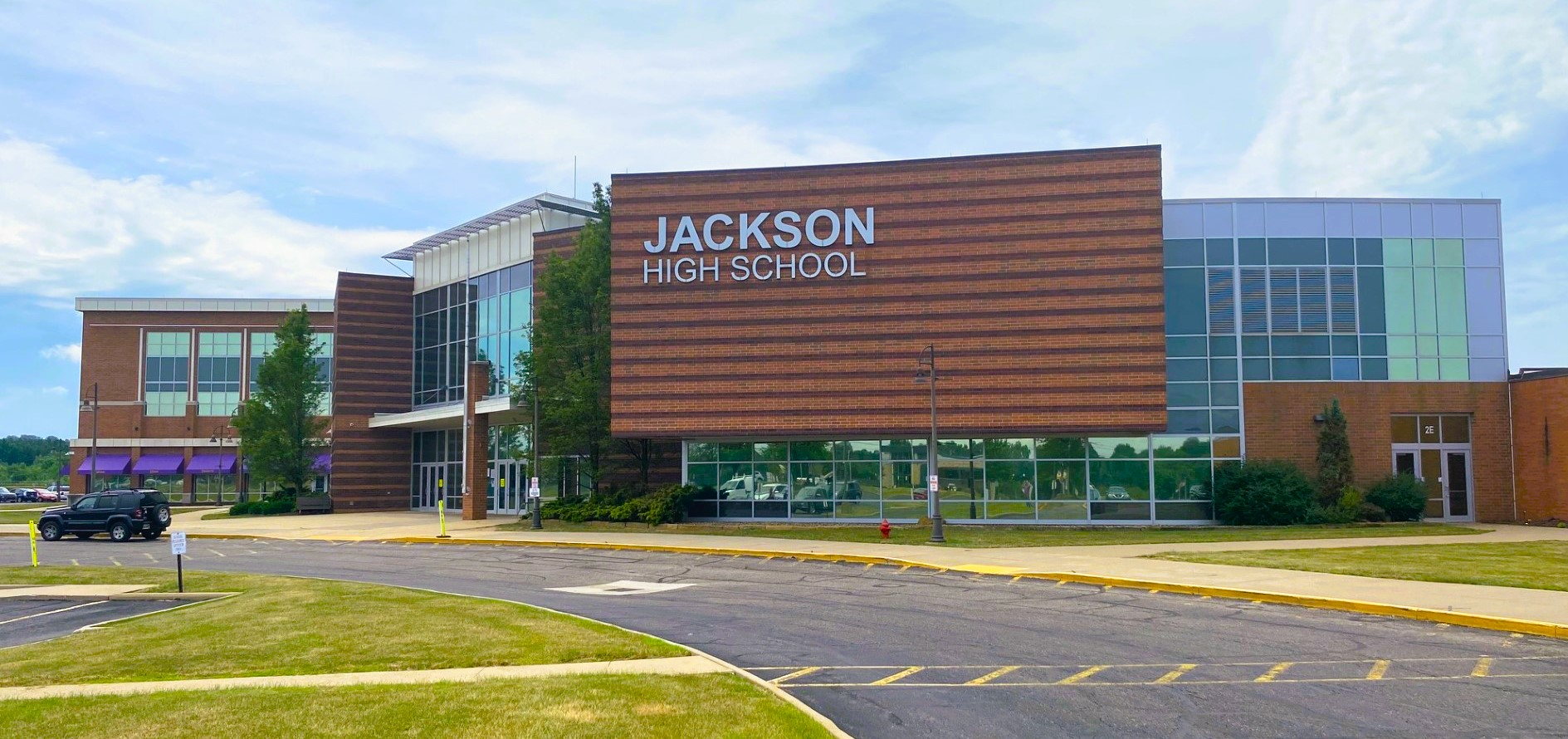

Location
- 7600 Fulton Drive NW; Massillon, Ohio 44646; United States; 40.861083°N 81.489716°W

Information
- School type: Public
- Motto: "Hard work is not a form of punishment—it is a solution to everything you want to do in life." -Dick Vermeil
- Established: 1930
- School district: Jackson Local School District
- Principal: Matt Ziders
- Teaching staff: 91.60 (FTE)
- Grades: 9-12
- Enrollment: 1,881 (2024-2025)
- Student to teacher ratio: 20.53
- Language: English
- Colors: Purple and Gold
- Athletics conference: Federal League
- Sports: Baseball, Cross Country, Football, Wrestling, Basketball, Golf, Lacrosse, Soccer, Volleyball, Softball, Tennis, Track and Field
- Mascot: Polar bear
- Team name: Jackson Polar Bears
- Rivals: Hoover High School (Ohio); Lake High School
- Website: jhs.jackson.stark.k12.oh.us

Jackson High School is a public high school located in Jackson Township, Ohio, United States, near Massillon. Part of the Jackson Local School District, it serves grades 9 through 12. The school's colors are purple, gold, white, and black, and the athletic teams are known as the Polar Bears.

== Academics ==
Jackson High School is ranked the 57th best public high school within Ohio, and 1,605th nationally as of 2024. Students have the opportunity to take Advanced Placement® course work and exams. The AP® participation rate at Jackson High School is 48 percent - with 35 percent passing at least one exam. At the state level, 87 percent of students met established thresholds of achievement on state proficiency tests.

In 2006, Jackson High School was rated "academically excellent" by the Ohio State Board of Education, scoring 110 and meeting 12 of 12 academic achievement indicators. The Jackson Local School district scored 106.9, making it the highest scoring public school district in Stark and several surrounding counties. In 2005 and 2006, Jackson High School was named to Newsweek's list of the top 1,000 schools in America. In 2015, Jackson High School was ranked as the 33rd best public high school in the state of Ohio. US News also ranked Jackson High School as the 870th best public high school in the nation for 2015.

== Athletics ==
Jackson High School is a founding member school of the Federal League, a high school athletic conference in Ohio.

=== OHSAA State championships ===
- Boys' basketball: 2010, 2017
- Baseball: 2014, 2017
- Boys' cross country: 2023

Non-OHSAA sanctioned state championships

- Cheerleading: 2024, 2025, 2026

==== National championships ====
- Cheerleading: 2025

==== Individual team championships ====
- Boys' tennis singles: 1994, 2015
- Wrestling: 1983, 1984, 1985, 2000, 2002, 2018

== Extracurricular activities ==
=== Music ===
The Jackson Marching Band produces a show yearly (along with one black light halftime show). The band has marched in the Tournament of Roses Parade (1982 and 1998), Macy's Thanksgiving Day Parade (1999), Cotton Bowl Parade, Orange Bowl Parade (1992), Fiesta Bowl Parade and pre-game (1994), and Walt Disney World Christmas Day Parade (1987, 1991, 1995 and 1998). The band has also traveled to Hawaii, Universal Studios in Orlando, Florida, and Phoenix, Arizona. In 2009 the Marching Band traveled to New Orleans to play in the Sugar Bowl halftime show. In 2012, the band traveled to Orlando to play in the Disney Thanksgiving Day Parade. In March 2014 the band successfully traveled to China. While in China the band performed on the Great Wall of China, along with sightseeing, the band visited their sister school in Jiaozhou, Qingdao. The band performed in a grand concert tour with their sister school. The band department has four bands, a Freshman band, two concert bands, and Symphony band. All four bands participate in competitions sponsored by the Ohio Music Educators Association.

In 2018, the band took a trip to Ireland and marched in the St. Patrick's Day Parade in Ireland. In 2021, the band participated in the first Ohio State University skull session in nearly two years on September 11, and traveled to Disney World and marched in the Magic Kingdom Parade over the district's spring break in 2022. In November 2023, the band traveled to Columbus, Ohio to take part in the Buckeye Invitational, hosted by the Ohio State University Marching Band, and sponsored by the Ohio Music Educators Association. The band also traveled to Honolulu, Hawaii to march in the Waikiki Holiday Parade as well as play at the USS Missouri Memorial.

The choral department has six choirs, which compete in competitions sponsored by the Ohio Music Educators Association. Jackson's show choir, the Jacks-N-Jills, performs throughout the region. The Choral Department puts on the school's annual musical production and the choir takes a semi-annual trip to Pennsylvania and New York City.

=== Art ===
Jackson High School an arts program called Jackson School for the Arts or JSA. Students are accepted into the arts school as freshmen and sometimes sophomores and follow the program until senior year. In the school of the arts students must meet GPA requirements, audition for dance classes and participate in technical and performing areas. In their senior year, students are also required to complete an internship in a field relating to their area of concentration.

=== Global Studies ===
Jackson High School has an global studies program called Jackson Academy for Global Studies (JAGS). Students are accepted into JAGS as freshmen and sometimes sophomores and follow the program until senior year. In the academy of global studies, students must meet GPA requirements, take 2 semesters for Model UN and participate in accelerated classes alongside enhancing global understanding. There are classes which help with Speech and Debate, most notably a class titled "Intro into Speech and Debate" which is a 1/2 year course. In their senior year, students are also required to complete a senior capstone project.

=== Speech and debate ===
Jackson also offers a speech and debate program, where students can be a part of the National Forensics League. The team won state championships in the Ohio High School Speech League's 2010, 2012, and 2017 tournaments.

== Notable alumni ==
- Dillon Dingler - Professional baseball player in Major League Baseball on the Detroit Tigers.
- Carlin Isles - Professional rugby union player, and Olympic athlete.
- Mark Kozelek - Professional singer, guitarist, and record producer.
- Shawn Lutz - College football coach.
- Kyle Nicolas Professional baseball player in Major League Baseball on the Pittsburgh Pirates.
- Kyle Young - Former College basketball player for the Ohio State Buckeyes.
- Taylor Mikesell - Professional basketball player.
