= Glenn M. Curtis =

American basketball coach

Biographical details
- Born: March 4, 1894; Eminence, Indiana, U.S.
- Died: November 24, 1958 (aged 64); Martinsville, Indiana, U.S.

Playing career
- 1908–1912: Indiana State
- Position: Guard

Coaching career (HC unless noted)
- 1917–1918: Lebanon HS
- 1918: Mooresville HS
- 1919–1938: Martinsville HS
- 1938–1946: Indiana State
- 1946–1947: Detroit Falcons
- 1947–1948: Indianapolis Jets

Accomplishments and honors

Awards
- Indiana Basketball Hall of Fame (1964)

Glenn M. Curtis (March 4, 1894 – November 24, 1958) was an American basketball coach. He was the head coach at Indiana State University from 1938 to 1946. He won 122 games and led the Sycamores to three NAIA Tournaments, reaching the national title game in 1946. The Sycamores also won the Midwest Invitational Tournament in 1946. His career collegiate record is 122–45 (.724). He won four IHSAA State Titles; leading the 1917–18 Lebanon Tigers to their second title; he later led the Martinsville Artesians to three titles. His most famous high school player was John Wooden, who later became a HAll of Fame college coach who won 10 championships with UCLA.

== Head coaching notes ==
=== Indiana State ===
He succeeded Wally Marks and led the Sycamores to eight consecutive winning seasons and three berths in the NAIA Men's Basketball Championships (1942, 1943 & 1946); reaching the national quarterfinals in 1942 and the title game in 1946. He finished his career as the leader in wins and then recommended his old high school player and protégé John Wooden as his successor. Additionally, he served as the athletic director during his coaching tenure. In 1998, Curtis was inducted into the Indiana State University Athletics Hall of Fame.

== High school ==
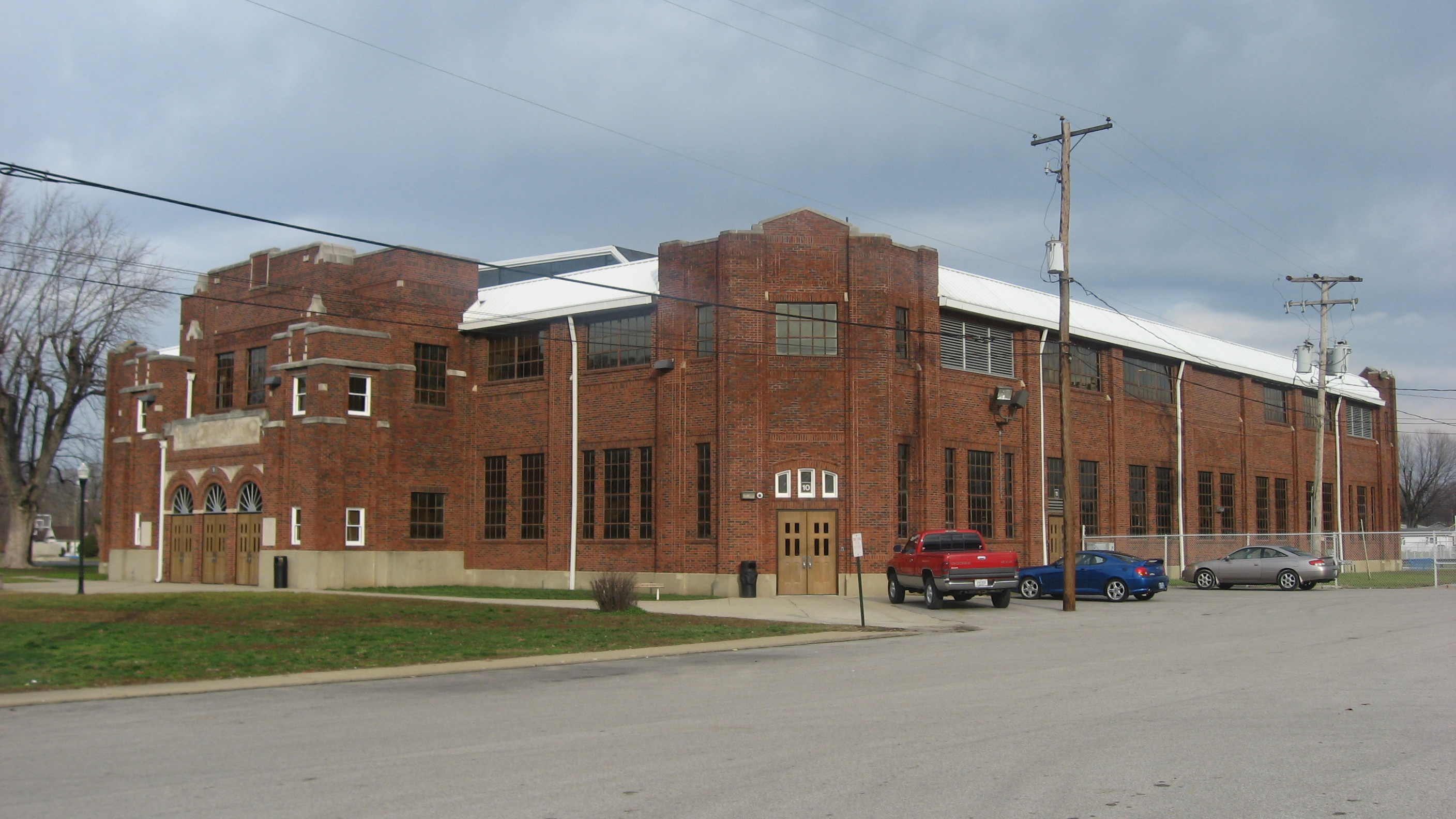
Martinsville's high school basketball gymnasium

Prior to becoming a collegiate coach, Curtis, known as the 'Ole Fox' by his peers, spent 21 years as an Indiana High School coach. His first year as head coach came at Lebanon High School in Lebanon, Indiana, the Tigers were coming off their first State Title; Curtis led to their second title. During his one-year stint, he went 28–2 (.933) and won the 1918 state championship. He then moved to Mooresville where he spent one semester, coaching approximately 10 games. At the Christmas break, he moved to nearby Martinsville.

His Martinsville Artesians won 396 games and lost 139 (.740). During his tenure (1919 to 1938), they won 16 sectional championships, 14 regional championships and three state championships. Coaching players such as John Wooden and fellow Indiana Basketball Hall of Famers Lester Reynolds and Arnold Suddith, he won state titles in 1924, 1927, and 1933, with Wooden the star in 1927. The Artesians lost the state championship in 1926 and 1928. In the five years from 1924 through 1928, they were in the state championship game every year but 1925.

He was the first Indiana high school coach (and one of four) to win four state championships. Curtis was the co-head coach with Tony Hinkle of the first Indiana all-star team to play Kentucky and he also coached six Indianapolis Star all-star teams. He never had a losing season as a coach, and in 19 years at Martinsville, his teams won 16 sectional championships (the opening round of the state playoffs) and 14 regional championships (the equivalent to making the NCAA Sweet Sixteen.)

He returned to the high school ranks as the Martinsville Superintendent of Schools from 1948 to 1955. Curtis died in 1958.

The Martinsville High School Gymnasium was named in his honor in 1959.

== Professional leagues ==
He moved on to the professional ranks, briefly coaching the Detroit Falcons of the Basketball Association of America (BAA). Curtis was fired midseason after posted a 12–22 record, his first losing season as a head coach at any level. He later coached the Indianapolis Jets of the National Basketball League for one season and finished with a record of 24–35. They still qualified for the playoffs but lost the opening round series one game to three in a best-of-four series. The Jets then joined the BAA but Curtis retired from coaching and returned to Martinsville as the Superintendent of Schools.

=== Indiana High School All-Stars ===
He was the first head coach for the Indiana All-Stars (an annual all-state team of seniors only, sponsored by the Indianapolis Star. The team faces a similar team from Kentucky; game proceeds are donated to charity. Curtis led the All-Stars to victory in each game he coached (6–0); he coached renowned players such as Johnny Wilson, Max Pearsey, Clyde Lovellette, Ray Ragelis and Bill Garrett.

== Head coaching record ==
=== High school ===
Years	School	Wins	Losses	Pct.	Highlight
1917–18	Lebanon Tigers	28	2	.933	IHSAA State Champion (1918)
1918	Mooresville Pioneers	unk.	unk.	unk.	Coached ~10 games
1919–1938	Martinsville Artesians	396	139	.740	IHSAA State Champion (1924, 1927, 1933)

21 seasons 3 schools 424–141; 4 State Titles (1918, 1924, 1927, 1933)

=== College ===
Record table
Season	Team	Overall	Conference	Standing	Postseason
Indiana State Sycamores (Indiana Intercollegiate Conference) (1938–1946)
1938–39	Indiana State	10–9	3–9		
1939–40	Indiana State	15–3	8–2		
1940–41	Indiana State	11–8	2–2		
1941–42	Indiana State	17–4	5–1		NAIA Third Round
1942–43	Indiana State	13–4	5–2		NAIA First Round
1943–44	Indiana State	17–4	6–4		
1944–45	Indiana State	18–6	5–3		
1945–46	Indiana State	21–7	4–2	1st	NAIA National Runner-up
Indiana State:		122–45 (.731)	38–25 (.603)		
Total:		122–45 (.731)			
National champion Postseason invitational champion Conference regular season champion Conference regular season and conference tournament champion Division regular season champion Division regular season and conference tournament champion Conference tournament champion

=== NBA ===
Legend
Regular season	G	Games coached	W	Games won	L	Games lost	W–L %	Win–loss %
Playoffs	PG	Playoff games	PW	Playoff wins	PL	Playoff losses	PW–L %	Playoff win–loss %

Team	Year	G	W	L	W–L%	Finish	PG	PW	PL	PW–L%	Result
DET	1946–47	34	12	22	.353	(replaced)	—	—	—	—	—
