= Ray Crowe =

Basketball coach and public official (1915–2003)

Ray P. Crowe

Member of the Indiana House of Representatives from the 26th district
- In office November 9, 1966 – November 7, 1972 Serving with William Ruckelshaus
- Preceded by: Robert V. Bridwell
- Succeeded by: n/a

Member of the Indiana House of Representatives from the 42nd district
- In office Nov. 8, 1972 – July 31, 1975 Serving with Paul E. Burkley, Donald T. Nelson
- Succeeded by: William L. Soards

Personal details
- Born: May 30, 1915 Whiteland, Indiana, U.S.
- Died: December 20, 2003 (aged 88) Indianapolis, Indiana, U.S.
- Party: Republican
- Spouse: Betty Ewing
- Education: University of Indianapolis
- Occupation: Basketball coach, politician, parks director

Ray Province Crowe (May 30, 1915 – December 20, 2003) was an American basketball coach, educator, school administrator, and Republican politician in Indianapolis, Indiana. He was the head basketball coach of Crispus Attucks High School from 1950 to 1957, after which he served another decade as the school's athletic director. His teams won the Indiana state basketball championship in 1955 and 1956, becoming the first all-black school to win a state championship in the country, and the first Indianapolis team to win the Hoosier state title. Crowe coached numerous Indiana All-Star players, including Oscar Robertson, Hallie Bryant, and Willie Meriweather, and was inducted into the Indiana Basketball Hall of Fame in 1968.

In 1966 Crowe became one of fifteen Republicans (of whom William Ruckelshaus gained national stature) sweeping out an equal number of Democrats to represent Indianapolis in the Indiana House of Representatives. During the nine years preceding his resignation from the legislature, Crowe rose to chair the House Education Committee. He was later assistant director of the Indiana Department of Public Instruction, director of the Indianapolis Department of Parks and Recreation, and served on the Indianapolis City-County Council.

Crowe's younger brother George Crowe became the first Indiana Mr. Basketball and a major league baseball player. The University of Indianapolis named a campus building "Ray & George Crowe Hall" in their honor.

== Early life and career ==
Ray Crowe was born and raised on a farm near Franklin, Indiana, one of ten children. He was the older brother of George Crowe, who was the first Indiana Mr. Basketball and a major league baseball player. Ray played basketball and baseball at Whiteland High School in Johnson County, the only black player on the team. He was a four-year letterman in basketball, twice the leading scorer and team captain, and a three-year letterman in baseball. Crowe then attended Indiana Central College (now known as the University of Indianapolis), where he earned nine letters in basketball, baseball, and track. He graduated in 1938 with a degree in education. After college and working as a sweeper at International Harvester, Crowe taught math and coached basketball at an Indianapolis grade school.

Despite growing up in an area with a large Ku Klux Klan membership, Crowe claimed to have never experienced discrimination. He maintained a stoic demeanor and responded to racial adversity by emphasizing discipline and achievement. "I don't talk a lot about being black and what all of that might or might not mean," Crowe stated."

== Crispus Attucks High ==
In 1950 Crowe was appointed head basketball coach at Crispus Attucks High School in Indianapolis after serving as an assistant coach there the previous two years. The school had been built in 1927 as a segregated institution for the city's growing population of African-American students, who were all required to enroll there. The school's faculty was all black, and most of its teachers and administrators had advanced degrees, as their opportunities were limited despite their accomplishments.

In his first year, Crowe guided Attucks to the final four of the 1951 Indiana state basketball tournament. The team featured three future inductees of the Indiana Basketball Hall of Fame: Hallie Bryant, Willie Gardner, and Bailey Robertson. All three would go on to play for the Harlem Globetrotters. Attucks finished the season 26–2 after losing in the state semi-finals to Evansville Reitz. In the 1954 state tournament, Attucks advanced to the state quarter-finals and lost to Milan, the team known as "The Milan Miracle." In the 1986 movie Hoosiers, which was inspired in part by that Milan team, Crowe had a nonspeaking role. He played the head coach of the fictional South Bend Central Bears in the film's final game.

In 1954–55, Attucks won the state championship, the first all-black school to win a state-sanctioned championship in the country, and the first Indianapolis team to win the Hoosier tourney. The team lost only once, at Connersville, in a game marred by a slippery court due to condensation. They won in the final against Gary Roosevelt — another segregated, all-black school — to finish the season 31–1.

In 1955–56, Attucks beat Lafayette Jefferson in the final to repeat as state champs, the first team to win the title undefeated, finishing 31–0 and riding a record 45-game winning streak. The championship squads were led by legend Oscar Robertson, a member of the Indiana Basketball Hall of Fame and the Naismith Memorial Basketball Hall of Fame. Robertson averaged 28 points per game in 1955–56, and 24 over his career at Attucks. He had a high game of 62 points, and he scored 39 in the 1956 final. His teammates on the championship squads included two other inductees of the Indiana Hall of Fame, Willie Merriweather and Bill Scott, and the team as a whole has also been inducted.

The state basketball championship in Indiana was held at Butler Fieldhouse (now called Hinkle Fieldhouse) in Indianapolis. A tradition was that the winner would ride in a procession to Monument Circle downtown for a celebration. When Attucks won its first title in 1955, the procession stopped at Monument Circle briefly, and Crowe was given the key to the city by the mayor, but it then continued to Northwestern Park, in a predominantly black neighborhood closer to Crispus Attucks High. Robertson expressed disappointment that the Attucks team was treated differently, telling his father, "they don't want us." The same route was followed after the 1956 championship. "[Officials] thought the blacks were going to tear the town up," Robertson later said, "and they thought the whites wouldn't like it." Nevertheless, celebration banquets were held to honor the teams at restaurants downtown where they would not ordinarily have been allowed to eat.

In 1956–57, the leaders of the championship teams had graduated, Attucks was a young and inexperienced squad, and the team was not expected to contend for the state championship. The team pulled together in the tournament, though, and made it to the championship game, losing to undefeated South Bend Central. Many, including Crowe, felt it was the best coaching job of his career. "In many ways," said Crowe, "it was my most satisfying year."

Crowe stepped down as head coach at the end of the 1957 season, finishing with a career record of 179–20 (.899). He became the athletic director at Crispus Attucks and named Bill Garrett as his successor as head coach. Garrett led Attucks to another state championship in 1959. Crowe remained at Attucks as athletic director from 1957 to 1967 when Garrett succeeded him again.

=== Attucks and race relations ===
Many believe that the success of Attucks helped racial relations in Indianapolis and eased integration of the public schools there, Robertson included. Attucks had initially been shunned by the public schools in Indianapolis and was only able to schedule small Catholic schools and teams from outside the city. The school did not have a suitable gym, so the team played most of their games on the road. This posed difficulties in itself. They generally could not find hotels or restaurants that would accommodate them, so they had to take their own food on road trips. Crowe and the school administration would try to shield the players from racial tensions, but it was often not possible. Crowe maintained a quiet, non-combative demeanor in the face of such challenges, determined to overcome adversity through discipline and achievement. If his players fell behind in their academics or got into trouble, they did not play, and all of his players graduated. The way the team comported itself gained the respect of the community and garnered fans both black and white.

Crowe coached a fast-breaking style of ball that went against the strict, regimented style prevalent in Indiana high school play at the time (illustrated in the movie Hoosiers). Taking advantage of his tall, fast, athletic players, his tactic was to get down the floor quickly and shoot before the defense was able to get set up. Attucks was entertaining to watch, and they began attracting large crowds to their games. They played their home games at Butler Fieldhouse and increasingly drew thousands, and soon other teams wanted to schedule them to benefit from larger attendance. Playing at Butler posed problems as well, though, as Attucks had low priority, leading to an erratic schedule. The team also faced questionable, likely racially motivated, officiating, including a number of incidents that even white fans found outrageous. Crowe would not complain and would tell his team they needed to build a large enough lead that bad calls could not affect the outcome. "The first ten points are for the refs," he would say, "the rest are for us."

The success of Attucks had tremendous significance for the black community in Indianapolis and beyond. They were compared to Jackie Robinson, Joe Louis, and the Harlem Globetrotters for gaining respect for black achievement in the sports world. Bobby Plump, star of the Milan Miracle team, noted that what Attucks achieved surpassed what his team had done. "When you break a barrier, that's significant," Plump said. "There was a lot more historical significance, I think, to what they did than what we did." The team could not wipe away race problems in Indianapolis, of course, but it certainly "influenced attitudes and ideas" about blacks, if not directly shaping policies and laws. Robertson stated that "[b]y us winning, it sped up the integration. I truly believe that us winning the state championship brought Indianapolis together."

== Public official ==
In 1966 Crowe was elected as one of fifteen Republicans representing the 26th District (Indianapolis) in the Indiana House of Representatives; sweeping out an equal number of Democrats who had represented the city in the 94th Assembly. Following the 1970 census redistricting, Crowe represented the smaller multi-member 42nd District (northern Indianapolis and Marion County) from 1972 until resigning in mid-1975. He was replaced by fellow Republican William Lyman Soards, who would likewise win re-election several times, surviving one redistricting. As chair of the House Education Committee, Crowe pushed for more meaningful integration of Indiana public schools. State law had allowed integration beginning in 1949, but in practice, very little mixing occurred. Some predominantly white schools had a small number of black students but rarely any black teachers; Attucks had no white students until 1971. Crowe worked to change that, and in 1969 court orders led to the reassignment of teachers and students to achieve fuller integration. Crowe later served as assistant director of the Indiana Department of Public Instruction.

Crowe directed the Indianapolis Department of Parks and Recreation from 1976 to 1979. From 1983 to 1987, he served on the Indianapolis City-County Council.

== Tributes and death ==
In 1987 Crowe was inducted into the Hall of Fame of the University of Indianapolis, his alma mater. In 2012 the school renamed a building on campus after Crowe and his brother, "Ray & George Crowe Hall." In 2009 a ceremony was held and a banner raised at Conseco Fieldhouse, the home venue of the Indiana Pacers, to honor Crowe's 1955 championship squad. In 2021, Clark-Pleasant Schools opened a new elementary school named Ray Crowe Elementary on Ray Crowe Way in Greenwood, Indiana.

Crowe died on December 20, 2003, at the age of 88, survived by his ex-wife, Betty Ewing Crowe, and their four children. A memorial service was held at Crispus Attucks High School, drawing a large, racially mixed crowd, including many of his former players. The memorial included a procession along the traditional route through Indianapolis taken by state high school basketball champions. "As the cars made their way around Monument Circle, Ray Crowe again became a symbol of the issue of race in Indiana. Unlike in 1955, however, this time whites and blacks traveled the road together."
