= Lester Reynolds =

American basketball player

Personal information
- Born: February 8, 1909 Columbus, Indiana
- Died: March 24, 1977 (aged 68) Indianapolis, Indiana
- Listed height: 6 ft 4 in (1.93 m)
- Listed weight: 205 lb (93 kg)

Career information
- High school: Martinsville (Martinsville, Indiana)
- College: Indiana State (1927–1931)
- NBA draft: 1931: undrafted
- Position: Guard

Career highlights
- All-American – Helms (1930); Indiana Basketball Hall of Fame (1972); 3× All-State (Indiana) (1925–1927)

Lester Reynolds (born February 8, 1909) was a former American college basketball All-American player who played for Indiana State of the IIC . He was a point guard.

== High school career ==
Reynolds was a 2-time State Champion and a 3-time All-State guard for the Martinsville Artesians; coached by Glenn M. Curtis and teaming with John Wooden and Arnold Suddith, Reynolds led the Artesians to the 1927 IHSAA Championship. Reynolds was the floor general, feeding Wooden for numerous baskets as the Artesians took the title 26–23 over Muncie High.

The Artesians were the 1926 IHSAA Finalist, losing a close battle to Marion High and future Hall of Famer, Stretch Murphy 30–23.

Reynolds was a reserve guard for the 1924 IHSAA Championship as the Artesians nipped the Frankfort Hot Dogs coached by the legendary Everett Case, 36–30

An all-around athlete, Reynolds placed 2nd in the shot put during the 1926 IHSAA State track & field meet.

== College career ==
Reynolds played college basketball for head coach Wally Marks' Indiana State Sycamores, from 1927–28 through 1930–31. He helped lead the Sycamores to a 4-yr record of 50-19 (.725) and a conference record of 15-8 (.652). The Sycamores won the 1929-30 ICC title with a conference record of 8–2.

== Awards and accomplishments ==
=== College ===
IHSAA Champion (1927)
IHSAA Champion (1924)
IHSAA Finalist (1926)
