= Charles Cummings (basketball) =

American basketball coach (1908–2003)

Biographical details
- Born: September 3, 1908; Webb City, Missouri, U.S.
- Died: March 4, 2003 (aged 94); Anderson, Indiana, U.S.
- Education: Ozark Wesleyan College; Indiana University Bloomington

Coaching career (HC unless noted)
- 1928–1929: Carterville HS (MO)
- 1929–1936: Webb City (MO)
- 1936–1941: Crawfordsville HS (IN) (assistant)
- 1941–1942: Crawfordsville HS (IN)
- 1942–1946: Anderson HS (IN)
- 1948–1949: Boston University

Administrative career (AD unless noted)
- 1963–1972: Anderson HS (IN)

Head coaching record
- Overall: 6–12 (college)

Accomplishments and honors

Championships
- Indiana High School Boys Basketball Tournament (1946)

Charles Leslie Cummings (September 3, 1908 – March 4, 2003) was an American basketball coach who won the 1946 Indiana High School Boys Basketball Tournament at Anderson High School and spent one season as the head men's basketball coach at Boston University.

== Biography ==
Cummings played football, basketball and baseball at Webb City High School before graduating in 1925. During his junior year at Ozark Wesleyan College, Cummings became the head football and basketball coach at Carterville High School in Carterville, Missouri. After graduating, Cummings returned to Webb City High School, where he coached football and basketball teams to several conference championships.

In 1936, Cummings enrolled in the master's program at Indiana University Bloomington. In 1937, he became the head football coach at Crawfordsville High School. He was Crawfordsville's head basketball coach during the 1941–42 season and led the team to a 29–12 record.

In 1942, Cummings became the head basketball coach at Anderson High School in Anderson, Indiana. He compiled a 78–26 record in his four seasons at Anderson and his teams made the single-class Final Four three times. His 1945–1946 team, led by Indiana Mr. Basketball Jumping Johnny Wilson, won the Indiana High School Boys Basketball Tournament. After winning the title, Cummings resigned to enter private business.

In 1948, Cummings returned to coaching at Boston University. His team amassed a 6–12 record and he resigned after one season to return to private business.

In 1963, Cummings returned to the Anderson school system as athletic director. He held this position for nine years, during which time he oversaw the start of the girls athletic program.

Cummings remained in Anderson until his death on March 4, 2003.
