= Mike Flynn (basketball) =

American basketball player (born 1953)

Personal information
- Born: July 31, 1953 (age 73) Casablanca, Morocco
- Listed height: 6 ft 2 in (1.88 m)
- Listed weight: 180 lb (82 kg)

Career information
- High school: Jeffersonville (Jeffersonville, Indiana)
- College: Kentucky (1972–1975)
- NBA draft: 1975: 7th round, 113th overall pick
- Drafted by: Philadelphia 76ers
- Playing career: 1975–1983
- Position: Shooting guard / point guard
- Number: 44

Career history
- 1975–1978: Indiana Pacers
- 1980–1983: Alviks BK

Career highlights
- First-team Parade All-American (1971); Indiana Mr. Basketball (1971)

Career ABA and NBA statistics
- Points: 1,317 (6.2 ppg)
- Rebounds: 437 (2.1 rpg)
- Assists: 454 (2.2 apg)
- Stats at NBA.com
- Stats at Basketball Reference

Michael David Flynn (born July 31, 1953) is an American former professional basketball player. He played as a guard.

Flynn was born in Casablanca, Morocco but grew up in Jeffersonville, Indiana, USA. He attended Jeffersonville High School, where he was Indiana's Mr. Basketball and a Parade All-American in 1971. Flynn then played at the University of Kentucky, where he scored 835 points in three seasons and reached the NCAA Men's Division I Basketball Championship in 1975 before losing to UCLA. During the late 1970s and early 1980s he competed professionally for the Indiana Pacers and in Sweden.

Flynn was inducted into the Indiana Basketball Hall of Fame in 2005.

Flynn also pitched in the Little League World Series in 1965 as a member of the George Rogers Clark All-Stars of Jeffersonville, IN.

Flynn has four children: three sons, and one daughter. B.J. and Michael Flynn played for the University of Louisville, while Marcus Flynn played for Bellarmine University.
