= David Glascock =

American basketball player and coach

Biographical details
- Born: July 30, 1885; Crawfordsville, Indiana, U.S.
- Died: February 16, 1969 (aged 83); Crawfordsville, Indiana, U.S.

Playing career
- 1908–1912: Wabash

Coaching career (HC unless noted)
- 1909–1911: Crawfordsville HS
- 1924–1927: Indiana State
- 1932–1933: Indiana State

Head coaching record
- Overall: 33–32 (college)

Accomplishments and honors

Championships
- Indiana state championship (1911)

Awards
- Indiana Basketball Hall of Fame (1966)

David A. Glascock (July 30, 1885 – February 16, 1969) was an American basketball coach. He was the head basketball coach at Indiana State University from 1924 to 1927 and again for 1932–33 season, compiling a record of 33–32.

A United States Army veteran of World War I, he was a First Lt in Battery "E" of the 323rd Field Artillery; he was decorated for his actions at Verdun. He held an AM (1915) from Indiana University and a PhD from Columbia University.

== Coaching career ==
Prior to becoming a collegiate coach, Glascock spent 13 years as a high school coach. His first job came as head coach at his alma mater, Crawfordsville High School in Crawfordsville, Indiana. In his first year, the Athenians went 13–1 and claimed the mythical state championship over rival, Lebanon Senior High School due to a higher winning percentage; though Lebanon had more wins. In 1911, Crawfordsville won 16 games and lost 2 (.889) and the first Indiana High School Boys Basketball Tournament. During his this two-year stint, he went 29–3 (.906) He then moved to coaching jobs in Illinois, South Dakota and Utah.

Glascock returned to Indiana as the head coach of the Indiana State Sycamores men's basketball varsity team from 1924 to 1927 and again in 1932–33. He was named a full professor in the physical education department in 1947; he was named chairman of the department in 1948 and retired in 1952. He held positions as the track & field and cross-country coach, as well as the freshman basketball coach, in addition to teaching courses on physical education during his tenure. Prior to his return to Indiana, he served as the athletic director at Northern State University in Aberdeen, South Dakota in 1915.

== Honors ==
- 1966 Indiana Basketball Hall of Fame
- 1982 Indiana State University Hall of Fame
- Wabash College Hall of Fame
- 2003 Montgomery County Basketball Hall of Fame

== Head coaching record ==
=== High school ===
Years	School	Wins	Losses	Pct.	Highlight
1909–10	Crawfordsville Athenians	13	1	.929	Mythical State Champion
1910–11	Crawfordsville Athenians	16	2	.889	IHSAA State Championship
Total:		29–3 (.906)			
National champion Postseason invitational champion Conference regular season champion Conference regular season and conference tournament champion Division regular season champion Division regular season and conference tournament champion Conference tournament champion

=== College ===
Record table
Season	Team	Overall	Conference	Standing	Postseason
Indiana State Sycamores (Indiana Intercollegiate Conference) (1924–1933)
1924–25	Indiana State	11–4	6–2		none
1925–26	Indiana State	9–9	1–4		none
1926–27	Indiana State	3–13	2–8		none
1932–33	Indiana State	10–6	5–4		none
Total:		33–32 (.508)			
National champion Postseason invitational champion Conference regular season champion Conference regular season and conference tournament champion Division regular season champion Division regular season and conference tournament champion Conference tournament champion
