= Crispus Attucks High School =

Public magnet school in Indianapolis, Indiana, US

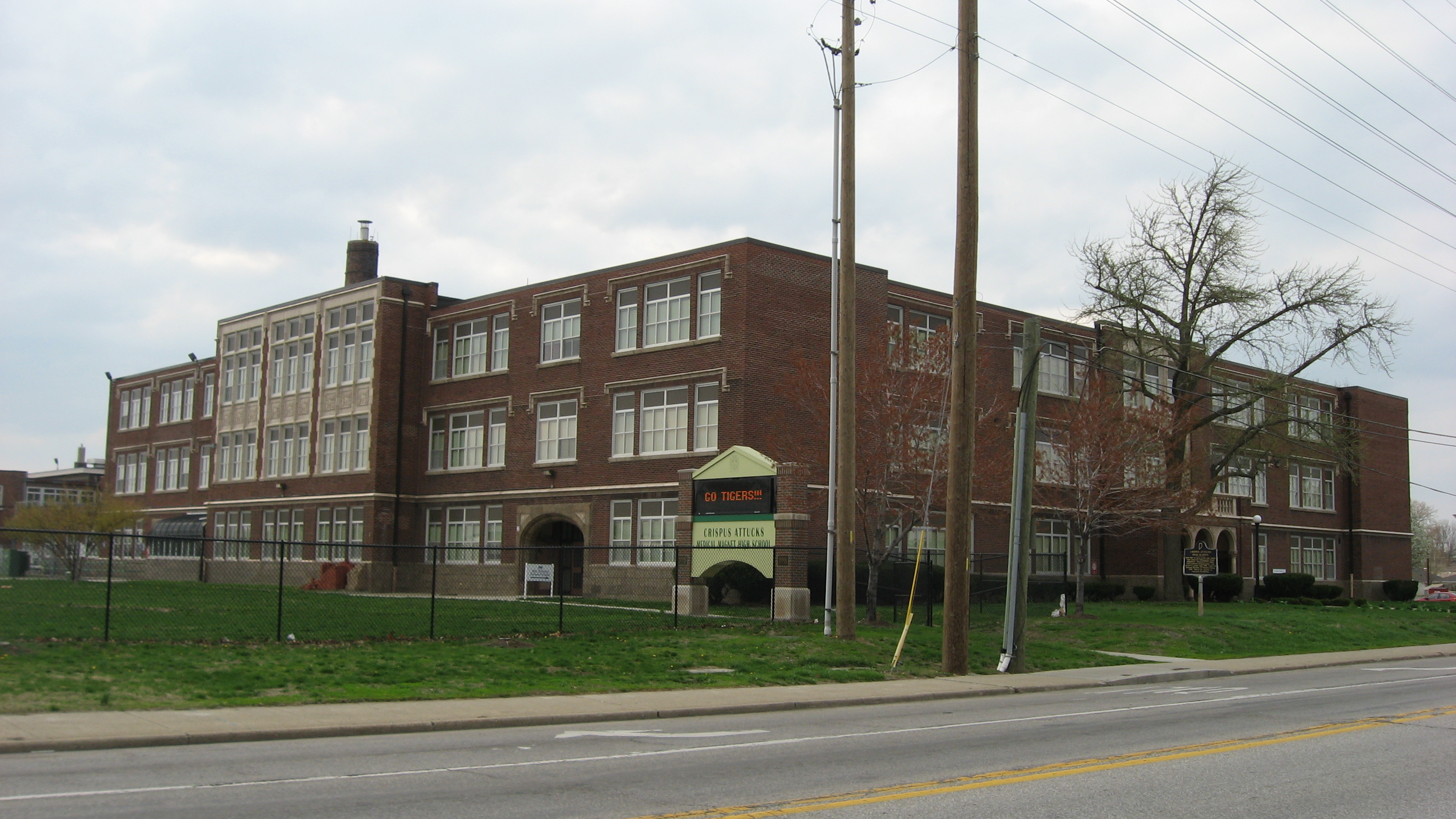
- Front and southern side of the school

Location
- 1140 Dr. Martin Luther King Jr. St. Indianapolis, Marion County, Indiana 46202; United States; 39°46′58.39″N 86°10′11.78″W

Information
- Type: Public high school
- Established: 1927
- School district: Indianapolis Public Schools
- Principal: Lauren Franklin
- Faculty: 65.00
- Grades: 9–12
- Enrollment: 1,179 (2023–2024)
- Color
- Athletics conference: Independent
- Team name: Tigers
- Website: Official website
- Crispus Attucks High School
- U.S. National Register of Historic Places
- Built: 1927
- Architect: Harrison & Turnock; Brown & Mick
- Architectural style: Collegiate Gothic/Tudor Revival
- NRHP reference No.: 88003043
- Added to NRHP: January 4, 1989

Crispus Attucks High School (also known as Crispus Attucks Medical Magnet High School) is a public high school of Indianapolis Public Schools in Indianapolis, Indiana, U.S. Its namesake, Crispus Attucks (c.1723 – March 5, 1770), was an African American patriot killed during the Boston Massacre. The school was built northwest of downtown Indianapolis near Indiana Avenue (the business and cultural hub of the city's African American community) and opened on September 12, 1927, when it was the only public high school in the city designated specifically for African Americans.

Despite the passage of federal and state school desegregation laws, Attucks was the city's only high school with a single-race student body in 1953, largely due to residential segregation, and remained a segregated school until 1971 (although some historians suggest that its desegregation occurred in 1968). Due to declining enrollment, Attucks was converted to a junior high school in 1986, and a middle school in 1993. It became a medical magnet high school in 2006, partially due to the school's proximity to the campus of the Indiana University School of Medicine and its associated hospitals.

The red brick building with terra-cotta and limestone detailing covers a two-square-block area and was built in three phases. A three-story main building, designed by local architects Merritt Harrison and Llewellyn A. Turnock, was constructed in 1927. A three-story addition and a two-story gymnasium were built in 1938. A newer, two-story gymnasium was constructed in 1966. The main building and the 1938 addition reflect Collegiate Gothic (or Tudor Revival) and Classical Revival styles of architecture. The high school was added to the National Register of Historic Places in 1989.

During its early years, Attucks was known for its excellence in academics, in addition to its successful athletic teams, especially its basketball program. The high school also became a gathering place and a source of pride for the city's African American community. In 1955, the Attucks Tigers won the Indiana High School Athletic Association's state basketball championship, becoming the first all-black school in the nation to win a state title. In 1956, the team became the first state champions in IHSAA history to complete a season undefeated since the Indiana High School Boys Basketball Tournament began in 1911. Attucks also won the IHSAA state basketball championship in 1959 and in 2017 (Class 3A). The school contains the Crispus Attucks Museum, which opened in 1998.

== History ==
=== Early 1920s ===
Indianapolis was a largely segregated city in the early twentieth century, although three of its public high schools enrolled black students: Emmerich Manual High School, Arsenal Technical High School, and Shortridge High School. Overcrowding, especially at Shortridge, led Indianapolis Public Schools' board members to begin discussions on the construction of a new high school. In 1922, as interest in building an all-black public high school increased, the IPS board decided to pursue the idea and began to move ahead with its plans.

Some white residents of the city, not wanting their children to attend an integrated high school, urged the school board to build a new public high school specifically for African American students. However, some African Americans in the community adamantly opposed the establishment of an all-black high school and preferred an integrated public school system. Despite the differing viewpoints, the IPS board decided that all of the city's African American high school students would attend the new school.

=== Early years ===
Crispus Attucks High School was built northwest of downtown Indianapolis, in the area that was known as the Bottoms, near the Indiana Central Canal and Indiana Avenue, which was the African American community's business and cultural hub. The Bottoms was also the largest and best-known area of the city's African American community.

The IPS board initially chose Thomas Jefferson High School as the name for the new school, but some members of the community objected to the choice and circulated petitions to have the name changed to Crispus Attucks High School. The school board reversed its decision and named the school in honor of Crispus Attucks. His ethnicity is now uncertain, but at the time the new school was named, it was believed he was a black man who was killed in the attack on British soldiers in Boston, Massachusetts, in March 1770 during what became known as the Boston Massacre.

All the African American teenagers enrolled at the city's other public high schools, such as Arsenal Technical High School, George Washington Community High School, and Shortridge High School, were moved to Crispus Attucks when it opened in 1927 with the promise that the Attucks students would receive a "separate but equal" education. After Attucks opened, IPS administrators prohibited African American students from attending any other public high school in the city until integration of the schools was mandated by law. Community activists who opposed the decision challenged the local school board through the legal justice system, but efforts to desegregate the city's schools continued for several decades after the school opened.

==== Students and faculty ====
In addition to its students, Attucks's first principal, Matthias Nolcox, and its initial faculty were African Americans, making it the only all-black high school in Indianapolis. Nolcox recruited well-educated teachers for the new school from the traditionally black colleges in the South, as well as from high schools in other areas of the country. While black students were allowed to attend colleges and universities, the schools of higher learning did not hire black educators for their faculties leaving a large group of overqualified teachers forced to teach at the high school level.

Indianapolis's new high school was originally planned for 1,000 students; however, the estimate soon increased to 1,200 students, requiring Nolcox to hire additional staff to accommodate the projected increase in enrollment. The school opened on September 12, 1927, with 42 faculty and 1,345 students. Formal dedication ceremonies took place on October 28, 1927. After Attucks, Indiana had two other all-black public high schools opened in the state: Gary's Roosevelt High School and Evansville's Lincoln High School.

From the beginning, overcrowding was a persistent problem at Attucks. The IPS board authorized the remodeling of IPS Number 17, a school building adjacent to Attucks, to house the overflow of students. Nolcox served as principal of both facilities. Thomas J. Anderson replaced Nolcox as the school's second principal from July to September 1930. An interim principal briefly assumed Anderson's duties until Russell A. Lane, who was hired as one of the school's original English teachers, was named the new principal later that fall.

Lane continued to hire well-educated faculty for the school. At a time when most other high schools in the city had teachers with undergraduate bachelor's degrees, several of Attucks's teachers had master's degrees or PhDs. During these early years, Attucks's percentage of teachers with advanced degrees was higher than any other school in the area. By 1934, Attucks had 62 faculty members; 17 of them had master's degrees and two had doctorate degrees. In 1935–36, the school had grown to include 68 faculty and 2,327 students. A freshman center was added to the high school in 1938 to alleviate overcrowding.

==== Curriculum and events ====
Attucks offered an extensive curriculum, including general education courses such as math, sciences, language arts, art, music, and physical education, as well as home economics and industrial arts courses to provide vocational training. Because of its faculty and varied curriculum, Attucks became known for its excellence in academics, in addition to its successful athletic programs.

The Indianapolis Recorder, the local newspaper for the African American community, publicized school events, which helped to bring Attucks's various activities to the public's attention. The school became a gathering place and a source of pride for the city's African American community. The school's athletic teams, especially its basketball program, "represented the African American community in Indianapolis."

To encourage the students and show support for the school, several celebrities made visits to the school and addressed gatherings of the student body. Notable visitors included Jesse Owens, Langston Hughes, Thurgood Marshall, George Washington Carver, and Floyd Patterson, as well as other notable athletes, authors, scientists, politicians, and civil rights activists who came to the city to speak the previous Sunday at the nearby Senate Avenue Young Men's Christian Association's speakers' series, called "Monster Meetings".

=== 1940s and 1950s ===
Desegregation of the city's schools became a major issue in the late-1940s and during the civil rights movement of the 1950s and 1960s. Despite the state legislature's passage of mandatory desegregation laws in 1949, the IPS board approved a gradual desegregation plan and Attucks remained an all-black high school, largely due to residential segregation. During this period, the high school's enrollment began to decline from 2,364 students in 1949 to 1,612 in 1953. Attucks had two white educators on its faculty in 1956 and continued to remain the only "high school in the city with a single-race student body."

==== 1950s basketball team state championships ====
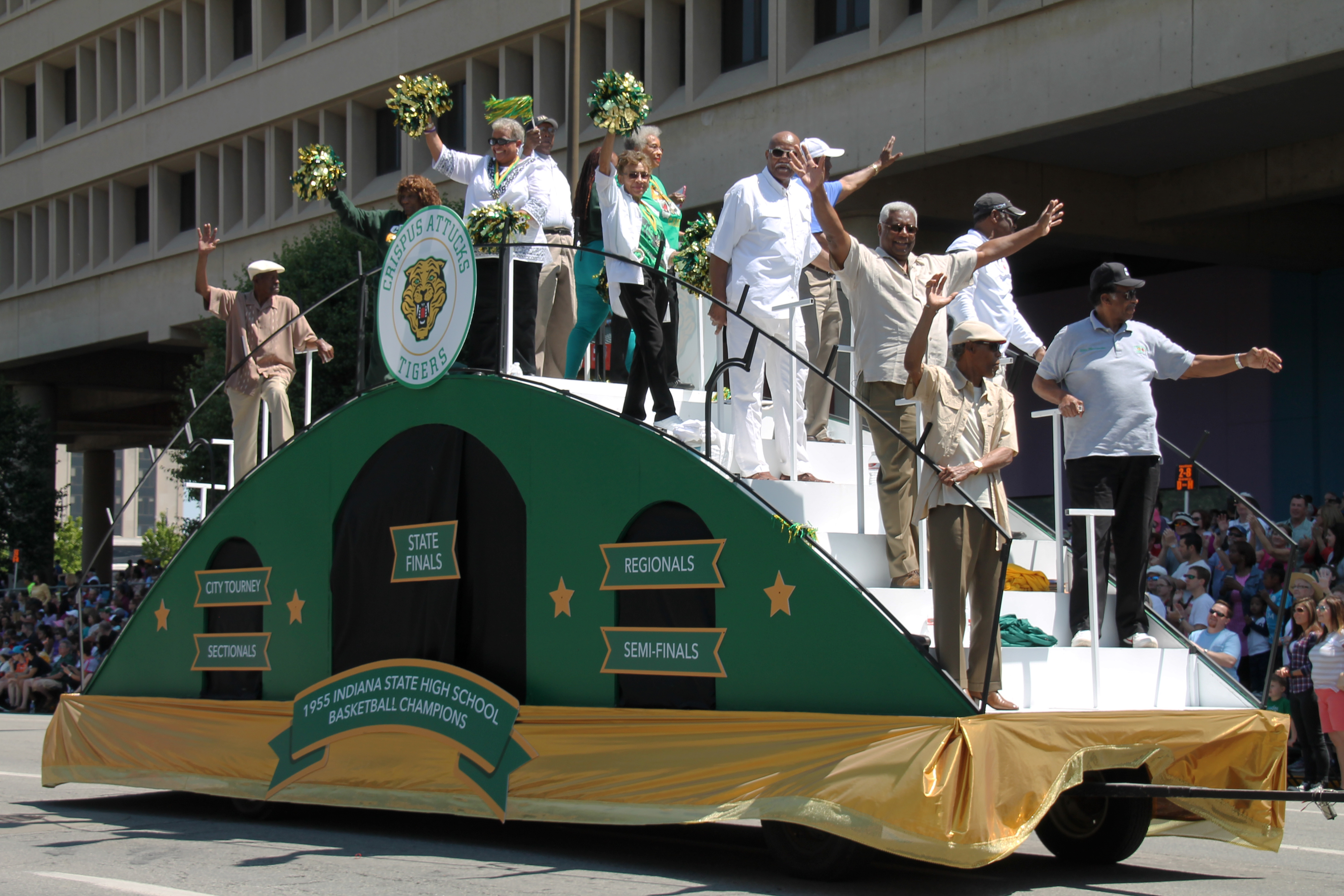
Members of the Crispus Attucks 1955 State Champion basketball team were grand marshals of the 500 Festival Parade in 2015.

The Indiana High School Athletic Association (IHSAA) refused full membership to private, parochial, and all-black high schools until 1942 when full membership opened to include all of the state's three- and four-year high schools. The change in membership allowed Attucks and the state's other all-black high schools, as well as Indiana's Catholic high schools, to participate for the first time in IHSAA-sanctioned basketball tournaments. Attucks had good success in basketball during the 1950s, producing two Indiana Mr. Basketballs: Hallie Bryant and Oscar Robertson. In addition to Bryant and Robertson, several other Attucks players and coaches have been inducted into the Indiana Basketball Hall of Fame.

The Attucks Tigers made it to the Indiana High School Boys Basketball Tournament semi-state championship game for the first time in 1951 but lost to Evansville's Reitz Memorial High School, 66–59. On March 19, 1955, the Attucks team, led by future professional star and National Basketball Association Hall of Famer Oscar Robertson, won the IHSAA's state championship, beating Gary's Roosevelt High School, 97–64, and becoming the first all-black school in the nation to win a state title. Robertson led Attucks to another championship in 1956, beating Lafayette's Jefferson High School, 79–57, and becoming the first state champion team in IHSAA history to complete a season undefeated since the state tournament began in 1911. The program won its third IHSAA state basketball championship in 1959. Because the school's black student-athletes played and won contests with predominately white teams, historians have pointed out that Attucks's successful basketball program also "mobilized the black community" and served as "role models for black youths".

=== 1960s–1990s ===
By the 1960s Indianapolis's racial and class segregation led to changes at Attucks. As the city's black middle class moved to other neighborhoods, some of their children were enrolled at Shortridge and Arsenal Tech high schools, while the children of poorer African Americans continued to attend Attucks. In addition, the IPS board continued to ignore the federal government's suggestions for integration of its schools. In 1970, U.S. District Court Judge Samuel Hugh Dillin "found IPS guilty of operating a segregated school system." Although IPS opened an integrated secondary campus on Cold Springs Road in 1970 to help ease some of the overcrowding at Attucks, the main high school building remained a segregated school while appeals of the federal court's decision continued. As a result of the lengthy appeals process, sources indicate that it is difficult to specify an exact date for Attucks's formal desegregation. School historians believe that the first white students enrolled at Attucks's main campus in 1971, although others have suggested that it occurred in 1968.

In 1981, IPS administrators considered closing the high school due to rapidly declining enrollment. Attucks's student body was 973 in 1980, but enrollment had fallen to 885 in 1985. Although many opposed the idea, Attucks was converted from a high school to a junior high school in 1986 and became a middle school in 1993. The building was placed in the National Register of Historic Places in 1989 and the Indiana Historical Bureau erected a state historical marker at the school in 1992.

=== 2000s–present ===
Attucks reverted to a high school in 2006, when IPS superintendent Eugene White announced the formation of the Crispus Attucks Medical Magnet, changing the school from a middle school to a medical preparatory school for grades 6–12. The designation as a medical magnet school is partially due to the school's proximity to the campus of the Indiana University School of Medicine and its associated hospitals. The change was made by adding one grade each year. The magnet school's first class graduated in 2010; its first class to complete the full medical magnet program graduated in 2013. Attucks restored its basketball program in 2008 as an IHSAA Class 3A school. The team won the Class 3A title on March 25, 2017, its first state basketball championship since 1959.

== Building description ==
=== Exterior ===
The school covers a two-square-block area and was built in three phases: a three-story, flat-roofed main building with an E-shaped plan on the east, constructed in 1927; a three-story addition to the west of the main building and a two-story gymnasium, built in 1938; and a newer, two-story gymnasium constructed in 1966. The main building, designed by local architects Merritt Harrison and Llewellyn A. Turnock, as well as the 1938 addition, reflect Collegiate Gothic (or Tudor Revival) and Classical Revival styles of architecture. The main building is constructed primarily of red brick and includes buff-colored glazed architectural terra-cotta detailing. The red brick addition built in 1938 has similar architectural detailing but uses limestone instead of terra-cotta. The newer red brick gymnasium built in 1966 has concrete vertical and horizontal bands.

The main façade, facing east, dates to 1927 and has a center section and nearly identical projecting sections at each end. The center section's one-story entrance foyer has three pairs of entry doors with fanlights and a terra-cotta belt course separating a terra-cotta balustrade, above, from a round-arched, terra-cotta arcade, below. Each of the center section's two upper stories contains panels with terra-cotta detailing around a grouping of three windows. Terra-cotta panels on the second include a lyre, laurel leaves, and violins in bas-relief. Terra-cotta panels above the third-floor windows contain the words Attucks High School inscribed in Old English typeface. Windows along the main façade are grouped in threes (a pair of smaller windows on either side of a double window). A belt course runs across the entire main façade above the first-floor lintels and windows. Upper-story windows have terra-cotta molding above the lintels and windows.

The north façade shows the original, three-story section on the east with two wings flanking a center section. There are entrances in each wing and nine windows on each floor of the center section. The two upper stories of the original building have windows set in three terra-cotta panels. Oil lamps and other decorations in bas-relief decorate the panels separating the first and second floors. Each story of the 1938 red-brick and limestone addition has four groupings of windows, each one with four windows, and limestone details. The three-story addition rests on a limestone foundation. The two-story gymnasium, built to the west of the 1938 addition, has an entry framed with a limestone arch. The word Gymnasium is inscribed in Old English typeface on a stone tablet above the arch. A newer gymnasium, constructed of brick with concrete bands, was added to the west of the older gymnasium in 1966. The main entrance to the new gymnasium is on the north side. A side entry is on the building's south elevation. The south façade contains the main building constructed in 1927 (similar in appearance to the north façade) and a one-story greenhouse, also original to the building. Interconnected additions on the south façade include the 1938 addition, service areas, and loading docks constructed at various times. There is also a five-story, red brick smokestack.

=== Interior ===
The original 1927 school building has classrooms with double-loaded corridors arranged in a square around the auditorium. Notable features of the original interior include the main entry foyer with its terrazzo floors and a triple-arched arcade with terra-cotta columns. The plastered ceilings of the foyer and auditorium have exposed beams. The Crispus Attucks museum was also established in another section of the building.

== Museum ==
After several years of development, the Crispus Attucks Museum opened in the school's former auxiliary gym in 1998. The museum houses four galleries and 38 exhibits recalling local, state, national, and international African American history. Indiana Black Expo, Indiana University, and the Madam Walker Legacy Center are frequent collaborators. The museum underwent a renovation in 2009.

It is open to guests by appointment only, Monday through Friday (9 a.m. to 6 p.m.) and Saturday through Sunday (10 a.m. to 3 p.m.).

== Notable administrators and faculty ==
=== Principals ===
- Matthias Nolcox, first high school principal (1927–1930)
- Thomas J. Anderson, second high school principal (1930)
- Russell A. Lane, third high school principal (1930–1957); became Indianapolis Public Schools administrator in 1957
- Dr. Alexander M. Moor, fourth high school principal (1957–1968); became Indianapolis Public Schools assistant superintendent in 1968
- Earl Donalson, fifth high school principal (1969–1983)
- Dr. Charles David Robinson, sixth high school principal (1983–1986)

=== Notable faculty ===
- Ray Crowe, Attucks's boys' basketball coach (1950–1957); coached the Attucks team to back-to-back IHSAA high school basketball championship titles in 1955 and 1956; Attucks's athletic director (1957–1967); member of Indiana House of Representatives (1967–1975); director of Indianapolis Parks Department (1976–1979); member of Indianapolis City-County Council (1983–1987)
- Bill Garrett, Attucks's boys' basketball coach (1957–1968); coached the team to an IHSAA high school basketball championship title in 1959; athletic director (1969–1971); director of continuing education, Ivy Tech Community College of Indiana (1971–1973); assistant dean for student services, Indiana University–Purdue University Indianapolis (1973–1974)
- John Morton-Finney, an original faculty member; head of foreign languages department, 1920s–1950s
- Merze Tate, an original faculty member; later became a faculty member at Howard University and a Fulbright scholar
- Letty M. Wickliffe, head of special and gifted education programs, 1930s–1960s

== See also ==
- List of high schools in Indiana
- List of schools in Indianapolis
- National Register of Historic Places listings in Center Township, Marion County, Indiana
- Crispus Attucks Club
