= Bill Garrett (basketball) =

Basketball player, coach and educator

Personal information
- Born: April 4, 1929 Shelbyville, Indiana, U.S.
- Died: August 7, 1974 (aged 45) Indianapolis, Indiana, U.S. buried at Crown Hill Cemetery and Arboretum, Section 224, Lot 745
- Listed height: 6 ft 3 in (1.91 m)

Career information
- High school: Shelbyville (Shelbyville, Indiana)
- College: Indiana (1948–1951)
- NBA draft: 1951: 2nd round, 16th overall pick
- Drafted by: Boston Celtics
- Position: Center

Career history

Playing
- 1953–1956: Harlem Globetrotters

Coaching
- 1956–1957: Wood HS
- 1957–1968: Crispus Attucks HS

Career highlights
- As player: Consensus second-team All-American (1951); IHSAA champion (1947); Indiana Mr. Basketball (1947); As coach: IHSAA champion (1957)
- Stats at Basketball Reference

William Leon Garrett (April 4, 1929 – August 7, 1974) was a basketball player, coach, educator, and a college administrator who is best known as the first African American to regularly play on a Big Ten Conference varsity basketball team. Prior to becoming a college player for Indiana University (1947–51), the Shelbyville, Indiana, native led his Shelbyville High School basketball team to its first state high school basketball championship in 1947 and he was named Indiana Mr. Basketball. In 1959 Garrett coached Indianapolis's Crispus Attucks High School boys' basketball team to the state high school basketball championship title, making him the only Indiana Mr. Basketball to win a state championship as a player and as a coach.

The Boston Celtics chose Garrett in the second round of the 1951 National Basketball Association draft, but he was drafted into the U.S. Army and released from the Celtics without playing in an NBA regular season or playoff game. After completing his military service in 1953, Garrett played exhibition games for the Harlem Globetrotters for less than two years before becoming a basketball coach and educator in Indianapolis. In his later years Garrett served as a coach and athletic director at Crispus Attucks High School, an instructor at Ivy Tech Community College of Indiana, and as assistant dean for student services at Indiana University-Purdue University Indianapolis. Garrett was inducted into Indiana Basketball Hall of Fame in 1974.

== Early life ==
Garrett was born on April 4, 1929, in Shelbyville, Indiana. the oldest of Laura Belle (O'Bannon) and William Leon Garrett Sr.'s three children. Bill Garrett's younger siblings included two sisters, Mildred, Laura, and a brother, James.

Garrett attended Booker T. Washington Elementary School, a racially-segregated school in Shelbyville, and graduated from Shelbyville High School in 1947. He was one of only a few African American students in his high school graduating class.

Garrett was one of three black starters who played on his high school's integrated basketball team. In 1947 he led the Shelbyville Golden Bears to its first state high school basketball championship, beating Terre Haute's Garfield High School, 68–58. Garrett also set a new tournament scoring record of 91 points, beating the 85-point record that Anderson High School's Jumping Johnny Wilson had set the previous year.

Garrett was named Indiana Mr. Basketball for 1947, the same year that Jackie Robinson broke the color barrier in Major League Baseball. Garrett also led Indiana's high school All-star team to victory over its Kentucky counterparts. At a time when college basketball in the United States was segregated with only a few exceptions, no major college coach recruited Garrett to play basketball. Garrett had planned to attend Tennessee State, a historically black university in Nashville, Tennessee, until others interceded on his behalf to have him enroll and play basketball at Indiana University in Bloomington, Indiana.

== Marriage and family ==
Bill Garrett met Betty Guess, a native of Madison, Indiana, and a fellow physical education major at IU, during his sophomore year of college. They were married on August 2, 1952, in Madison, while Garrett was still serving in the military at Fort Leonard Wood, Missouri.

Bill and Betty Garrett were the parents of four children, which included three daughters, Tina, Judith, and Laurie, and a son, William "Billy." The Garretts' daughters "became the first African Americans to compete in open swimming competitions in Indianapolis and became nationally ranked swimmers." Billy Garrett Jr. is his grandson.

Betty (Guess) Garrett became an educator and administrator, and died in January 2016. Her second husband was Herbert Inskeep.

== Career ==
Between 1947, when he began college, until his death in 1974, Garrett played and coached basketball, and served as an educator and school administrator.

=== College basketball ===
Garrett began playing for head coach Branch McCracken at Indiana University in Bloomington, Indiana, in 1947.

Garrett was the first African American to play on the IU basketball team and also the first to regularly start on a Big Ten Conference team. In 1944 Richard "Dick" Culbertson became the first African American to play in the Big Ten; however, he was a substitute player instead of a regular player on the University of Iowa team. Also, the conference was called the Big Nine between 1946, when the University of Chicago withdrew from the league, until 1950, when Michigan State joined it.

Even though the states in which the Big Ten Conference teams were located had talented African American high school basketball players, Big Ten coaches did not recruit them. In addition, the Big Ten teams remained segregated into the late 1940s because all of the Big Ten coaches adhered to an unwritten "gentlemen's agreement" that barred black players from their teams. Basketball was not the only activity that remained segregated in the late 1940s. Hospitals, schools, restaurants, theaters, neighborhoods, pools, and recreation centers, among others, were segregated "by law or by custom" as well. IU also barred black students from living in most residence halls, eating in campus dining rooms, participating in university social events, and joining honorary societies and white fraternity and sororities. However, by the late 1940s African Americans began "pressing for more substantial change."

In August 1947 civil rights activist Faburn DeFrantz, executive director of Indianapolis's Senate Avenue Young Men's Christian Association, and a few others, met with IU president Herman B Wells, who had made integration of the IU Bloomington campus among his top priorities. DeFrantz and his associates lobbied Wells on Garrett's behalf to give him a chance to play basketball at IU. Wells conferred with McCracken, who made the decision to let Garrett try out for the team and agreed to let Garrett play if he qualified.

Garrett was admitted to IU in the fall of 1947, the same year that Jackie Robinson integrated professional baseball, and began practice on November 1, 1947, as a member of IU's freshman team (first-year IU students were not allowed to play on the varsity squad at that time). Garrett, who played the center position, made his debut on the varsity team in December 1948 when IU beat DePauw University 61–48, and he became the first African American player on IU's varsity basketball team. During his first season on the varsity team Garrett scored 220 points, the highest total for an individual on the team that season. Garrett played his final collegiate basketball game on March 5, 1951. During his final year at IU the team's overall record was 19–3 and ranked seventh in the country.

During his career at IU, Garrett broke the school's four-year career scoring record with a total of 792 points. Garrett also broke the record during the 1950–51 season for scoring the highest number of points in Big Ten Conference games with a total of 193. In June 1951, a month after the Boston Celtics selected Garrett as a player in the second round of the National Basketball Association draft, he graduated from IU with a Bachelor of Science degree in physical education.

Garrett was the sole African American basketball player in the Big Ten Conference during all four years he played for IU. Pressure to perform well on the court was "intense." He also "endured taunts form opponents and their fans" and had to overcome "early hostility from some of his own teammates," as well as several incidents of racial discrimination at home and when the team was on the road. Despite the many challenges and obstacles, Garrett emerged as favorite among the IU fans in addition to setting new scoring and rebounding records for the school. In his senior season (1950–51) Garrett's IU teammates voted him most valuable player. Big Ten coaches and numerous sportswriters also acknowledged his talent, voting him to the All Big Ten first team. Garrett was named a consensus All-American in 1951, and coaches elected him as a write-in for the college all-star team after his name was left off the ballot.

=== Professional basketball and military service ===
On May 5, 1951, the Boston Celtics chose Garrett in the second round of the NBA draft, making him the third black player ever selected for the NBA. However, Garrett's professional basketball career was quickly curtailed after he was drafted into the U.S. Army during the Korean War and instructed to report for induction by September 7, 1951.

Garrett was honorably discharged on August 8, 1953, after two year of military service, mostly in Japan, and returned home to the United States. Garrett intended to play professional basketball, but he learned that the Celtics had released him from the team. "At that time NBA teams had quotas for African American players, and the Celtics already had two on their roster." The team's leadership may also have been concerned that Garrett's height (six foot, three inches) was not tall enough to play center and uncertain about his ability to switch to playing a guard or forward position.

After Garrett's release from the Celtics, the Harlem Globetrotters founder and owner, Abe Saperstein, who had scouted Garrett since his playing days at IU, offered him a contract to play for the team. Garrett considered the team's comic acts and jokes more show-business entertainment rather than a competitive basketball game. He stayed with the Globetrotters for less than two years before leaving the organization in 1955. At the conclusion his playing career, Garrett took a job as a factory worker in Toledo, Ohio, where his wife found work as a teacher, until he took a job as a high school basketball coach and teacher in Indiana.

=== High school basketball coach ===
Following his nearly two-year stint with the Globetrotters, and several months of factory work in Ohio, Garrett began teaching and coaching basketball at Wood High School in Indianapolis, Indiana, in September 1956, but his stay was only a brief one. In 1957 Garrett was hired to replace Ray Crowe as head coach of Indianapolis's Crispus Attucks High boys' basketball team. Crowe had coached the all-black high school team to back-to-back state championships in 1955 and 1956, led by Oscar Robertson. Two years later, Garrett coached the Crispus Attucks Tigers to another state high school basketball championship title in 1959, beating Kokomo High School in the title game, 92–54. The victory made Garrett the only Indiana Mr. Basketball to win a state championship as a player and as a coach. The Indiana Sportswriters and Broadcasters Association also named Garrett the Coach of the Year.

Garrett remained coach of the Crispus Attucks boys' basketball team for ten years, stepping down from the post in 1968, the same year he earned a master's degree in education and a guidance certificate from Butler University. Garrett was named the school's athletic director in 1969, and remained at Attucks for two more years.

== Later years ==
In 1971 Garrett became director of continuing education at Ivy Tech Community College of Indiana, but left the position two years later to begin work as assistant dean for student services at Indiana University-Purdue University Indianapolis in 1973, a year before his untimely death.

== Death and legacy ==
In August 1974 Garrett suffered a sudden heart attack and died four days later on August 7, 1974, at the age of forty-five. He is buried in Crown Hill Cemetery in Indianapolis.

As a college basketball player for IU, Garrett was the first African American to regularly play on a Big Ten Conference team. In addition, Garrett's play as a starter on the IU varsity team is credited for breaking the unwritten agreement among Big Ten coaches that barred African Americans from playing on its conference teams. Garrett's actions on and off the court set an example and paved the way for other black players in the Big Ten to follow.

During Garrett's years at IU (1947–1951), he was the only African American playing on a Big Ten varsity basketball team (1948–51). The University of Michigan's John Codwell and Michigan State's Rickey Ayala were freshmen players during Garrett's senior year (1950–51). In the season following Garrett's graduation from IU in 1951 "at least seven black ballplayers made Big Ten teams," including Ernie Hall at Purdue University and Bob Jewell at Michigan. By 1952 others had joined the rosters of Big Ten varsity teams: Rickey Ayala at Michigan State, Walt Moore at the University of Illinois, and Deacon Davis at Iowa, following the path that Garrett had forged earlier at IU.

== Honors and tributes ==
- In 1951 the Sporting News named Garrett to its All-America team, and the United Press named him to its All-America second team. In addition, Garrett's IU teammates voted him Most Valuable Player of the season.
- In 1974 Garrett was inducted into the Indiana Basketball Hall of Fame, the same year Shelbyville High School's gymnasium was renamed the William L. Garrett Memorial Gymnasium.
- In 2000 Shelbyville High School's new gymnasium was named in Garrett's honor.
- In April 2017 the Indiana Historical Bureau dedicated a state historical marker on the IU campus in Bloomington, Indiana, to commemorate Garrett and the integration of Big Ten basketball. The marker is installed outside the Wildermuth Intramural Center, which is the fieldhouse where Garrett once played.
- In November 2017, during the basketball season's opening ceremonies at Shelbyville High School, the school retired Garrett's number 9 jersey.
- In June 2020, the Indiana University Board of Trustees approved formally renaming the Intramural Center at its Bloomington campus to the Willam Leon Garrett Fieldhouse.
