= Phillis Wheatley Waters =

American educator and basketball player (1895–1973)

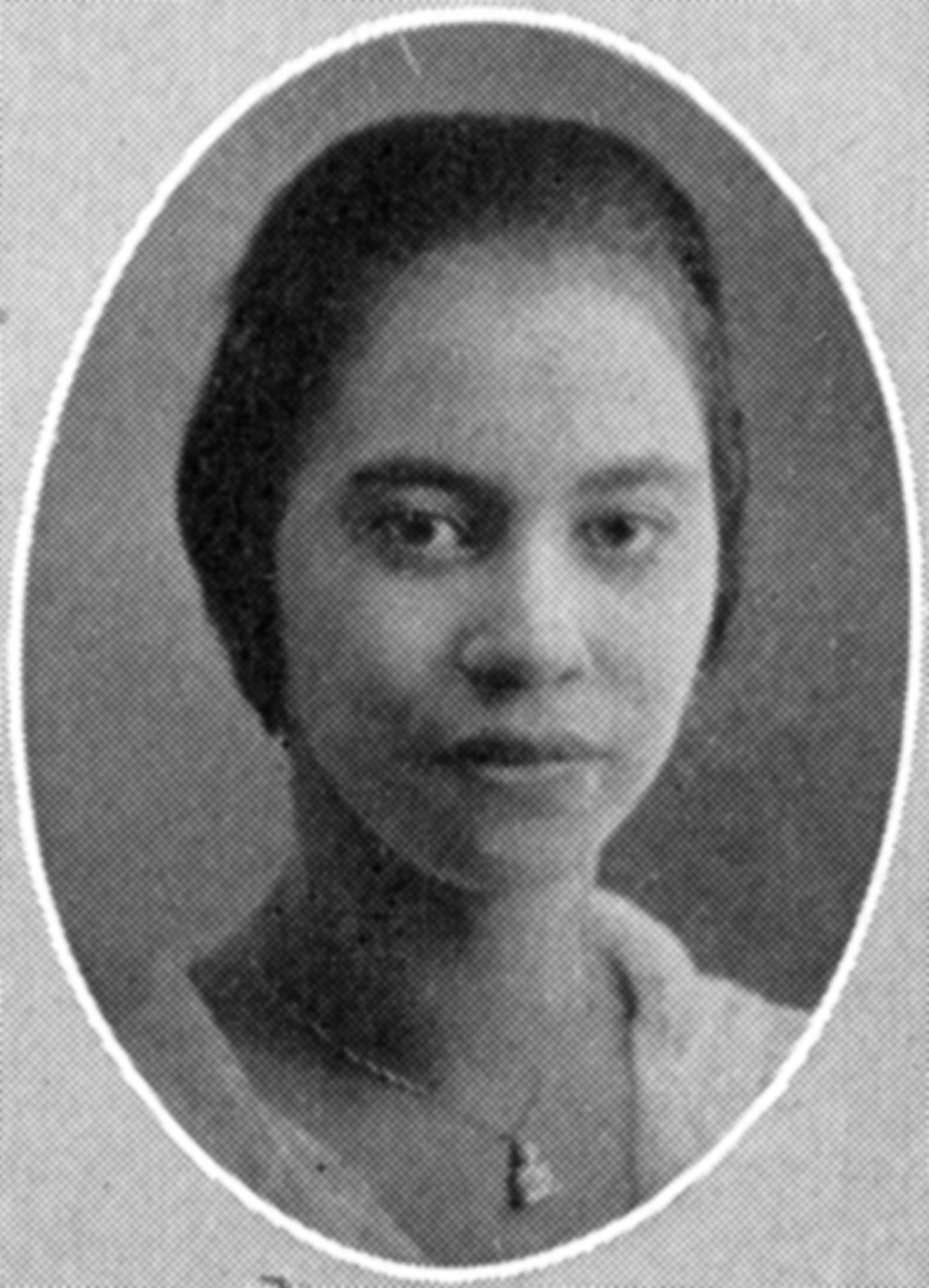
- Born: April 15, 1898
- Died: December 30, 1973

Phillis Wheatley Waters
- Resting place: Crown Hill Cemetery and Aborteum Sec 41A, Sec Anatomical; 39.8213946°N 86.1641283°W

Phillis Wheatley Waters (April 15, 1895 – December 30, 1973) was an American educator and college basketball player. She is thought to be the first African-American college basketball player at the University of Michigan.

A native of Charleston, West Virginia, Phillis Wheatley Waters was born on April 15, 1895. She was the daughter of Phil Waters (1871–1917), a leading figure in African-American society in West Virginia. A lawyer who graduated from Howard University and the University of Michigan School of Law, where he earned a varsity letter in baseball, he served as chief deputy clerk of the West Virginia Supreme Court of Appeals.

Waters graduated from Ann Arbor High School in 1913. There she played basketball and tennis, and was the first African-American to captain the basketball team.

At the University of Michigan, Waters was the first African-American on the school's basketball team and the first African-American woman to earn a varsity letter at the school. As a freshman in 1914, she led the freshman team in an intraschool tournament to victory over the junior team, 14–7. Waters graduated from the University of Michigan in 1917 with a BA in French.

Waters relocated to Indianapolis, Indiana, where she spent the rest of her life. She worked for the public school system there for five decades, primarily teaching at Crispus Attucks High School. She was also active in local civic life and Republican politics, holding a number of posts and unsuccessfully running for Indiana State Representative from Marion County in 1960.

Phillis Wheatley Waters died on 30 December 1973 at her home in Indianapolis.
