= James Blackmon =

James Blackmon may refer to:

- James Blackmon Sr. (born 1964), American basketball coach and former player
- James Blackmon Jr. (born 1995), American basketball player
