= Letty M. Wickliffe =

Special and gifted education educator from Indianapolis, IN (1902–2001)

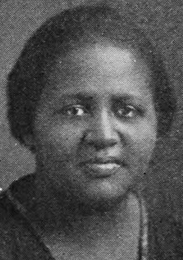
- Letty M. Wickliffe, from a 1924 publication.
- Born: January 25, 1902; Ann Arbor, Michigan
- Died: April 2, 2001 (aged 99); Ann Arbor, Michigan
- Occupation: educator
- Years active: 1920s–1990s
- Known for: special education programs in Indianapolis; community activism in Ann Arbor

Letty M. Wickliffe (January 25, 1902 – April 2, 2001) was an American educator. She directed special education and gifted education services for black students in Indianapolis, Indiana from the 1930s until the mid-1960s. In retirement, she was a community activist in Ann Arbor, Michigan.

== Early life and education ==
Letty M. Wickliffe was born in Ann Arbor, Michigan, the daughter of Joseph Hold Wickliffe and Mary Jewett Wickliffe. Her father had escaped from slavery in Kentucky as a young man, and served in the Union Army during the American Civil War. She attended the Tappan School in Ann Arbor, with mostly white classmates, and sang in the school's chorus at the town's annual May Festival in 1914 and 1915.

She was one of the six African-Americans who graduated from the University of Michigan in 1924. She earned a BS degree in education; she also earned a master's degree in psychology from the University of Michigan, in 1928. She was a founder of the Ann Arbor chapter of the Delta Sigma Theta sorority in 1921, and remained active in sorority events into the 1950s.

== Career ==
Wickliffe taught at Booker T. Washington High School in Dallas from 1924 to 1928. She taught at Crispus Attucks High School in Indianapolis for forty years, until her retirement in 1968. She founded the school's special education and gifted education programs, and published journal articles based on her work. She also gave workshops in special education in South Carolina, Louisiana, and Ohio. "Miss Wickliffe is known nationwide for her knowledge of and service to exceptional children," explained a 1967 news story. I do think it is very essential that all teachers understand the learning problems of slow students," she said in a 1968 interview, "and not only teachers but psychologists need to know how to interpret the scores of inner-city children. Many children classified as retarded appear so as a result of the test, but they are only educationally retarded and not mentally retarded." In 1952 she was chair of the membership drive for the Indianapolis chapter of the NAACP.

In retirement, Wickliffe worked briefly as executive director of the Green Acres School in Richmond, Indiana, then moved back to Ann Arbor, where she ran for the school board in 1972. She was a founding member and president of the North Central Property Owners Association, work she shared with her brother Walter Wickliffe; she was also active in the public library advisory committee, the hospital board, and other civic activities in the city.

Her work was recognized with a Citation for Distinguished Professional Leadership, by the Council for Exceptional Children, and a Presidential Certificate of Appreciation from George H. W. Bush. She was made a fellow of the American Association on Mental Deficiency in 1967. Among her gifted-program students was actor Meshach Taylor, who described her as his most influential teacher in a 1993 television appearance. "She had a concept that there were a lot of kids of color in these neighborhoods that were special and gifted and should be nurtured and treated with care because they had a lot to offer," Taylor recalled in a 2000 profile.

== Personal life ==
In 1992, Letty M. Wickliffe's 90th birthday was marked by the Kiwanis Club in Ann Arbor. She died in 2001, aged 99 years. Her papers are archived in the Bentley Historical Library at the University of Michigan. A condominium complex in Ann Arbor is named Wickliffe Place after Letty M. Wickliffe.
