= James Blackmon Sr. =

American basketball player and coach

Personal information
- Born: August 7, 1964 (age 62) Marion, Indiana, U.S.
- Listed height: 6 ft 3 in (1.91 m)
- Listed weight: 170 lb (77 kg)

Career information
- High school: Marion (Marion, Indiana)
- College: Kentucky (1983–1987)
- NBA draft: 1987: 5th round, 94th overall pick
- Drafted by: New Jersey Nets
- Position: Shooting guard
- Coaching career: 2000–present

Career history

Playing
- 1987–1988: Savannah Spirits
- 1989–1990: Topeka Sizzlers
- 1992: Winnipeg Thunder

Coaching
- 2000–2004: Saint Francis (Indiana) (assistant)
- 2004–2013: Bishop Luers HS
- 2013–present: Marion HS

Career highlights
- McDonald's All-American (1983); First-team Parade All-American (1983)
- Stats at Basketball Reference

James Blackmon Sr. (born August 7, 1964) is an American basketball coach and former noted college and high school player. Blackmon has coached two teams to the class 2A high school basketball championship in Indiana, winning back-to-back titles in 2008 and 2009. He also won the class 3A high school basketball championship in Indiana in 2016. Blackmon played college basketball for the Kentucky Wildcats. As a senior at Marion High School, in Marion, Indiana, Blackmon was runner-up for the award of Indiana Mr. Basketball, won that year by Steve Alford. Blackmon was named to the McDonald's All-American and Parade All-American teams in recognition of his high school success.

== Coaching career ==
=== Bishop Luers High School, Fort Wayne, IN ===
The 2012/13 season was Blackmon's 9th year as head coach at Bishop Luers High School. Blackmon was hired as head coach for the 2004/05 season, taking over a team whose combined record was 7–33 for the prior two seasons. Blackmon has revised the boys' image at a school better known for its championship history in Indiana high school girls basketball. During his tenure, the Knights' play in the state tournament has resulted in 2 state basketball championships and 5 sectional championships. In addition, the Knights have won 3 conference tournament titles and 2 conference regular season championships.

Past players coached by Blackmon include Deshaun Thomas, the 2010 Indiana Mr. Basketball and holder of 3rd place in the list of the state's all-time leading scorers. His teams at MHS have featured his sons, James Blackmon Jr. and Vijay Blackmon.

The 2007/08 Knights won the Summit Athletic Conference holiday tournament for the first time in school history. The win was the first of 3 consecutive tournament titles. The Knights went on to win the Class 2A Indiana high school basketball championship in 2007/08 and again in 2008/09.

The Knights have won 5 sectional titles under Blackmon's leadership, in consecutive seasons starting with 2006/07 and ending in 2009/10 and later in 2012/13.

The 2010/2011 Knights won their first SAC regular season title with a win in their final regular season game.

In May 2011, Blackmon resigned as head coach to accept a similar position at his alma mater, but would later remain at Luers.

The 2011/2012 Knights repeated as SAC regular season champions.

In April 2013, Blackmon resigned as head coach to accept the position offered to him two years earlier at Marion High School.

=== Marion High School, Marion, IN ===
Blackmon announced he was leaving Bishop Luers after he was named head coach on May 11, 2011, by a 5–2 vote by the school board of the Marion Community Schools. With the move, Blackmon would be returning to his alma mater, a school whose rich basketball tradition includes the second-most titles in the history of Indiana high school basketball. Later that same month, in a dramatic change of events, Blackmon sent his letter of resignation to Marion and announced that he would be retaining his position as head coach at Bishop Luers.

In 2013, rumors tied Blackmon to Marion High School again when it was reported that he had been interviewed for the head coach's job. On April 24, 2013, the Marion Community Schools board voted unanimously to offer the position to Blackmon after the recent resignation of the prior head basketball coach. Once again, Blackmon accepted. Blackmon commented that he reneged after the previous hiring due to problems certain board members and others had with that selection process. This time, the board's 7–0 vote was met with warmth and ovations from those in attendance.

== Head coaching record ==
Record table
Season	Team	Overall	Conference	Standing	Postseason
Bishop Luers High School (Summit Athletic Conference) (2004–2012)
2004/05	Bishop Luers	12–9	7–2	2nd	L Sectional first round
2005/06	Bishop Luers	11–9	3–6	T-7th	L Sectional first round
2006/07	Bishop Luers	16–7	5–4	5th	W Sectional championship
2007/08	Bishop Luers	24–3	7–2	T-2nd	W Class 2A state championship
2008/09	Bishop Luers	23–4	8–1	2nd	W Class 2A state championship
2009/10	Bishop Luers	14–10	5–4	T-3rd	W Sectional championship
2010/11	Bishop Luers	17–5	7–1	T-1st	L Sectional championship
2011/12	Bishop Luers	13–9*	6–1	1st	L Sectional championship
2012/13	Bishop Luers	16–7	4–3	4th	W Sectional championship
Bishop Luers:		146–63	52–24		
Marion High School (North Central Conference) (2013–present)
2013/14	Marion	18–5	4–3	2nd	L Sectional semifinals
2014/15	Marion	15–10	5–4	2nd	L Sectional first round
2015/16	Marion	23–7	5–3		W Class 4A state championship
2016/17	Marion	10–13	4–5		L Sectional first round
2017/18	Marion	20–7	6–3		W Sectional championship
2018/19	Marion	19–8	7–2		W Regional championship
2019/20	Marion	12–11	6–3		
Marion:		117–61	37–23		
Total:		263–124			
National champion Postseason invitational champion Conference regular season champion Conference regular season and conference tournament champion Division regular season champion Division regular season and conference tournament champion Conference tournament champion

* – Blackmon served a one-game suspension issued by the IHSAA in the first game of the 2011/12 season, won by the Knights. The Knights finished the season 14–9.

== Playing career ==
=== Professional ===
Blackmon was drafted by the New Jersey Nets in the 5th round, the 94th pick overall in the 1987 NBA draft. However, he never played in an NBA game.

=== College ===
- Senior (1986/87)

Season schedule

- Junior (1985/86)

Season schedule

- Sophomore (1984/85)

Season schedule

- Freshman (1983/84)

Season schedule
Blackmon's value was evident right from the start. He was one of only 5 Wildcats who played in all 34 games that season.

=== High school ===
- Blackmon finished his high school career with 1,897 points, currently listed as 66th best in Indiana boys' high school history.
- Blackmon scored 21 points to share leading-scorer honors for the victorious West team in the 1983 McDonald's Boys All-American Game.
- Blackmon was selected as a member of the 2008 Indiana Basketball Hall of Fame Silver Anniversary team.
- Senior (1982/83)
  - Blackmon scored 914 points during the 1982/83 season, the 10th best single-season total in Indiana boys high school history.
  - Blackmon led the Marion Giants to a regional championship and the state championship semi-finals before losing a high scoring game to Anderson High School. In his last game, Blackmon scored 52 points to set a state finals tournament record that still stands today. The effort, tied for 6th best in Indiana boys high school tournament history, was not enough to overcome the 42 points scored by Anderson's Troy Lewis, the second best individual effort in Indiana's single-class state finals tournament history.
- Junior (1981/82)
- Sophomore (1980/81)
- Freshman (1979/80)
