= Martinsville High School Gymnasium =

High School Gymnasium

- U.S. National Register of Historic Places
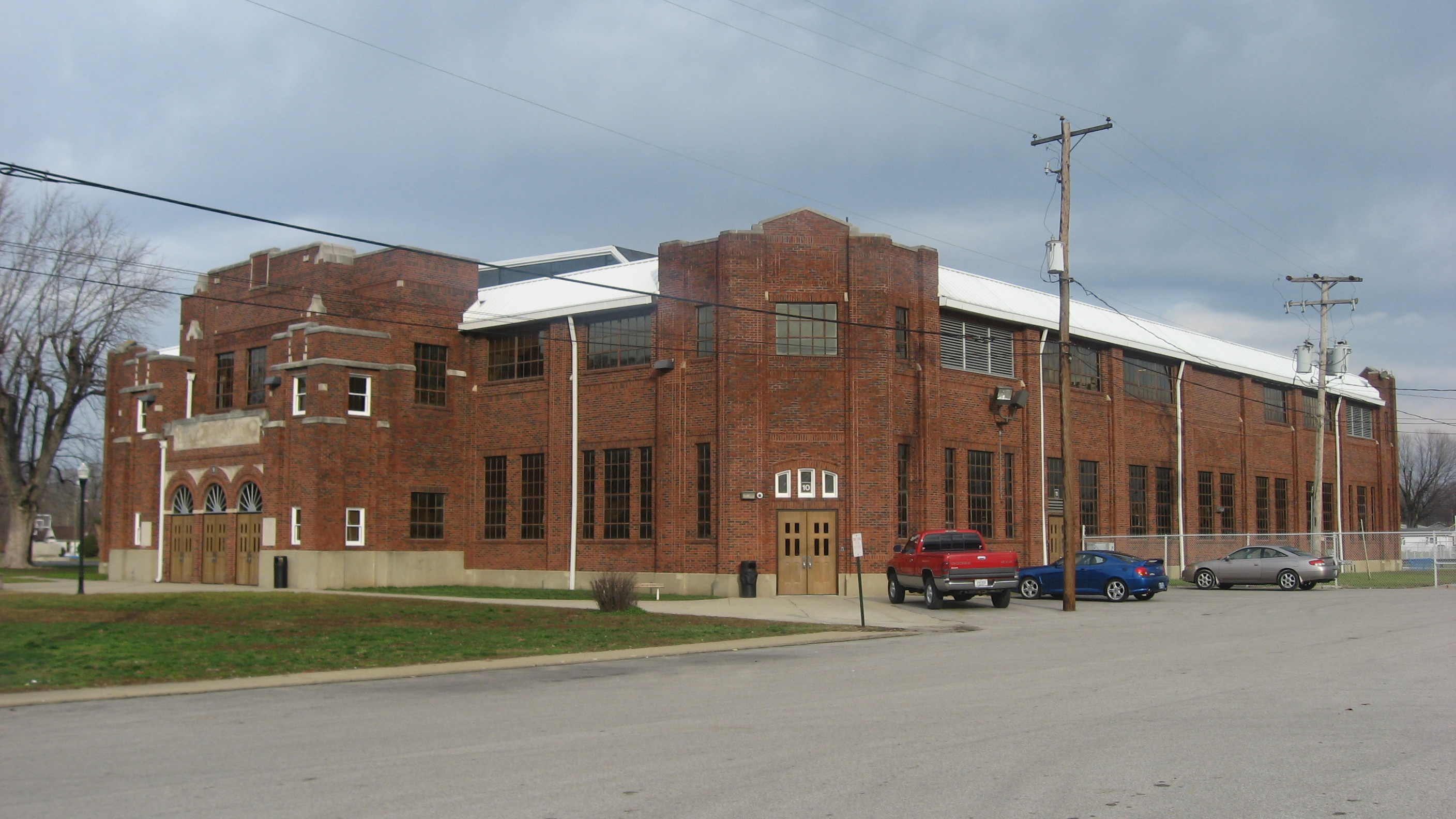
- Martinsville High School Gymnasium, December 2011

- Location within Indiana Location within the United States
- Location: 759 S. Main St., Martinsville, Indiana
- Coordinates: 39°25′9″N 86°25′40″W
- Area: 1.2 acres (0.49 ha)
- Built: 1923-1924
- Architect: Bohlen & Son; Naugel Brothers
- Architectural style: Romanesque, Richardsonian Romanesque
- NRHP reference No.: 81000004
- Added to NRHP: July 30, 1981

Martinsville High School Gymnasium, also known as the Glenn M. Curtis Memorial Gymnasium, is an historic high school gymnasium located at Martinsville, Indiana. It was built in 1923–1924, and is a two-story, rectangular, steel frame building sheathed in brick and limestone with Romanesque Revival style design elements. It measures 180 feet by 210 feet and features angled corners with parapet, a main entrance flanked by square towers, and a mansard roof. It was named for basketball coach Glenn M. Curtis (1890–1958) in 1959.

It was listed on the National Register of Historic Places in 1981.
