= Indiana High School Boys Basketball Tournament =

American basketball championship

The Indiana High School Boys Basketball Tournament, organized by the Indiana High School Athletic Association (IHSAA), is one of the oldest state high school basketball tournaments in America. The tournament has often featured future NCAA and National Basketball Association (NBA) players. The Milan Miracle team in the 1953–54 season inspired the 1986 movie Hoosiers. In the early 1920s, the tournament was dominated by the Franklin Wonder Five, who won three consecutive state championships, followed by a college championship at Franklin College. They won several games against professional teams.

Beginning with the 1997–98 season, the IHSAA divided Indiana high schools into four classes based on enrollment, and each class held its own tournament.

== List of champions ==
Season	Class	Champion	Coach	Record	Runner-up	Score
1910–11		Crawfordsville	David Glascock	16–2	Lebanon	24-17
1911–12		Lebanon	Claude Whitney	16–3	Franklin	51–11
1912–13		Wingate	Jesse Wood	22–3	South Bend	15–14 (5OT)
1913–14		Wingate	Len Lehman	19–5	Anderson	36–8
1914–15		Thorntown	Chester Hill	22–5	Montmorenci	33–10
1915–16		Lafayette	C. F. Apking	20–4	Crawfordsville	27–26 (OT)
1916–17		Lebanon	Alva Staggs	26–2	Gary	34–26
1917–18		Lebanon	Glenn M. Curtis	28–2	Anderson	24–20 (OT)
1918–19		Bloomington	Clifford Wells	23–3	Lafayette	18–15
1919–20		Franklin	Ernest Wagner	29–1	Lafayette	31–13
1920–21		Franklin	Ernest Wagner	29–4	Anderson	35–22
1921–22		Franklin	Ernest Wagner	31–4	Terre Haute Garfield	26–15
1922–23		Vincennes	John Adams	34–1	Muncie	27–18
1923–24		Martinsville	Glenn M. Curtis	22–7	Frankfort	36–30
1924–25		Frankfort	Everett Case	27–2	Kokomo	34–20
1925–26		Marion	Gene Thomas	27–2	Martinsville	30–23
1926–27		Martinsville	Glenn M. Curtis	26–3	Muncie	26–23
1927–28		Muncie	Pete Jolly	28–2	Martinsville	13–12
1928–29		Frankfort	Everett Case	25–2	Indianapolis Technical	29–23
1929–30		Washington	Burl Friddle	31–1	Muncie	32–21
1930–31		Muncie	Pete Jolly	25–6	Greencastle	31–23
1931–32		New Castle	Orville Hooker	28–3	Winamac	24–17
1932–33		Martinsville	Glenn M. Curtis	21–8	Greencastle	27–24
1933–34		Logansport	Clifford Wells	28–4	Indianapolis Technical	26–19
1934–35		Anderson	Archie Chadd	22–9	Jeffersonville	23–17
1935–36		Frankfort	Everett Case	29–1–1	Fort Wayne Central	50–24
1936–37		Anderson	Archie Chadd	26–7	Huntingburg	33–23
1937–38		Fort Wayne South Side	Burl Friddle	29–3	Hammond	34–32
1938–39		Frankfort	Everett Case	26–6	Franklin	36–22
1939–40		Hammond Technical	Lou Birkett	25–6	Mitchell	33–21
1940–41		Washington	Marion Crawley	27–5	Madison	39–33
1941–42		Washington	Marion Crawley	30–1	Muncie Burris	24–18
1942–43		Fort Wayne Central	Murray Mendenhall	27–1	Lebanon	45–40
1943–44		Evansville Bosse	Herm Keller	19–7	Kokomo	39–35
1944–45		Evansville Bosse	Herm Keller	25–2	South Bend Riley	46–36
1945–46		Anderson	Charles Cummings	22–7	Fort Wayne Central	67–53
1946–47		Shelbyville	Frank Barnes	25–5	Terre Haute Garfield	68–58
1947–48		Lafayette Jefferson	Marion Crawley	27–3	Evansville Central	54–42
1948–49		Jasper	Leo O'Neill	21–9	Madison	62–61
1949–50		Madison	Ray Eddy	27–1	Lafayette Jefferson	67–44
1950–51		Muncie Central	Art Beckner	26–4	Evansville Reitz	60–58
1951–52		Muncie Central	Jay McCreary	25–5	Indianapolis Technical	68–49
1952–53		South Bend Central	Elmer McCall	25–5	Terre Haute Gerstmeyer	42–41
1953–54		Milan	Marvin Wood	28–2	Muncie Central	32–30
1954–55		Indianapolis Attucks	Ray Crowe	30–1	Gary Roosevelt	97–74
1955–56		Indianapolis Attucks	Ray Crowe	31–0	Lafayette Jefferson	79–57
1956–57		South Bend Central	Elmer McCall	30–0	Indianapolis Attucks	67–55
1957–58		Fort Wayne South Side	Don Reichert	28–2	Crawfordsville	63–34
1958–59		Indianapolis Attucks	Bill Garrett	26–5	Kokomo	92–54
1959–60		East Chicago Washington	John Baratto	28–2	Muncie Central	75–59
1960–61		Kokomo	Joe Platt	28–1	Indianapolis Manual	68–66 (OT)
1961–62		Evansville Bosse	Jim Myers	26–2	East Chicago Washington	84–81
1962–63		Muncie Central	Dwight Tallman	28–1	South Band Central	65–61
1963–64		Lafayette Jefferson	Marion Crawley	28–1	Huntington	58–55
1964–65		Indianapolis Washington	Jerry Oliver	29–2	Fort Wayne North Side	64–57
1965–66		Michigan City Elston	Doug Adams	26–3	Indianapolis Technical	63–52
1966–67		Evansville North	Jim Rausch	27–2	Lafayette Jefferson	60–58
1967–68		Gary Roosevelt	Louis Mallard	22–5	Indianapolis Shortridge	68–60
1968–69		Indianapolis Washington	Bill Green	31–0	Gary Tolleston	79–76
1969–70		East Chicago Roosevelt	Bill Holsbauch	28–0	Carmel	76–62
1970–71		East Chicago Washington	John Molodet	29–0	Elkhart	70–60
1971–72		Connersville	Myron Dickerson	26–3	Gary West Side	80–63
1972–73		New Albany	Kirby Overman	21–7	South Bend Adams	84–79
1973–74		Fort Wayne Northrop	Bob Dille	28–1	Jeffersonville	59–56
1974–75		Marion	Bill Green	28–1	Loogootee	58–46
1975–76		Marion	Bill Green	23–5	Rushville	82–76
1976–77		Carmel	Eric Clark	22–7	East Chicago Washington	53–52
1977–78		Muncie Central	Bill Harrell	27–3	Terre Haute South	65–64 (OT)
1978–79		Muncie Central	Bill Harrell	24–5	Anderson	64–60
1979–80		Indianapolis Broad Ripple	Bill Smith	29–2	New Albany	73–66
1980–81		Vincennes Lincoln	Orlando Wyman	26–2	Anderson	54–52
1981–82		Plymouth	Jack Edison	28–1	Gary Roosevelt	75–74 (2OT)
1982–83		Connersville	Basil Mawbey	26–2	Anderson	63–62
1983–84		Warsaw	Al Rhodes	26–2	Vincennes Lincoln	59–56
1984–85		Marion	Bill Green	29–0	Richmond	74–67
1985–86		Marion	Bill Green	26–3	Anderson	75–56
1986–87		Marion	Bill Green	29–1	Richmond	69–56
1987–88		Muncie Central	Bill Harrell	28–1	Concord	76–53
1988–89		Lawrence North	Jack Keefer	25–4	Kokomo	74–57
1989–90		Bedford North Lawrence	Dan Bush	29–2	Concord	63–60
1990–91		Gary Roosevelt	Ron Heflin	30–1	Brebeuf Jesuit	51–32
1991–92		Richmond	George Griffith	24–5	Lafayette Jefferson	77–73 (OT)
1992–93		Jeffersonville	Mike Broughton	29–2	Ben Davis	66–61
1993–94		South Bend Clay	Tom DeBaets	27–2	Valparaiso	93–88 (OT)
1994–95		Ben Davis	Steve Witty	32–1	Merrillville	58–57
1995–96		Ben Davis	Steve Witty	22–6	New Albany	57-54 (2OT)
1996–97		Bloomington North	Tom McKinney	28–1	Delta	75–54
1997–98	4A	Pike	Alan Darner	28–1	Marion	57–54
1997–98	3A	Indianapolis Cathedral	Peter Berg	22–4	Yorktown	72–47
1997–98	2A	Alexandria	Garth Cone	20–6	Southwestern (Hanover)	57–43
1997–98	A	Lafayette Central Catholic	Chad Dunwoody	24–3	Bloomfield	56–48
1998–99	4A	North Central (Indianapolis)	Doug Mitchell	23–5	Elkhart Central	79–74
1998–99	3A	Plainfield	Dana Greene	26–1	Muncie Southside	77–64
1998–99	2A	Westview	Troy Neely	23–3	Paoli	71–52
1998–99	A	Tecumseh	Kevin Oxley	23–4	Lafayette Central Catholic	55–43
1999–00	4A	Marion	Moe Smedley	28–1	Bloomington North	62–56
1999–00	3A	Brebeuf Jesuit	Leo Klemm	24–2	Andrean	72–56
1999–00	2A	Westview	Troy Neely	25–3	Winchester Community	59–53
1999–00	A	Lafayette Central Catholic	Chad Dunwoody	23–5	Union (Dugger)	82–70
2000–01	4A	Pike	Alan Darner	26–3	Penn	56–42
2000–01	3A	Muncie Southside	Rick Baumgartner	23–3	Evansville Mater Dei	81–78 (OT)
2000–01	2A	Harding	Al Gooden	23–5	Batesville	73–70
2000–01	A	Attica	Ralph Shrader	21–6	Blue River Valley	64–62
2001–02	4A	Gary West Side	John Boyd	23–4	Pike	58–55
2001–02	3A	Delta	Paul Keller	22–6	Harding	65–54
2001–02	2A	Speedway	Trent Lehman	22–4	Bluffton	62–48
2001–02	A	Rossville	Jeff Henley	23–4	Barr-Reeve	79–68
2002–03	4A	Pike	Larry Bullington	29–0	DeKalb	65–52
2002–03	3A	Indianapolis Bishop Chatard	Dan Archer	22–2	Fort Wayne Elmhurst	78–44
2002–03	2A	Cass	Basil Mawbey	26–0	Forest Park	57–48
2002–03	A	Lafayette Central Catholic	Chad Dunwoody	18–9	Southwestern (Shelbyville)	68–64
2003–04	4A	Lawrence North	Jack Keefer	29–2	Columbia City	50–29
2003–04	3A	Evansville Mater Dei	John Goebel	21–6	Bellmont	63–45
2003–04	2A	Jimtown	Randy DeShone	25–2	Brownstown Central	63–59
2003–04	A	Waldron	Jason Delaney	27–0	Fort Wayne Blackhawk Christian	69–54
2004–05	4A	Lawrence North	Jack Keefer	24–2	Muncie Central	63–52
2004–05	3A	Washington	Dave Omer	27–2	Plymouth	74–72 (OT)
2004–05	2A	Forest Park	Tom Beach	23–4	Harding	68–63
2004–05	A	Lapel	Jimmie Howell	25–3	Loogootee	51–40
2005–06	4A	Lawrence North	Jack Keefer	29–0	Muncie Central	80–56
2005–06	3A	New Castle	Steve Bennett	21–6	Jay County	51–43
2005–06	2A	Forest Park	Tom Beach	25–3	Harding	61–55
2005–06	A	Hauser	Bob Nobbe	25–2	Tri-Central	64–36
2006–07	4A	East Chicago Central	Pete Trgovich	23–3	North Central (Indianapolis)	87–83
2006–07	3A	Plymouth	Jack Edison	25–2	Evansville Bosse	72–61
2006–07	2A	Northwestern	Jim Gish	25–2	Winchester	78–74 (2OT)
2006–07	A	Oregon-Davis	Travis Hannah	27–1	Barr-Reeve	63–52
2007–08	4A	Brownsburg	Joshua Kendrick	22–5	Marion	40–39
2007–08	3A	Washington	Gene Miiller	23–2	Harding	84–60
2007–08	2A	Fort Wayne Bishop Luers	James Blackmon Sr.	24–3	Winchester	69–67
2007–08	A	Triton	Jason Groves	25–2	Indianapolis Lutheran	50–42
2008–09	4A	Bloomington South	J. R. Holmes	26–0	Fort Wayne Snider	69–62
2008–09	3A	Princeton	Tom Weeks	29–0	Rochester	81–79 (OT)
2008–09	2A	Fort Wayne Bishop Luers	James Blackmon Sr.	23–4	Brownstown Central	67–49
2008–09	A	Jac-Cen-Del	David Bradshaw	25–2	Triton	66–55
2009–10	4A	North Central (Indianapolis)	Doug Mitchell	25–3	Warsaw	95–74
2009–10	3A	Washington	Gene Miiller	23–3	Gary Wallace	65–62 (OT)
2009–10	2A	Wheeler	Mike Jones	27–1	Park Tudor	41–38
2009–10	A	Bowman Academy	Marvin Rea	24–1	Barr-Reeve	74–52
2010–11	4A	Bloomington South	J. R. Holmes	26–2	Kokomo	56–42
2010–11	3A	Washington	Gene Miiller	24–4	Culver Academies	61–46
2010–11	2A	Park Tudor	Ed Schilling	26–2	Hammond Bishop Noll	43–42
2010–11	A	Indianapolis Metropolitan	Nick Reich	22–6	Triton	59–55
2011–12	4A	Carmel	Scott Heady	23–4	Pike	80–67
2011–12	3A	Guerin Catholic	Pete Smith	24–5	Norwell	64–48
2011–12	2A	Park Tudor	Ed Schilling	25–2	Bowman Academy	79–57
2011–12	A	Loogootee	Mike Wagoner	22–4	Rockville	55–52
2012–13	4A	Carmel	Scott Heady	25–2	Indianapolis Cathedral	57–53
2012–13	3A	Greensburg	Stacy Meyer	26–1	Fort Wayne Concordia	73–70 (OT)
2012–13	2A	Bowman Academy	Marvin Rea	18–9	Linton-Stockton	86–73
2012–13	A	Borden	Doc Nash	24–3	Triton	55–50
2013–14	4A	Indianapolis Arsenal Technical	Jason Delaney	27–2	Lake Central	63–59
2013–14	3A	Greensburg	Stacy Meyer	28–1	Bowman Academy	89–76
2013–14	2A	Park Tudor	Kyle Cox	24–4	Westview	84–57
2013–14	A	Marquette Catholic	Donovan Garletts	20–6	Barr-Reeve	70–66 (OT)
2014–15	4A	Homestead	Chris Johnson	29–2	Evansville Reitz	91–90 (OT)
2014–15	3A	Guerin Catholic	Pete Smith	22–8	Griffith	62–56
2014–15	2A	Park Tudor	Kyle Cox	26–2	Frankton	73–46
2014–15	A	Barr-Reeve	Bryan Hughes	27–2	Marquette Catholic	65–50
2015–16	4A	New Albany	Jim Shannon	27–1	McCutcheon	62–59
2015–16	3A	Marion	James Blackmon Sr.	23–7	Evansville Bosse	73–68
2015–16	2A	Lapel	Jimmie Howell	26–4	Indianapolis Howe	59–37
2015–16	A	Liberty Christian	Jason Chappell	26–4	Bloomfield	64–45
2016–17	4A	Ben Davis	Mark James	23–5	Fort Wayne North Side	55–52
2016–17	3A	Indianapolis Attucks	Chris Hawkins	25–4	Twin Lakes	73–71
2016–17	2A	Frankton	Brent Brobston	23–6	Crawford County	60–32
2016–17	A	Tindley	Bob Wonnell	24–5	Lafayette Central Catholic	51–49
2017–18	4A	Warren Central	Criss Beyers	32-0	Carmel	54-48
2017–18	3A	Culver Academies	Mark Galloway	23–6	Evansville Bosse	64–49
2017–18	2A	Oak Hill	Kevin Renbarger	26–5	Forest Park	56–44
2017–18	A	Morristown	Scott McClelland	28–2	Southwood	89–60
2018–19	4A	Carmel	Ryan Osborn	26–1	Ben Davis	60–55
2018–19	3A	Silver Creek	Brandon Hoffman	25–3	Culver Academies	52–49
2018–19	2A	Andrean	Brad Stangel	21–8	Linton-Stockton	59–54
2018–19	A	Fort Wayne Blackhawk Christian	Marc Davidson	28–2	Barr-Reeve	60–43
2019–20	4A	Cancelled due to the coronavirus pandemic				
2019–20	3A	Cancelled due to the coronavirus pandemic				
2019–20	2A	Cancelled due to the coronavirus pandemic				
2019–20	A	Cancelled due to the coronavirus pandemic				
2020–21	4A	Carmel	Ryan Osborn	26–2	Lawrence North	51–46 (OT)
2020–21	3A	Silver Creek	Brandon Hoffman	25–4	Leo	50–49
2020–21	2A	Fort Wayne Blackhawk Christian	Marc Davidson	27–3	Parke Heritage	55–40
2020–21	A	Barr-Reeve	Josh Thompson	29–2	Kouts	64–48
2021–22	4A	Indianapolis Cathedral	Jason Delaney	26–6	Chesterton	65–31
2021–22	3A	Beech Grove	Mike Renfro	22–6	Mishawaka Marian	53–43
2021–22	2A	Providence (Clarksville)	Ryan Miller	21–6	Central Noble	62–49
2021–22	A	North Daviess	Brent Dalrymple	27–3	Lafayette Central Catholic	48–46 (2OT)
2022–23	4A	Ben Davis	Don Carlisle	33–0	Kokomo	53–41
2022–23	3A	NorthWood	Aaron Wolfe	28–2	Guerin Catholic	66–63 (OT)
2022–23	2A	Fort Wayne Blackhawk Christian	Matt Roth	27–3	Linton-Stockton	52–45
2022–23	A	Indianapolis Lutheran	Remus Woods	20–7	Southwood	97–66
2023-24	4A	Fishers	Garrett Winegar	29-1	Ben Davis	65-56
2023-24	3A	Scottsburg	Eric Richardson	25-5	South Bend St. Joseph	67-57
2023-24	2A	Brownstown Central	Dave Benter	28-4	Wapahani	55-36
2023-24	1A	Fort Wayne Canterbury	Deric Adams	19-9	Bethesda Christian	48-41
2024-25	4A	Jeffersonsville	Sherron Wilkerson	24-5	Fishers	67-66 (OT)
2024-25	3A	South Bend St. Joseph	Eric Gaff	27-3	Crispus Attucks	56-52
2024-25	2A	Manchester	Eli Henson	26-2	University	59-54
2024-25	1A	Orleans	Tom Bradley	25-4	Clinton Prairie	64-55
2025-26	4A	Mt. Vernon	Joe Bradburn	28-3	Crown Point	52-50
2025-26	3A	Indianapolis Cathedral	Jason Delaney	25-5	New Haven	71-61
2025-26	2A	Parke Heritage	Rich Schelsky	27-4	Westview	57-56
2025-26	1A	Barr-Reeve	Heath Howington	28-1	Triton	50-37

== Team championships by year ==
Championships	School	Year
8	Muncie Central	1928, 1931, 1951, 1952, 1963, 1978, 1979, 1988
8	Marion	1926, 1975, 1976, 1985, 1986, 1987, 2000 (4A), 2016 (3A)
7	Washington	1930, 1941, 1942, 2005 (3A), 2008 (3A), 2010 (3A), 2011 (3A)
5	Carmel	1977, 2012 (4A), 2013 (4A), 2019 (4A), 2021 (4A)
4	Frankfort	1925, 1929, 1936, 1939
4	Lawrence North	1989, 2004 (4A), 2005 (4A), 2006 (4A)
4	Park Tudor	2011 (2A), 2012 (2A), 2014 (2A), 2015 (2A)
4	Indianapolis Attucks	1955, 1956, 1959, 2017 (3A)
3	Lebanon	1912, 1917, 1918
3	Franklin	1920, 1921, 1922
3	Martinsville	1924, 1927, 1933
3	Anderson	1935, 1937, 1946
3	Evansville Bosse	1944, 1945, 1962
3	Lafayette Jefferson	1916, 1948, 1964
3	Lafayette Central Catholic	1998 (A), 2000 (A), 2003 (A)
3	Pike	1998 (4A), 2001 (4A), 2003 (4A)
3	Bloomington South	1919, 2009 (4A), 2011 (4A)
3	Ben Davis	1995, 1996, 2017 (4A)
2
2	Wingate	1913, 1914
2	South Bend Central	1953, 1957
2	Fort Wayne South Side	1938, 1958
2	Indianapolis Washington	1965, 1969
2	East Chicago Washington	1960, 1971
2	Vincennes Lincoln	1923, 1981
2	Connersville	1972, 1983
2	Gary Roosevelt	1968, 1991
2	Westview	1999 (2A), 2000 (2A)
2	Forest Park	2005 (2A), 2006 (2A)
2	New Castle	1932, 2006 (3A)
2	Plymouth	1982, 2007 (3A)
2	Princeton Community	2009 (3A)
2	Fort Wayne Bishop Luers	2008 (2A), 2009 (2A)
2	North Central (Indianapolis)	1999 (4A), 2010 (4A)
2	Bowman Academy	2010 (A), 2013 (2A)
2	Greensburg	2013 (3A), 2014 (3A)
2	Guerin Catholic	2012 (3A), 2015 (3A)
2	Lapel	2005 (A), 2016 (2A)
2	New Albany	1973, 2016 (4A)
2	Barr-Reeve	2015 (A), 2021 (A)
2	Fort Wayne Blackhawk Christian	2019 (A), 2021 (2A)
2	Silver Creek	2019 (3A), 2021 (3A)
2	Jeffersonville	1993, 2025 (4A)
2	Indianapolis Cathedral	2022 (4A), 2026 (3A)

Beginning in the 1997–98 season, a class system was implemented under which four championships are awarded yearly.

== See also ==
- Hoosier Hysteria
- Indiana Basketball Hall of Fame
