= 2010 IHSAA Boys Basketball Championship =

The 2010 IHSAA Boys Basketball Championship was the 100th annual version in Indiana tournament history. High school basketball plays a significant role in the spring phenomenon known as “Hoosier Hysteria”. In 2010, Indiana high schools competed in 4 different classes - class A (the smallest schools), class 2A, class 3A, and class 4A.

== Brackets ==
* – Denotes overtime period

=== Class A Championship ===
Sectional Winners; March 13
49	Bowman Academy (20-1)	86
52	Pioneer (12-10)	36
Triton
50	Triton (22-2)	49
51	Fort Wayne Blackhawk Christian (16-7)	72
56	Covington (17-6)	77*
54	Southern Wells	71
Frankfort
55	Monroe Central (18-5)	68
53	Lafayette Central Catholic	60
60	Shawe Memorial (16-5)	60
58	Edinburgh (16-7)	61*
Martinsville
57	North Central (Farmersburg) (13-9)	80
59	Indianapolis Lutheran	64
63	Barr-Reeve (21-3)	60
64	Tecumseh (10-12)	40
Loogootee
61	Northeast Dubois (10-13)	46
62	Lanesville (15-9)	55

Regional finals March 13
49	Bowman Academy	72
51	Fort Wayne Blackhawk Christian	60
56	Covington	42
55	Monroe Central	67
58	Edinburgh	44
57	North Central (Farmersburg)	56
63	Barr-Reeve	69
62	Lanesville	50

Semifinals; March 20
49	Bowman Academy	89
55	Monroe Central	79
57	North Central (Farmersburg)	48
63	Barr-Reeve	59

State finals March 27
49	Bowman Academy	74
63	Barr-Reeve	52

=== Class 2A Championship ===
Sectional Winners; March 13
34	Boone Grove (19-4)	55
35	Fairfield (15-9)	40
North Judson
36	Eastside (13-9)	43
33	Wheeler (23-1)	62
38	Fort Wayne Bishop Luers (14-9)	68
39	Southwood (16-6)	70
Tipton
40	Guerin Catholic (14-10)	60
37	Carroll (Flora) (13-10)	50
43	Park Tudor (12-10)	44
44	South Ripley	30
Connersville
41	Winchester (20-4)	61
42	Centerville (16-6)	37
46	Tri-West Hendricks (17-5)	39
47	Brownstown Central (24-0)	43
Southridge
48	Forest Park (17-7)	61
45	South Knox (13-10)	36

Regional finals March 13
34	Boone Grove	59
33	Wheeler	73
39	Southwood	86
40	Guerin Catholic	72
43	Park Tudor	50
41	Winchester	41
47	Brownstown Central	42
48	Forest Park	44

Semifinals; March 20
33	Wheeler	68
39	Southwood	61
43	Park Tudor	47*
48	Forest Park	45

State finals March 27
33	Wheeler	41
43	Park Tudor	38

=== Class 3A Championship ===
Sectional Winners; March 13
17	Gary Wallace (16-4)	47
19	Plymouth (15-8)	35
Chesterton
20	West Lafayette (14-9)	54
18	Andrean (13-9)	45
21	Wawasee (16-7)	65
23	Fort Wayne Bishop Dwenger (14-8)	62
Blackford
22	Fort Wayne Elmhurst (16-5)	45
24	Yorktown (14-8)	35
28	Greensburg (20-2)	30
27	Mt. Vernon (Fortville) (22-2)	45
Shelbyville
26	Brebeuf Jesuit (14-8)	46
25	Danville (23-1)	47
30	Corydon Central (19-5)	45
31	Washington (19-3)	52
Washington
29	Sullivan (23-2)	35
32	Boonville (18-5)	54

Regional finals March 13
17	Gary Wallace	71
20	West Lafayette	52
21	Wawasee	85
22	Fort Wayne Elmhurst	88
27	Mt. Vernon (Fortville)	43
25	Danville	47
31	Washington	55
32	Boonville	47

Semifinals; March 20
17	Gary Wallace	57
22	Fort Wayne Elmhurst	47
25	Danville	38
31	Washington	57

State finals March 27
17	Gary Wallace	62
31	Washington	65*

=== Class 4A Championship ===
Sectional Winners; March 13
3	South Bend Washington (15-9)	42
1	Munster (23-2)	48
Michigan City
4	Warsaw (20-2)	64
2	Merrillville (20-3)	56
6	Fort Wayne North Side (10-13)	69
5	Carroll (Fort Wayne)	87
Marion
8	Muncie Central (13-10)	66
7	Lafayette Jefferson	52
11	Perry Meridian (15-9)	44
9	Noblesville (19-4)	65
Lawrence Central (Hinkle Fieldhouse)
10	North Central (Indianapolis) (21-3)	77
12	Ben Davis	67
15	Jeffersonville (20-4)	64
13	Martinsville (6-16)	51
Seymour
16	Evansville Harrison (15-8)	61
14	Bloomington South (22-0)	71

Regional finals March 13
1	Munster	31
4	Warsaw	40
5	Carroll (Fort Wayne)	50
8	Muncie Central	44
9	Noblesville	53
10	North Central (Indianapolis)	54*
15	Jeffersonville	58
14	Bloomington South	56

Semifinals; March 20
4	Warsaw	58
5	Carroll (Fort Wayne)	53
10	North Central (Indianapolis)	82
15	Jeffersonville	77

State finals March 27
4	Warsaw	74
10	North Central (Indianapolis)	95

== See also ==
- Indiana High School Boys Basketball Tournament
