= Crispus Attucks Museum =

Museum in Indianapolis, Indiana, US

- Established: May 1, 1998; 28 years ago
- Location: 1140 Dr. Martin Luther King Jr. St. Indianapolis, Indiana, U.S.
- Coordinates: 39°46′59″N 86°10′12″W
- Type: Community Museum
- Curator: Robert Chester
- Public transit access: Routes 6, 15, 25, 34; Indiana Pacers Bikeshare

Crispus Attucks Museum is a museum inside Crispus Attucks High School located in Indianapolis, Indiana. The museum is operated by the Indianapolis Public School (IPS) system and features exhibitions on local, state, national, and international African American history.

== History ==
Crispus Attucks Museum was established at the Crispus Attucks High School in May 1998. In 1990, IPS spent around $200,000 in renovations in an effort to invest in the Multicultural Education center, which included the renovation of the auxiliary gym where the museum is housed. The museum preserves Black history with displays that celebrate the school's culture, sports, and industrial arts, as well as displays that honor history beyond its walls.

The founding curator at the time of its inception, Gilbert L.Taylor, also served as a teacher in the Indianapolis Public School system. Taylor was a Crispus Attucks High School and an Indiana Central College graduate. He was also well connected in his community as part of Kappa Alpha Psi fraternity and Witherspoon Presbyterian Church.

Taylor, collected items for over eight years before the museum opened. The items collected for the gallery are both from Taylor's personal collection and from donors. The initial artifacts collected were old photos, certificates, diplomas, awards, fezzes from masonic orders, hot combs, a complete set of Crispus Attucks High School yearbooks, and history of the Attucks music department.

The museum was renovated in 2009.

== Exhibits ==
The museum is home for four galleries and 38 displays which include exhibits on African American settlements, the Underground Railroad, the Tuskegee Airmen, African textiles, and Indiana African American organizations. The "Tunnel of Rights" exhibit encompasses African Americans' resistance movements and highlights the work these movements did to achieve human, civil, economic and legal rights. The African American experience is highlighted in the exhibit "The Examination of Community". This exhibit gives tributes to key Indianapolis community features such as Lockfield Gardens, fourteen of the early African American elementary schools, and various Indianapolis jazz musicians.

In August 2023, the museum announced the newest addition to the museum, the exhibit, "Unmasked: The Anti-Lynching Exhibits of 1935 and Community Remembrance in Indiana". This exhibit captures the history of lynching in Indiana and the impact of its brutality. The anti-lynching exhibit was the result of over seven years of research and more than $60,000.00 in investment. The curators planned to move the exhibit to other locations in Indiana.

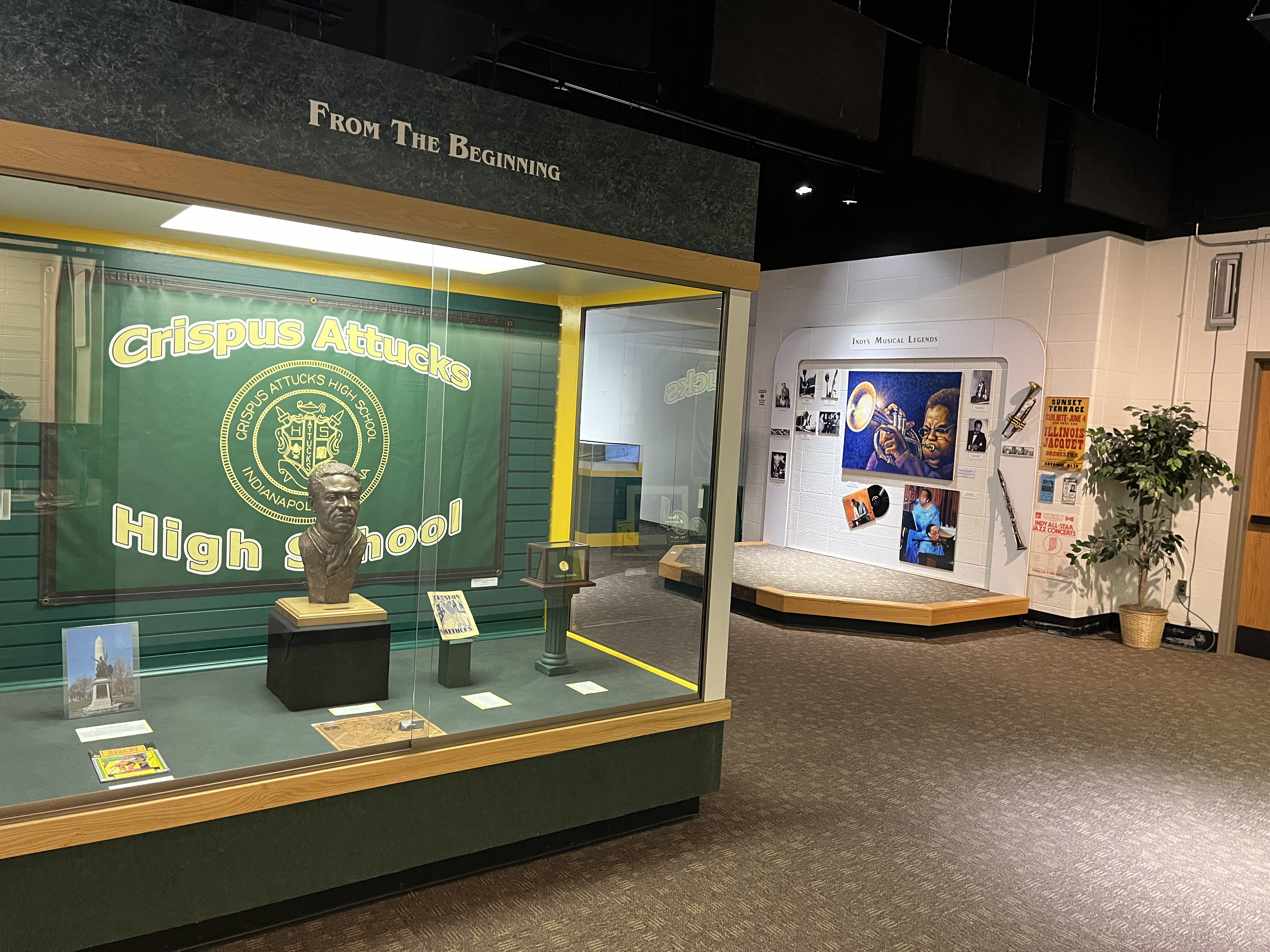
Crispus Attucks Museum Entryway

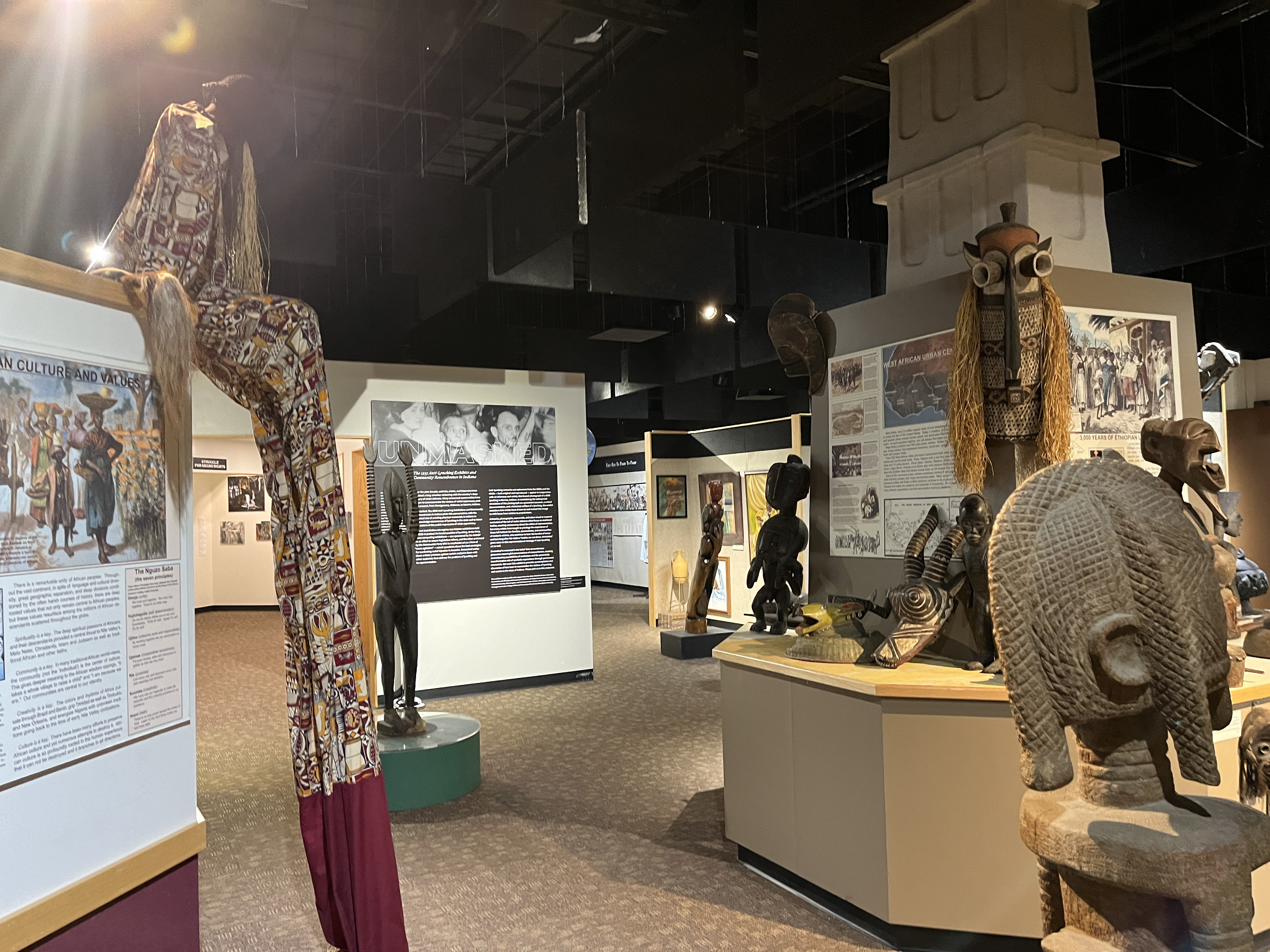
Crispus Attucks Museum Interior

== Community impact ==
Crispus Attucks High School, the first all Black high school in the state, is a respected organization in the Indianapolis community. The museum that it houses continues its role in promoting and sharing the community's cultural heritage. It is the third institution of its kind in Indianapolis that celebrates African American heritage and culture. The community partners make it a point to preserve its history by collaborating with its museum. For example, the "Unmasked: The Anti-Lynching Exhibits of 1935 and Community Remembrance in Indiana" exhibit in the museum is supported by a collaboration between IU Bloomington and the city of Indianapolis. The museum is owned and supported by the Indianapolis Public School system.

== Public service ==
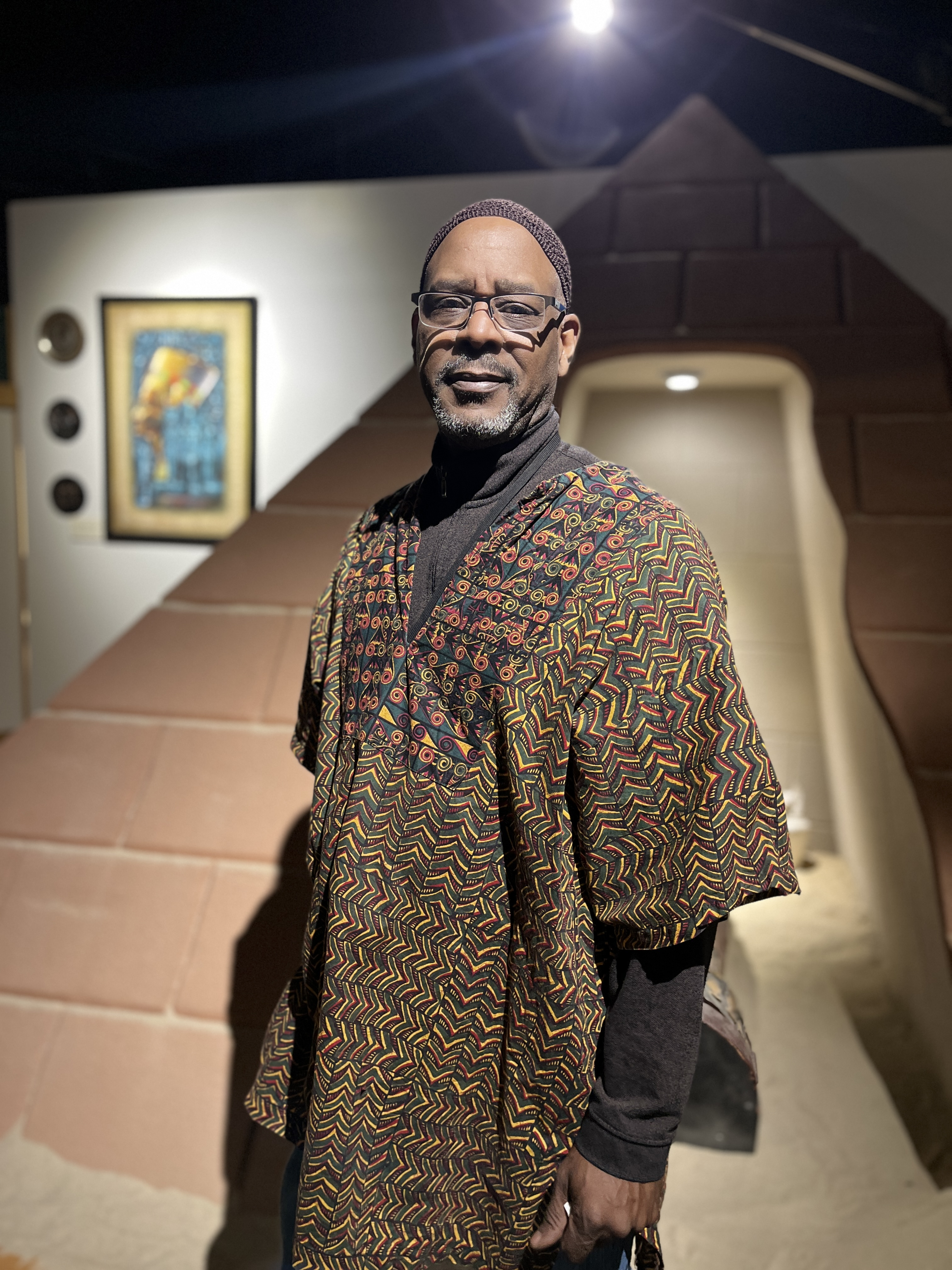
Robert Chester, current curator of Crispus Attucks Museum, 2024

Robert Chester is the current curator who overseas the daily operations of the museum. The museum is in operation Tuesday through Thursday from 10 am-6 pm and Saturday to Sunday 10 am-3 pm. The museum is open to the public by appointment. The building is located within Crispus Attucks High School at 1140 M.L.K., street door #13, Indianapolis, IN 46202 USA.

== See also ==
- List of museums focused on African Americans
- List of museums in Indiana
- List of attractions and events in Indianapolis
