= Clifford Wells =

American basketball coach (1896–1977)

- Wells pictured in Jambalaya 1950, Tulane yearbook

Biographical details
- Born: March 17, 1896; Indianapolis, Indiana, U.S.
- Died: August 15, 1977 (aged 81); Garland, Texas, U.S.

Coaching career (HC unless noted)
- 1917–1921: Bloomington HS (IN)
- 1921–1922: Columbus HS (IN)
- 1922–1945: Logansport HS (IN)
- 1945–1963: Tulane

Administrative career (AD unless noted)
- 1963–1966: Basketball HOF (director)

Head coaching record
- Overall: 254–171 (college)
- Basketball Hall of Fame; Inducted in 1972 (profile)
- College Basketball Hall of Fame; Inducted in 2006

W. R. Clifford "Cliff" Wells (March 17, 1896 – August 15, 1977) was an American basketball coach and administrator. As a high school basketball coach in Indiana he led his teams to winning more than 50 tournaments, including two Indiana state championships in 1919 and 1934. He was the Tulane University head coach from 1945 to 1963. He was the first full-time executive secretary and director of the Naismith Memorial Basketball Hall of Fame, serving from 1963 to 1966. He was inducted into the Indiana Basketball Hall of Fame in 1965. He was enshrined in the Basketball Hall of Fame as a contributor in 1972. Wells died on August 15, 1977, of an apparent heart attack, at his home in Garland, Texas.

== Head coaching record ==
=== College ===
Record table
Season	Team	Overall	Conference	Standing	Postseason
Tulane Green Wave (Southeastern Conference) (1945–1963)
1945–46	Tulane	15–7	4–5	8th	
1946–47	Tulane	22–9	8–5	5th	
1947–48	Tulane	23–3	13–1	2nd	
1948–49	Tulane	24–4	12–3	2nd	
1949–50	Tulane	15–7	8–4	T–3rd	
1950–51	Tulane	12–12	8–6	4th	
1951–52	Tulane	12–12	7–7	T–6th	
1952–53	Tulane	12–6	9–4	2nd	
1953–54	Tulane	15–8	10–4	T–3rd	
1954–55	Tulane	14–6	9–5	T–3rd	
1955–56	Tulane	12–12	7–7	5th	
1956–57	Tulane	15–9	9–5	T–3rd	
1957–58	Tulane	8–16	3–11	T–10th	
1958–59	Tulane	13–11	6–8	T–7th	
1959–60	Tulane	13–11	8–6	T–4th	
1960–61	Tulane	11–13	6–8	T–6th	
1961–62	Tulane	12–10	6–8	T–6th	
1962–63	Tulane	6–16	4–10	T–10th	
Tulane:		254–171	137–107		
Total:		254–171			
