= Jumping Johnny Wilson =

American basketball and baseball player (1927–2019)

Personal information
- Born: 1927
- Died: January 11, 2019 (aged 91–92)

Career information
- High school: Anderson High School
- College: Anderson College

Career history
- 1949–1954: Harlem Globetrotters

Career highlights
- Indiana Mr. Basketball (1946)

John E. Wilson (1927 – January 11, 2019), popularly known as Jumpin' Johnny Wilson, was an American basketball and baseball player. He gained his nickname for being the only player on his high school team able to dunk the basketball.

== Playing career ==
As a high school student in Anderson, Indiana at Anderson High School, he captained the Indians basketball team and was named Indiana's Mr. Basketball. In the high school championship game in 1946, he scored 30 of his team's 67 points in its victory over Fort Wayne Central High School, a record.

Wilson wished to attend Indiana University after he graduated in 1946, but was not recruited due to the Big Ten's unspoken policy of not recruiting African-American players. Instead, Wilson was recruited by Frank Pop Hedden and attended Anderson College, where he quickly became a star player. During his three-year career at Anderson, Wilson earned eleven letters, was selected All-conference three times, team M.V.P. three times, named as an All-American twice, and once finished third in the nation in scoring. As of 2008, Wilson still held the school record for career scoring average, season scoring average, and field goal attempts in a game.

After leaving Anderson College, Wilson played baseball for one year with the Chicago American Giants in the Negro leagues before playing basketball for the Harlem Globetrotters from 1949 to 1954. Wilson later returned to Anderson College in 1970 to finish earning his bachelor's degree in education.

== Coaching career ==
Wilson spent eight years as head basketball coach at Wood High School in Indianapolis, then sixteen years as head coach and athletic director at Malcolm X College, compiling a 378–135 (.737) record. Afterwards, Wilson worked as an assistant coach for Anderson College and Anderson High School. Wilson was the assistant basketball coach at Lock Haven University aside his son John E. Wilson Jr.

Wilson Sr. later moved to Virginia until the time of his death on January 11, 2019.

== Legacy ==
Wilson was the subject of the book "Jump Johnny Jump!" written by Dick Burdette.

Wilson was inducted into the Indiana Basketball Hall of Fame and the Anderson University Athletic Hall of Fame as part of its inaugural class in 1997. He was named one of Indiana's 50 best basketball players of all time.
