= Sally Suddith =

American basketball player (1910–1984)

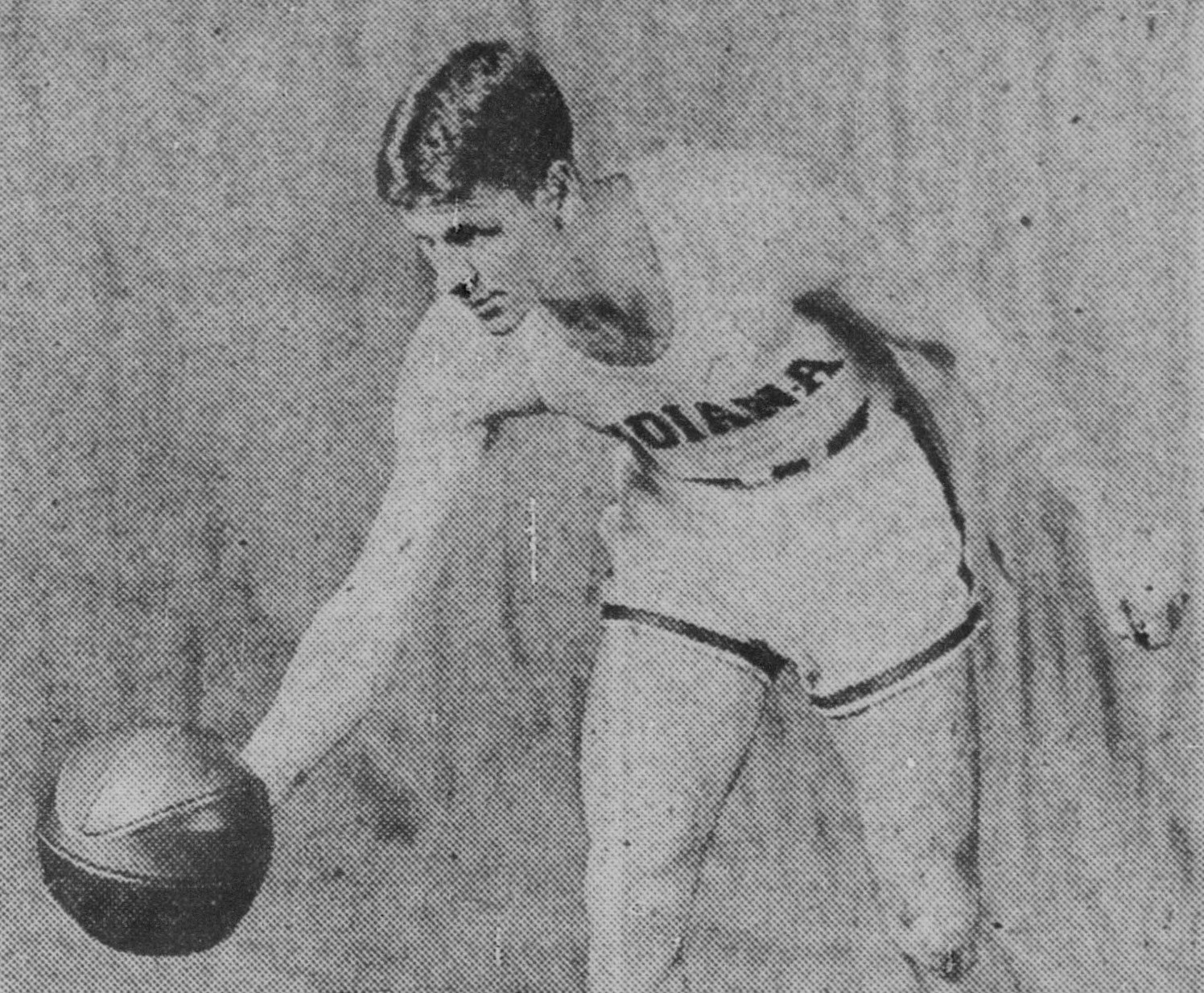
- Suddith, circa 1931

Personal information
- Born: December 26, 1910
- Died: September 14, 1984 (aged 73) Martinsville, Indiana, U.S.
- Listed height: 6 ft 1 in (1.85 m)
- Listed weight: 170 lb (77 kg)

Career information
- High school: Martinsville (Martinsville, Indiana)
- College: Indiana (1931–1932)
- Playing career: 1932–1945
- Position: Guard

Career history
- 1932–1933: Morgantown Green Lanterns
- 1932–1933: House of David
- 1935–1936: Columbus Noblitt Sparks
- 1936–1937: Indianapolis U.S. Tire
- 1939: Indianapolis Kautskys
- 1939–1940: Stewart-Warner Refrigerators
- 1940–1941: Indianapolis
- 1944–1945: Indianapolis Pure Oils

Arnold Eugene "Sally" Suddith (December 26, 1910 – September 14, 1984) was an American professional basketball player. He played for the Indianapolis Kautskys in the National Basketball League during the 1939–40 season and averaged 2.3 points per game.
