= Indiana Mr. Basketball =

Basketball honor for high school player in the US state of Indiana

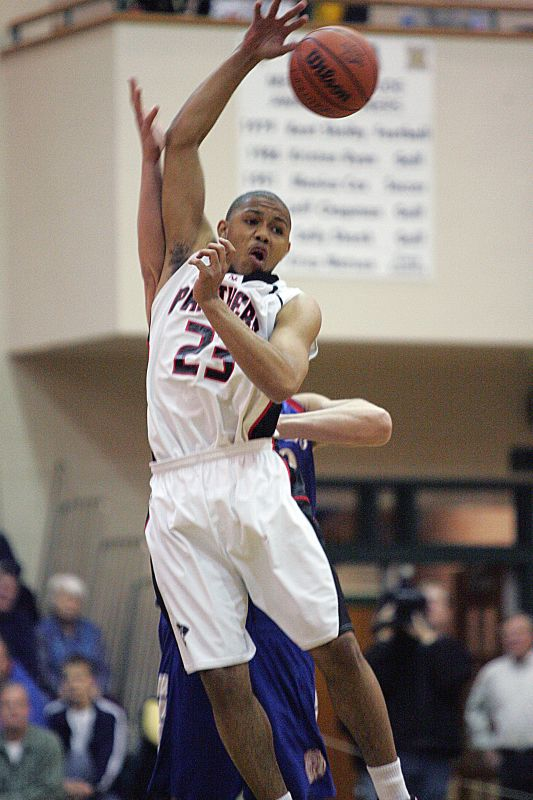
Eric Gordon playing for North Central High School (March 5, 2007)

The Indiana Mr. Basketball honor recognizes the top high school basketball player in the state of Indiana. The award is presented annually by The Indianapolis Star. The first Indiana Mr. Basketball was George Crowe of Franklin High School in 1939. The Indiana Mr. Basketball award is the oldest such award in the nation, predating the second oldest by over a decade; California would be the next state with such an award in 1950. Only seniors are eligible to win the award.

== Award winners ==
Year	Player	High School	College	NBA/ABA draft
1939	George Crowe	Franklin	Indiana Central	
1940	Ed Schienbein	Southport	Indiana	
1941	John Bass	Greenwood	none	
1942	Bud Brown	Muncie Burris	Georgetown	
1943, 1944	No Games (World War II)			
1945	Tom Schwartz	Kokomo	Indiana	
1946	Johnny Wilson	Anderson	Anderson	
1947	Bill Garrett	Shelbyville	Indiana	1951 NBA draft: 2nd Rnd, 16th overall, by the Boston Celtics
1948	Bob Masters	Lafayette Jefferson	Indiana	
1949	Dee Monroe	Madison	Kentucky	
1950	Ronald "Pat" Klein	Marion		
1951	Tom Harrold	Muncie Central	Colorado	
1952	Joe Sexson	Indianapolis Tech	Purdue	1956 NBA draft: 6th Rnd, 48th overall by the New York Knicks
1953	Hallie Bryant	Indianapolis Crispus Attucks	Indiana	
1954	Bobby Plump	Milan	Butler	
1955	Wilson Eison	Gary Roosevelt	Purdue	1959 NBA draft: 4th Rnd, 28th overall by the Minneapolis Laker
1956	Oscar Robertson	Indianapolis Crispus Attucks	Cincinnati	1960 NBA draft: 1st Rnd, 1st overall by the Cincinnati Royals
1957	John Coalmon	South Bend Central	Fordham	
1958	Mike McCoy	Ft. Wayne South Side	Miami (FL)	
1959	Jimmy Rayl	Kokomo	Indiana	1963 NBA draft: 3rd Rnd, 22nd overall by the Cincinnati Royals
1960	Ron Bonham	Muncie Central	Cincinnati	1964 NBA draft: 2nd Rnd, 18th overall by the Boston Celtics
1961 (tie)	Tom Van Arsdale	Indianapolis Manual	Indiana	1965 NBA draft: 2nd Rnd, 11th overall by the Detroit Pistons
1961 (tie)	Dick Van Arsdale	Indianapolis Manual	Indiana	1965 NBA draft: 2nd Rnd, 10th overall by the New York Knicks
1962	Larry Humes	Madison	Evansville	
1963	Rick Jones	Muncie Central	Miami (FL)	
1964	Dennis Brady	Lafayette Jefferson	Purdue	
1965	Billy Keller	Indianapolis Washington	Purdue	1969 NBA draft: 7th Rnd, 2nd by the Milwaukee Bucks
1966	Rick Mount	Lebanon	Purdue	1970 ABA Draft: 1st Rnd by the Indiana Pacers 1970 NBA draft: 8th Rnd, 132nd overall by the Los Angeles Lakers
1967	Willie Long	Ft. Wayne South Side	New Mexico	1971 NBA draft: 2nd Rnd, 35th overall by the Cleveland Cavaliers
1968	Billy Shepherd	Carmel	Butler	
1969	George McGinnis	Indianapolis Washington	Indiana	1971 ABA Draft: Indiana Pacers 1973 NBA draft: 2nd Rnd, 22nd overall by the Philadelphia 76ers
1970	Dave Shepherd	Carmel	Indiana; Mississippi	
1971	Mike Flynn	Jeffersonville	Kentucky	1975 NBA draft: 7th Rnd, 113th overall by the Philadelphia 76ers
1972	Phil Cox	Connersville	Butler; Gardner–Webb	
1973	Kent Benson	New Castle	Indiana	1977 NBA draft: 1st Rnd, 1st overall by the Milwaukee Bucks
1974 (tie)	Steve Collier	Southwestern	Cincinnati	
1974 (tie)	Roy Taylor	Anderson	Vincennes University North Texas State	
1975	Kyle Macy	Peru	Purdue; Kentucky	1979 NBA draft: 1st Rnd, 22nd overall by the Phoenix Suns
1976	Dave Colescott	Marion	North Carolina	
1977	Ray Tolbert	Madison Heights	Indiana	1981 NBA draft: 1st Rnd, 18th overall by the New Jersey Nets
1978	David Magley	South Bend LaSalle	Kansas	1982 NBA draft: 2nd round, 28th pick, Cleveland Cavaliers
1979	Steve Bouchie	Washington	Indiana	1983 NBA draft: 4th round, 78th pick, Detroit Pistons
1980	Jim Master	Ft. Wayne Harding	Kentucky	1984 NBA draft: 6th Rnd, 127th overall by the Atlanta Hawks
1981	Dan Palombizio	Michigan City Rogers	Purdue; Ball State	
1982	Roger Harden	Valparaiso	Kentucky	
1983	Steve Alford	New Castle	Indiana	1987 NBA draft: 2nd Rnd, 26th overall by the Dallas Mavericks
1984 (tie)	Troy Lewis	Anderson	Purdue	
1984 (tie)	Delray Brooks	Michigan City Rogers	Indiana; Providence	
1985	Jeff Grose	Warsaw	Northwestern	
1986	Mark Jewell	Lafayette Jefferson	Evansville	
1987 (tie)	Jay Edwards	Marion	Indiana	1989 NBA draft: 2nd Rnd, 33rd overall by the Los Angeles Clippers
1987 (tie)	Lyndon Jones	Marion	Indiana	
1988	Woody Austin	Richmond	Purdue	
1989	Pat Graham	Floyd Central	Indiana	
1990	Damon Bailey	Bedford North Lawrence	Indiana	1994 NBA draft: 2nd Rnd, 44th overall by the Indiana Pacers
1991	Glenn Robinson	Gary Roosevelt	Purdue	1994 NBA draft: 1st Rnd, 1st overall by the Milwaukee Bucks
1992	Charles Macon	Michigan City Elston	Ohio State; Central Michigan	
1993	Maurice "Kojak" Fuller	Anderson	Vincennes University; Southern	
1994	Bryce Drew	Valparaiso	Valparaiso	1998 NBA draft: 1st Rnd, 16th overall by the Houston Rockets
1995	Damon Frierson	Ben Davis	Miami (OH)	
1996	Kevin Ault	Warsaw	Missouri State	
1997	Luke Recker	DeKalb	Indiana; Iowa	
1998	Tom Coverdale	Noblesville	Indiana	
1999	Jason Gardner	Indianapolis North Central	Arizona	
2000	Jared Jeffries	Bloomington North	Indiana	2002 NBA draft: 1st Rnd, 11th overall by the Washington Wizards
2001	Chris Thomas	Indianapolis Pike	Notre Dame	
2002	Sean May	Bloomington North	North Carolina	2005 NBA draft: 1st Rnd, 13th overall by the Charlotte Bobcats
2003	Justin Cage	Indianapolis Pike	Xavier	
2004	A.J. Ratliff	Indianapolis North Central	Indiana	
2005	Luke Zeller	Washington	Notre Dame	
2006	Greg Oden	Lawrence North	Ohio State	2007 NBA draft: 1st Rnd, 1st overall by the Portland Trail Blazers
2007	Eric Gordon	Indianapolis North Central	Indiana	2008 NBA draft: 1st Rnd, 7th overall by the Los Angeles Clippers
2008	Tyler Zeller	Washington	North Carolina	2012 NBA draft: 1st Rnd, 17th overall by the Dallas Mavericks
2009	Jordan Hulls	Bloomington South	Indiana	
2010	Deshaun Thomas	Bishop Luers	Ohio State	2013 NBA draft: 2nd Rnd, 58th overall by the San Antonio Spurs
2011	Cody Zeller	Washington	Indiana	2013 NBA draft: 1st Rnd, 4th overall by the Charlotte Bobcats
2012	Gary Harris	Hamilton Southeastern	Michigan State	2014 NBA draft: 1st Rnd, 19th by the Chicago Bulls
2013	Zak Irvin	Hamilton Southeastern	Michigan	
2014	Trey Lyles	Indianapolis Tech	Kentucky	2015 NBA draft: 1st Rnd, 12th by the Utah Jazz
2015	Caleb Swanigan	Homestead	Purdue	2017 NBA draft: 1st Rnd, 26th by the Portland Trail Blazers
2016	Kyle Guy	Lawrence Central	Virginia	2019 NBA draft: 2nd Rnd, 55th by the New York Knicks
2017	Kris Wilkes	Indianapolis North Central	UCLA	
2018	Romeo Langford	New Albany	Indiana	2019 NBA draft: 1st Rnd, 14th by the Boston Celtics
2019	Trayce Jackson-Davis	Center Grove	Indiana	2023 NBA draft: 2nd Rnd, 57th by the Washington Wizards
2020	Anthony Leal	Bloomington South	Indiana	
2021	Caleb Furst	Blackhawk Christian School	Purdue	
2022	Braden Smith	Westfield	Purdue	2026 NBA draft: 2nd Rnd, 38th by the Chicago Bulls
2023	Markus Burton	Penn	Notre Dame; Indiana	
2024	Flory Bidunga	Kokomo	Kansas; Louisville	
2025	Braylon Mullins	Greenfield-Central	UConn	
2026	Luke Ertel	Mt. Vernon	Purdue	

=== Schools with multiple winners ===
School	Number of Awards	Years
Anderson	4	1946, 1974, 1984, 1993
Marion	4	1950, 1976, *1987, *1987
Indianapolis North Central	4	1999, 2004, 2007, 2017
Washington	4	1979, 2005, 2008, 2011
Kokomo	3	1945, 1959, 2024
Lafayette Jefferson	3	1948, 1964, 1986
Muncie Central	3	1951, 1960, 1963
Bloomington North	2	2000, 2002
Bloomington South	2	2009, 2020
Carmel	2	1968, 1970
Indianapolis Crispus Attucks	2	1953, 1956
Ft. Wayne South Side	2	1958, 1967
Gary Roosevelt	2	1955, 1991
Hamilton Southeastern	2	2012, 2013
Indianapolis Manual	2	*1961, *1961
Indianapolis Pike	2	2001, 2003
Indianapolis Tech	2	1952, 2014
Indianapolis Washington	2	1965, 1969
Madison	2	1949, 1962
Michigan City Rogers	2	1981, 1984
New Castle	2	1973, 1983
Valparaiso	2	1982, 1994
Warsaw	2	1985, 1996

* – Indicates a tie in which both recipients attended the same school

=== Colleges with multiple winners ===
College	Number of Awards	Years
Indiana	29	1940, 1945, 1947, 1948, 1953, 1959, 1961, 1961, 1969, 1970, 1973, 1977, 1979, 1983, 1984, 1987, 1987, 1989, 1990, 1997, 1998, 2000, 2004, 2007, 2009, 2011, 2018, 2019, 2020
Purdue	13	1952, 1955, 1964, 1965, 1966, 1975, 1981, 1984, 1988, 1991, 2015, 2021, 2022, 2026
Kentucky	6	1949, 1971, 1975, 1980, 1982, 2014
Ohio State	3	1992, 2006, 2010
North Carolina	3	1976, 2002, 2008
Cincinnati	3	1956, 1960, 1974
Butler	3	1954, 1968, 1972
Notre Dame	3	2001, 2005, 2023
Evansville	2	1962, 1986
Kansas	2	1978, 2024
Miami (FL)	2	1958, 1963
Vincennes University	2	1974, 1993

== See also ==
- Indiana Miss Basketball award
