= Indiana Basketball Hall of Fame =

Sports castle in New Castle, Indiana, US

Coordinates: 39°54′36″N 85°22′51″W

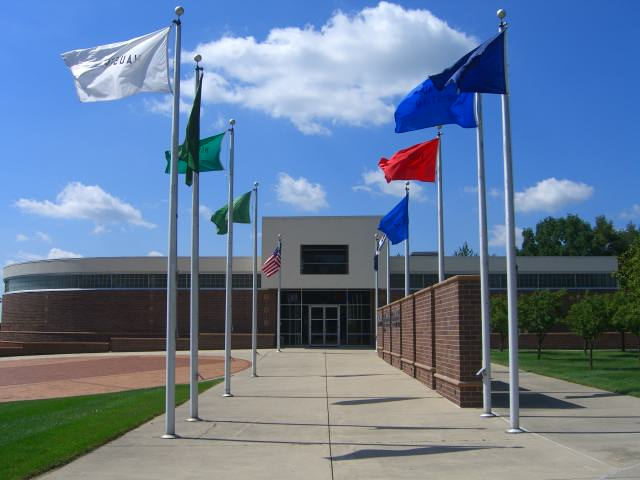
- Established: 1962
- Founded at: Indianapolis, Indiana
- Type: 501(c)(3) organization
- Headquarters: One Hall of Fame Court, New Castle, Indiana
- Official language: English
- Website: hoopshall.com

The Indiana Basketball Hall of Fame is a sports museum and hall of fame in New Castle, Indiana. While it honors men and women associated with high school, college, and professional basketball in Indiana, an emphasis is placed on the athlete's high school career for induction.

== History ==
The Indiana Basketball Hall of Fame was organized in 1962. The museum was in Indianapolis from 1970 to 1986; the present-day facility in New Castle opened in 1990.

In addition to featuring its Hall of Fame inductees, the museum includes photographs, pennants, and displays of artifacts of championship teams and their schools.

== Inductees ==
Players become eligible for induction into the Hall of Fame "twenty-six years after they graduate from high school." The first women became eligible for induction following the 2000–2001 season. On March 1, 2002, Cinda Rice Brown became the first woman inducted onto the Hall of Fame.

The Hall of Fame's website provides an official list of inductees; notables include John Wooden, Everett Case, Oscar Robertson, Lee H. Hamilton, Larry Bird, Del Harris, Baron Hill, Gregg Popovich, Bobby Plump, and Chuck Taylor.

== See also ==
- List of museums in Indiana
- Indiana High School Boys Basketball Tournament
