= 2001 in comics =

Notable events of 2001 in comics.

== Events and publications ==
=== January ===
- January 3: Jonathan (or Codename comrades), by Jane Espenson and Cliff Richards.
- January 16: Le manuscript, by Frank Giroud and Béhée, (Glenat), first chapter of the historical-religious saga Le décalogue; the story begins in 2001, in Oxford and continues backward until Hijrah.
- January 30: Dutch cartoonist Frits Müller wins the Inktspotprijs (edition 2000) for Best Political Cartoon.
- January 31: in Spirou, first chapter of The pagoda of the mists, by Roger Leloup.
- Uneasy allies by Greg Rucka and Steve Lieber (DC comics), first chapter of the miniseries Batman: Turning points.
- Assassins et gentlemen, by Denis Bodart and Fabien Vehlmann, first episode of Green manor.

=== February ===
- February 13: Don Markstein establishes the website Don Markstein's Toonopedia, in which he provides encyclopedic articles about thousands of characters from the world of comics, cartoons and animation.
- Belgian cartoonist Baudouin de Duve is arrested on the accusation of making an illegal The Adventures of Tintin comic book, Tintin in Thailand in Thailand. He is later cleared from all charges, as he had no intent to plagiarize the franchise and illegal copies were made without his permission or control.
- The story The Tomorrow People by Mark Millar and Adam Kubert is first published, which marks the debut of the series Ultimate X-Men.
- In Italy, a reboot of the series PKNA is launched, with a new title (PK^{2}), storyline and a supporting cast. In the first album (Ducklair, by Francesco Artibani and Claudio Sciarrone), the computer One, regular partner of the hero Paperinik and co-protagonist of the first series, is deactivated by his creator Everett Ducklair.

=== March ===
- March 1: Carl Barks, l’uomo dei paperi (the Ducks’men), (Disney Italia) homage to the great cartoonist by the Italian Disney authors; it includes Topolino e l’imperatore d’America (Mickey and the emperor of America), by Massimo De Vita, sequel to The golden helmet.
- March 10: Dutch comics artist Marten Toonder makes a suicide attempt. He survives and is brought back from his lonely home in Greystones, Ireland to a retirement home in Laren, North Holland.
- JL?, by Tom Peyer and Ethan Van Sciver, first chapter of the miniseries Justice Leagues (DC comics).
- Asterix and the actress, by Albert Uderzo; for the first time, Asterix and Obelix’s parents appear in a long story and the Gaulish hero has a love interest.
- La favorite, by Jean Dufaux and Ana Miralies (Darguad), first album of the historical-erotic series Djinn.
- The series MM Mickey Mouse Mystery Magazine (Disney Italia) ends.
- Il ranger dello spazio (The space ranger) (Bonelli) by Antonio Serra and Elena Pianta, first album of the unfortunate space opera series Gregory Hunter.
- The final Bungeishunjū Manga Award is handed out.

=== April ===
- April 3: Halloween (Disney Italia), by Francesco Artibani, Elisabetta Gnone and Alessandro Barbucci; first album of the series W.I.T.C.H.
- Superboy's legion (Elsewords), by Mark Farmer and Alan Davis.
- In X-Men 111, Prelude to destruction, by Scott Lodbell and Leinil Francis Yu, first chapter of the crossover X-Men, eve of destruction.
- First issue of Ultimate Marvel team-up.
- In Italy, first issue of Black (Coconino press), magazine of underground comics.

=== May ===
- May 23: in Anders & Co., The Beagle Boys vs. The Money Bin, by Don Rosa.
- La rose des sables (The rose of the sands) by Alna Maury and Luc Pathoens (Le Lombard); last story of Johann and Peewit.
- Western by Jean Van Hamme and Grzegorz Rosiński (Le Lombard).

=== June ===
- June 1: Big city girl, by Joss Whedon and Karl Moline (Dark Horse), first chapter of the miniseries Fray.
- June 15: in the French magazine Okapi, first table of the humoristic series, set in a provincial college, Zap College, by Tehem.
- The series Amelia Rules! begins.
- The little endless storybook by Jill Thompson (Vertigo).
- La mission by Jean Van Hamme and Christian Denayer (Dargaud); first album of the action series Wayne Shelton.
- Un diamant pour l’au de là (A diamond for the afterlife) – by Alejandro Jodorowsky and Francois Boucq; first album of the western series Bouncer, with a one-armed gunman as protagonist.
- USS Nebraska by Xavier Donson and Christopher Bec (Les humanoides associè), first chapter of the fantastic trilogy Sanctuaire.
- La scomparsa di Amanda Cross (Amanda Cross’ disparition), by Claudio Nizzi and Massimo Bonfatti (Bonelli); first album of the semiserious trilogy about the private eye Leo Pulp.

=== July ===
- July 10: In Topolino, Intrigo a Duckport (Intrigue in Duckport) by Alberto Savini and Silvio Camboni; first episode of the Bay tales saga. The series, autonomous from the duck universe, is set in the 19th century and tells the adventures of the two mariners and treasure seekers Moby and Fethry Duck; it lasts until 2005.
- July 13: French cartoonist Piem is inducted into the Légion d'Honneur.
- In New X-Men (Marvel), the story arc E is for extinction, by Grant Morrison and Frank Quitely, begins.

=== August ===
- First issue of The punisher (Marvel knights)
- In uncertain times, by Pierre Christin and Jean-Claude Mezieres (Dargaud).

=== September ===
- September 22–23: During the Stripdagen in Den Bosch Daan Jippes wins the Stripschapprijs. The comics magazine Stripper receives the P. Hans Frankfurtherprijs.
- September 24: The New Yorker publishes a seemingly completely black cover to commemorate the victims of the September 11 terrorist attacks, which actually shows the silhouette of the Twin Towers of the World Trade Center. The design is by Françoise Mouly, based on an initial idea by Art Spiegelman. Inside the issue are no cartoons, out of respect for the victims, except for one solemn cartoon by George Booth, starring his character Mrs. Rittershouse.
- September 29: The strange encounter by Jean Van Hamme and Ted Benoit (Editions Blake et Mortimer); the story had been prepublished in Telerama.

=== October ===
- October 22: In Kalle Anka & co, The crown of the crusader kings, by Don Rosa.
- In the Italian magazine W.I.T.C.H., Un giorno lo incontrerai (A day you will mett him) by Elisabetta Gnone and Alessandro Barbucci; debut of the Prince Phobos, the main villain of the series.
- Blue pills by Frederick Peeters (Atrabile)

=== November ===
- First chapter of The Dark Knight Strikes Again, by Frank Miller (DC Comics)
- Harlequin Valentine by Neil Gaiman and John Bolton (Dark Horse)
- Dernier train pour Washington (Last train for Washington) by Francois Corteggiani and Michel-Blanc Dumont, twelfth album of Blueberry's youth (Dargaud).
- Le royame sous la sable (The kingdom under the sand) – by Jean Van Hamme and Grzegorz Rosiński, twenty-sixth album of the series Thorgal (Le Lombard).

=== December ===
- December 19: Marc Cuadrado's gag comic Parker & Badger debuts in Spirou.
- December 31: The final episode of Toon van Driel's gag comic Hullie appears in Algemeen Dagblad.
- First issue of the third Doom Patrol series and of The Legion (DC comics).
- First issue of the miniseries Lupin the Third Millennium (Kappa edizioni), realized by Italian authors under the supervision of Monkey Punch, creator of the character.
- Les Steenfort by Jean Van Hamme and Francis Valles (Glénat), last chapter of Les maitres de l’orge; the volume summarizes the events of the brewers’ family told in the miniseries, providing several insights.

=== Specific date unknown ===
- Milton Griepp founds online trade publication ICv2 in January.
- Marvel Comics withdraws from the Comics Code Authority and established its own rating system for its publications.
- The merger of AOL and Time Warner, parent of DC Comics was completed, the merger name was AOL Time Warner.
- WildStorm founded its Eye of the Storm imprint.
- CMX established by DC Comics.
- The final episode of Ralph Dunagin's Dunagin's People is published.
- In the Syracuse University newspaper The daily orange, first strip of The Perry Bible fellowship, by Nicholas Gurewitch.
- Carnera, la montagna che cammina (Primo Carnera, the walking mountain) by Davide Toffolo (Biblioteca dell’immagine).
- Fourth and last episode of Milo Manara’s erotic series Click.
- Love Is Like a Hurricane, a Japanese manga written and illustrated by Tokiya Shimazaki, is launched.
- Gary Panter releases his graphic novel Cola Madnes.
- Jeroom creates his gag comic Tettenman.

== Deaths ==
=== January ===
- January 6:
  - Leo Nowak, American comics artist (Superman, Robotman) and political cartoonist, dies at age 93.
  - Guido Scala, Italian comics artist (Disney comics), dies at age 64.
- January 9: Carol Voges, Dutch illustrator and comics artist (De Avonturen van Pa Pinkelman, Jimmy Brown, Sportheld nr. 1, Professor Créghel), dies at age 75.
- January 12: Gian Luigi Bonelli, Italian comics writer (Tex Willer, Zagor), dies at age 92.
- January 23: Fred Ray, American comics cover artist (Superman) and redesigner of Superman's "S" symbol, dies at age 80.

=== February ===
- February 3: Neg Cochran, American comics artist (continued Herky, Otto Honk, Out Our Way), dies at age 87.
- February 6: Douglas Borgstedt, American cartoonist and comics artist (The Pet Set), dies at age 90.
- February 7: Lazar Stanojević, Serbian comics artist (Svermironi), dies at age 69.
- February 10: Miné Okubo, American comics artist and writer (Citizen 13660), dies at age 88.
- February 14: Michel Crespin, French comic artist (Armalite 16, Élie), dies at age 45.
- February 19: Adolfo Mazzone, Argentine comics artist (Piantadino), dies at age 86.

=== March ===
- March 1: Torsten Bjarre, Swedish animator and comics artist (Flygsoldat 113 Bom, Lilla Fridolf, Oscar), dies at age 85.
- March 4: Fred Lasswell, American comics artist (drew Barney Google and Snuffy Smith between 1942 and 2001), dies at age 84.
- March 5: Necmi Riza Ayça, Turkish cartoonist, dies at age 86 or 87.
- March 15: Brasser, Belgian political cartoonist (Prik), dies at age 64.
- March 22:
  - Pierre Brochard, French comic artist (Zéphyr, Le Chevalier de Saint-Clair, Alex et Eurêka), dies at age 79.
  - William Hanna, American animator (Hanna-Barbera comics, Tom & Jerry, The Flintstones, Scooby-Doo), dies at age 90.
  - Edith Oppenheim-Jonas, German-Swiss comics artist (Papa Moll), dies at age 94.
- March 26: Bill Yates, American comics artist (Professor Phumble, Benjy), writer (Redeye) and comic strip editor for King Features Syndicate, dies at age 79.
- March 31: Luciana Giussiani, Italian comics writer (Diabolik), dies at age 72.

=== April ===
- April 3: Ray Osrin, American cartoonist, animator and comics artist (worked for Archie Comics, Charlton Comics, Dell Comics and Gold Key Comics, assisted on Barney Google and Snuffy Smith and Morty Meekle), dies at age 72.
- April 4: Ed "Big Daddy" Roth, American artist, cartoonist, illustrator, pinstriper, custom car designer and builder (Rat Fink), dies at age 69.
- April 16: Mittéï (Hao), Belgian comics artist (Nine et Mitsou, Indésirable Désiré, Bonaventure, continued Modeste et Pompon between 1963 and 1975) and writer, dies at age 68.
- April 19: Henry Boltinoff, American comics artist (Stoker the Broker), dies at age 87.
- April 21: Bernard Venables, British comics artist (Mr. Digwell, Mr. Crabtree Goes Fishing), dies at age 94.

=== May ===
- May 14: Eric Bradbury, British comics artist (Tharg the Mighty, Charles Peace, The Leopard from Lime Street, The House of Dolmann), dies at age 80.
- May 27: Claude Bordet, aka Claudy, French comics artist, dies at age 80.
- May 29: Bill Bunce, American illustrator and comics artist (comics for Association of American Railroads), dies at age 97.

=== June ===
- June 1: Hank Ketcham, American comics artist and animator (Dennis the Menace), dies at age 81.
- June 14: Barb Rausch, American comics writer and artist (Barbie comics, Disney comics), dies at age 60.
- June 15: Hurey, Belgian comics artist (De Fratsen van Jan Heibel, Ketje & Co, continued De Lustige Kapoentjes and Piet Fluwijn en Bolleke, assisted Marc Sleen, Jean-Pol and Arthur Berckmans), dies at age 63.
- June 17: Hugo Díaz Jiménez, Costa Rican cartoonist and comics artist (Las Fisgonas de Paso Ancho), dies at age 70 from bone marrow cancer.
- June 22: George Evans, American comics artist (Two-Fisted Tales, Frontline Combat, The Haunt of Fear, Weird Science, Crime SuspenStories, Shock SuspenStories) dies at age 81.
- June 25: George Wilhelms, American comic artist (drew comics for Fiction House, Real Life Comics, American Comics Group and Gold Key Comics), dies at age 88.
- June 26: Tove Jansson, Finnish novelist, illustrator and comics artist (The Moomins), dies at age 86.
- June 27: Kees Stip, Dutch poet and comics writer (scripted De Wolken by Nico Visscher), dies at age 87.
- Specific date unknown: Basil Reynolds, British comics artist (Skit, Skat and the Captain), dies at age 84.

=== July ===
- July 7: Toni Pagot, Italian comics artist, cartoonist and animator (Calimero), dies at age 79.
- July 10: Françoise Bertier, French illustrator and comic artist (Line), dies at age 86.
- July 11: Herman Brood, Dutch rock artist, painter and comics artist (Vaste Prik), commits suicide at age 55 by jumping off the top of a hotel building.
- July 16: Morris, Belgian comics artist (Lucky Luke), dies at age 77.
- July 16: Opland, Dutch political cartoonist and comics artist (De Wonderlijke Avonturen van Anna), dies at age 73 from bone cancer.
- July 22: Eduardo Muñoz Bachs, Spanish-Cuban poster and comics artist (El Cuento), dies at age 64.
- July 25: Endre Lukács, Hungarian-Dutch comics artist (Disney comics), dies at age 95.
- July 27: Martha Orr, American comics artist (Apple Mary, prototype for Mary Worth), dies at age 93.
- July 31: Youji Muku, Japanese comics artist and magazine editor (made S&M comics for various erotic magazines), dies at age 73.
- Specific date unknown: Maurice Chénechot, aka Chen, aka Mac, French comics artist and illustrator (Riri), dies at age 88.

=== August ===
- August 10:
  - Jerry DeFuccio, American comics writer and editor (EC Comics, Mad), dies at age 76 from cancer.
  - Pericle Luigi Giovannetti, Swiss painter and comics artist (Max), dies at age 85.
- August 15: Jim Russell, Australian cartoonist (The Potts), dies at age 92.
- August 16: Len Ward, British comic artist (Sonny Silhouette, Jenkins, Rex Martin), dies at age 77.
- August 25: Chuck Cuidera (usually credited as "Charles Nicholas"), American comics artist (Blackhawk), dies at age 85.
- August 30: Claude Marin, French comic artist (Disney comics), dies at age 70.

=== September ===
- September 1: José Cubero Valero, Spanish comic artist (Don Quijote de la Mancha, comics based on Ovide and the Gang), dies at age 77.
- September 13:
  - Frédéric-Antonin Breysse, French comic artist (Oscar et Isidore), dies at age 93.
  - Johnny Craig, American comics artist (EC Comics), dies at age 75.
- September 21: Luis Garcia Gallo, A.K.A. Coq, Spanish comic artist (Mam'zelle Souris, Azor, Nanette, La Fée Aveline, Yvette, Docteur Gaudéamus, Médor), dies at age 94.
- September 26: Fred Neher, American comics artist (Life's Like That, Otto Watt), dies at age 97 or 98.
- September 30: George Gately, American comics artist (Heathcliff, Hapless Harry), dies at age 72 from a heart attack.
- September 30: Bjørn Frank Jensen, Danish animator and comics artist (Nop, Disney comics, worked on Pelle Svanslös), dies at age 81.

=== October ===
- October 7: Herbert Block, American political cartoonist, dies at age 91.
- October 20: Roy Ullyet, British sports cartoonist, dies at age 86.

=== November ===
- November 6:
  - Chris Ishii, American animator and comic artist (Li'l Neebo), dies at age 81.
  - Gray Morrow, American comics artist (co-creator of Man-Thing and El Diablo, worked for Eerie, Creepy and Blazing Combat, assisted on Prince Valiant, Big Ben Bolt, Secret Agent X-9, continued Friday Foster, Buck Rogers in the 25th Century, Tarzan) commits suicide at age 67.
- November 8: Ryuichi Yokoyama, Japanese comics artist, (Fuku-Chan, The Beggar King, ) dies at age 92.
- November 20: Bob Moore, American animator and comics artist (Disney comics), dies at age 81.
- November 21:
  - Ronn Foss, American comic artist (drew for fanzines like Alter Ego and Komix Illustrated), dies at age 72.
  - Seymour Reit, aka Sy Reit, American animator, writer, screenwriter, comics writer (Little Lulu, Mad Magazine) and comics artist (worked for Eisner & Iger), dies at age 83.
- November 25: Harry Devlin, American painter, illustrator and comics artist (Fullhouse - later retitled Raggmopp), dies at age 83.
- November 28: Bob Gustafson, American comics writer (Specs, assisted on Joe Palooka) and artist (assisted/continued Tillie the Toiler and Beetle Bailey), dies at age 81.

=== December ===
- December 2: Chase Craig, American animator, scriptwriter and comics writer (Looney Tunes comics, Odd Bodkins, Disney comics, Hanna-Barbera comics), dies at age 91.
- December 6: Carla Hansen, Danish comics writer (Rasmus Klump), dies at age 95.
- December 10: Dave Graue, American comic artist (continued Alley Oop), dies at age 75 in a car accident.
- December 16: Derek Bauer, South-African comics artist and cartoonist, dies in a car accident at age 45 or 46.
- December 19: Dan DeCarlo, American comics artist (Archie Comics), dies at age 82 from a heart attack.

=== Specific date unknown ===
- Charlie Bood, Swedish illustrator and comics artist (Allan Kämpe, Sme-Olle), dies at age 78 or 79.
- Neg Cochran, American comics artist, (Out Our Way, continued Herky and Otto Honk), dies at age 87 or 88.
- Roger Emiel de Ruyck, aka Roderyck, Belgian illustrator, painter and comics artist (Jan Zonder Vrees), dies at age 83.
- Nat Edson, American comics artist (worked for Dell Comics/Western Publishing), dies at age 91 or 92.
- Anselmus Kengen, aka Kari, Dutch illustrator and cartoonist (advertising comics), dies at age 84 or 85.
- Dick Lucas, Canadian cartoonist (celebrity comic about Juliette Béliveau), dies at age 85 or 86.

== Awards ==
- Ted Goff receives the Silver T-Square award from the National Cartoonist Society in a unanimous vote.

== Exhibitions ==
- August 26–September 30: "Historic Virtuoso Cartoonists" (part of the Festival of Cartoon Art) (Columbus Recreation and Parks Department Cultural Arts Center, Columbus, Ohio) — featuring Thomas Nast, Joseph Keppler, Frederick Burr Opper, Richard Felton Outcault, Winsor McCay, Nell Brinkley, George Herriman, Edwina Dumm, Rube Goldberg, Milton Caniff, Walt Kelly, Charles M. Schulz, Willard Mullin, James Thurber, Oliver Harrington, Art Young, Jay Norwood Darling, Rollin Kirby, and Jeff MacNelly
- September 10, 2001–Jan. 15, 2002: "Calvin and Hobbes, Sunday Pages 1985-1995" (part of the Festival of Cartoon Art) (Cartoon Research Library Reading Room Gallery, Ohio State University)
- November 23—December 31: "Plewds! Squeams! and Spurls!" (Balazo Gallery, San Francisco, California) — comic book and street-influenced group show featuring Spain Rodriguez, Xylor Jane, and others.

== Conventions ==
- February 17–18: Alternative Press Expo (Herbst Pavilion, Fort Mason, San Francisco)
- February 25: Portland Comic Book Show (Memorial Coliseum at Rose Quarter, Portland, Oregon) — guests include Bernie Wrightson, Val Mayerik, Steven Grant, Anne Timmons, and Pete Woods
- March 2–4: MegaCon (Orange County Convention Center, Orlando, Florida) — guests include George Pérez, Mark Waid, Steve Epting, Rick Magyar, Scot Eaton, Andrew Hennessy, Wil Quintana, Barbara Kesel, Steve McNiven, Tom Simmons, Morry Hollowell, Bart Sears, Andy Smith, Michael Atiyeh, Ron Marz, Greg Land, Drew Geraci, Brandon Peterson, John Dell, Andrew Crossley, Jim Chuen, Don Hillsman II, and Caesar Rodriguez
- March 9: National Comic Book, Art, Toy, and Sci-Fi Expo I (St. Paul's Church Auditorium, New York City)
- March 31: Small Press and Alternative Comics Expo (S.P.A.C.E.) (Ohio Expo Center, Rhodes Center, Columbus, Ohio) — 440 attendees; special guest: Dave Sim. First presentation of the Howard Eugene Day Memorial Award ("the Day Prize")
- March 31–April 1: Chicago ComicFest (Ramada Plaza Hotel O'Hare, Rosemont, Illinois) — produced by the organizers of the Motor City Comic Con
- April 1–3: WonderCon (Oakland Convention Center, Oakland, California)
- April 27–29: Pittsburgh Comicon (Radisson Hotel Pittsburgh ExpoMart, Monroeville, Pennsylvania) — guests include Frank Miller, Gilbert Hernandez, Jaime Hernandez, Frank Cho, Dave Cooper, Dan Clowes, Mark Schultz, Scott McDaniel, Tom Savini, Chyna, Michonne Bourriague, Paul Blake, Claire Stansfield, Alexandra Tydings, Jeff Smith, Terry Moore, Dean Haspiel, and Josh Neufeld
- May 18–20: Motor City Comic Con I (Novi Expo Center, Novi, Michigan) — guests include Sergio Aragonés, Todd Dezago, David Finch, Franchesco, Andy Lee, Steve Lieber, Paul Jenkins, Jason Moore, James O'Barr, Michael Avon Oeming, Brian Pulido, Stan Sakai, Chris Sprouse, J. Michael Straczynski, Michael Turner, Randy Zimmerman, Murphy Anderson, Pam Bliss, Mark Crilley, Marshall Dillon, Dick Giordano, David W. Mack, Eddy Newell, Martin Nodell, Mike Okamoto, Diana Okamoto, Jim Ottaviani, Greg Rucka, Billy Tucci, and Chris Yambar
- May 26–27: Comics 2001 (Bristol, England, U.K.) — presentation of the National Comics Awards; official guests include Eddie Campbell, D'Israeli, Gary Spencer Millidge, Tony Rollinson, Tim Sayer, Dave Gibbons, Staz Johnson, Sean Phillips, Charlie Adlard, Greg Staple, Metaphrog, Bob Schreck, Alan Grant, John McCrea, Dez Skinn, and Steve Conley
- June 8–10: Heroes Convention (Charlotte Convention Center, Charlotte, North Carolina) — guests include Bob Almond, Jim Amash, Murphy Anderson, Mark Bagley, John Beatty, Dan Brereton, Frank Brunner, Steven Butler, Nick Cardy, KC Carlson, Richard Case, Sean Chen, Mark Chiarello, Alan Davis, Todd Dezago, Johnna Draper Carlson, Dick Giordano, Jimmy Gownley, Cully Hamner, Scott Hampton, Scott Hanna, Tony Harris, Irwin Hasen, Adam Hughes, Jamal Igle, Georges Jeanty, Phil Jimenez, Drew Johnson, Dan Jolley, Nat Jones, Greg Keyes, Jim Krueger, Bob Layton, Mark Lipka, David W. Mack, Nathan Massengill, Pop Mhan, Phil Noto, Michael Avon Oeming, Paul Pope, James Pruett, Joe Pruett, Joe Quesada, Robin Riggs, Budd Root, Craig Rousseau, Julius Schwartz, Walter Simonson, Louise Simonson, Brian Stelfreeze, Karl Story, Roy Thomas, Tim Townsend, George Tuska, Dexter Vines, Loston Wallace, Karl Waller, and Mike Wieringo
- July 6: National Comic Book, Art, Toy, and Sci-Fi Expo II (St. Paul's Church Auditorium, New York City)
- July 19–22: Comic-Con International (San Diego Convention Center, San Diego, California): 53,000 attendees; official guests: Brian Michael Bendis, John Buscema, Michael Chabon, Frank Cho, Julie Doucet, Brian Froud, Wendy Froud, Gene Ha, Joe R. Lansdale, Russell Myers, P. Craig Russell, Kim Stanley Robinson, Spider Robinson, Alvin Schwartz, Dan Spiegle, Jhonen Vasquez, Judd Winick, and Bernie Wrightson
- August 17–19: Wizard World Chicago (Rosemont Convention Center, Rosemont, Illinois) — 40,000+ attendees; guest of honor: Alex Ross; special guests: Kevin Smith, Jason Mewes, Gene Simmons, Peter Mayhew, David Prowse, Kenny Baker, Kimmie Kappenberg from Survivor, James Marsters, and Juliet Landau
- August 18–19: "Love is... CAPTION 2001" (Oxford Union Society, Oxford, England)
- August 24–26: Fan Expo Canada (Metro Toronto Convention Centre, Toronto, Ontario, Canada) — 15,359 attendees; guests include William Shatner, James Doohan, Peter Mayhew, Traci Lords, Ethan Phillips, Ted Raimi, Ian Churchill, Jeph Loeb, Carlos Pacheco, Mika Akitaka, and Scott McNeil
- August 30–September 2: Dragon Con (Hyatt Regency Atlanta/Marriott Marquis, Atlanta, Georgia) — 20,000+ attendees; guests include Don Bluth, Alice Cooper, Anthony Daniels, and James Doohan
- September 14–16: Small Press Expo/International Comics and Animation Festival (SPX/ICAF) (Bethesda, Maryland) — events canceled due September 11 attacks
- September 16: SP-Xiles (Brooklyn, New York) — created to replace canceled Small Press Expo; raises $1,925.00 for the American Red Cross and the New York Fire Fighter's 9-11 Relief Fund
- September 15–16: HoustonCon (Holiday Inn, Houston, Texas) — sponsored by Bedrock City Comics; guests include Harry Knowles, John Lucas, and Scott Gilbert
- September 28–29: Festival of Cartoon Art (Ohio State University, Columbus, Ohio) — "Historic Virtuoso Cartoonists"; speakers include Sergio Aragonés, Jim Borgman, Lynda Barry, Eldon Dedini, Lynn Johnston, Will Eisner, Ben Katchor, David Levine, Rick Kirkman, Patrick McDonnell, Lee Lorenz, Pat Oliphant, Trina Robbins, Roy Peterson, Jerry Scott, Jeff Smith, and Rebecca Zurier
- October 12–13: National Comic Book, Art, Toy, and Sci-Fi Expo III (St. Paul's Church Auditorium, New York City) — run as a charity event to benefit victims of the September 11 attacks
- October 19–21: Bat.con (Dallas, Texas) — celebrating the 35th Anniversary of the Batman TV show. Featured guests include: Mark Waid, Craig Rousseau, Dan Brereton, Norm Breyfogle, Adam West, Burt Ward, Yvonne Craig, Julie Newmar, Frank Gorshin, and Van Williams
- October 19–21: Great American Comic Book and Sci-Fi Expo (Hynes Convention Center, Boston, Massachusetts) — guests include Andy Kubert, Adam Kubert, Joe Kubert, Joe Quesada, Ed McGuinness, and David Wahl
- November 2–5; Coco Bulles (Culture Palace of Abidjan, Côte d'Ivoire)
- November 9–11: National Comic Book, Art, Toy, and Sci-Fi Expo IV (Metropolitan Pavilion, New York City) — featured guests include Klaus Janson and Joe Staton
- November 17–18: Motor City Comic Con II (Novi Expo Center, Novi, Michigan) — guests include Aaron Bordner, Peter David, Guy Davis, Marshall Dillon, Vince Locke, Jason Moore, Mark Schultz, William Stout, Randy Zimmerman, Chase Masterson, Vaughn Armstrong, Julie Caitlin Brown, Jeremy Bulloch, Angus McGinnis, Garek Hagon, and Kenneth Colley
- November 23–25: UnCommonCon 2001 (Wyndham Anatole Hotel, Dallas, Texas) — events cancelled due to sharp drop in domestic travel after 9/11 and slow dealer tables sales
- November 24–25: Mid-Ohio Con (Hilton Columbus Hotel at Easton Town Center, Columbus, Ohio) — guests include Dave Gibbons and John Byrne

== First issues by title ==
7 Seeds
Release: November by Shogakukan (Betsucomi). Author: Yumi Tamura.

Angel Cup
Release: by Tokyopop. Writer: Youn Jae-ho. Artist: Kim Dong-wook.

Fakta fra verden
Release: by Karstein Volle

Pearls Before Swine
Release: December 31 by The Washington Post. Writer: Stephan Pastis Artist: Stephan Pastis.

Sgt Mike Battle: The Greatest American Hero!
Release: August by Pier-C Comics. Writer & Artist: Graham Pierce.

The Surgeon
Release: by Rough Cut Comics

Trip to Tagaytay
Release: by Tala Comics Publishing. Writer & Artist: Arnold Arre.

== Initial appearances by character name ==
Onimar Synn in JSA #24 (June) written by David S. Goyer and Geoff Johns, published by DC Comics.
