= List of W.I.T.C.H. episodes =

The following is a list of episodes for the animated television series: W.I.T.C.H. Most of these episodes are based on the first two arcs of the W.I.T.C.H. comic books, The Twelve Portals and Nerissa's Revenge.

== Series overview ==
Series	Episodes	Originally released	
Series	Episodes	First released	Last released
1	26	18 December 2004	17 August 2005
2	26	5 June 2006	23 December 2006

== Episodes ==
=== Season 1 (2004–05) ===
- This season is loosely based on The Twelve Portals saga.
- Unlike the other four Guardians of the Veil, Will does not begin developing her very own elemental abilities until after the lowering of the Veil in season 2.

No.	Title	Written by	Storyboard by	Original release date	Prod. code	U.S. viewers (points/share) (Note: Ratings in parentheses represent same-day sister network broadcasts.)
1	"It Begins"	Andrew Nicholls and Darrell Vickers	Jean-Jacques Prunes and Christophe Villez	18 December 2004	101	N/A (Note: Ratings for the series premiere on ABC Kids on 18 December 2004 are not available. Additionally, ratings from ABC Family and Toon Disney for these episodes (from 19 December and later) are provided in a format that is not directly comparable to those for other episodes. When the two-part premiere was aired again on ABC Kids as part of the series proper on 15 January 2005, the episodes obtained a rating of 1.4/6.)
Will arrives at the town of Heatherfield. Her classmate Hay Lin invites her, Irma, Taranee and Cornelia to lunch, where her grandmother, Yan Lin, reveals to the girls their true powers, and passes to Will the mystical Heart of Kandrakar. Meanwhile, in Meridian, Caleb, the leader of the Rebellion against the evil Prince Phobos, is running for his life after a failed attempt at a storage raid. He leaps through a portal, interrupting the new Guardians' first training session. Overcome with fear, Will does not close the portal until one of Phobos' servants, Lord Cedric, drags Caleb through.: In the US, "It Begins" and "It Resumes" aired as a one-hour special to introduce the series' premiere, but internationally these two episodes aired separately.; The US special added opening narration, but removed two short scenes from the first half: Uriah getting splashed with water; and Irma yelling, "Keep all that noise down!"
2	"It Resumes"	Andrew Nicholls and Darrell Vickers	Jean-Jacques Prunes and Christophe Villez	18 December 2004	102	N/A
Irma, Taranee, Cornelia and Hay Lin must travel to Meridian after Will is captured by Cedric and Vathek. They cannot transform without Will, who dropped the Heart of Kandrakar in the struggle. The Heart leads them to find its keeper. The girls make their way through Meridian, finding Will's pit-like prison, where she is kept with Caleb and a smelly creature named Blunk. They throw the Heart down to Will and transform to escape the castle. A one-eyed Gargoyle ambushes them at the portal, pulling Irma back, but Will closes the portal on his hand. In the end, Hay Lin names the girls W.I.T.C.H. (the first letters of their names).
3	"The Key"	Andrew Nicholls and Darrell Vickers	Olivier Poirette and Isabelle Rifaux	29 January 2005	103	0.6/3 (0.7/3)
Caleb discovers that Blunk took the key he was supposed to leave behind in Meridian for Vathek, so the girls go back to Meridian to return the key. Cedric and Phobos discover that Vathek is a spy for the rebel army. They plant the key on General Raythor so that he, instead of Vathek, will be thrown into the Abyss of Shadows. In the B-story, Hay Lin decides to create some new clothes for Caleb to help him blend in on Earth.
4	"Happy Birthday Will"	Andrew Nicholls and Darrell Vickers	Thomas Astruc and Patrick Lambert	5 February 2005	104	1.1/4 (0.8/4)
It is Will's thirteenth birthday and she does not want a party. The girls manage to throw one anyway and everything is going well until Cedric shows up at City Hall looking for birth certificates for a certain teenage girl.The girls sneak away from the party and battle Cedric at City Hall. He flees, saying he has found what he needs. In the B-Story, Yan Lin gives her granddaughter a map of the portals.
5	"A Service to The Community"	Andrew Nicholls and Darrell Vickers	Miguel Gaban and Bruno Issaly	12 February 2005	105	N/A
While helping out on Community Service Day, Will and Hay Lin find strange Meridian graffiti which the Mage identifies as belonging to a beast living in Heatherfield in human form. Will suspects her History teacher, Professor Collins, who is dating her mom. The girls form a plan to force the suspected monster into revealing his true form. It turns out Collins is not the beast. They fly him back home, accidentally dropping him onto trampolines and into swimming pools on more than one occasion. In the B-story, Cornelia's little sister torments her, but Cornelia gets her back in the end.
6	"The Labyrinth"	Nancy Callaway and Trey Callaway	Jean-Charles Andre and Luc Blanchard	19 February 2005	106	1.0/4 (N/A)
The students at Sheffield Institute get their midterm results; everybody is happy with their grades except Taranee. Cedric's disguise as a bookseller attracts Cornelia, Elyon, Irma, Taranee, and Hay Lin to the store to look for history books and to admire Cedric. While in the bookstore, the W.I.T.C.H. girls inadvertently touch an inversion point and find themselves in the middle of a Labyrinth inside Phobos' castle. Blunk, who was in the store at the time, manages to get word to Will. Will and Caleb launch a rescue mission. Meanwhile, the others are smuggled out of the castle by a kitchen worker named Trill, who tells them about Phobos' sister. The Tracker, a hunter working for Phobos, arrives and chases the girls through the woods until Will shows up with the Heart. They quickly defeat the Tracker. In the B-story, Caleb starts work at the Silver Dragon restaurant.
7	"Divide and Conquer"	Andrew Nicholls and Darrell Vickers	Thomas Astruc and Patrick Lambert	26 February 2005	107	0.8/3 (0.6/3)
The W.I.T.C.H. girls and Elyon go on a school skiing trip to show up Sondra, a Swiss exchange student who seems to have mesmerized all the boys at Sheffield. Sondra steals Matt from Will, and the two girls compete in a one-on-one skiing competition. Will tries to cheat by skiing in her Guardian form (with a coat and hat to cover it up). Hay Lin flies above her and uses her powers to keep Will steady. Unknown to them, Phobos wants to take advantage of this trip to divide them and separate the other four Guardians from Will and the Heart of Kandrakar. The girls defeat the plan and find out that Sondra is not a Swiss exchange student at all, but an ordinary girl who tries to steal all the boys. The girls (and Elyon) are pleased when Sondra sprains her ankle. In the B-story, Caleb is trying to show the girls that he can have fun.
8	"Ambush At Torus Filney"	Andrew Nicholls and Darrell Vickers	Miguel Gaban and Olivier Poirette	5 March 2005	108	N/A
Phobos and Cedric start a rumor about the Seal of Phobos to trap Caleb with a sand monster called Sandpit. He tries to find out whether or not there is a spy in the castle. In the B-story, the W.I.T.C.H do a performance at the school, but after discovering Caleb is in danger, they create Astral Drop duplicates of themselves. After the real girls leave, the Astral Drops ruin the performance.
9	"Return of The Tracker"	Andy Guerdat and Steve Sullivan	Bruno Issaly and Laurent Jennet	12 March 2005	109	N/A
Prince Phobos sends the Tracker after Caleb in an effort to recapture the rebel leader. Meanwhile, the girls try to go see a movie starring their favorite actor. They struggle to save Caleb and still get to the show on time. In the B-story, Will and Hay Lin's parents won't let them go to the cinema; Will is grounded and Hay Lin's parents are overprotective.
10	"Framed"	Andy Guerdat and Steve Sullivan	Thomas Astruc and Patrick Lambert	19 March 2005	110	0.8/3 (0.9/4)
While trying to capture the feeling of the Middle Ages at the art museum for their school carnival, Will, Taranee, Cornelia, and Hay Lin get sucked into the painting they are studying. Unbeknownst to the girls, Phobos knows they are trapped and sends Frost the Hunter after them. The girls escape with the help of Elias Van Dahl, the imprisoned artist of the painting. Irma, Caleb and Blunk have to stall for time at the Medieval Carnival and figure out how to get the girls back to Heatherfield. Cedric and his goon platoon enter the painting to get the Heart of Kandrakar and Hay Lin paints furiously to get away. Irma and Caleb rescue the girls from the painting salvage the school carnival thanks to the number of people they brought back with them from the painting.
11	"The Stone of Threbe"	Bob Dolan Smith	Paul Benetteau and Olivier Güss Thulliez	2 April 2005	111	N/A
Phobos has finally found an indisputable way to find his long lost sister: the Star of Threbe. The Silver Dragon, Hay Lin's family's restaurant in Heatherfield, is threatened when Blunk stinks up the joint with his new home: a garbage dumpster. While the girls try to give Blunk a bath, Cedric places the Star in his window shop and Elyon walks in and takes it. Now when the girls try to change back, they find themselves stuck in Guardian form and powerless. Not knowing what to do, the girls race back to the Silver Dragon to enlist Yan Lin and Caleb's assistance. In the meantime, Cedric sends a monster plant to Earth to tie up the Guardians while he makes contact with the Princess. The girls are forced to fight without their powers until the Princess returns the Star to Cedric, and the girls regain their powers. Phobos and Cedric have who they're looking for; she just doesn't know it yet.
12	"The Princess Revealed"	Andrew Nicholls and Darrell Vickers	Luc Blanchard and Miguel Gaban	16 April 2005	112	N/A
Elyon is unknowingly Phobos's sister and the true heir to the throne of Meridian. Vathek overhears Phobos and Cedric's plans to capture her and hurries to tell Caleb. He ends up running for his life when Cedric comes to stop him. Vathek and Blunk escape to Earth with Cedric and a Larvek hot on their heels. Vathek relates the news to Caleb, who tells the Guardians. They go after Elyon to keep her safe from Cedric's clutches. They have to stop Larvek from eating Vathek. Elyon slips off in a bad mood after her new boyfriend dumps her. She heads back to her place of comfort: Cedric's bookshop.
13	"Stop the Presses"	Lisa Rosenthal	Bruno Issaly and Laurent Jennet	23 April 2005	113	N/A
Phobos is preparing the Ritual of Amalgamation. He needs symbols of Elyon's body, mind, and spirit. Cedric takes her hairbrush, and A+ math test, and tries to take her breath. Meanwhile, Martin Tubbs catches a glimpse of a Hermeneuta beast from Meridian. The only thing that will get him away long enough for the girls to send it back home is a date with Irma. Catching the little beast is not easy, especially when the mom shows up. Cedric finally captures Elyon's breath in a balloon and all that's left is to take her to Meridian. In the B-story, Irma is angry when she finds out she must work on the newspaper with Martin. Blunk is assigned to keep an eye on Elyon.
14	"Parent's Night"	Lisa Rosenthal	Thomas Astruc and Patrick Lambert	30 April 2005	114	N/A
It's parents' night at the school, and Hay Lin is very excited, but not Elyon. She feels that Cedric is the only one who understands her, not her friends, and especially not her family. When Elyon does family tree research for school, her parents do not have any pictures of her other relatives. Elyon thinks that it is because they do not care about her. Cedric reveals to Elyon that her "parents" are beasts, and that she is the Princess of Meridian. Elyon is confused but goes to Meridian, her original home.
15	"The Mudslugs"	Amanda Rudolph Schwartz and Julie Dufine	Luc Blanchard and Miguel Gaban	7 May 2005	115	N/A
Elyon adjusts to her new life as the Princess of Meridian living in Phobos' castle, although she is still under the illusion that Phobos has created. Meanwhile, Cornelia gets upset about losing Elyon to Cedric and Phobos and she quits being the Earth Guardian. Phobos uses this to his advantage to pull a 'divide and conquer' move on Will, Irma, Taranee and Hay Lin. Phobos sends the mudslugs to go after Will, Irma, Taranee, Hay Lin, Caleb, and Blunk. Without Cornelia, the girls are powerless to defeat the mudslugs and their mother. Thanks to radio, Cornelia returns to being the Earth Guardian and defeats the mudslugs.
16	"Walk This Way"	Andy Guerdat and Steve Sullivan	Thomas Astruc and Patrick Lambert	6 June 2005	116	N/A
Caleb discovers that fellow rebels have been turned into zombified Trance Marchers by the sound of a magical object called the Horn of Hypnos. Thanks to the Horn, Phobos and Cedric now use the rebels as a workforce. Blunk steals the Horn and brings it back to Earth, and the trance spreads to Heatherfield. The Guardians are called in to help save the Horn's victims on School Dance night. Only a specific melody can break the spell, but how long will Will, Irma, Taranee, Cornelia and Hay Lin be able to resist the entrancing sound of the Horn of Hypnos? Hay Lin gets turned into a Trance Marcher. The only way they can get her to stop slamming them into a wall is to pull the plug on her power. In the B-story, Will is happy when she finds out that she will go to School Dance night with Matt. Note: This episode was produced before "Ghosts of Elyon" was, but was originally aired (out of order) before "The Underwater Mines." This list reflects the European DVD releases.
17	"Ghosts of Elyon"	Andy Guerdat and Steve Sullivan	Bruno Issaly and Laurent Jennet	20 May 2005	117	N/A
Will and the rest of the girls try to tell Elyon the truth about Phobos and Meridian, but that becomes very hard when Phobos teaches his sister to make ghostly images of herself to confuse her former friends and the rebels. The real Elyon is upset that she didn't bring her sketchbook from Earth, so Phobos sends Lurdens through a portal to her old bedroom to fetch it. The creatures also trash a stash of chocolate, and Blunk is able to use the scent to track them to Phobos's and Elyon's secret Meridian mountain hideout. The Guardians and Caleb search for Elyon under the mountain but are ambushed by Lurdens. Forced into the open, they battle Cedric on the mountainside before returning to Earth, no closer to warning Elyon of the terrible danger. In the B-story, Will needs some privacy. In order to save Elyon, the girls trick their parents into thinking they are having a sleepover party, but Will is grounded for having a mess in her room.
18	"The Mogriffs"	Jaime Becker	Luc Blanchard and Miguel Gaban	23 May 2005	118	N/A
Phobos sends shapeshifting monsters into Meridian to pose as and discredit the Guardians so Elyon will lose what little trust she has left in her friends. While the real Guardians do battle with the evil twins, Cornelia and Caleb try to persuade Elyon that Phobos is not as good as she believes, but she will not listen. Caleb does something to shake Elyon's faith in her new brother: he bows to her. Unnerved by this, Elyon is starting to suspect that Phobos is not telling her everything. Caleb takes the Book of Secrets and there are the plans for Elyon.
19	"The Underwater Mines"	Bob Dolan Smith	Franck Leguay and Olivier Güss Thulliez	13 June 2005	119	N/A
Phobos uses the knowledge that Caleb's father is alive to lure Caleb and the Guardians to the Underwater Mines for an ambush. Hay Lin hears the guards whispering, which allows the group's unimpeded access to the mines. The element of surprise is soon lost and the group is on the move. Cedric floods the mine and sends the group and Caleb's father Julian on a mine cart ride to the main shaft. Once there, they use the guardroom to float to the surface and come face-to-face with Cedric and a platoon of guards. Cedric tries to go after Caleb and the miners stranded in the remains of the guardroom, but Irma and Hay Lin freeze Cedric with a flash-frozen bubble. Phobos sits in his castle, thinking he has taken care of the major thorns in his side, until the girls show up with the last laugh in his scrying pool. In the B-story, W.I.T.C.H, Caleb, and Blunk try to open the Book of Secrets.
20	"The Seal of Phobos"	Andy Guerdat and Steve Sullivan	Thomas Astruc and Patrick Lambert	20 June 2005	120	N/A
The Seal has been lost ever since the mysterious woman who rescued Elyon as a baby used it to create a portal and escape. While hiding from Lurdens in the sewers, Blunk finds an amulet to add to his junk collection, which turns out to be the Seal of Phobos. Unknowingly, he creates many portals while strolling around Heatherfield. Meanwhile W.I.T.C.H. are at a rollerskating race. They find the portals when Irma crashes uncontrollably through bushes. Back in Meridian, Caleb is trying to evade a search party, but is trapped when all the portals created by Blunk are closed by the Heart of Kandrakar. Cedric is gaining on him. When the girls find Blunk, unforeseen circumstances lead to the merging of the two magical items. W.I.T.C.H. uses the Heart's new ability to open portals to save Caleb. Will then uses the Heart and the Seal of Phobos to open the Book of Secrets, and everybody finds out Phobos' plan.
21	"Escape from Cavigor"	Nancy Callaway and Trey Callaway	Luc Blanchard and Bruno Issaly	27 June 2005	121	N/A
Caleb learns that Elyon's adoptive parents, the Browns, are being held in the forbidding underground prison at Cavigor. He and the Guardians plot a difficult escape: while a distraction from above draws guards upwards, Cornelia will tunnel in from the Infinite City below. But one slip and Phobos will discover the rebels' secret subterranean hideout.
22	"Caleb's Challenge"	Steve Billnitzer	Laurent Jennet and Franck Leguay	11 July 2005	122	N/A
When Caleb's best friend Aldarn accidentally becomes hypnotized by Elyon and agrees to sign a peace treaty, Caleb has to fight him for the position of leader. Meanwhile, after leaving their baking duties for the school bake sale to Blunk, the Guardians enter a trap filled with Larveks and they must defeat them before the rebels get eaten.
23	"The Battle of the Meridian Plains"	Andrew Nicholls and Darrell Vickers	Miguel Gaban and Patrick Lambert	25 July 2005	123	N/A
Cedric blocks the village's water source in the hopes that thirsty Meridianites will break down and reveal the location of the rebels secret hideout. There is fresh water in a nearby lake inhabited by an elusive creature called the Kaithim, which the Guardians have to battle. Cedric discovers the entrance to the Infinite City just before Vathek is able to seal his comrades inside. Aldarn, separated from Caleb and with limited food before the City is inevitably overtaken, makes a tactical decision to charge the Castle. Caleb and the Guardians join the premature attack but the uprising fails when Elyon uses her intense power. Many rebels, including Aldarn and Caleb's father, are thrown in Phobos' dungeons. In the B-story, Hay Lin has recurring nightmares about being Elyon and trapped on a throne.
24	"The Rebel Rescue"	Ursula Zeigler and Michele Gendelman	Luc Blanchard and Bruno Issaly	1 August 2005	124	N/A
Caleb makes plans for the escape of the rebels captured by Phobos in the abortive battle of the Meridian Plains. With Blunk's help, Caleb tries to map the tunnel system to the castle's dungeon, but the reconnaissance mission goes wrong and Blunk is left behind on Meridian. Looking for the Passling, Caleb and the Guardians find and save a Castle Guard wounded in battle and left for dead by Cedric. When the Guard, Tynar, sees Earth and the girls' concern for his recovery, he switches loyalties and promises to guide them through the complex subterranean passageways into the dungeons where the rebels from the uprising are being held. The daring raid frees the rebels, and Tynar begins spreading the word among Phobos's guards that the other side of the Veil is not as they have been told. Back in Heatherfield, Will impulsively kisses Matt, who has offered her a pet dormouse named Mister Huggles earlier in the episode, but gave it to Irma because of her mother.
25	"The Stolen Heart"	Andrew Nicholls and Darrell Vickers	Gilles Cazeaux and Marc Crévisy	8 August 2005	125	N/A
In Meridian, the Infinite City occupied by Phobos' guards leaves a thousand rebels with nowhere to hide while Elyon, though shaken by the sight of monstrous Lurdens working in her castle, is still unaware of what is being planned for her coronation. Caleb and the Guardians have to get close enough to warn her, but they can't do it without the Heart of Kandrakar, which has been stolen by Jeek, an evil Passling who has put the blame on Blunk. Matt accidentally follows Caleb and the girls through a portal. Matt discovers Will, Irma, Taranee, Cornelia, and Hay Lin's secret.
26	"The Final Battle"	Andrew Nicholls and Darrell Vickers	Marc Crévisy and Franck Leguay	17 August 2005	126	N/A
In Meridian, Elyon is at the full potential of her powers and excitedly prepares for tomorrow's coronation. Phobos and Cedric talk out of her earshot: The coronation was changed to today; Phobos will drain Elyon's powers. Meanwhile in Heatherfield, Caleb has finally figured out with the Guardians' help a way to get his men across the Meridian Plains unseen. He immediately commences the attack after Cornelia senses that Elyon is in danger. Phobos reveals his true evil self to Elyon, which greatly shocks and scares her. He ties her to the throne to absorb her powers. But the Guardians, the rebels, Matt, Blunk and some guards of Phobos converted by Tynar begin the invasion. The Guardians and Caleb's troops have the advantage until Phobos, who manages to steal some of Elyon's powers, comes and turns the tables on them. Just before he can take the Heart of Kandrakar from Will, Elyon (rescued by Cornelia) arrives and turns the tide of the battle. With Elyon's help, Phobos is finally defeated and imprisoned along with Cedric and all of his monster minions in the Mage's chamber in the Infinite City. The Guards are forgiven and Elyon becomes the new ruler of Meridian. In the B-story, Irma gives Mr. Huggles to Hay Lin.

=== Season 2 (2006) ===
- This season is loosely based on the Nerissa's Revenge saga.
- Episodes are titled by letters of the alphabet.
- This season is titled Dimension W.I.T.C.H. in French.
- Will finally develops her own elemental power of quintessence, in addition to being Keeper of the mystical Heart of Kandrakar.

No. overall	No. in season	Title	Written by	Storyboard by	Original release date	Prod. code	U.S. viewers (points/share)
27	1	"A is for Anonymous"	Greg Weisman	Bruno Issaly and Franck Leguay	5 June 2006	201	N/A
While everyone is celebrating Phobos's defeat, a kitchen worker named Trill gives the newly crowned Queen Elyon a jewel what belonged to her mother, Queen Weira. Caleb reveals to Cornelia his intentions to stay in Meridian and serve Elyon. Taranee starts thinking she will turn into an "invisible girl" again, and begins to act up at school. The Guardians are faced with an old enemy Frost the Hunter who followed them to Earth. Frost kidnaps Irma, Cornelia, and Hay Lin and threatens Taranee to bring Will to him without Heart of Kandrakar. In a subplot, a new foe called Nerissa appears. She frees Miranda (who opts not to free Phobos), frees Gargoyle and replaces his lost left hand with a club, helps the Tracker and Sniffer avoid the rebels, restores Sandpit while giving it a humanoid form, and meets up with Raythor at the Abyss of Shadows. Nerissa and the others meet Frost and Crimson. Now the enemies who Nerissa released are called the Knights of Vengeance.
28	2	"B is for Betrayal"	Cary Bates	Laurent Delion and Serge Tanguy	16 June 2006	202	N/A
The Knights of Vengeance attack Meridian and begin targeting those who betrayed their former master. The Guardians are called to another realm, Kandrakar, and learn of their new status as the Guardians of the Infinite Dimensions, after the Veil's lifting. In the subplot, Cornelia and Caleb are having relationship problems. The girls also notice a sudden change in Cornelia's powers, and Cornelia develops a crush on Taranee's older brother Peter.
29	3	"C is for Changes"	Nicole Dubuc	Laurent Jennet and Thierry Martin	19 June 2006	203	N/A
The Guardians are taken by surprise by their new powers: Will can bring electrical appliances to life, Irma now can use mind control, Taranee now can use telepathy, Cornelia now can use telekinesis, and Hay Lin can become invisible. The Knights devise a plan to blackmail the Guardians using Elyon's disappearance to make Earth authorities and their parents suspicious of their recent activities. After things are cleared up, Elyon decides to finish the rest school year, Caleb accompanying her. Meanwhile, Will is grounded because her poor grades and her mother sets her to transfer schools.
30	4	"D is for Dangerous"	Andrew Robinson	David Encinas, Jérôme Lohez, Marc Perret, Stéphane Sichère	26 June 2006	204	N/A
W.I.T.C.H.'s new foe Nerissa creates beings known as Annihilators and sends them on a rampage in Meridian while Elyon is on Earth. Will defeats the Annihilators with an unknown lightning-based power she is gradually developing, in addition to bringing electrical devices to life. While Matt convinces Caleb to train him to become more useful to the group, Mr. Huggles escapes from his cage and creates chaos in the Lins' restaurant. Hay Lin gives Mr. Huggles to Taranee, but Taranee's father has an allergy to fur. Taranee then passes Mr. Huggles to Cornelia, but Cornelia's sister Lilian frees Mr. Huggles to meet her cat Napoleon, and more chaos ensues. Cornelia finally gives Mr. Huggles to Elyon, but Mr. Huggles escapes again and returns to Matt where he stays permanently.
31	5	"E is for Enemy"	Samuel Bernstein	Bruno Issaly and Franck Leguay	14 July 2006	205	N/A
While the girls are experiencing frighteningly realistic dreams, a new dilemma appears: Will's mother's plan to be transferred from Heatherfield so she and Will can start over someplace else. As the girls stake out in Susan's office building to destroy the transfer request, the girls fall asleep. While asleep, some of them fall asleep next to one another and experience the same dream. Taranee determines that the dreams are the result of someone's interference, and all sleep next to one another to fight in the dream together. The girls find out Nerissa is to blame and defeat her while in the dream. The girls then convince Will's mother to keep Will in Heatherfield.
32	6	"F is for Facades"	Jon Weisman	Kissler and Frédéric Vervisch	17 July 2006	206	N/A
Disappointed at Caleb because of his decision to stay on Meridian, Cornelia goes on a date with Taranee's older brother Peter, disguised as her sister Lilian. The other girls follow, Elyon, Caleb and Lilian included. Meanwhile, Caleb swallows his pride and tries to ice-skate for Cornelia despite his lack of skills. Only they are interrupted when a distress call is heard from Meridian: The Knights of Vengeance have captured Drake, Aldarn, and his father, Julian. After the team arrives at Meridian, Caleb and Blunk are captured. W.I.T.C.H. arrives to save them, and momentarily the girls believe Caleb and Julian to be gone. After realizing how upset she was without Caleb, Cornelia decides to break up with Peter and return to Caleb. During this episode, Cornelia reveals her power of being tall and Irma reveals her new ability of changing the colors of clothing.
33	7	"G is for Garbage"	Kevin Hopps	Laurent Jennet and Serge Tanguy	24 July 2006	207	N/A
Blunk finds the re-emergent Horn of Hypnos, but it gets stolen by Jeek. Irma leaves for Meridian along with Matt and Blunk. The three track Jeek's hiding spot, only to find out that the Knights of Vengeance took the horn. Irma has to work with Blunk to save her friends, as they find out Matt and the other Guardians have been turned into Trance Marchers. When Will blows the horn at Irma and Blunk, they fake being hypnotized to get close enough to the horn to destroy it. Irma is mad at Blunk for covering her garage in garbage. She is grounded and forced by her father to clean up.
34	8	"H is for Hunted"	Steve Peterman and Gary Dontzig	Jérémie Perin and Alexandre Ristorcelli	31 July 2006	208	N/A
Will creates an Astral Drop of herself so she can get her chores done. Nerissa then turns it into an Altermere, an exact duplicate of Will, including her feelings, memories, and powers. While Will is trying to find it, Nerissa convinces it to take Will's place, and a battle erupts. The other girls try to help, but they can't tell which Will is real. The Altermere becomes good and is almost destroyed by Nerissa but Will absorbs it into herself in order to let its feelings, memories and emotions "live inside Will's mind." In a second storyline, Will is forced by her mother to do laundry.
35	9	"I is for Illusion"	Cary Bates	Laurent Delion and Thierry Martin	9 August 2006	209	N/A
The girls go on a vacation with Irma's family. They are having a rough time adjusting to living in a cramped space, but they manage to cope until the girls begin acting negatively to one another. At one point they get into a dangerous situation that results in an all out argument. The Oracle then appears to them, asking to claim back the Heart because of distrust and absence of harmony amongst the girls. Only Hay Lin sees the shadow of Nerissa cast by the Oracle, and the girls know there is something wrong. A battle ensues, and Caleb and Blunk return from Meridian in time to help out and victory goes to the Guardians. The girls then apologize to one another and stop arguing. In a subplot, Caleb and Blunk are fighting against the other Knights of Vengeance.
36	10	"J is for Jewel"	Samuel Bernstein	Bruno Issaly and Frédéric Vervisch	14 August 2006	210	N/A
The Guardians are divided, each of them on family vacations, but Hay Lin is the only one left at Heatherfield. The Knights of Vengeance attack Phobos's prison and manage to free their prince, and it is up to the Air Guardian to gather the girls so they can fight back. Meanwhile, Elyon wishes to know about her parents, and after giving her lies about them, Trill reveals herself to be Nerissa, and traps Elyon inside the jewel from Queen Weira's crown she'd given her earlier, stealing her powers and kidnapping Elyon. In the subplot, Hay Lin meets and falls head-over-heels for a boy named Eric.
37	11	"K is for Knowledge"	Nicole Dubuc	Laurent Jennet and Christophe Malcombe	21 August 2006	211	N/A
W.I.T.C.H. gains new knowledge of their sorceress foe Nerissa, a former Guardian and one-time holder of the Heart of Kandrakar. Will discovers that her own elemental ability to generate white-blue lightning and bring electrical appliances to life is Quintesence, which contains the very essence of life itself within lightning. In the subplot, after Taranee's mother forbids her from seeing Nigel, Taranee decides to turn herself into a bad girl to rebel.
38	12	"L is for Loser"	Andrew Robinson	Thierry Martin and Serge Tanguy	27 August 2006	212	N/A
Nerissa kidnaps Matt and Mister Huggles and adds them to her Knights of Destruction, transforming them into Shagon and Khor. Meanwhile, Irma is faced with losing the friendship of her classmate, Martin. The radio station K-SHIP goes to Sheffield Institute. Members of the K-SHIP team are Irma, Martin, Uriah, Bess, and Courtney Grumper.
39	13	"M is for Mercy"	Jon Weisman	Franck Leguay and Jérémie Perin	9 September 2006	213	N/A
Shagon returns to Heatherfield as his old self, Matt, and keeps W.I.T.C.H. distracted while Nerissa corrupts Cassidy into joining her. Will stops being angry about her mother and teacher's relationship. Note: In the UK version and many of the international dubs, the train yard scene was partially censored. However, the US version of the episode retained the full scene, and it is uncensored in English on the European DVD releases.
40	14	"N is for Narcissist"	Nicole Dubuc	Bruno Issaly and Laurent Jennet	16 September 2006	214	N/A
The Knights of Destruction attack the Fortress of Infinity, while Nerissa, posing as the Mage, corrupts Halinor, the former Guardian of Fire. By accident, Cornelia receives the power of a Quinto Guardian, possessing all five elements, and Nerissa tries to use this to her advantage. W.I.T.C.H. must clean the cars and Will is reunited with her father.
41	15	"O is for Obedience"	Samuel Bernstein	Laurent Delion and Thierry Martin	23 September 2006	215	N/A
While Irma is trying to organize a concert for hit singer Vance Michael Justin, Caleb learns that Nerissa is his mother and confronts her in her hideaway at Mount Thanos. The girls struggle with Irma, who is giving them many orders to help organize a concert.
42	16	"P is for Protectors"	Cary Bates	Franck Leguay and Serge Tanguy	30 September 2006	216	0.2/1
Nerissa and her Knights of Destruction attack Zamballa, a world of purple foliage with a populace of moving trees, disguised as the Guardians. When W.I.T.C.H. arrives to stop them, they are forced to fend off the Zamballians and their leader, Queen Kadma, the former Guardian of Earth. Taranee starts to be angry about her mother.
43	17	"Q is for Quarry"	Jon Weisman	Laurent Jennet and Jérémie Perin	7 October 2006	217	0.2/1
W.I.T.C.H. pursues Nerissa and her Knights on Zamballa. They unknowingly falling in her trap, and lose Kadma and the Heart of Zamballa in the process. Will meets her father's girlfriend, Sarina Sanchez, and thinks she is Nerissa in disguise. Will hires Blunk to spy on Sarina.
44	18	"R is for Relentless"	Kevin Hopps	Bruno Issaly and Patrick Lambert	14 October 2006	218	0.4/2
The girls try to protect Yan Lin, the last remaining former Guardian, from falling under Nerissa's control. Hay Lin and her grandma move from one dimension to another, trying to flee from the Knights of Destruction and Nerissa. Hay Lin has bad luck when her Fortune cookies haven't got fortunes in them.
45	19	"S is for Self"	Jon Weisman	Franck Leguay and Thierry Martin	21 October 2006	219	0.1/1
Shagon manages to trick Will and makes her believe a lie. Nerissa deprives her Knights of their power to empower the old Guardians. Matt is free from Shagon and gains control. Nerissa traps Yan Lin inside her seal and decides to create an Altermere. K-SHIP decides to organize a battle of the bands.
46	20	"T is for Trauma"	Samuel Bernstein	Laurent Jennet and Serge Tanguy	4 November 2006	220	0.5/2
Nerissa appears disguised as a student at Sheffield, but is soon uncovered and a battle ensues. The girls win by switching their enemies, knowing that element against element will only make them lose as the former Guardians have stronger powers and are more experienced. Hay Lin begins to wear braces on her teeth.
47	21	"U is for Undivided"	Cary Bates	Bruno Issaly and Patrick Lambert	11 November 2006	221	0.5/2
Lilian is revealed as the Heart of Earth, its source of magic, and the Guardians have to protect her. Cornelia attempts to gain her sister's trust. At Cornelia's insistence, Lilian empowers Matt, Mr. Huggles, and Napoleon as her regents, allowing them to wield portions of her power. Matt and Huggles gain the ability to transform into Shagon and Khor while retaining their minds, and Napoleon gains the ability to assume a humanoid form. Cornelia is forced to babysit her sister while her parents are out for the night.
48	22	"V is for Victory"	Nicole Dubuc	Laurent Jennet and Thierry Martin	18 November 2006	222	0.6/2
Will makes a deal with Prince Phobos, since only the heir to the Meridian throne can claim its Heart. Seeing as it has become part of Nerissa's power source, in exchange for freedom he is obliged to return the Heart. Will is having a rampage on Mandy at the swimming competition.
49	23	"W is for Witch"	Nicole Dubuc	Grégory Panaccione and Stéphane Sichère	28 October 2006	223	0.2/1
Phobos convinces the Guardians to release Cedric and Miranda for more protection. Meanwhile, as it is Halloween, the one night in the year when a Heart can be taken by force, the Guardians have to protect Napoleon, as he is Lilian's familiar. The race is on to keep Napoleon away from Nerissa, and the girls are able to walk around in Guardian form because of the holiday. Phobos tricks Nerissa and assumes control over her Seal. Meanwhile, Irma is forced to take her brother Chris, Lilian, and Blunk trick-or-treating, only to discover that her crush Andrew Hornby likes to trick-or-treat too. Irma gives Chris and Lilian a crash-course in how to get the most candy, using her own powers to help. Note: This episode was aired before "T is for Trauma", "U is for Undivided" and "V is for Victory" on the weekend before Halloween 2006.
50	24	"X is for Xanadu"	Andrew Robinson	Franck Leguay and Serge Tanguy	9 December 2006	224	0.3/1
Phobos returns to Meridian and begins conquering it with his new powers. While the Guardians are trying to stop him, Hay Lin has to complete an art project on Xanadu, her vision of paradise. Meanwhile, she has also lied to her parents that Yan Lin left for a vacation in China to see distant relatives.
51	25	"Y is for Yield"	Samuel Bernstein	Laurent Jennet and Thierry Martin	16 December 2006	225	0.3/1
Final exams coincide with a test of cosmic strength, as the Guardians hold the future of the Universe in their hands. C.H.Y.K.N, Elyon and Yan Lin Altermere, who are trapped on the scepter of Phobos, attempt to contact Taranee to inform the Guardians that Caleb and Blunk are in danger. Will reveals her secret plot to defeat Phobos to everyone, including the recruitment of some of their former enemies to their side. Only just as things are looking up, a large twist interrupts things.
52	26	"Z is for Zenith"	Greg Weisman	Grégory Panaccione and Franck Leguay	23 December 2006	226	N/A
After Cedric swallowed Phobos, thus gaining the power of Nerissa's seal, he decides with Miranda to seek revenge on everybody. Cedric attacks Heatherfield and orders Miranda to destroy the Aurameres, granting her enough power to do so. W.I.T.C.H. and Matt leave for Earth. Regents of Earth enchant Heatherfield to prevent anyone from seeing Cedric or W.I.T.C.H. during the fight. C.H.Y.K.N., Elyon and Yan Lin's Altermere intervene and help W.I.T.C.H. to tap into their true powers. The girls each reach the zenith of their power, but lose their humanity in turn. With Cedric defeated, C.H.Y.K.N., Elyon and Yan Lin's Altermere escape, except Nerissa who becomes trapped in her own dream. Through the efforts of their friends, W.I.T.C.H. are able to get their humanity brought back. Elyon regains control of Meridian and returns to her throne. After the events, W.I.T.C.H. meets the computer teacher Pr. Raphael Sylla. Note: In the comic series, Sylla is an Interpol agent, who is a hired mercenary planning to find out the truth of the Guardians and expose their abilities.
