= W.I.T.C.H. (video game) =

2005 video game

W.i.t.c.h.
- Developer(s): Climax
- Publisher(s): Buena Vista Games
- Director(s): Chris Keegan; James Brace
- Producer(s): Gareth Noye; Ashley Panell
- Designer(s): Pete Maurice; Jake May
- Programmer(s): Sam Scott
- Artist(s): Paul Mitchell
- Composer(s): Matt Simmonds
- Series: W.I.T.C.H.
- Platform(s): Game Boy Advance
- Release: EU: October 7, 2005
- Genre(s): Action, platform
- Mode(s): Single-player

W.I.T.C.H. is a platform game for the Game Boy Advance. It was developed by Climax Studios and released in Europe on 7 October 2005 by Buena Vista Games. The game was not released outside of Europe.

Although the box art resembles the look of the characters in the comic book, the game's storyline and graphics are based on season 1 of the animated television series adaptation of the same name.

== Plot ==
The game starts with Hay Lin, one of the five main protagonists, having a vision. The W.I.T.C.H. Guardians Will, Irma, Taranee, Cornelia, and Hay Lin embark on a mission to defeat the series' antagonist, Prince Phobos.

== Gameplay ==
The game is divided into chapters, in which there are stages. Each Guardian has the ability to fly as well as two unique elemental powers. Players are able to switch between the Guardians at any time (Will is the default guardian). Players can also combine the powers of any two guardians except Will to destroy all enemies on screen. However, using elemental powers and flying drains energy from the Heart of Kandrakar meter displayed at the top of the screen, above the health meter. Likewise, when characters endure damage bars from the health meter are lost. Caleb is also playable in more action-oriented levels. He can use a sword and longbow. Blunk is a non-player character who trades useful items for something he wants. Needed items can be stored in the inventory. The game has 20 levels in total. After beating the game, the player unlocks Kandrakar Mode, which allows each Guardian to use her abilities without drawing power from the Power Meter and gives Caleb unlimited arrows.

== Development and Release ==
The game was announced in August 2005.

== Reception ==
Nintendo-x2.com gave it a rating of 6.5. French game review website Jeuxvideo.com gave it 8/20.
