= Dark Dimension =

The Dark Dimension may refer to:

- "The Dark Dimension", an unmade Doctor Who special to celebrate the series' 30th anniversary
- Dark Dimension, home of Dormammu in the Marvel Comics universe
- Part I, issue 3 of the W.I.T.C.H. comic book series
