= Coco Bulles =

Ivorian cartoon and comics festival

Coco Bulles is the International Festival of Cartoons and Comics of Abidjan. The aim is to give a panoramic view of the comic literature and graphics in Africa.

The festival contains art exhibitions, workshops, conferences and roundtables. The venue for the festival was the Culture Palace of Abidjan, Côte d'Ivoire.

== Past festivals ==
- 2001: The first Coco Bulles Festival is held 2–5 November 2001.

The motto of the festival was: "Long live the comic!". Some artists who participated the festival in 2001 were: Tristan Demers (the creator of 'Gargouille', one of the most popular characters in Quebec comics) and Bernard Willem Holtrop (one of the most controversial cartoonists in Europe)

- 2003: The second Coco Bulles Festival is held between 6–9 November 2003.

Switzerland was chosen as the guest of honour. The festival is organized by Olvis Dabley and cartoonists Zohoré Lassane , Illary Simplice and Mendozza Y Caramba .
Some artists who participated the festival in 2003 were: Jean-Claude Fournier who handled Spirou et Fantasio in the years 1969-1979, Claude Moliterni organizer of Angoulême International Comics Festival, Christophe Bertschy who created 'Nelson', a newspaper strip which appears in Le Matin and in the german newspaper Bieler Tagblatt.

- 2007: The third Coco Bulles Festival is held between 12 and 15 April 2007

Belgium was chosen as the guest of honour. Some artists who participated the festival in 2007 were: Peter Kroll , Cécile Bertrand and Daniel Henrotin Dany (comics).
The theme was; "Comics and satirical, traces of time in search of balance".
Some artists who participated the festival in 2003 were Peter Kroll and Cécile Bertrand.

- The fourth Coco Bulles was originally scheduled in November 2009 but was postponed indefinitely.
