= Angel Cup =

South Korean manhwa

- Cover of the Tokyopop edition of Angel Cup vol. 1 (2006), art by Dong-wook Kim

엔젤컵 RR: Enjel keop MR: Enjel k'ŏp
- Genre: Action, Sports, Comedy-drama
- Author: Jae-ho Youn
- Illustrator: Dong-wook Kim
- Publisher: (South Korea) Daiwon C.I.
- English publisher: (Canada) (United States) Tokyopop (Australia) (New Zealand) Madman Entertainment
- Original run: 2001
- Volumes: 5

Angel Cup (Korean: 엔젤컵) is a manhwa about girls' soccer in the Republic of Korea. The writer is Jae-ho Youn (윤재호), and the artist is Dong-wook Kim (김동욱).

The series was translated into English by Tokyopop; the Tokyopop version of the manhwa is out of print as of August 31, 2009.

== Plot ==
Angel Cup is a story about the formation of a High School Girls' Soccer League in the Republic of Korea. It centers around two female players in particular; So-jin Lee and Shin-bee. For So-jin, she has given up on soccer years ago, after losing to her former rival, Shin-bee. But, when she transfers to Han Shin High School, So-jin challenges the boys' varsity team to soccer matches, when Shin-bee has been appointed manager of the Han Shin High boys' varsity team. However for So-jin, there was no girls' soccer league in Han Shin High. Or what’s worse, So-jin was literally insulted from derogatory remarks by the boys' team. So, So-jin decided to form a girls' varsity team, in order to get back at them for what they said and did. Now, through hard work and strong determination, So-jin Lee and her team, The Han Shin High Blue Angels struggle throughout soccer matches, and their everyday lives.
