= Fakta fra verden =

Norwegian comic strip

Fakta fra verden (Norwegian for "Facts from the world") is a Norwegian comic strip written and drawn by Karstein Volle, since 2001.

The comic has an educational theme and each episode is written and drawn like an educational message. However, the facts that the strip claims to present are always completely absurd.
