= Xylor Jane =

American artist (born 1963)

- Born: 1964 (age 61–62); U.S.
- Education: San Francisco Art Institute
- Occupations: Artist, painter

Xylor Jane (born 1963) is an American visual artist and painter. Her work is labor intensive and made up of dots, set to a mathematical sequence. Often the paintings are made of bright colors. She has lived and worked in Greenfield, Massachusetts; Brooklyn, New York City; and San Francisco, California.

== Life and work ==
Jane received a BFA degree in painting from the San Francisco Art Institute in 1993.

Her paintings integrate concepts of mathematics by starting a painting with a number and incorporating sequencing, the paintings have a strong use of color, and they reflect time and space with the level of detail. Jane's color is rarely brushed, and rather is applied "in single, unmodulated dots, sometimes as tiny as a millimeter in diameter." Jane has worked extensively with prime numbers and the Fibonacci sequence in her art. She is also known to be highly influenced by the weather, working "according to weather conditions, revisiting one painting, for instance, only on overcast days, and another when it's sunny out: hence, some works take years to produce."

Jane's painting was featured in the Bay Area Now show at the Yerba Buena Center for the Arts in 2005. Other Bay Area institutions where she has had solo or two-person shows include the Jack Hanley Gallery, Gallery 16, the LAB, and the Luggage Store Gallery. Jane had a 2010 solo show at Almine Rech in Paris, France and a 2005 solo show at Four Gallery in Dublin, Ireland.

== Exhibitions ==
Jane's exhibitions include:

- 2004 – Xylor Jane and Jeff Kao: Blue Max, The Lab, San Francisco, California
- December 11, 2004 – January 1, 2005 – Xylor Jane, Robin Peck and Luke Murphy, CANADA Gallery, New York City, New York
- October 11 – November 6, 2006 – Xylor Jane: Dying Everyday, CANADA Gallery, New York City, New York
- February 26 – March 29, 2009 – Xylor Jane: N.D.E., CANADA Gallery, New York City, New York
- May 6 – June 3, 2012 – Xylor Jane: Xylor Jane, 3:07 AM, CANADA Gallery, New York City, New York
- May 9 – June 7, 2015 – Xylor Jane: trice, CANADA Gallery, New York City, New York
- June 8 – July 15, 2016 – Make Painting Great Again, CANADA Gallery, New York City, New York

== See also ==
- Porfirio DiDonna
- Shirazeh Houshiary
- Agnes Martin
- Roman Opalka
