= Ted Goff =

American cartoonist

Ted Goff is an American cartoonist who specializes in business and industrial safety cartoons.

== Career ==
Goff is a cartoonist who says, "I've been drawing cartoons forever, and selling them since 1980". He specializes in drawing business and safety cartoons.

== Appearances ==
The "About Me" section of Goff's website states: "My cartoons have appeared in hundreds of publications around the world, and have been used in ads, presentations, T-shirts, newsletters, textbooks and posters. Thanks to the web, I often hear from great people on every continent who need cartoons to accompany their ideas." His work has appeared in print, in Harvard Business Review, The Saturday Evening Post, The Wall Street Journal, and many other publications, as well as online; "Mostly Business" is a daily business cartoon for intranets and web pages.

== Awards ==
In 2001, Goff received the National Cartoonist Society Silver T-Square Award, awarded by unanimous vote of the NCS Board of Directors, to persons who have demonstrated outstanding dedication or service to the Society or the profession.
