= Elisabetta Gnone =

Italian writer (born 1965)

- Born: November 13, 1965 (age 60); Genua, Italy
- Occupations: Journalist and writer of novels
- Writing career
- Language: Italian
- Years active: 2001–present
- Genre: Fantasy literature
- Notable works: W.I.T.C.H. Fairy Oak; Olga Made of Paper

Elisabetta Gnone (born 13 November 1965) is an Italian writer. She is best known as the co-creator of the Italian comic series W.I.T.C.H..

== Biography ==
Gnone became a journalist Weekly in 1992. This was only the beginning of a career that would take her to Walt Disney Company, where she collaborated in the series of monthly publications of Bambi, Minnie & Comp. and the Small Series, and created, in 1997, the publication of Winnie the Pooh. She then published The Secret of the Twins in 2005. The book was developed into a trilogy focused around the magical world of Fairy Oak.

In April 2001, she co-created the Italian comic/magazine W.I.T.C.H. with Alessandro Barbucci and Barbara Canepa. The publication was later made into a television series of the same name. Gnone also wrote the children's trilogy Fairy Oak: Il segreto delle gemelle (The Secret of the Twins), D L'incanto del Buio (The Spell of Darkness), and Il potere della Luce (The Power of Light). She expanded the Fairy Oak Universe with four more books, "The Four Mysteries": "Captain Grisam's love", "Shirley's Wizarding Days", "Flox Smiles in Autumn", and "Good-Bye Fairy Oak".
