= Culture Palace of Abidjan =

Temple of culture in Abidjan, Ivory Coast

Coordinates: 5°18′43″N 4°0′45″W

- View from the bay
- Established: 1 October 1999
- Location: Abidjan, Ivory Coast
- Type: Fine arts
- Director: Sidiki Bakaba
- Website: Palaisdelaculture.ci

The Palace of Culture entrance

Culture Palace of Abidjan (Palais de la Culture d'Abidjan) is a temple of culture in Abidjan, Ivory Coast (Côte d’Ivoire).

The building is situated between the Houphouët-Boigny Bridge and the General de Gaulle Bridge.

Culture Palace of Abidjan, with a capacity of 9,400 people, was bestowed to the Ivorian government as a gift from China. It was inaugurated on 1 October 1999 during the official handover of the keys. It was constructed on a 12,000 square meter site.

Conducted by Sidiki Bakaba since the year of 2000. Sidiki Bakaba, was honored for lifetime achievement on 10 July 2009, in the Pan-African Cultural Festival in Algiers.

Since 12 November 2002, the first Fokker F27 Friendship airplane of Ivory Coast, which has a 16-person capacity, is transformed into a library for children books and annex events.

== Events ==
- First edition of the competition "Chant'Ivoir 2011" from 1 May–21 June 2011
- Bonjour 2011, the sketch comedy show, 02/01/ 2011
- 13th Edition of the Festival of the African Cinema Cinema of Africa of Khouribga, 10 July 2010
- Highlight Edition 2010, the Ceremony of distinction the Best Artists of the Burida, 10 April 2010
- Concert "My shout of heart for Haiti", 7 March 2010
- Conference on Native Americans, 22 December 2009
