= W.I.T.C.H. =

Italian fantasy comics series

- Promotional poster featuring the five members of the current generation of Guardians of the Veil, with leader Will holding the mystical Heart of Kandrakar

Publication information
- Publisher: Disney Italy
- Schedule: Monthly
- Format: Ended
- Genre: Contemporary fantasy; Supernatural; Magical girl
- Publication date: April 2001 – October 2012
- No. of issues: 139 (main series); 16 (specials)
- Main characters: Will Vandom; Irma Lair; Taranee Cook; Cornelia Hale; Hay Lin

Creative team
- Created by: Elisabetta Gnone; Alessandro Barbucci; Barbara Canepa
- Written by: Elisabetta Gnone; Francesco Artibani; Bruno Enna; Teresa Radice; Paola Mulazzi; Alessandro Ferrari; Augusto Macchetto
- Pencillers: Alessandro Barbucci; Daniela Vetro; Donald Soffritti; Paolo Campinoti; Alessia Martusciello; (main pencillers)

W.I.T.C.H. (stylised as W.i.t.c.h.) is an Italian fantasy Disney comics series created by Elisabetta Gnone, Alessandro Barbucci, and Barbara Canepa. The series features a group of five teenage girls who become the guardians of the classical elements of energy, water, fire, earth, and air, and protectors of the mythical Kandrakar, the center of the universe. The story follows them as they handle their new magical powers and responsibilities, as well as their lives as adolescents. The comics art illustration heavy inspiration from manga and its illustrations conventions. The names of the five characters form the titular acronym, despite the characters not actually being witches.

The series was first published by Disney Italy in April 2001. The final issue of W.I.T.C.H. was released in October 2012, concluding the series' 139 issue run.

The comics spawned a franchise with a variety of printed media, including both reprinted and original content, as well as audiovisual media. The first two arcs (The Twelve Portals and Nerissa's Revenge) were loosely adapted into an animated series, itself influenced by anime, which aired from 2004 to 2006. In 2005, a video game based on the franchise was released in Europe, and in 2007 a soundtrack album including theme songs for the TV series as well as music inspired by the comics was released.

In 2004, series creators Alessandro Barbucci and Barbara Canepa unsuccessfully sued Disney for rights to W.I.T.C.H. after issues with management at the publishing company. As a result, Canepa founded her own comics company.

On October 4, 2023, a reboot graphic novel, W.I.T.C.H. - Il cuore dell'amicizia, was published in Italy.

== Background and production ==
Upon seeing the success of PKNA - Paperinik New Adventures with young male audiences, some of the writers began thinking of a similar concept that would work for young female audiences. Elisabetta Gnone, Alessandro Barbucci and Barbara Canepa came up with the original concepts and designs. Gnone co-wrote the first issue of the series with Francesco Artibani. Gnone and Artibani originally created a concept that would last nine issues, but upon seeing the impressive sales numbers, a further three issues were ordered, rounding out the 12-issue first saga.

In 2004, tensions arose between the W.I.T.C.H. artists and Disney's publishing (Buena Vista). Series creators Barbucci and Canepa unsuccessfully sued Disney for the initial rights to W.I.T.C.H., with Artibani acting as a witness in support of the two artists in court. After the lawsuit failed, Artibani and other artists decided to end their working relationships with Disney due to the "difficult management and company".

After breaking off with Buena Vista and in the middle of her trial against them, Canepa created her own comic book company, Soleil. She described it as a way to become "more sincere and uncensored" with her comics. Soleil was unable to secure the rights to W.I.T.C.H. from Disney, and instead focused on original projects. Canepa stated that she intended to keep all the rights to her comics; she said, "After my experience with Disney, it's important for me to protect myself."

Around the same time as the rights trial, Disney filed an unsuccessful copyright infringement lawsuit against Rainbow SpA, the studio behind Winx Club (a series cited as the main competition for W.I.T.C.H.). In its April 2004 suit, the corporation claimed the Winx Club concept copied that of W.I.T.C.H.; all of the claims were rejected in August, when Rainbow SpA won the case against Disney by providing proof that Winx Club production began before the W.I.T.C.H. comic was available.

== Characters ==
The main characters are the five current Guardians (with respective elemental powers in parentheses):

- Wilhelmina "Will" Vandom (energy)
- Irma Lair (water)
- Taranee Cook (fire)
- Cornelia Hale (earth)
- Hay Lin (wind)

Each of the five Guardians' powers are fueled by Kandrakar itself, and transmitted to the Heart via the Aurameres, the physical representations of the five elements in the forms of colored orbs. The Aurameres grant the same powers to each generation of Guardians.

When the Guardians transform, they change form and grow wings. The wings do not allow them to fly (except for Hay Lin), but after they get the New Powers they can all fly.

== Setting ==
=== Heatherfield ===
Located on Earth, this city is the home of the five Guardians.

=== Kandrakar ===
Kandrakar is a sacred, ethereal realm at the very center of the universe, a place where time and space hold do not exist. Within its Fortress, the wisest beings from thousands of worlds gather to discuss the state of the worlds which are of their concern. They observe, but never interfere.

The mystical Heart of Kandrakar, an ancient and immensely powerful crystal orbicular pendant. Its rightful keeper is the fifth and final Guardian, and through it the girls draw the power to transform into their taller, stronger Guardian forms. When Hay Lin’s paternal grandmother appears to die suddenly on Earth, she comes to live in Kandrakar alongside the Oracle.

=== Metamoor ===
Metamoor is a world ruled by the Escanor, who originate from Earth. For a long time Metamoor, and its capital Meridian, was isolated from the rest of the universe because it was ruled by the evil prince Phobos. With help of the Guardians and the Meridian people, the rightful heiress to the throne, Elyon, could reign again. Elyon is the last of the Escanor.

=== Arkhanta ===
Arkhanta is an Earth-like world ruled by Ari. Ari accused the Oracle for not wanting to cure his son. Even the banshee Yua was unable to help him. With trickery, Ari could keep Yua in his scarlet citadel forever. Despite all this, Ari brought prosperity to his people. Knowing they had received everything thanks to the powers of Yua, the people are both happy and disturbed. Fortunately, after the Guardians released Yua and healed Ari's son Maqui, any threat of Yua's anger was over. On his turn, Ari ended his hostility against Kandrakar.

=== Basiliade ===
Basiliade is the home world of the Oracle (Himerish), Endarno, and Orube. It makes up part of a binary solar system.

== Comics ==
=== Part I: The Twelve Portals ===
The first saga introduced a world called Metamoor, ruled by a tyrannical ruler named Prince Phobos. Years ago, Prince Phobos caused the disappearances of his parents and took over the capital city of Metamoor, Meridian. To prevent him from spreading tyranny throughout the universe, the Oracle - the ruler of Kandrakar - lowered a veil over the planet, separating Metamoor from the rest of the universe under Kandrakar's protection. However, twelve portals opened between Meridian and Earth, creating a series of passageways for the desperate refugees and monsters of Meridian to infiltrate Earth. The portals also weakened the veil; in order to prevent its total collapse, generations of Guardians were sent to protect it. In the present day, five girls are chosen to become the new Guardians: Will Vandom, the Guardian of Energy and the Keeper of the Heart; Irma Lair, the Guardian of Water; Taranee Cook, the Guardian of Fire; Cornelia Hale, the Guardian of Earth; and Hay Lin, the Guardian of Air. Together, they must prevent the collapse of the veil and promote justice throughout the universe under the guidance of the Oracle of Kandrakar.

The first saga also introduced Elyon Brown, a childhood friend of Cornelia. The Guardians' first mission was to close the twelve portals, but as they found out for themselves, Elyon had betrayed them. It is revealed that Elyon is Prince Phobos's younger sister who had disappeared from Meridian more than a decade ago. After Prince Phobos's right-hand man, Lord Cedric, revealed Elyon of her true alien heritage, he manipulated her into thinking that the Guardians were her enemies. The Guardians had to find a way to defeat Prince Phobos and bring Elyon back home. In Meridian, however, there is a rebellion taking place led by Caleb, whom Cornelia had seen in her dreams for years. They sought to overthrow Prince Phobos and put Elyon on the throne, as she is the legitimate ruler. The Guardians later worked together with the rebels and eventually, Elyon realized her mistake of trusting Lord Cedric. Prince Phobos had planned to absorb his sister's powers for himself during her coronation, but with the Guardians' help, Elyon escaped and later battled against him for the crown. The final battle was successful, but not without some losses. Prince Phobos transformed Caleb back into a crystal flower, his most primitive form as a Murmurer. This devastated Cornelia greatly to the point where it would haunt her in the next series. As Elyon is crowned Queen and the Light of Meridian, the world of Metamoor is finally liberated. The Oracle lifted the veil off of Metamoor and light shines on the world once again. Both Prince Phobos and Cedric are imprisoned in the Tower of Mist.

No.	Title	Original release date	English release date
1	Part I: The Twelve Portals	April 2001	July 2002
1. Halloween; 2. The Twelve Portals; 3. The Dark Dimensions; 4. The Power of Fire; 5. So Be It Forever; 6. Illusions and Lies; 7. One Day You'll Meet Him; 8. The Black Roses of Meridian; 9. The Four Dragons; 10. A Bridge Between Two Worlds; 11. The Crown of Light; 12. The Challenge of Phobos

=== Part II: Nerissa's Revenge ===
The Guardians must face an old enemy of Kandrakar – Nerissa, the corrupted ex-Guardian and the previous Keeper of the Heart. When the Oracle realized how the immense power of the Heart was corrupting Nerissa, he took it away from her and gave it to Cassidy, the former Guardian of Water. Obsessed with her lost power and blinded by jealousy, Nerissa tricked Cassidy and killed her. As punishment, Nerissa was stripped of her magic and sentenced to sleep, alone and friendless, in Mount Thanos for an eternity, only until all five elements-Water, Fire, Earth, Air and Pure/Absolute Energy- united into one single being.

When Cornelia accidentally, and unknowingly, absorbed all five elements into herself, the seal on Nerissa's tomb broke, setting her free. When Caleb is kidnapped, the Guardians must face Nerissa along with her four Knights of Vengeance. While successful in their rescue mission, they end up losing Luba who sacrificed herself to save them. Hoping to steal the Heart she craved for so long, Nerissa later attacked the girls through their dreams in order to weaken them but failed. She was later successful in stealing the Heart back by tricking Will into giving it to her.

With the very symbol and essence of Kandrakar itself now entirely corrupted by Nerissa's hatred and vengeance, the former Guardian leader and her Knights of Vengeance attacked the sacred Temple of Kandrakar itself. Will later acquired the Star of Cassidy, a copy of the mystical Heart from the spirit/ghost of Cassidy, the late and original Guardian of Water. With it, Will and her fellow Guardians faced Nerissa in Kandrakar. In the final battle, Nerissa was ultimately destroyed by the combined strength of the second generation of Guardians. Despite their victory, Cornelia is deeply heartbroken when Caleb left her due to their complicated relationship.

No.	Title	Original release date	English release date
2	Part II: Nerissa's Revenge	April 2002	July 2003
13. I Know Who You Are; 14. The End of a Dream; 15. The Courage to Choose; 16. Nerissa's Seal; 17. Don't Close Your Eyes!; 18. Remnants of Summer; 19. The Other Side of the Story; 20. A Gust of Doubt; 21. Shadows of Tomorrow; 22. A Broken Heart; 23. Goodbye!; 24. Trust Me!

=== Part III: A Crisis on Both Worlds ===
Crisis after crisis threatens to break up the girls once and for all. Will's father, Thomas Vandom, returns into her life after years of absence, and his intentions are anything but loving and trustful. Later, Taranee went on strike because she felt that the Oracle is using them to carry out his missions and sentences. A new character, Orube, joins the remaining Guardians on their new mission to defeat a new enemy; Ari, the powerful lord of Arkhanta and they must prevent him from rising and destroying the Oracle. Ari's son, Maqi, suffered from a strange disorder since birth and the Oracle had refused to help Ari cure his son. Angered and blinded by rage, Ari captured a banshee, named Yua, and tried to use her wish-granting power to oppose the Oracle and Kandrakar (but it could not be done). The longer Yua was held prisoner and serving as Ari's slave, the more powerful Ari becomes, and soon, he would have enough power to overthrow the Oracle.

Taranee later rejoined the quintet and together, they were able to defeat Ari and set Yua free. Liberated, Yua kidnapped Maqi because she wanted Ari to suffer for holding her imprisoned for many years against her will. Ari and the Guardians followed her into the swamp where she and her banshee sisters live and fought them to bring Maqi back. However, Maqi was nearly killed during the confusion of the battle. He was later saved and cured when the Guardians and Orube offered their magical, elemental gifts from the nymph Xin Jing herself to him.

Although their missions on the world Arkhanta was successful, the girls have a whole bunch of new problems on Earth that needs their attention: Interpol discovers the secret of the five Guardians' and wants to capture them and use their astounding abilities as Guardians of Kandrakar for their dark intentions. As if that was not enough, the girls' Astral Drops decide to rebel after months of being taken advantage of by the Guardians. The Astral Drops started to cause numerous problems between the Guardians' families, teachers, and individual boyfriends' and eventually they ran away to another city. The Guardians later recaptured the Astral Drops and decided to liberate them from slavery by sending to another city entirely.

No.	Title	Original release date	English release date
3	Part III: A Crisis on Both Worlds	April 2003	July 2004
25. Water Shadows; 26. Blackmail; 27. Divided; 28. So Close, Yet So Far; 29. The Lesser Evil; 30. The Chamber of Tempests; 31. The Voice of Silence; 32. Behind the Mask; 33. The Greatest Gift; 34. The Scent of Freedom; 35. Mirrored Lives; 36. Rebel Souls

=== Part IV: Trial of the Oracle ===
The members of the Congregation are questioning the Oracle's recent actions, and he shocked everyone by putting himself on trial. The Guardians are called in to recall his recent unsatisfactory deeds and he was later found guilty by Endarno and was banished back into his home world, Basilíade. Back home in Heatherfield, Will confronted Orube and Matt, while Principal Knickerbocker goes to drastic measures to raise the girls' grades at Sheffield. In Kandrakar, the council has elected Endarno the new Oracle. After Endarno has been chosen, he makes the life of the Guardians difficult by trying to prove to the Congregation that they are too young and immature. He also convinced the Congregation that Elyon, the queen and the Light of Meridian, is dangerous and unfit to rule over Metamoor. Many times he tried to get the Guardians to arrest their old friend and bring him the Crown of Light. But W.I.T.C.H. managed to hide Elyon from Endarno by smuggling her back to Earth and had Orube protect her. Moreover, Endarno is someone else than he appears to be...an old enemy coming back for revenge and an even bigger thirst for more power. Elyon and Yan Lin discovered that "Endarno" is actually the consciousness and evil will of Prince Phobos, who has been using the physical self of the true Endarno, in his new quest for power and revenge.

Queen Elyon then wields her vital life energy to Yan Lin, who then gives it to Will to hide within the Heart of Kandrakar for safeguarding. The Guardians were able to locate the old Oracle, now called Himerish, upon the discovery of his old identity before leaving for Kandrakar, with the help of Orube. Together, they tried to free Elyon from her prison and put a stop to Cedric and Phobos before Endarno (Phobos) is formally instated as the Oracle. In the end, Himerish was able to locate the real Endarno and he, in turn, revealed to the Council that the Endarno that they knew was, in actuality, the malicious Prince Phobos' mind and spirit in his body. Elyon returned to power on her world of Meridian, Cedric was back in the Tower of Mist, and Prince Phobos, rather than being locked up in prison again, threw himself into the endless void of Kandrakar.

No.	Title	Original release date	English release date
4	Part IV: Trial of the Oracle	April 2004	July 2005
37. The Dispute; 38. Desires of the Heart; 39. On the Wings of Remembrance; 40. The Ultimate Secret; 41. The Whole Truth; 42. Beyond All Hope; 43. Tricks of Light; 44. Never Alone, Ever Again; 45. Double Deception; 46. The Power of Courage; 47. The Sands of Time; 48. New Horizons

=== Part V: The Book of Elements ===
The five classical elements themselves have something in store for the Guardians who utilize and represent them. Each Guardian has discovered new and much stronger abilities, yet their elemental abilities are going out of control. Even the Triumvirate of Kandrakar does not have full understanding about it. At the same time, Cedric is disposed of his magical strength and power and gets a second chance from Oracle Himerish. He returns to "Ye Olde Book Shop" to live a decent life, under supervision from the Guardians. Nevertheless, he searches for a useful resource to regain his powers in hopes of getting revenge on the Guardians. He finds his luck in the Book of Elements, written by Jonathan Ludmoore (which the Guardians later found out). About a century before, Jonathan Ludmoore was an alchemist who came from Metamoor and it was Prince Phobos who had sent him to Heatherfield in order to open the Twelve Portals. After completing his mission, Ludmoore discovered that the city is a place where all five elements—Water, Fire, Earth, Air, Quintessence—met and stayed. He experimented on the elements but it trapped Ludmoore in his own book and released all five elemental stones throughout the city.

After Matt was swallowed by the Book of Elements (thanks to Cedric), the Guardians must cooperate with Cedric in order to save Matt. The book gives them riddles as clues and the Guardians must use these riddles to look for the scattered elemental stones. Endarno warned the Guardians that in order to capture these stones, they must face the Elemental Guards that stand and protect them. One by one, the girls were able to find the stones, and back in the bookstore, Cedric and Orube slowly fell deeply in love. However, the Guardians, Cedric, and Orube were sucked into the world of the book when Will refuses to surrender the Heart of Kandrakar. Cedric was later killed by Ludmoore and dissolved into ink when he tried to protect Orube from Ludmoore's deadly gaze. The Guardians later found Matt and managed to defeat Ludmoore once and for all (with Matt's help). While Orube mourns for Cedric's death, Will's mother, Susan Vandom, married her history teacher, Dean Collins. Orube left and a magical portal in the shape of the Heart of Kandrakar later appeared in the basement of the "Ye Olde Book Shop".

No.	Title	Original release date	English release date
5	Part V: The Book of Elements	April 2005	July 2006
49. Between Dreams and Reality; 50. Forever Magic; 51. Out of Control; 52. The Eye of the Book; 53. A Whole New Song; 54. One More Hug; 55. The Day After; 56. The Riddle; 57. The Isle Of Memories; 58. Illusions; 59. The Fire Within; 60. Air and Earth; 61. The World Inside the Book; 62. Between the Pages; 63. Arrival and Departure

=== Part VI: Ragorlang ===
When Hay Lin stayed over at the Lyndons' home, she meets Karl and Tecla Ibsen, an elderly couple who appeared to have a connection with Eric's new school. Karl tells Hay Lin about the Ragorlang, a monster that absorbs the thoughts, the voices, and the sounds of its victims. Coincidentally, a few students at Eric's school are getting inactive as if they had lost their youthful strength. The same evening, Hay Lin gets attacked by a Ragorlang and was saved just in time by the other Guardians. Soon they discovered who is behind the new threat: Tecla Ibsen. She wanted to be young and beautiful again and used her magical ability to conjure up and control the Ragorlangs, ordering them to steal the youthful strength of the teenagers by absorbing their thoughts and voices. The Guardians managed to defeat her and her Ragorlang. Unfortunately, Tecla returns, but as a frail, older woman, who cannot summon a fully grown Ragorlang. Tecla brainwashed a magical girl named Erin, making her believe that the Guardians are the Ragorlangs and that it was their fault that her brother, Kader, went missing. At first, Erin uses her magic to make the girls hate each other while posing as an exchange student. The Guardians eventually helped her find her brother despite their hate for her.

This saga also introduced a strange optometrist, named Folkner, who stationed himself in Sheffield to monitor the students' health. The Guardians found out that he is a Ragorlang hunter who wishes to hunt down Tecla Ibsen. She later regained full power due to leaked magics from Kandrakar and attacked the Guardians with a new pact of Ragorlangs. Despite being able to use the Shadow Heart against the Guardians, she was defeated when the last of her Ragorlangs was absorbed into a box created by Folkner. Obsessed with the dark power, Folkner unleashed the powers and became a supreme Ragorlang himself. He was later killed by the Guardians and was sucked into his own Ragorlang box at the end of the saga, and Karl and Tecla were both accepted into the Congregation of Kandrakar after admitting their mistakes.

No.	Title	Original release date	English release date
6	Part VI: Ragorlang	July 2006	October 2007
64. The Screaming Man; 65. Only a Flower; 66. Reflection; 67. From Your Part; 68. The Dark Side; 69. New Frontiers; 70. Silent Stamp; 71. Glimmers of Fear; 72. The Green Ray; 73. The Dark Summons; 74. Whisked Away

=== Part VII: New Power ===
The Guardians must face another, more ancient enemy: Dark Mother. She was once Queen Meter of Spring and made flowers bloom beneath her feet. But when she became corrupted, she transformed into "the Dark Mother" and attacked Kandrakar with a vengeance. She was ultimately defeated by the combined strength of the elemental Queens of Water, Fire and Air and was cast into the dark void where she continued to wait patiently in chains until she could be released. In silence, Dark Mother sent a seed and planted it deep within Kandrakar, where it would serve as her infiltrator against the Fortress of Light.

The five Guardians of Kandrakar each receive further developed and considerably stronger Guardian powers over the five elements upon undergoing a vision-quest to unlock the very roots of their abilities as well as their highest potential. Matt now serves as their new trainer and mentor after being recruited by the Oracle to prepare them for their upcoming battle against Dark Mother. One by one, the Guardians found the root of their elements and obtained full control over their new and much stronger abilities. Meanwhile, Dark Mother escaped (thanks to Will) and set off to take over Kandrakar. Thanks to her tree, which she had planted beforehand, Dark Mother enslaved the minds of Kandrakar, except for Yan Lin. The Guardians later faced her in one last battle and Dark Mother was sealed in a stone tomb. Oracle Himerish relinquished his place to the original Air Guardian, Yan Lin, who foresaw the incoming threat and departed without even saying goodbye.

In the side story, Susan became pregnant with Dean's child. Issue #80 focuses on the birth of Will's younger half-brother, William Vandom-Collins who happens to possess a little magic of his own.

No.	Title	Original release date	English release date
7	Part VII: New Power	June 2007	September 2008
75. As You Were, You Are Now; 76. Earth; 77. All of the Stars; 78. Fire; 79. Water; 80. Emotions; 81. Air; 82. Energy; 83. Return to Kandrakar; 84. Unique Movements; 85. I Am You; 86. In the Heart

=== Part VIII: Teach 2^{b} Witch ===
The Guardians must find and teach the magical people of Heatherfield how to fully control their new abilities. Oracle Yan Lin assisted them by giving them new weapons to help greatly strengthen and magnify their powers and abilities as well as the key to the W.I.T.C.H. Van, a special on-the-road-school which houses five magical laboratories connected to each Guardians' elements, personalities, and skills. Kandor, a member of the Congregation is sent to be their new bus driver and care-taker. Meanwhile, a new enemy is watching their every move: Foreman Takeda the CEO and scientist of Takeshita Inc. Takeda vowed to destroy all magic because he believed it to be responsible for his daughter's illness. Mariko, his eldest daughter, discovered the Fast World and her mind became trapped there. Takeda enlisted the help of Liam, a mysterious boy Mariko met in the Fast World and fell in love with, to spy on the Guardians and ordered him to kidnap Will's little brother. Using Liam and William as bait, Takeda lured the Guardians into his lair and used his cold technologies to trap the Guardians into the 'Fast World forever'. However, his plan was thwarted by his youngest daughter, Shinobu, who saw her father's cruelty and had him frozen by his own robotic minions.

While looking for Liam and William in the Fast World, the Guardians encounter the malicious ruler Arkaam, the White Queen, who wished to rule all of the Fast World under her tyranny and possessed a deep desire to kill the Black Queen. It is revealed that the identity of the Black Queen is Mariko's conscious and Shinobu's sister. In the confusion of their escape, Liam was killed by the White Queen after she stabbed him with her sword. Although successful in bringing William back, Will and her friends are horrified that the White Queen and her army had followed them to their world. In their last battle, the invading White Queen and her army were dissipated by the Guardians' powerful sound frequency. After hearing Mariko's accusation and Shinobu's forgiveness, Takeda forgot his vendetta and rejoined his family.

- Beginning from issue #97 onward, most W.I.T.C.H. comic issue is its own story.

No.	Title	Original release date	English release date
8	Part VIII: Teach 2b Witch	June 2008	September 2009
87. A Cold Magic; 88. Which One of You?; 89. The Key to Summer; 90. A Beating Heart; 91. So Much More; 92. No Longer Alone; 93. From A Place Far Away; 94. The Settlement; 95. Endless Tears; 96. Here Inside the Heart; 97. The Magic of the World; 98. Wonderful, After All; 99. A Dive into the Air

=== Part IX: 100% Witch ===
Starting from issue #97 of the previous saga, each issue has its own story. The Guardians now face their daily problems from families, friends, and school. The stories range from facing their first day of returning to Sheffield Institute to finding out more about both of their parents' pasts and abilities. At the same time, they must face several new enemies who wanted to destroy them. These villains included the Runics, a group of five evil wizards who control the dark powers of the elements; and Nihila, the Queen of Darkness who desires to weave and control everyone's destinies with her magical Loom. The series also introduced new missions where the Guardians must assist the beings of the natural worlds; from listening to the voice of the Earth to helping Mareeve, the Saarineen, avoid marrying the King of the Sharks, Orristurr. Later on, the stories ranged from the girls delivering a letter to the North Pole, Dean's parents visiting the girls and their mothers having lunch together.

No.	Title	Original release date	English release date
9	Part IX: 100% Witch	July 2009	October 2010
100. 100% Witch; 101. A Rising Star; 102. The First Day; 103. The One You're Not; 104. Another World; 105. One Letter from a Dream; 106. Zodiac; 107. It Was Fated; 108. A Father's Heart; 109. Green Truth; 110. Magical Moms; 111. Teamwork; 112. Early Days; 113. The Long Kiss; 114. Return to School; 115. A Special Journey; 116. The Right Distance; 117. The Best Occasion

=== Part X: Ladies vs. W.I.T.C.H. ===
From issue number 118 onwards, the concept of arcs is dropped. All issues are self-contained stories, though issues 120, 123, and 126 are connected to each other, as the Guardians deal with siblings Lady Giga, Lady Crash and Lady Kimikal, who wanted to steal their energies. Issues 128 and 129 are also connected as it focuses on Will and Matt's fight.

No.	Title	Original release date	English release date
10	Part X: (Ladies vs. W.I.T.C.H.)	January 2011	April 2012
118. All in a Day; 119. Music in the Air; 120. Lady Giga; 121. Ten Years Later; 122. Mathematically Possible; 123. Lady Crash; 124. A Friendly Creature; 125. The Other Half; 126. Lady Kimikal; 127. Embrace; 128. Just One Word; 129. Far From the Heart

=== Part XI: Magical Sovereigns ===
From issue 130 through issue 139, the saga has been named the "Magical Sovereigns", with individual stories. Elyon the Queen of Meridian returns to Kandrakar in this saga, giving missions to the Guardians in order for them to become Magical Sovereigns. Oracle Himerish also returns in Issue 139.

No.	Title	Original release date	English release date
11	Part XI: Magical Sovereigns	January 2012	April 2013
130. A New Friend; 131. The Magic of Emotions; 132. Always Together; 133. Little Magic; 134. Tomorrow; 135. Similar at Heart; 136. Over the Net; 137. Tell Me; 138. A Different World; 139. Witch!

=== Special issues ===
Aside from the original series, the Walt Disney Company Italia had published several special issues depicting the lives of the Guardians and their friends taking place on the side lines from the original canon issues. The following is a list of special issues that have been published thus far:

- The Year Before
- Elyon: Return of the Queen
- Cornelia and Caleb: A Love Not Meant to Be
- Core of Kandrakar
- Planet Boys
- Orube Special
- Two Hearts for a Ball: World Cup Special
- Christmas Special 2004
- Christmas Special 2005
- Christmas Special 2006
- W.I.T.C.H. Look Book
- Caleb and Elyon - Two Destinies
- W.I.T.C.H. on Stage
- Halloween Special 2007
- Olympic Games 2008 Special
- Night of Magic

== Reception ==
=== Critical response ===
Valentina De Zanche of i-D described the main characters of W.I.T.C.H. as the "emblem of the Y2K style," writing, "One of the strengths of the comic, which has become an essential model emulated by dozens of products of the same genre, was in fact to propose five protagonists with as many different and well-defined profiles in terms of character and, of course, of style and choice of looks. Despite being endowed with super powers, it was easy to empathize with one of the W.I.T.C.H. and feel like one of them, empathizing with their difficult situations and worrying about them when the secret of double identity was put at risk—always more fascinating trick than any superhero." Mara Pace of Corriere della Sera called W.I.T.C.H. a "very successful product," saying, "What prompted American Mickey Mouse managers to export this comic made in italy? The captivating narrative structure and the quality of the design, which mixes European tradition and Japanese suggestions, have certainly played a fundamental role." Beatrice Manca of Fanpage.it stated that the comic book series became a "cult," stating, "For many women now almost in their thirties, the W.I.T.C.H have been confidants, friends, models. Once transformed, with their wings and mythical green and purple costumes, they joined forces to fight enemies. But in everyday life they experienced the powers of friendship, loyalty, courage. They had their flaws: they quarreled, walked away, lied to their parents. But that's exactly what we felt close to them: they were looking for their way."

La Nazione referred to W.I.T.C.H as a "truly magical editorial phenomenon," asserting, "The masterful characterization of the characters is among the most striking strengths of the series, along with the centrality given to the emotional sphere of the heroines." Laura Thornton of Comic Book Resources compared the W.I.T.C.H comic books to the 2004 television adaptation of the same name, writing, "While both comic and show are wonderful stories, they aren't the same story. The comic puts more focus on interpersonal relationships and realistically depicting how the girls come to terms with their newfound duties and friendship, while the show focuses more on the action, adventure and laughs to be had along the way." Fumettologica included W.I.T.C.H in their "20 Comics To Remember Released In 2001" list, asserting, "Not (only) the best, not (only) guilty pleasure, but the most indicative of our memory, partly because they are truly representative of that publishing year, partly because their influence extended well beyond 2001 alone."

=== Sales and revenue ===
In 2001, W.I.T.C.H. sold more than 6 million copies in the first year of its publication, making it the most successful tween magazine launch ever. In 2004, The Walt Disney Company announced that the W.I.T.C.H. comic book series was available in more than 60 countries, with more than 1 million copies of the comic book series being sold every month. In France and Germany, more than 100 000 copies were sold monthly. In Italy, more than 200 000 copies were sold every month. The company revealed that the W.I.T.C.H. comic book series sold more than 20 million copies worldwide and generated more than 100 million dollars. In 2005, the comic book series had been released in over 65 countries. The W.I.T.C.H. franchise generated more than $500 million in revenues so far, including from comic books sales. In 2022, Angelo Delos Trinos of Comic Book Resources called the comic book series a "massive success" in Scandinavia.

=== Accolades ===
In 2001, the W.I.T.C.H. comic book series won the Lucca Comics & Games' Gran Guinigi for Best Italian Series. In 2004, it won the Max & Moritz Prize for Best German-language Comic/Comic-related Publication: For Children and Young People.

== Other printed media ==
After the success of the 2001 release of the W.I.T.C.H. comic magazines, Disney Publishing Worldwide expanded the W.I.T.C.H. franchise.

=== Chapter books ===
The W.I.T.C.H. book series consists of twenty-six books; all are adapted from the comic series by either Elizabeth Lenhard or Alice Alfonsi, but have entirely different titles than those of the graphic novel series. Each contains comic inserts from the original comics. The book series was designed for UK and USA release and preceded the graphic novel adaptation in the United States.

- The Power of Five (Elizabeth Lenhard)
- The Disappearance (Elizabeth Lenhard)
- Finding Meridian (Elizabeth Lenhard)
- The Fire of Friendship (Elizabeth Lenhard)
- The Last Tear (Elizabeth Lenhard)
- Illusions and Lies (Elizabeth Lenhard)
- The Light of Meridian (Julie Komorn)
- Out of the Dark (Julie Komorn)
- The Four Dragons (Elizabeth Lenhard)
- A Bridge Between Worlds (Alice Alfonsi)
- The Crown of Light (Elizabeth Lenhard)
- The Return of a Queen (Elizabeth Lenhard)
- A Different Path (Elizabeth Lenhard)
- Worlds Apart (Alice Alfonsi)
- The Courage to Choose (Alice Alfonsi)
- Path of Revenge (Alice Alfonsi)
- The Darkest Dream (Alice Alfonsi)
- Keeping Hope (Alice Alfonsi)
- The Other Truth (Alice Alfonsi)
- Whispers of Doubt (Alice Alfonsi)
- A Weakened Heart (Alice Alfonsi)
- A Choice is Made (Alice Alfonsi)
- Farewell to Love (Alice Alfonsi)
- Trust Your Heart (Alice Alfonsi)
- Enchanted Waters (Alice Alfonsi)
- Friends Forever (Alice Alfonsi)

=== Original Adventures ===
A miniseries of five chapter books were produced in 2004 and 2005, each one featuring one of the five Guardians of the Veil narrating her own story in fighting a certain antagonist relating to one of them, or ancient evil being, with her four fellow Guardians. The second book, told in the eyes of Irma Lair, has not been available at either Amazon or any other book stores; said to be the only one out of print.

- When Lightning Strikes (by Will Vandom, Energy Guardian and Keeper of the Heart of Kandrakar)
- Enchanted Music (by Irma Lair, Water Guardian)
- Heartbreak Island (by Taranee Cook, Fire Guardian)
- Stolen Spring (by Cornelia Hale, Earth Guardian)
- The Cruel Empress (by Hay Lin, Air Guardian)

=== Graphic novels ===
Eight graphic novels were published by Hyperion Books in the United States. They were first released in 2005, each of them containing two issues from the comic book series. Included in every graphic novel was a miniature poster relating to the W.I.T.C.H. franchise. The titles of the graphic novels are as follows:

1. The Power of Friendship (Halloween and The Twelve Portals)
2. Meridian Magic (The Dark Dimension and The Power of Fire)
3. The Revealing (So Be It Forever and Illusions and Lies)
4. Between Light and Dark (One Day You'll Meet Him and The Black Roses of Meridian)
5. Legends Revealed (The Four Dragons and A Bridge Between Worlds)
6. Forces of Change (The Crown of Light and The Challenge of Phobos)
7. Under Pressure (I Know Who You Are and The End of a Dream)
8. An Unexpected Return (The Courage to Choose and Nerissa's Seal).

=== Yen Press republication ===
In 2017, Yen Press announced at San Diego Comic-Con that they would be reprinting the comics as W.I.T.C.H.: The Graphic Novel with new translations and will be releasing new graphic novels in the series for every 4 months beginning with the first story arc of the comic book series on Halloween. Each volume contains 3 or 4 chapters of the original comic, plus a few pages of additional content from the original magazines such as character profiles, bedrooms and wardrobes, information on various locations in the series, and how-to-draws. The books were published by Disney Comics in JY imprint. The following volumes, with some chapter names changed from the original release, have been published or announced so far:

No.	Title	English release date	English ISBN
01	Part I. The Twelve Portals, Volume 1	October 31, 2017	978-0-316-47692-8
001. "Halloween"; 002. "The Twelve Portals"; 003. "The Dark Dimension"; 004. "The Power of Fire"
02	Part I. The Twelve Portals, Volume 2	October 31, 2017	978-0-316-47696-6
005. "The Last Tear"; 006. "Illusions and Lies"; 007. "One Day You'll Meet Him"; 008. "The Black Roses of Meridian"
03	Part I. The Twelve Portals, Volume 3	October 31, 2017	978-0-316-47699-7
009. "The Four Dragons"; 010. "A Bridge Between Two Worlds"; 011. "The Crown of Light"; 012. "So Be It Forever"
04	Part II. Nerissa's Revenge, Volume 1	January 23, 2018	978-0-316-51834-5
013. "I Know Who You Are"; 014. "End of a Dream"; 015. "The Courage to Choose"; 016. "The Mark of Nerissa"
05	Part II. Nerissa's Revenge, Volume 2	January 23, 2018	978-0-316-47705-5
017. "Don't Close Your Eyes"; 018. "Fragments of Summer"; 019. "The Other Truth"; 020. "Whispers of Hatred"
06	Part II. Nerissa's Revenge, Volume 3	January 23, 2018	978-0-316-47707-9
021. "Under the Shadow Sign"; 022. "The Broken Heart"; 023. "Good-bye!"; 024. "Trust Me"
07	Part III. A Crisis on Both Worlds, Volume 1	May 29, 2018	978-0-316-47708-6
025. "Water Shadows"; 026. "The Ultimate Blackmail"; 027. "The Departure"; 028. "So Near, Yet So Far"
08	Part III. A Crisis on Both Worlds, Volume 2	May 29, 2018	978-0-316-47709-3
029. "The Lesser Evil"; 030. "The Path of the Wind"; 031. "The Voice of Silence"; 032. "A Play of Many Parts"
09	Part III. A Crisis on Both Worlds, Volume 3	May 29, 2018	978-0-316-47710-9
033. "The Greatest Gift"; 034. "Drops of Freedom"; 035. "Reflected Lives"; 036. "Rebel Spirits"
10	Part IV. Trial of the Oracle, Volume 1	September 25, 2018	978-0-316-47711-6
037. "The Dispute"; 038. "The Heart's Desire"; 039. "A Flutter of Wings"; 040. "The Last Secret"
11	Part IV. Trial of the Oracle, Volume 2	September 25, 2018	978-0-316-47712-3
041. "The Whole Truth"; 042. "No Hope"; 043. "The Magic of Light"; 044. "Never Alone Again"
12	Part IV. Trial of the Oracle, Volume 3	September 25, 2018	978-0-316-47713-0
045. "Double Deception"; 046. "The Strength of Courage"; 047. "The Sands of Time"; 048. "New Horizons"
13	Part V. The Book of Elements, Volume 1	January 22, 2019	978-1-975-38377-0
049. "Between Dream and Reality"; 050. "It's Magical Anyway"; 051. "Out of Control"; 052. "The Book's Eye"
14	Part V. The Book of Elements, Volume 2	January 22, 2019	978-1-975-38380-0
053. "Dancing to a Different Tune"; 054. "One More Hug"; 055. "The Day After"; 056. "The Riddle"
15	Part V. The Book of Elements, Volume 3	May 21, 2019	978-1-975-38383-1
057. "The Island of Memories"; 058. "Illusions"; 059. "The Jaws of the World"; 060. "Air and Earth"
16	Part V. The Book of Elements, Volume 4	May 21, 2019	978-1-975-38389-3
061. "The World Inside the Book"; 062. "Between the Pages"; 063. "Arrivals and Departures"; Celebrating 50 issues: "Pin Up Gallery"
17	Part VI. Ragorlang, Volume 1	September 17, 2019	978-1-975-33222-8
064. "The Screaming Man"; 065. "Only a Flower"; 066. "Reflected Memories"; 067. "On Your Side"
18	Part VI. Ragorlang, Volume 2	November 19, 2019	978-1-975-33224-2
068. "The Dark Side"; 069. "Beyond Borders"; 070. "Radio Silence"; 071. "The Mark of Fear"
19	Part VI. Ragorlang, Volume 3	July 21, 2020	978-1-975-33227-3
072. "The Green Flash"; 073. "The Black Beat"; 074. "At the Heart of It All"
20	Part VII. New Power, Volume 1	October 20, 2020	978-1-975-33298-3
075. "You're Back to Who You Used to Be"; 076. "Earth"; 077. "Of All the Stars"; 078. "Fire"
21	Part VII. New Power, Volume 2	December 15, 2020	978-1-975-33299-0
079. "Water"; 080. "Emotions"; 081. "Air"; 082. "Energy"
22	Part VII. New Power, Volume 3	March 23, 2021	978-1-975-33300-3
083. "Back to Kandrakar"; 084. "A Special Flow"; 085. "I am You"; 086. "The Heart of It All"
23	Part VIII. Teach 2b W.I.T.C.H., Volume 1	April 20, 2021	978-1-975-31768-3
087. "Cold Magic"; 088. "Who Among You?"; 089. "The Key to Summer"; 090. "Heart Skips a Beat"
24	Part VIII. Teach 2b W.I.T.C.H., Volume 2	June 22, 2021	978-1-975-31769-0
091. "More Than Meets the Eye"; 092. "No Longer Alone"; 093. "From Far Away"; 094. "The Reckoning"
25	Part VIII. Teach 2b W.I.T.C.H., Volume 3	August 17, 2021	978-1-975-31771-3
095. "Countless Tears"; 096. "Here In Your Heart"; 097. "The Magic of the World"; 098. "Sweet, in the End"; 099. "A Dive into the Air"
26	Part IX. 100% W.I.T.C.H., Volume 1	October 19, 2021	978-1-975-32321-9
100. "100% W.I.T.C.H."; 101. "The Nascent Star"; 102. "The First Day"; 103. "The One You're Not"; 104. "Another World"
27	Part IX. 100% W.I.T.C.H., Volume 2	February 08, 2022	978-1-975-32323-3
105. "A Special Letter"; 106. "Zodiac"; 107. "It Was Fate"; 108. "A Father's Heart"; "A Tricky Trade"; "Houston, We Have a Problem"
28	Part IX. 100% W.I.T.C.H., Volume 3	April 26, 2022	978-1-975-32325-7
109: The Green Truth; 110: Magical Moms; 111: Teamwork; 112: First Days; Green Hope; What's Truly Lucky
29	Part IX. 100% W.I.T.C.H., Volume 4	June 28, 2022	978-1-975-32327-1
113: The Long Kiss; 114: Back to School; 115: A Special Journey; 116: The Right Distance; 117: The Best Party
30	Part X. Ladies vs. W.I.T.C.H., Volume 1	April 18, 2023	978-1-975-34469-6
TBA

=== Manga ===
The comic was never published in Japan, and instead a manga based on the comic, with art by Haruko Iida (飯田晴子, Iida Haruko), was published by Kadokawa Shoten in their shōjo manga magazine Monthly Asuka and later collected in two tankōbon volumes between 2003 and 2004, upon which the comic was canceled. The paperback volumes contained covers by Daisuke Ehara (江原大介, Ehara Daisuke). The two volumes were also published in Italy and Eastern Europe by the Italian Disney Manga.

=== Indonesian version ===
W.I.T.C.H. has also published in Indonesia by m&c! Publishing (PT Gramedia Majalah). It ran from June 2001 until December 2006. Including extra 30 pages, and also bonuses inside of magazine.

=== Welcome Magazine ===
Welcome is a side magazine of W.I.T.C.H. In total, there are eleven issues of the magazine. It is only published in parts of Europe, and is not published in the UK or Australia. Its mascot is We, a creature from Basilíade. Welcome was included with the Italian W.I.T.C.H. magazine, starting with issue #64. The Swedish W.I.T.C.H. magazine started publishing Welcome stories much earlier, instead of publishing a separate magazine.

=== Lene Kaaberbøl ===
Danish author Lene Kaaberbøl has written nine novels set in the W.I.T.C.H. universe, which have been published in 2002 and 2003 in Denmark. The first five of them each have one of the five girls as the main character in the order of the first letters in their names (Will, Irma, Taranee, Cornelia, and Hay Lin).

- When Lightning Strikes (The Heart of the Salamander)
- Enchanted Music (The Music of the Silencer)
- Heartbreak Island (The Fire of the Ocean)
- Stolen Spring (Green Magic)
- The Cruel Empress (The Gruesome Empress)

Her next series of W.I.T.C.H. pockets is called Crystal Birds. It contains the following titles:

- The Stone Falcon
- The Talons of the Eagle
- The Shadow of the Owl
- The Golden Phoenix

=== Scandinavian releases ===
Books that have been released in The Czech Republic, Norway, Sweden, Finland, Germany, Denmark, Poland, Romania and Russia.

Ruben Eliassen

- Ibenholt Pyramiden (The Ebony Pyramid)

Josefine Ottesen

- Isblomsten (The Iceflower) 2004
- Den Gyldne Kilde (The Golden Spring) 2005

Maud Mangold

- Queen of the Night
- The Flame of Clarity

Lene Møller Jørgensen

- The Pristine Rose
- A Touch of a Star

Cecilie Eken

- The Wells of Fog
- The Storms of Windmor

== Audiovisual media ==
=== Soundtrack ===
A soundtrack album for the series was released in 2007: Music From and Inspired By W.I.T.C.H. Among other tracks inspired by the series, it includes full-length renditions of the first international TV series theme as well as the US version.

The song "The Power of Five" by Jillian Escobosa was used for promotional material, and official websites, prior to the TV series' launch. An official music video, featuring 3D models of the main characters and airing on MTV in Italy in 2007, was created by Marco Pavone for "W.I.T.C.H. Is In the House."

=== Possible live-action adaptation ===
In 2025, writer for the original animated series Trey Callaway revealed that the creators of W.I.T.C.H. have had meetings with Disney about potentially adapting their series into a live-action show for Disney+.
