= List of W.I.T.C.H. characters =

The following is a list of characters in the W.I.T.C.H. comic books. The series follows five teenage girls who possess magical powers over the five elements of nature. The main cast are at least the second generation of Guardians of Kandrakar.

== Main characters ==
The main characters all serve as Guardians of Kandrakar. They live in the fictional town of Heatherfield.

- Wilhelmina "Will" Vandom is the leader of W.I.T.C.H. and the keeper of the Heart of Kandrakar. Will moves from her hometown to Heatherfield with her newly divorced mother Susan Vandom, and meets the future members of W.I.T.C.H. at Sheffield Institute. As the Guardian of Energy, Will can project electricity and call lightning. She can also bring electrical appliances to life. Will also develops animal empathy, in contrast to Irma's limited mind control and Taranee's ever-developing telepathic abilities. In issue 80 (Emotions), Will's half-brother William is born.
- Irma Lair is the comic relief of the group, often cracking jokes even in dire situations. As the Guardian of Water, she has the power to manipulate water. Irma is later able to create water. She can implant suggestions in people's minds, and can see visions in water via hydromancy.
- Taranee Cook is intelligent, yet timid. Taranee is Will's first friend and also new to Sheffield Institute. As the Guardian of Fire, Taranee uses pyrokinesis, which is triggered by rage, and her powers are fierce and can be hard to control. Taranee learns that she was adopted in issue 78.
- Cornelia Hale is vain, but loyal and friendly. The most fashionable of the group, Cornelia often flirts with boys and is popular. As the Guardian of Earth, she can control stone, dirt, and certain metals, and can manipulate the growth of plants. She later gains telekinesis and prophetic visions.
- Hay Lin is cheerful, creative, and sometimes enthusiastic. She is Irma's best friend and the only member of the group who can fly while transformed. As the Guardian of Air, she can control air and wind, and can manipulate sound. Hay Lin later develops psychometry.

== Secondary characters ==
=== Boys ===
- Matt Olsen is Will's boyfriend, who sings and plays guitar for the band "Cobalt Blue." During the Trial of the Oracle story arc, he becomes aware of W.I.T.C.H., and after Will tells him her secret, their relationship progresses. Later, during the New Power arc, the old Oracle Himerish secretly makes Matt an emissary of Kandrakar.
- Martin Tubbs is a student at Sheffield Institute who is infatuated with Irma.
- Andrew Hornby is Irma's crush starting in The Twelve Portals story arc. Irma attends a party in her guardian form, and when Andrew offers to drive her home and tries to kiss her, Irma turns him into a frog.
- Stephen is Irma's boyfriend as of the seventh saga. He is a member of the U18, a group of young vigilantes living and working underground. Irma later tells him about her powers (though not about W.I.T.C.H.), and he becomes her confidante.
- Nigel Ashcroft is a quiet member of Uriah's gang who eventually leaves their company when he develops feelings for Taranee. Nigel tries his best to prove his good intentions to Taranee. After Taranee spends more time at Jensen Dance Academy and less with Nigel, Taranee breaks up with him. After the breakup, Nigel appears as a minor character.
- Caleb – Leader of the rebel forces opposed to Phobos' rule. Caleb has an on-and-off relationship with Cornelia. Later, he becomes a denizen of Meridian under Elyon's rule.
- Peter Lancelot Cook is Taranee's brother and Cornelia's current boyfriend. He is kind and loves to spend time with his family. He enjoys playing sports. In the past, despite Cornelia's love for Caleb, she could not help but find Peter cute (a feeling which he reciprocated), leading her to avoid him. During the Ragorlang arc, Peter and Cornelia get closer and eventually admit their love for each other.
- Eric Lyndon is Hay Lin's boyfriend, who lives at the Heatherfield Observatory with his astronomer grandfather, Zachary. He loves science and technology and has a great imagination. He owns an electric scooter and plays basketball. Hay Lin and Eric met when she was rollerblading and ran into his scooter. He moves away in the fifth arc, but continues to video-chat with Hay Lin.

=== The Council of Kandrakar ===
A few members of the Council of Kandrakar are human, such as Yan Lin, but the others are aliens.

- The Oracle – Originally called "Himerish," he is a denizen of the world of Basilíade. As ruler of Kandrakar, he gives the girls their powers. He can travel between dimensions, but acts as a guardian and is cautious with his abilities. In the Endarno story arc, the Oracle is deposed by the devious Phobos, who has assumed his friend Endarno's identity. After he is stripped of his name and position as the Oracle and banished to Basilíade, he experiences mortality. This experience makes him more friendly towards the Guardians after his reinstatement. When he fails to defeat the Dark Mother, he steps down as Oracle and gives the title to Yan Lin, who recognized the threat. In the arc Magical Sovereigns, Himerish returns to Kandrakar to celebrate with the Guardians after they become Magical Sovereigns.
- Yan Lin – Hay Lin's grandmother, a previous W.I.T.C.H. member and a member of the council. She is wise and perceptive, offering advice to the girls. She was the previous Guardian of Air and the only ex-Guardian to remain faithful to the Oracle. In her last days on Earth, Yan Lin assisted her granddaughter and her friends with their magical powers and gave them the Heart of Kandrakar. Yan Lin later dies and enters the halls of Kandrakar to join the Oracle's council. At the end of the New Power arc, Yan Lin becomes the new Oracle.
- Halinor – see below
- Tibor is the first Oracle's faithful advisor. He has served the Oracle for centuries.

==== Minor Members ====
- Bolgo is an elfin old man who plans strategy during the final battle against Phobos. He also discusses the Oracle's decision to simply wait and see "how events unfold" with other Council members, including Luba and Althor.
- Althor is an old man who resembles an elf or a dwarf who first appears asking the Oracle who should be the new Guardians. He also participates in the battle against Phobos.
- As-Sharwa is one of the oldest and wisest of Kandrakar and the elected Voice of the Congregation. He has an elongated forehead tattooed with mystical runes. Representing the council, he informs the Oracle that the Congregation does not wish to use the destructive power of the Resonance to counteract Nerissa's attacks on Kandrakar.

=== The Board of Northern Lords ===
- Board of Northern Lords – Governing board of an independent, cold and mountainous country north of Meridian. These elderly gentlemen have a powerful army of humans. When Elyon unwittingly unleashes a war council, the Guardians side with the Lords.
- Lord Regnar is one of the youngest councillors who helps W.I.T.C.H and is committed to preserving peace.
- Lord Balder is the Lord Supreme of the Board. Usually compels unanimous decisions, yet when settlers arrive does not hesitate to send an emissary. He is a great friend of Lord Regnar.

=== Former Guardians of the Veil ===
The original five Guardians of the Veil many decades before W.I.T.C.H. Their first initials make up the word C.H.Y.K.N. (pronounced "Chicken"):

- Cassidy is a russet-haired woman and original Guardian of Water. Cassidy's star appeared at Will's birth, and she eventually makes a spiritual connection with Will. Cassidy was a caring woman who was close to her mother. She was entrusted with the Heart of Kandrakar, but was later killed by Nerissa in retaliation, being pushed off Mount Thanos.
- Halinor is a blonde woman and original Guardian of Fire, now deceased. She kept a diary that told of the Star of Cassidy. Like Kadma, Halinor was banished from Kandrakar for questioning the Oracle. She was a founding member of the Rising Star Foundation. Before she died she was best friends with Kadma. Halinor was kindhearted, although she could be aggressive and insecure.
- Yan Lin – See above
- Kadma is the original Guardian of Earth. She and Halinor were banished from Kandrakar for questioning the Oracle when Nerissa killed Cassidy. She secretly guides Will through the Rising Star Foundation until Will moves to Heatherfield and becomes a Guardian. She later helps Will by giving her Halinor's diary. Kadma resides on Earth. She still has her powers.
- Nerissa (see also below) – The original keeper of the Heart of Kandrakar and Guardian of Quintessence, the fifth element. She was gradually consumed by the Heart's power and turned against her fellow Guardians. Enraged that the Oracle had given the Heart of Kandrakar to Cassidy, she murdered her fellow Guardian. Nerissa was imprisoned in a cave on Mount Thanos and would never be released until "the five powers were united." Nerissa planned to steal the Heart from Will at any cost.

== Villains ==
=== Part I Villains ===
- Prince Phobos Escanor (originally known as "Prince Phobos Portrait") is the Prince of Meridian, who rules his world while searching for his sister Elyon (rightful heir to the throne) to absorb her powers. He is immortal, possibly thousands of years old. Phobos plans to use Elyon and the Heart of Kandrakar to destroy the veil sealing him within Meridian and spread his life-absorbing powers to other worlds. His motives are exposed and after a climactic battle with his sister and the Guardians, Phobos is defeated. Elyon succeeded the throne. He is named after Phobos, the Greek god of fear.
- Lord Cedric is a general of Phobos' army who can transform into a snake-like creature. In this form, Cedric can slither up mountains, shoot energy blasts, raise magical barriers, trap others in impenetrable bubbles, disrupt memories, and use telekinesis. He is entrusted with the task of apprehending the rebel Caleb and finding Elyon on Earth, opening a book shop under the identity Cedric Hoffman. Despite his orders to deceive Elyon, he feels affection for her. He falls in love with the warrior Orube, but dies shortly afterwards when he sacrifices himself to save her from Johnathan Ludmoore.
- Elyon (originally "Elyon Portrait") is Cornelia's childhood friend in Heatherfield, who is really Phobos' long-lost sister, destined to become the Light of Meridian. Phobos eventually reveals her true heritage and abducts her to claim her power. Thanks to his lies, Elyon gets the impression the Guardians are the enemies at the beginning. In time she sees the truth, and in a climactic battle with her brother she is restored to the throne and renews her friendship with W.I.T.C.H. She rules over Meridian, with Vathek (and later Caleb) as her advisors.
- Vathek is a blue-skinned denizen of Meridian. Originally Cedric's henchman, Vathek turns against him and joins the Meridian rebel army with Caleb. He becomes a close friend to W.I.T.C.H. Following Phobo's defeat, he is one of Elyon's trusted confidants.
- Frost the Hunter – Foremost among Phobos' warriors and a formidable tracker, Frost had never lost a battle before falling to the Guardians. Frost swears revenge against them. He rides a green rhinoceros-like mount named Crimson and wields a blade that can deflect spells and fire blasts at his opponents. When the Veil is lowered, he finds himself in Heatherfield. He takes the opportunity to take revenge, but the Guardians outwit Frost, who is imprisoned in the Tower of Mists.

=== Part II Villains ===
- Nerissa (see also above) is the previous keeper of the Heart of Kandrakar, who was consumed by the immense power the Heart gave her and eventually began to descend into evil. She is sentenced to be sealed in a coffin located in Mount Thanos until the Aurameres are joined. Luba, who is convinced that the girls are unworthy of their status as Guardians, helps free her. Nerissa creates the Four Knights of Revenge and, after capturing Caleb, she declares war on Kandrakar. In issue 22, she is destroyed by W.I.T.C.H.
- Shagon, the Hate is a demon wearing a blue metal vest bearing Nerissa's seal. He has a tail that can be used as a weapon. His hair resembles a nest of snakes, giving him a Medusa-like appearance. As a human, he works as a geologist doing research near Mount Thanos. While searching for his lost dog Miska, he encounters Nerissa, who wants a human as "material" for her right-hand man. Shagon represents Nerissa's hatred for Kandrakar and feeds on expressions of hate. His life essence is nearly absorbed by Nerissa in the final battle, but he wounds her and reverts to his original form.
- Khor, the Destroyer is one of the Four Knights of Revenge and the first to encounter the Guardians. He used to be the dog Miska before Nerissa transformed him into a purple-skinned humanoid who carries a pair of massive cleavers. He represents Nerissa's anger. Even in this form, Khor still has the qualities of a loyal dog, sensing a bond with his former master, Shagon. Khor is nearly absorbed by Nerissa, but reverts to his original dog form.
- Ember, the Pain is one of the Four Knights of Revenge, created by Nerissa. Ember was created from the lava that flowed around Nerissa's tomb and is made of smoldering lava, with bat-like wings and hair made of flames. Befitting her nature, she attacks her foes with blazing hot beams from her weapon – a trident. She is absorbed by Nerissa in the final battle.
- Tridart, the Despair is one of the Four Knights of Revenge, created by Nerrisa. Tridart was made from icy stalactites found in the cave where Nerissa was sealed. His form is that of a bald, muscular man with large, angel-like wings. His weapon of choice is a short, double-edged axe. He represents the despair Nerissa felt in her prison and is absorbed by Nerissa in the final battle.
- Luba is the first Protector of the Aurameres, Luba is a Cat-Woman and a member of Congregation of Kandrakar. Luba dislikes the Oracle's decision to grant Guardianship to young, inexperienced Earth teenagers. She causes trouble for the girls by fusing the Aurameres together on purpose, awakening Nerissa. Luba eventually redeems herself by sacrificing her immortality to save the Guardians and Caleb.

=== Part III Villains ===
- Ari is a young farmer in the world of Arkhanta who struggles to make ends meet. His wife, Jamayeda, died giving birth to their son, Maqui, who was born mute and sick. In an attempt to heal his son, Ari captures a banshee named Yua to force three wishes from her in return for her freedom. Unable to fulfill his wish, Yua instead helps him to claim rulership over Arkanta, but instead of releasing her, Ari uses his last wish to bind Yua as his eternal servant. While doing his best to improve the lot of the common man, Ari declares war on the Oracle when he refuses to aid him in curing his son, but in the end regains his senses with help from the Guardians.
- Yua is the mightiest banshee on Arkanta. Tied into eternal servitude by Ari, Yua's hatred grows in captivity. She plots against Ari by fanning his paranoia against the Guardians and Kandrakar. Eventually her plans come to naught, but due to the efforts of W.I.T.C.H. and because she has come to love Maqui like her own son, Yua lets go of revenge.
- Raphael "Ralph" Sylla is an Interpol detective who specializes in supernatural phenomena. He stumbles upon a report from an officer in Green Bay, concerning Khor, the Knight of Revenge. The names of the five W.I.T.C.H. girls grab his attention. To observe the girls he gets a job as computer science teacher at the Sheffield Institute. He soon discovers he is on the right track. When he joins the student's exchange course he follows Taranee, Cornelia and Hay Lin. Sylla's cover is blown when Taranee defends Hay Lin's Astral Drop against him. His suspicions are confirmed and the girls become his enemies. Later he is pushed aside by his superiors. As revenge, he warns the girls about the threat to them. In the end, he and his colleagues' memories of W.I.T.C.H. are erased by the Oracle.
- Dr. Theodore Riddle is an elite psychic detective that is brought in to combat the W.I.T.C.H. girls when their supernatural secret is exposed to the government. Although his skills are impressive, ranging from mind control to telepathy, he is not powerful enough to combat W.I.T.C.H. directly. He carries a handgun because of his motto "bullets are always faster than the mind." He collaborates with Interpol's goal to study the W.I.T.C.H. girls, but he seems to have his own agenda. The Oracle later removes his memories of the girls.
- Astral Will, Irma, Taranee, Cornelia, and Hay Lin – Originally thought to be mere substitutes, the Astral Drops develop personalities and grow tired of their treatment by the girls, who only call upon them when they need chores done or to take their place when they go on a mission. They start causing problems for the girls on Earth, such as turning friends and family against them. Eventually, however, they are released from servitude and granted new identities.
- Thomas Vandom is Will's biological father, a businessman who suffers from a ruthless win-or-lose drive that often gets him into trouble. For this reason, Susan Vandom separated from him before the start of the series, but Thomas rejects a divorce since he counts on her unwilling financial support. To this end, he gives her the choice of either paying him or losing guardianship over Will in court, but with ex-Guardian Kadma's help the crisis is averted and Vandom departs.
- Mark Zibosky is an infamous extortionist and criminal. He once held Jewell's friend Benjamin Crane hostage. He tries to escape, but is confronted by the Guardians and later apprehended.

=== Part IV Villains ===
- Endarno is a member of the Council of Kandrakar and a former warrior and close friend of the Oracle. He is possessed by Phobos, who attempts to free himself and seize the power of Kandrakar by making the Council banish the old Oracle. After a struggle, the minds of Phobos and Endarno return to their respective bodies. Once Phobos is defeated, Himerish is restored to his old title, and Endarno becomes an ally of W.I.T.C.H.
- Vaal is Endarno's loyal servant and a denizen of Meridian who unknowingly helps Phobos in his plans, believing he serves Endarno. He does not understand why Endarno wants Elyon to abdicate. His name is based on the ancient near-eastern god of fertility, vegetation and weather, Baal.

=== Part V Villains ===
- Johnathan Ludmoore is the first Meridianite to travel to Earth. Phobos orders him to weaken the Veil by opening portals to enable travel between the two dimensions. He discovers that Heatherfield lies in a place where the five elements meet and tries to suppress them. When he fails, he disappears into his magic book of the five elements. When Cedric finds the book, Ludmoore uses him as a henchman to gather the five missing stones, representing the parts of the elements he could not suppress. When finished, he traps the Guardians, Orube, and Cedric, in the book. The Guardians defeat Ludmoore after Cedric uses his own death as a means to open a portal out of the book.

=== Part VI Villains ===
- Tecla Ibsen is an old woman obsessed with regaining her youth who can absorb the vital energies of her victims. She sees the Guardians as rich sources of vital energy. After a final battle with Folkner, she and her husband Karl are welcomed into Kandrakar by the Oracle and allowed to stay.
- Edward Folkner is the new doctor in the Sheffield Institute. He merges with the monsters trapped inside his magic box to drain the energy of every human being on Earth, but is defeated by W.I.T.C.H.

=== Part VII Villains ===
- Dark Mother is the Elemental Queen of Earth. Dark Mother used to be Meter, the Queen of Spring, but she uses her magic to transform herself into a monster, calling herself Dark Mother. The other Elemental Queens of Water, Fire, and Air fight and defeat her by banishing her beneath the woods of Heatherfield, trapped in a giant tree, though she can extend her roots through the earth to gather information. Her bonds are later accidentally broken by Will. After she escapes from her prison, Dark Mother infiltrates Kandrakar, turning it into her kingdom with the Oracle and the Elders under her control, save for Yan Lin. In the end, the girls defeat her by sealing her in a stone tomb. Although Dark Mother is sealed away, her roots still threaten the foundation of Kandrakar.
- Romur is a servant of Dark Mother along with his non-human brothers. Although he appears to be loyal to Dark Mother, deep down he is terrified and resents her. Romur helps Dark Mother by sending her monsters to fight against W.I.T.C.H. when they try to find the roots of their new powers. Later he betrays Dark Mother by helping the W.I.T.C.H. girls return to Kandrakar and fight against Dark Mother.

=== Part VIII Villains ===
- Professor Takeda is a cryogenics specialist who opens a gateway to another world. When his older daughter Mariko discovers this, she ends up in a coma, with her mind dwelling in another dimension called the Fast Realm. Because of this tragedy, Takeda becomes an evil scientist conspiring to destroy everything magical, including the Guardians; he enlists help from a boy named Liam, who came from the alternate realm and was Mariko's first love. However, when his neglected younger daughter Shinobu betrays him, Takeda gradually returns to his senses and is reunited with his daughters.
- Arkaam, the White Queen is the malevolent and despotic ruler of the Fast World. She desires to kill Mariko and the Guardians. She kills Liam when he tries to rescue Mariko and attempts to claim the Earth as part of her realm, but is destroyed by W.I.T.C.H.
- Liam – Professor Takeda's hitman and right hand man. He comes from the Fast World to help Takeda bring Mariko, whom he loves, back to life and to spy on the Guardians. He is later sent to kidnap William (Will's younger brother) and take him to the Fast Realm, but because William trusts him, Liam cannot harm him. Liam later aids W.I.T.C.H. in locating William and the Takeda sisters, but is murdered by the White Queen.

=== Part IX Villains ===
- The Runics are five magical boys who control the elements just like the Guardians, though they use their powers for evil. Their captain is Nashter, who rules energy. Darmon rules fire, Shalin rules air, Cromo rules earth and Ran-rah rules water.
- Nihila – As Queen of the Loom, Nihila rules over the signs of the Zodiac. She uses the zodiac (except for Libra) to sow chaos around the Guardians, but is defeated by Hay Lin.
- Orristurr – King of the Sharks, he invades the territory of Wishstarr, King of the Starfish, whom he imprisons. Orristurr wants to marry Wishstarr's daughter, Mareeve, but she escapes to the surface. She then lives on land, carrying the name Mary for two hundred years. Orristurr is defeated by Mareeve and Irma.

=== Part X Villains ===
- Lady Giga – Youngest of the three ladies. She can absorb any type of energy.
- Lady Crash – Middle sister of the three ladies, who has the power to control motorized vehicles. She turns into a car and captures Cornelia in order to drain W.I.T.C.H. of their powers. However, Cornelia escapes and leads her on a chase which drains her gasoline reserves, leaving her starving and helpless.
- Lady Kimikal is the strongest and the oldest of the three ladies. She drains the W.I.T.C.H. girls of their powers, but her greed leads to an overload of magic which kills her.

== Other characters ==
=== Recurring characters ===
- Uriah Dunn, Kurt Van Buren, and Laurent Hampton are the three bullies at Heatherfield High who love to cause trouble. Nigel was part of their gang until leaving to continue a relationship with Taranee.
- Bess and Courtney Grumper are the scandalous sisters and the writers of the gossip section of the Sheffield Institute's newspaper. They love to ridicule and get people in trouble to see their reactions, but the W.I.T.C.H. girls – and especially Cornelia and Hay Lin – are their favorite targets.
- Dean Collins is a history teacher at Sheffield Institute. During the first story arc, he dates Will's mother, Susan, and after a while wins Will's acceptance; in the fifth arc, he marries Susan, becoming Will's stepfather. Collins is considerate, always thinking of his students and trying to help them, but he also tends to overreact. In issue 108, he reveals to Will that he was a lead singer in a band called Greensuit, and after losing a record she bought, he gives her a complete record collection.
- William Collins is Will's half-brother and is introduced into the story during part seven; he is usually called "Will", much to his sister's frustration. William proves to be magical from the first day of his life; his powers include creating floating bubbles to play in, enlarging his milk bottle for more milk, conjuring up astral butterflies, and bringing plushies to life. He can read the minds of animals and humans. He can sense negative energies in others. Will is the only one who he shows his powers to. Will tries to teach him how to keep his powers under control while teaching others at the magic school in the Teach 2b W.I.T.C.H. saga.
- Grandmother Hale is Harold Hale's mother and Cornelia's grandmother. From time to time she visits the Hale family, who welcome her with mixed feelings. She is respected as an older family member, but hated for her high-strung, aloof opinions on her son's family.
- Lilian Hale is Cornelia's younger sister by about six years. She has a pet cat named Napoleon, originally a gift from Will to Cornelia.
- Kandor – Appears at the start of the eighth saga. When the girls come to Yan Lin about the growing number of magical people in Heatherfield, Kandor is assigned to the Teach 2b W.I.T.C.H. school. He also keeps the bus/magic-school in check, and travels the world looking for potential students and procuring materials for his secret hobby, knitting. He is in a relationship with Margeret Hope at the end of issue 101. The girls have to convince Margeret to believe in magic again to return her Raising Star, the essence of her magic, which she abandoned after her first love moved away. The girls were failing until Kandor arrived and the two quickly fall in love, which causes the star to return. He has the power to read the minds of others – only the surface of what they are currently thinking – and is kind-hearted.
- We, Ew and Boring are a trio of Basiliade pets; white fur with plush-ball tails and the power to become invisible. Their names are due to the pattern on the bottoms of their feet that resemble the letters "W" and "E". We appeared at the end of the fourth arc and Ew early on in the ninth. We prefers to play with the girls when he feels like it, causing some mischief for them. Ew looks like We, but she has a small pink purse and sports short purple hair. She is constantly trying to kiss We, which he allows out of guilt from her crying. Boring is We's cousin who sports purple hair and according to We, he is called Boring because he is always bored. Sometimes We carries a small briefcase with him, from which he can take objects much larger than himself. We has also the capability of flying, using blue miniature wings.

=== Other characters ===
- Agent Maria Medina is an Interpol agent from the crime psychology department who is assigned to investigate the Brown family's disappearance. She believes that Will and her friends know something about Elyon's family that they are not sharing and decides to keep an eye on them. At the end of the first arc, she and her partner conclude that Elyon and her family are "illegal aliens" – not realizing how close they are to the truth. Near the end of the third arc, the Oracle removes the knowledge of the girls from Medina's mind.
- Agent Joel McTiennan is another Interpol agent who investigates the Brown family's disappearance with Medina. He is a quiet guy who thinks that Agent Medina's theories are off-the-wall and that the case is a dead end. McTiennan and Medina are affectionately referred to as "Big Guy and Small Fry" by their colleagues. Near the end of the third arc, the Oracle removes the knowledge of the girls from McTiennan's mind.
- Orube is a warrior of Basiliade, like the Oracle Himerish. She was the apprentice of Luba, the former Guardian of the Aurameres, and is introduced in the beginning of the third arc. Orube is a skilled warrior who finds Earth customs difficult to understand. Orube temporarily fills Taranee's place as Guardian. As she continues to fight with the girls, she admits that she blames them for her master's death at the hands of Nerrissa. The girls change her view of them as she stays in Heatherfield trying to be more human, and she accepts the girls as her friends. Orube leaves for Basiliade after Cedric dies to save her at the end of the Ludmoore arc.
- Yarr is a Commander from Basilíade who meets the banished Oracle (Himerish) while traveling with his minions, Kilubi and Ih-Sui. He recognizes him from the past as a battle partner. Now he serves Himerish loyally.
- Kilubi is the feisty and colder minion of Yarr. She has dark purple hair and pointed elfin ears. She has red paint around her eyes, appears somewhat tomboyish, with a gold breastplate and shoulder plates as her battle attire. Her weapon is a sword.
- Ih-Sui is the calmer and tranquil minion of Yarr. She hardly talks. She has dark purple hair and wields a sword. Her battle attire is a Chinese suit with long, wide sleeves.
- Shinobu is the younger daughter of Takeda. Because of her dad's obsession with Mariko, she feels lonely and left out. She finds William when she enters the Fast World. Later, Shinobu reveals that she has the ability to turn invisible.
- Mariko is the older daughter of Takeda who discovers a parallel dimension and is sent into a magical slumber; her body is left floating in a tank full of liquid in Takeda's laboratory. She battles the ruler of the strange dimension as the Black Queen, until the W.I.T.C.H. girls are fooled by the White Queen into attacking her, imprisoning her with Shinobu and William. In the Fast World, she meets Liam and the two of them fall in love.
