= Tom Carnegie =

Motorsports announcer (1919–2011)

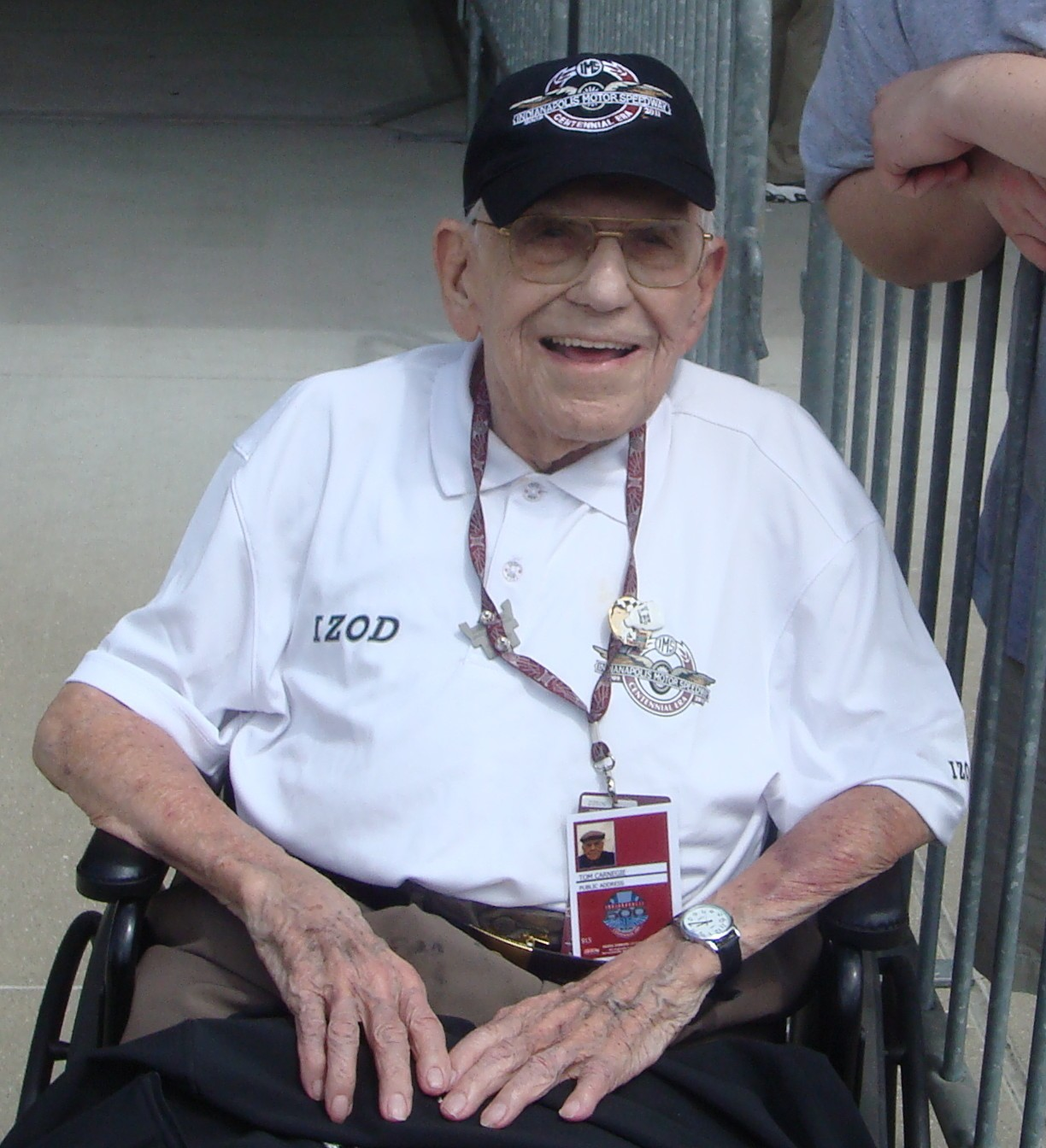
- Carnegie in 2010
- Born: Carl Kenagy; September 25, 1919; Norwalk, Connecticut, U.S.
- Died: February 11, 2011 (aged 91); Zionsville, Indiana, U.S.
- Education: William Jewell College
- Occupations: Public-Address Announcer, Sports Broadcaster
- Years active: 1942–2006
- Known for: Indianapolis Motor Speedway Public Address Announcer

Tom Carnegie, born Carl Lee Kenagy, (September 25, 1919 – February 11, 2011) was an American radio and television broadcaster, public-address announcer, sports columnist, documentary filmmaker, and educator from Norwalk, Connecticut. Carnegie's radio and television broadcasting career, which spanned from 1942 to 1985, included work at KITE radio in Kansas City, Missouri; WOWO (AM) radio in Fort Wayne, Indiana; and WIRE (AM) radio in Indianapolis, Indiana. Carnegie was also sports director for WRTV television in Indianapolis for thirty-two years, and broadcast the Indiana high school boys' basketball tournament for twenty-four years.

Carnegie is best known for his deep and resonant voice as the public-address announcer from 1946 to 2006 for the Indianapolis Motor Speedway, which earned him the title of the "Voice of the Speedway." Carnegie's signature calls during the Indianapolis 500-mile race qualifying attempts were "He's on it" and "It's a new track record," which he repeated many times during his six decades as the Speedway's public address announcer.

== Early life and education ==
Born Carl Lee Kenagy on September 25, 1919, in Norwalk, Connecticut, his father, a Baptist minister, moved the family to Waterloo, Iowa, and Pontiac, Michigan. While living in Waterloo, Iowa, he listened to radio broadcasts of a young Ronald Reagan and credits Reagan with being one of his main broadcasting inspirations and influences. When Carl was still a boy the Kenagy family settled in Raytown, Missouri, near Kansas City.

During his high school years in Missouri, Carl wanted to be an athlete. He excelled in several sports, including football and basketball, but baseball was his favorite. Carl's interest in playing sports shifted to other activities after he contracted a polio-related virus before his senior year in high school. The illness affected the strength in his legs for the remainder of his life and caused him to begin training his voice for a career in broadcasting. Carl entered extemporaneous speech and debate competitions while still in high school, and won an American Legion oratorical contest during his senior year.

Carl continued his voice training while attending William Jewell College, a four-year liberal arts college in Liberty, Missouri, ten miles northeast of Kansas City. As a college student he majored in theater, was on the school's debate team and worked part-time at KITE radio station in Kansas City, his first radio job. Carl also did public-address announcements at the college's ball games. He graduated from college in 1942.

== Early career ==
After graduating from college in 1942, Carl took a job at WOWO (AM) radio in Fort Wayne, Indiana. That same year, Eldon Campbell, the station's program manager, persuaded Carl to change his on-air name to Tom Carnegie because he thought it sounded better. Carnegie continued to use the on-air name for the remainder of his broadcasting career, but he never changed it to his legal name. At the Fort Wayne station Carnegie worked as a staff announcer, covered sporting events, including broadcasts of Fort Wayne Pistons games, and did a few comedy programs before taking a job in Indianapolis, Indiana.

In 1945, Carnegie moved to Indianapolis, where he became sports director at WIRE (AM) radio. The station was owned by Eugene S. Pulliam, who also owned the Indianapolis Star. In addition to his radio broadcasts, Carnegie wrote a sports column for Pulliam's newspaper.

== Television broadcaster ==
In 1953, Carnegie became sports director for WFBM-TV, later known as WRTV (Channel 6), in Indianapolis. He remained at the station for thirty-two years, retiring in 1985. Carnegie is best known for initiating WRTV's broadcasts of daily trackside reports of the Indianapolis 500-mile race during the month of May. WRTV also aired one-hour broadcasts with Carnegie as the program's announcer on each of the four qualifying days in May.

In addition to his work at the Speedway, Carnegie's other assignments for the Indianapolis television station included covering the 1964 Summer Olympics in Tokyo, Japan, and the 1968 Summer Olympics in Mexico City, Mexico. In the late 1960s he also covered the first U.S. Auto Club-sanctioned race outside the United States. Carnegie retired from WRTV in 1985, but continued his work at the Indianapolis Motor Speedway until 2006.

== Indianapolis Motor Speedway announcer ==
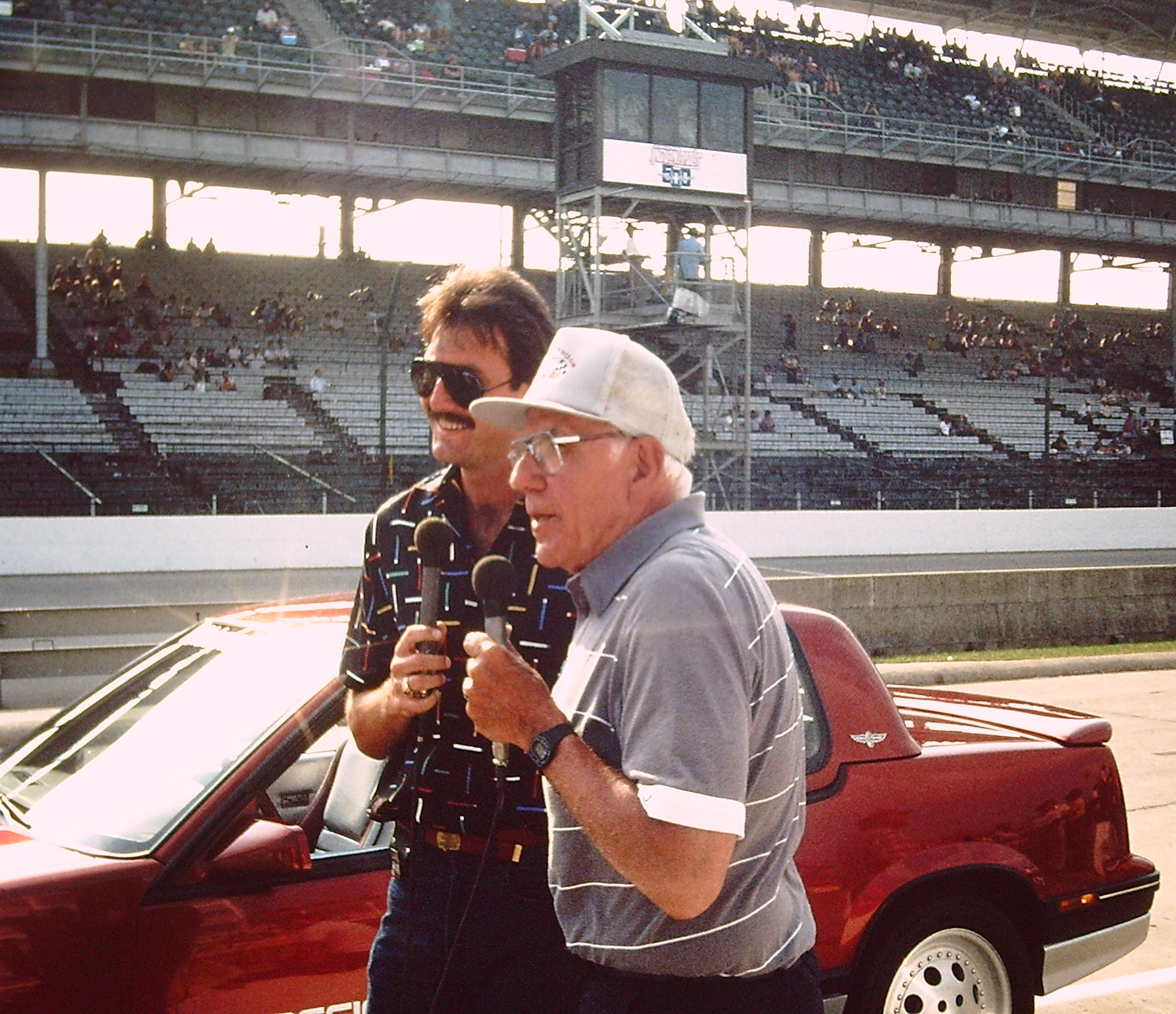
Carnegie at the 1985 Indianapolis 500

Carnegie was the public-address announcer for the Indianapolis Motor Speedway from 1946 until his retirement in 2006. Carnegie's six decades of service in that capacity earned him the title the "Voice of the Speedway." Carnegie called sixty-one Indianapolis 500-mile races and six Grand Prix races during his tenure at the Speedway.

Carnegie got his start at the Speedway in 1946. Three-time Indianapolis 500 winner Wilbur Shaw, who was involved in helping revive the auto race on Memorial Day weekend, first heard Carnegie's voice in 1945, when Carnegie was announcing an antique car show in Indianapolis. Shaw urged Tony Hulman, the new Speedway owner, to hire Carnegie as the lead public-address announcer for the 500-mile auto race in May 1946, the first one held after its temporary suspension during World War II.

At that time Carnegie, who knew nothing about auto racing, had no advance preparation for the event. All he had was a list of drivers and the numbers of their racecars. As with all the other spectators, Carnegie could not see the entire 2.5 miles (4.0 km) of the oval track. He later remarked: "I had never seen such a crowd, let alone a 500-Mile Race" and "it took me ten to fifteen years to have any confidence that what I was saying was right." Carnegie remained the Speedway's announcer for six decades. His signature phrases were "Annnd heeee's on it!" as a driver would come down the Speedway's front stretch to take the green flag, which signaled the start of the driver's qualifying four-lap run, and reported especially fast laps in qualifying efforts with "Listen to this one, fans, you won't believe this!" followed by his favorite line, "It's a neeeeeww track record!" Tony Stewart once remarked: "You take him and put him on a microphone at a race track and if you know anything about racing, you know who that is on the other end of the microphone." Later in life Carnegie acknowledged, "I'm on the P.A. to inform," but he also wanted to create excitement for the fans, and considered his broadcasts as "speed theater."

During his years as the Speedway's announcer, Carnegie witnessed and reported many changes, including the introduction of new technology and real-time, electronic updates of race events that eventually decreased the fans' reliance on Carnegie's announcements. He was also on hand to witness many Speedway firsts including the debut in 1977 of Janet Guthrie, the first woman driver at the Indianapolis 500-mile race, and the introduction of NASCAR events at the Speedway with the debut of the Brickyard 400 in 1994, among others. The last time race fans heard Carnegie say "It's a new track record!" during qualifications was for driver Arie Luyendyk in May 1996. Carnegie retired from his work at the Speedway in 2006.

Carnegie was inducted into the Motorsports Hall of Fame of America in 2006.

== Basketball tournament announcer ==
Although Carnegie is renowned for his work as the Speedway's announcer, he is also famous in Indiana for his announcing the Indiana high school boys' basketball tournament, which he began broadcasting on television in 1953. Carnegie later commented about his first experience with Hoosier Hysteria: "I had no idea what I was getting into. I'd never seen anything like it." He broadcast the state high school boys' basketball championships for twenty-four years. During that time Carnegie paired with Howdie Bell, and for more than twenty years with Butler University coach Paul D. "Tony" Hinkle for broadcasts of the tournament.

Carnegie's later acknowledged his all-time favorite sporting event broadcasts were the 1954, 1955, and 1956 Indiana high school boys' basketball tournaments. Carnegie was the game announcer for the 1954 tournament at Hinkle Fieldhouse on the Butler University campus, where the Milan High School team upset Muncie Central High School to win the state championship. The game and Bobby Plump's buzzer-beating shot were the inspiration for the film Hoosiers (1986). Carnegie was also the announcer for Crispus Attucks High School's back-to-back wins in 1955 and 1956 with future Hall of Famer Oscar Robertson.

== Educator ==
In addition to broadcasting, Carnegie was a part-time instructor at Butler University. He began teaching in 1949, chaired the school's radio department, and directed its radio station, WAJC, until his departure in 1953 to become sports director for WFBM television in Indianapolis. Howdy Bell, Carnegie's former student and later his television partner for broadcasts of Indiana's high school boys' basketball tournament, explained that Carnegie "knew exactly how to build excitement among the spectators and the TV audience."

== Filmmaker and author ==
In 1965, following Jim Clark's win at the Indianapolis 500-mile race, Carnegie and a crew traveled to Scotland to film a documentary called The Flying Scot, which Carnegie produced and narrated. The documentary was the "first driver-feature shown on national television in the United States" (on ABC Sports); it also aired on the BBC in Great Britain.

Carnegie made a brief appearance in the film Hoosiers (1986), where he portrayed the announcer for the film's climactic championship game. The scenes were shot on location at Hinkle Fieldhouse on Butler campus in Indianapolis, where Carnegie announced Milan High School's upset of Muncie Central in the 1954 state championship game.

Carnegie appears as himself in three ESPN SportsCentury television documentaries: "A. J. Foyt," (2001) "Rick Mears," (2001) and "Al Unser Sr." (2002).

== Community service ==
Carnegie helped establish the Indiana Basketball Hall of Fame in New Castle, Indiana; it is the only statewide basketball hall of fame in the United States with a permanent facility. He also assisted in launching New Castle's annual Hall of Fame Classic basketball game.

== Later years ==
In his later years, Carnegie acknowledged his favorite Indianapolis 500 drivers were Jim Clark, the subject of Carnegie's documentary film in 1965, and Eddie Sachs, who was killed in a crash during the Indianapolis 500-mile race in 1964. Carnegie also recalled that the 1973 race was the "most emotionally shattering" for him. That May the race was held over three days due to bad weather and two drivers were killed: Art Pollard (during practice) and Swede Savage (from injuries during the race). By 2007 Carnegie had spoken at the memorial services of twenty-four racecar drivers.

=== Death and legacy ===
As Carnegie grew older, mobility in his legs became more difficult. He died on February 11, 2011, at age 91. A memorial event was held at the Indianapolis Motor Speedway Hall of Fame Museum following his death.

Carnegie was known for his deep, rich, and "almost thundering voice." He was also known for his wit and rapport with the sports personalities he interviewed. As former Indianapolis 500-mile auto racer Johnny Rutherford described Carnegie's broadcasts: "The delivery, the way Tom said them, his timing on everything was impeccable." For many, Carnegie's presences at the Speedway was a sixty-year tradition. Indianapolis Motor Speedway historian Donald Davidson suggested that "no single individual had more to do with the growth of qualifications during the month of May" than Carnegie. Mari Hulman George, Indianapolis Motor Speedway Corporation's chairman of the board at the time of Carnegie's death, also commented: "Millions of race fans who never met Tom still felt as if they knew him because of his distinctive voice and his passion for the Speedway, its events, and its people."

== Personal life ==
Carl and his wife Dorothy Jean (D. J.) had three children: two sons, Robert and Blair; and a daughter, Charlotte.

== Works ==
=== Books ===
- Indy 500: More than a Race (1987)

=== Film and television ===
- The Flying Scot (1965) – as producer and narrator.
- Hoosiers (1986) – a cameo appearance.
- ESPN SportsCentury documentaries: "A. J. Foyt," (2001) "Rick Mears," (2001) and "Al Unser Sr." (2002) – as himself.
