= Milan, Indiana =

- Town
- Town of Milan
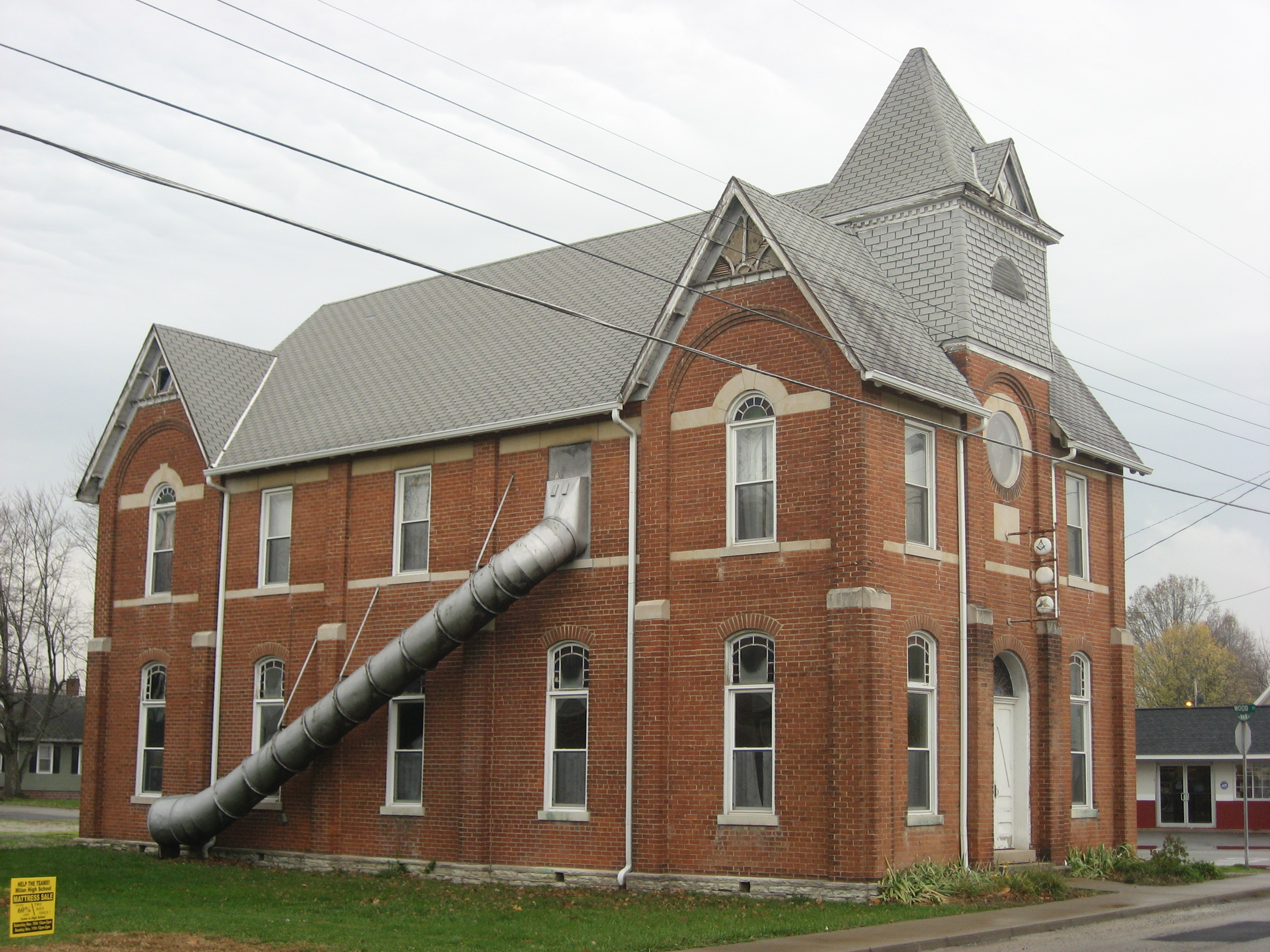
- Milan's historic Masonic lodge building

- Location of Milan in Ripley County, Indiana.
- Coordinates: 39°7′22″N 85°07′40″W
- Country: United States
- State: Indiana
- County: Ripley
- Townships: Franklin, Washington

Area
  - Total: 2.02 sq mi (5.24 km^{2})
  - Land: 1.99 sq mi (5.15 km^{2})
  - Water: 0.035 sq mi (0.09 km^{2})
- Elevation: 981 ft (299 m)

Population (2020)
  - Total: 1,823
  - Density: 916.1/sq mi (353.71/km^{2})
- Time zone: UTC-5 (Eastern (EST))
  - Summer (DST): UTC-4 (EDT)
- ZIP code: 47031
- Area code: 812 & 930
- FIPS code: 18-49266
- GNIS feature ID: 2396761
- Website: www.milan-in-gov.net

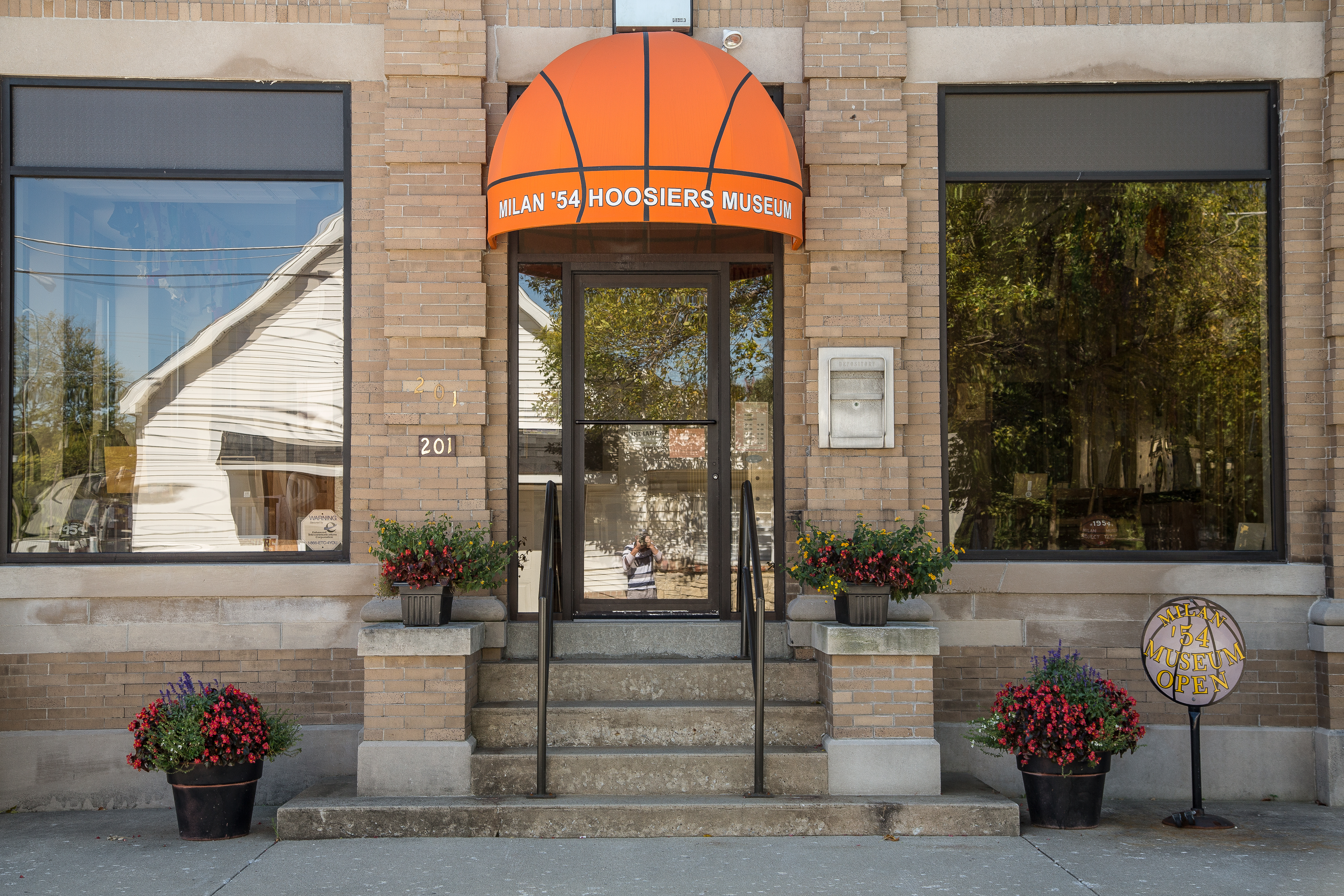
Photo from Small Town Indiana photo survey

Milan (/ˈmaɪlɪn/ MY-lin) is a town in Franklin and Washington townships, Ripley County, in the U.S. state of Indiana. As of the 2020 census, Milan had a population of 1,823.

Milan High School won the Indiana state basketball championship against Muncie Central High School in 1954, the victory being significant as Milan was one of the smallest towns to win a state championship in the United States at that time. The 1986 film Hoosiers is based on the story of the 1954 Milan Team.

While it is often claimed that Milan is the subject of a volume of poetry, titled Pop. 359, written in 1941 by Carl Wilson under the pseudonym of Tramp Starr, that book is actually about the nearby town of Moores Hill.

== History ==
Milan was laid out in 1854 when the railroad was extended to that point. The town, like its predecessor Old Milan, was named after Milan in Italy.

Milan Masonic Lodge No. 31 was listed on the National Register of Historic Places in 2013.

== Geography ==
Milan is located in Southeast Indiana about an hour West of Cincinnati. According to the 2010 census, Milan has a total area of 1.98 square miles (5.13 km^{2}), of which 1.95 square miles (5.05 km^{2}) (or 98.48%) is land and 0.03 square miles (0.08 km^{2}) (or 1.52%) is water.

== Demographics ==
Historical population
Census	Pop.	Note	%±
1880	106		—
1890	318		200.0%
1900	422		32.7%
1910	557		32.0%
1920	718		28.9%
1930	877		22.1%
1940	1,000		14.0%
1950	1,014		1.4%
1960	1,174		15.8%
1970	1,260		7.3%
1980	1,566		24.3%
1990	1,529		−2.4%
2000	1,816		18.8%
2010	1,899		4.6%
2020	1,823		−4.0%
U.S. Decennial Census

=== 2020 census ===
As of the 2020 census, Milan had a population of 1,823. The median age was 40.2 years. 22.1% of residents were under the age of 18 and 23.3% of residents were 65 years of age or older. For every 100 females there were 83.6 males, and for every 100 females age 18 and over there were 79.9 males age 18 and over.

0.0% of residents lived in urban areas, while 100.0% lived in rural areas.

There were 729 households in Milan, of which 34.3% had children under the age of 18 living in them. Of all households, 39.0% were married-couple households, 16.0% were households with a male householder and no spouse or partner present, and 31.4% were households with a female householder and no spouse or partner present. About 28.3% of all households were made up of individuals and 17.1% had someone living alone who was 65 years of age or older.

There were 798 housing units, of which 8.6% were vacant. The homeowner vacancy rate was 2.1% and the rental vacancy rate was 8.7%.

Racial composition as of the 2020 census
Race	Number	Percent
White	1,705	93.5%
Black or African American	9	0.5%
American Indian and Alaska Native	0	0.0%
Asian	13	0.7%
Native Hawaiian and Other Pacific Islander	0	0.0%
Some other race	6	0.3%
Two or more races	90	4.9%
Hispanic or Latino (of any race)	13	0.7%

=== 2010 census ===
As of the 2010 census, there were 1,899 people, 706 households and 476 families living in the town. The population density was 973.8 per square mile (376.0/km^{2}). There were 795 housing units at an average density of 407.7 per square mile (157.4/km^{2}). The racial make-up of the town was 97.7% White, 0.3% African American, 0.2% Native American, 0.1% Asian, 0.3% from other races and 1.4% from two or more races. Hispanic or Latino of any race were 0.8% of the population.

There were 706 households, of which 38.7% had children under the age of 18 living with them, 44.2% were married couples living together, 16.9% had a female householder with no husband present, 6.4% had a male householder with no wife present, and 32.6% were non-families. 28.3% of all households were made up of individuals, and 14.7% had someone living alone who was 65 years of age or older. The average household size was 2.53 and the average family size was 3.06.

The median age was 36.7 years. 28.1% of residents were under the age of 18, 6.9% were between the ages of 18 and 24, 25.7% were from 25 to 44, 21.5% were from 45 to 64 and 17.9% were 65 years of age or older. The sex make-up of the town was 46.6% male and 53.4% female.

=== 2000 census ===
At the 2000 census, there were 1,816 people, 693 households and 460 families living in the town. The population density was 955.2 per square mile (368.8/km^{2}). There were 768 housing units at an average density of 404.0 per square mile (156.0/km^{2}). The racial make-up of the town was 98.51% White, 0.22% African American, 0.28% Native American, 0.33% Asian and 0.66% from two or more races. Hispanic or Latino of any race were 0.50% of the population.

There were 693 households, of which 33.3% had children under the age of 18 living with them, 50.5% were married couples living together, 10.2% had a female householder with no husband present, and 33.6% were non-families. 28.7% of all households were made up of individuals, and 16.5% had someone living alone who was 65 years of age or older. The average household size was 2.52 and the average family size was 3.13.

27.1% of the population were under the age of 18, 8.9% from 18 to 24, 28.3% from 25 to 44, 18.8% from 45 to 64 and 17.0% were 65 years of age or older. The median age was 34 years. For every 100 females, there were 91.2 males. For every 100 females age 18 and over, there were 85.4 males.

The median household income was $36,066 and the median family income was $41,435. Males had a median income of $31,512 and females $22,244. The per capita income was $16,191. About 7.9% of families and 9.0% of the population were below the poverty line, including 11.4% of those under age 18 and 9.0% of those age 65 or over.

== Education ==
It is in the Milan Community Schools school district, which has three schools - Milan Elementary, Milan Middle and Milan High School. The corporation was a 2006 Indiana Department of Education Exemplary Progress School Corporation.

Milan has a public library, a branch of the Osgood Public Library.

== Notable people ==
- Jamie Johnson - member of the Grascals
- William Jordan - actor and member of the 1954 Milan High School basketball team.
- Bobby Plump - member of the 1954 Milan High School basketball team; author; restaurateur.
- Gene White - member of the 1954 Milan High School Indiana State Championship basketball team.
