= Hinkle Fieldhouse =

Historic indoor arena in Indianapolis, Indiana, US

- Indiana's Basketball Cathedral
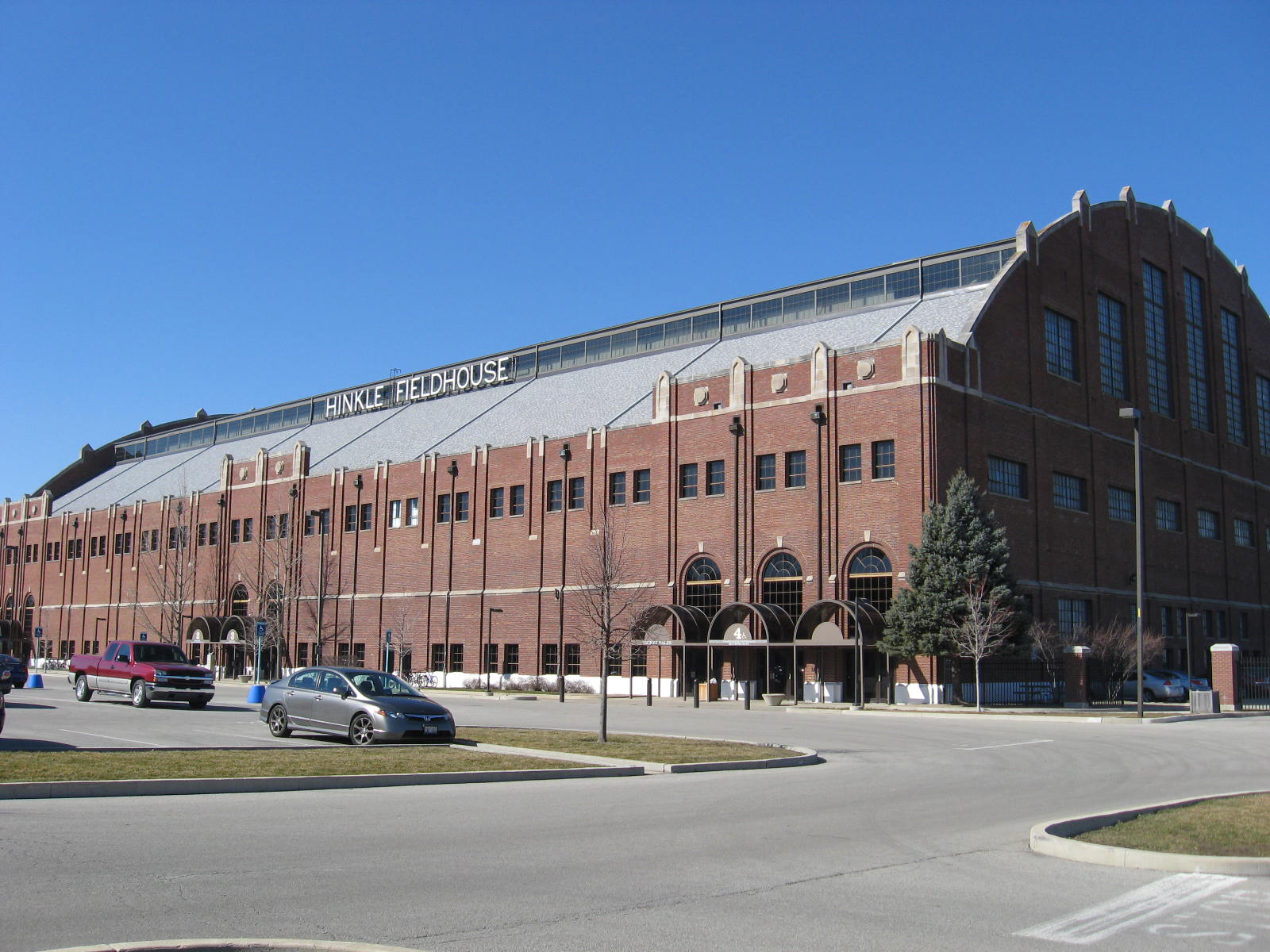
- View from southeast in 2012

- Location in the United States Location in Indiana
- Former names: Butler Fieldhouse (1928–1966)
- Address: 510 West 49th Street
- Location: Indianapolis, Indiana, U.S.
- Owner: Butler University
- Operator: Butler University
- Capacity: 9,100 (2014–present); 10,000 (2009–2014); 11,043 (1989–2009); 15,000 (1928–1989)
- Butler Fieldhouse
- U.S. National Register of Historic Places
- U.S. National Historic Landmark
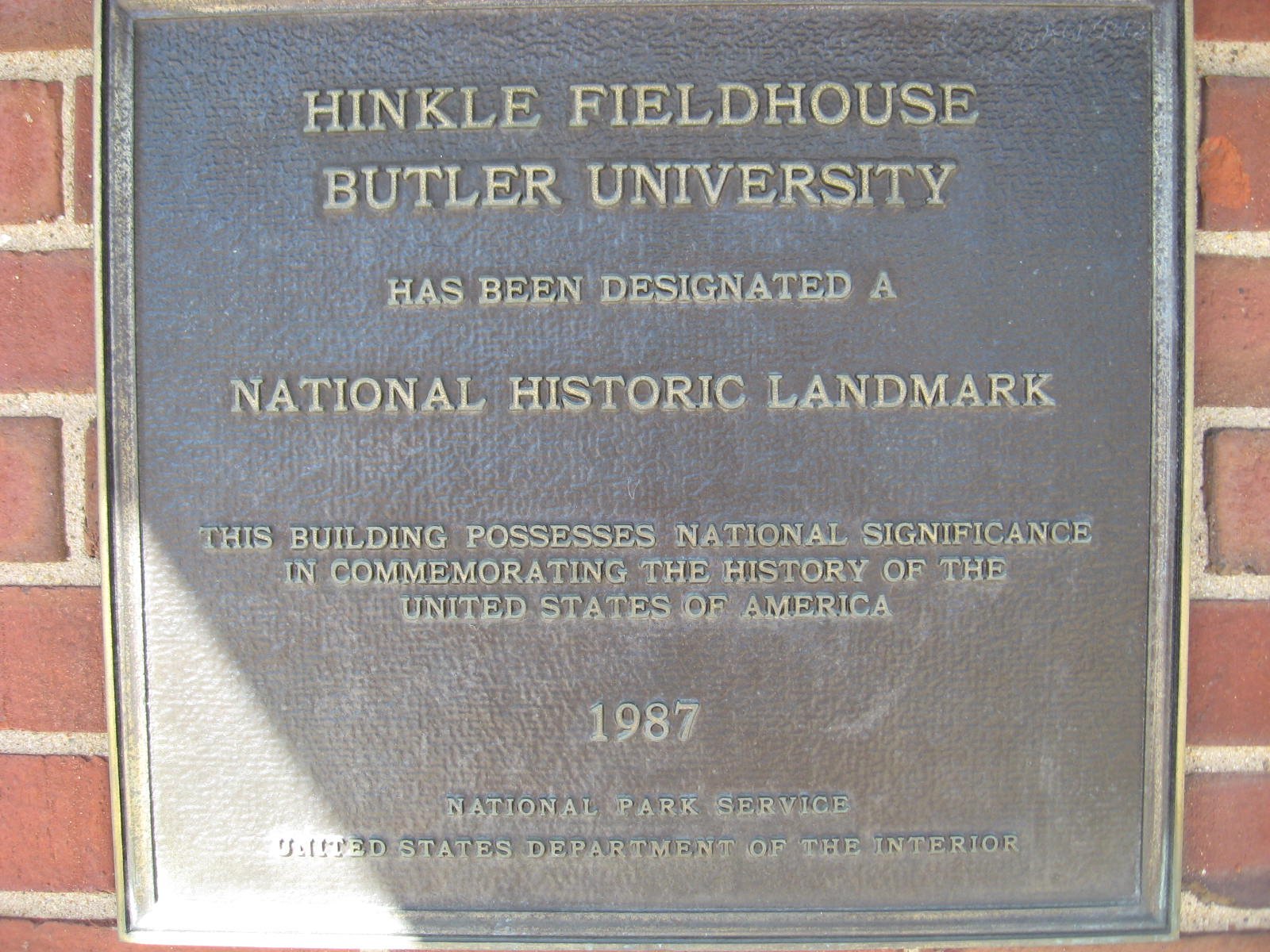
- National Historic Landmark plaque

- Location within Indianapolis Location within Indiana Location within the United States
- Coordinates: 39°50′37″N 86°10′2″W
- Built: 1927
- Architect: Fermor Spencer Cannon
- NRHP reference No.: 83003573

Significant dates
- Added to NRHP: December 22, 1983
- Designated NHL: February 27, 1987
- Surface: Hardwood

Construction
- Built: 1927
- Opened: March 7, 1928; 98 years ago
- Renovated: 1989, 2011–2014
- Cost: $750,000 ($14.1 million in 2025 dollars)
- Architect: Fermor Spencer Cannon

Tenants
- Butler Bulldogs (Big East) (1928–present); Indianapolis Jets (BAA) (1948–1949); Indianapolis Olympians (NBA) (1949–1953); 1987 Pan American Games

Hinkle Fieldhouse (originally Butler Fieldhouse) is a basketball arena in the midwestern United States, located on the campus of Butler University in Indianapolis, Indiana. Completed in early 1928, it was the largest basketball arena in the U.S. until 1950. The facility was renamed in 1966 in honor of Butler's longtime coach and athletic director, Paul D. "Tony" Hinkle. The sixth-oldest college basketball arena still in use, it was added to the National Register of Historic Places in 1983 and designated a U.S. National Historic Landmark in 1987. Hinkle Fieldhouse is sometimes referred to as "Indiana's Basketball Cathedral."

Hinkle Fieldhouse has served as the home court for the Butler Bulldogs men's basketball team since 1928 (with the exception of 1943 to 1945, when it was converted to a military barracks during World War II) and as the site of the annual Indiana High School Boys Basketball Tournament's championship games from 1928 to 1971. In addition to amateur and professional basketball games, it has hosted visits from U.S. presidents, indoor track events and bicycle races, professional tennis matches, circuses, and other civic and religious gatherings.

The Butler Bulldogs men's basketball team won the Horizon League conference title at Hinkle in 2010. Several memorable high school basketball championship games were played at the Butler arena, including the 1954 title game, when tiny Milan High School's basketball team defeated a larger Muncie Central High School team. Milan's team served as the inspiration for the movie Hoosiers (1986), and the final scenes of the film's championship game were filmed at Hinkle Fieldhouse.

== History ==
Hinkle Fieldhouse (originally named Butler Fieldhouse) was among the first buildings erected when Butler University moved to the Fairview campus in Indianapolis, Indiana, in 1928. Butler Fieldhouse and the Butler Bowl (a 36,000-seat football stadium that has since been downsized and renamed the Bud and Jackie Sellick Bowl) were promoted by a corporation of 41 Indianapolis businessmen who viewed them as a benefit to the city as well as Butler. When Butler signed a lease with the Indiana High School Athletic Association to host the championship games of the state's high school basketball tournament, the corporation agreed to finance the construction project at a cost of $1 million.

Designed by Indianapolis architect Fermor Spencer Cannon, construction began on the basketball arena at 49th Street and Boulevard Place on the northeast edge of Butler's campus in fall of 1927. When completed in early 1928, it was the largest basketball arena in the United States, a distinction it retained until 1950, and is the sixth-oldest college basketball arena still in use. Called Butler Fieldhouse from 1928 to 1966, it was renamed Hinkle Fieldhouse in honor of Butler's longtime coach and athletic director, Paul D. "Tony" Hinkle. The arena's design included a steel truss system that provides spectators with unobstructed views of the basketball court, an initial seating capacity of more than 15,000, and a fireproof brick and stone exterior. The innovative technology for its time served as the inspiration for other basketball arenas. Hinkle Fieldhouse was added to the National Register of Historic Places on December 22, 1983, and designated a National Historic Landmark on February 27, 1987, and has been in use for nine decades.

Although Hinkle Fieldhouse has hosted other events, it is best known as a basketball venue in a state that is well known for its enthusiasm for the game (often referred to as "Hoosier Hysteria"). In addition to serving as the home court for the Butler Bulldogs men's basketball team, Butler hosted the Indiana high school tournament's championship games from 1928 to 1971 (except for 1943 to 1945, when the arena was converted to a military barracks to house U.S. Army Air Forces and U.S. Navy recruits during World War II. The state high school championship games returned to the Butler Fieldhouse in 1946 and remained there until 1972, when the Indiana High School Athletic Association moved the state basketball tournament's championship games to Indiana University's Assembly Hall in Bloomington, and later to other venues in the state.

In November 1965, Butler University's board of trustees voted in favor of renaming the basketball facility Hinkle Fieldhouse to honor Paul D. "Tony" Hinkle, a former three-sport coach and athletic director at Butler. Hinkle, who came to Butler as an assistant basketball coach in 1921, was named its head basketball coach in 1926. Hinkle served as head coach of the Butler men's basketball, baseball, and football teams from 1934 to 1970. He was also Butler's athletic director.

On December 22, 1983, Hinkle Fieldhouse was added to the National Register of Historic Places, and designated a National Historic Landmark on February 27, 1987, in recognition of its role in transforming college basketball into a popular spectator sport in the 1920s and 1930s. Hinkle Fieldhouse is one of only a few early 20th-century sports arenas still in use in the United States, and among the best-preserved of its kind. Brad Stevens, the former Butler basketball coach who became the head coach of the Boston Celtics, once remarked that Hinkle Fieldhouse is "not for everybody. But it is for somebody that appreciates tradition, somebody that appreciates history." In 2006, to celebrate Butler University's 150th anniversary, a documentary about Hinkle Fieldhouse entitled Indiana's Basketball Cathedral aired on ESPN. More recently, a $36.2 million renovation and restoration project was completed in 2014. The 2015–2016 basketball season was the first full season in the upgraded facility.

== Building description ==
The exterior of the historic arena has the appearance of "a red-brick airplane hangar" and has been called "Indiana's Basketball Cathedral." Designed by Indianapolis architect Fermor Spencer Cannon, a founding member of the Indiana Society of Architects, the six-story brick arena on more than 3 acres (1.2 hectares) had an original seating capacity of 15,000. The expansive, cathedral-like facilities were the result of an arched-steel truss system that supported the roof and provided unobstructed views of the basketball court. Butler's fieldhouse was also among the earliest of its kind to use ramps for access to upper-deck seats. Because of its innovative construction, Hinkle Fieldhouse has served as a prototype for other indoor athletic facilities, including the design of Gainbridge Fieldhouse, home to the city's NBA and WNBA teams, respectively the Indiana Pacers and Indiana Fever.

=== Exterior and plan ===
The rectangular plan for the arena lies on an east–west axis with round-arch gable ends. Its steel truss system supports a three-stage monitor roof and red-brick walls resting on a poured concrete foundation. The three-story main facade (south wall) is constructed of brick on a concrete foundation. A stone belt course surrounds the structure between the first and second stories. Decorative buttresses vertically divide the main facade into twenty-two bays. There are eight entry gates on the south wall with tall, round-arch windows above the entry doors. The north wall is similar to main facade, but it does not have entry gates. The east facade has a round-arch gable about six stories tall, as well as nine bays divided by buttresses. The west facade is identical to east wall above third floor; however, a two-story brick wing is attached to the west wall at its lower levels. The arena's exterior still retain its original features, but the steel-framed windows and metal doors have been either repaired or replaced in subsequent renovations.

=== Interior ===
The main interior feature of the arena is an NCAA regulation-sized basketball court at the center. The removable hardwood basketball court, which originally ran east–west, was changed in 1933 to a north–south orientation to provide additional arena seating and to avoid the glare of late afternoon sun on the court.

Three tiers of seating, which originally contained wooden plank bleachers, surround the basketball court on all sides. (Most of these bleachers were replaced with seat back chairs and the original trough urinals were replaced with waterless urinals during a renovation in 2014.) The interior also has poured concrete floors and ramps, which lead to the two upper tiers of stands, and an open concourse surrounding the stands. In addition, the interior framework has exposed steel girders and corrugated metal roof sheathing. Interior walls are brown glazed brick. Ticket offices are located at the entryway. Concrete block offices and classrooms initially built under the main floor stands were removed during renovations in 2014. Natural light streams in from the monitor roof and gable-end windows. The facility also has electric lighting.

=== Wing ===
The fieldhouse's two-story brick wing has a flat roof and is attached to the arena's west wall at the lower levels. The wing's main floor originally contained a swimming pool and a small gymnasium; lockers and mechanical rooms were in the area below ground. The wing had fallen into disuse and was completely remodeled as part of major renovations completed in 2014.

=== Renovations ===
The basketball arena has been renovated and remodeled several times over its 90-year history. In 1933, for example, the interior was reconfigured, to change the court from an east–west to a north–south orientation. In the initial arrangement, more than half of the seats were at the ends of the court, while event viewing is typically better from the sides. A major $1.5 million facelift in 1989 reduced the original seating capacity of 15,000 to 11,043. The main reception area, basketball offices, film rooms, and team locker rooms were also renovated. In 1992, other athletic and physical education offices, sports locker rooms, and fitness facilities at the fieldhouse were renovated as well.

Butler University began planning in 2009 for another major renovation to the exterior and interior of the facility. The $36.2 million renovation and restoration project was completed in 2014. RATIO Architects worked with university officials to maintain appearance of the historic exterior, improve the interior's accessibility, and renovate the building's wing. To assist with renovation costs, the university was the recipient of a $750,000 federal Save America's Treasures grant. In 2015, Indiana Landmarks awarded Butler its Cook Cup for Outstanding Renovation.

Because of the building's National Historic Landmark status, exterior changes to the fieldhouse are minimal. Renovations made in 2014 included the replacement of steel-sash windows and 9,700 windowpanes, in addition to tuckpointing 282,000 exterior bricks. Interior renovations made in 2014 included removal of offices and storage space under the bleachers to open up the main concourses, adding decorative murals and new scoreboards, upgrading seating to improve accessibility and comply with the Americans with Disabilities Act of 1990, and additional mechanical upgrades such as air conditioning. The appearance of the basketball court, barrel-vaulted ceiling, and the exposed-steel roof trusses are mostly unchanged.

As part of the 2014 renovations, the arena's seating capacity was reduced from 10,000 to 9,100. The gym, which was originally filled with bleachers, was altered to include about 4,500 chair-back seats (covering nearly all of the lower two levels) and handrails along the aisles; however, some bleachers remain for student seating. In addition, a large video board was installed above midcourt and smaller scoreboards occupy each of the four corners. "The scoreboards on the side are new, but it still has a historic feel," remarked Butler senior guard Alex Barlow in an interview in 2014. "It still has a lot of modern upgrades that fans like to see. If you see the locker room and the weight room and the training room, it's come a long way since I've gotten here."

New spaces were created during the renovation to the attached wing at the west end of Hinkle Fieldhouse by adding two floors to a former swimming pool area closed in 2002 due to the high maintenance costs. The result was a three-level facility that includes a training facilities, locker rooms, and an academic center with study spaces in an area the athletic department had been using for storage. In addition, an elevator was installed to reach upper decks of the fieldhouse. Butler's athletic administrative offices and coaches' offices are on the top level. The training facility on the second floor is reportedly six times larger than the previous training area. The men's and women's basketball offices are adjacent to their respective locker rooms on the lower level near the court have been upgraded. The men's basketball locker room has been expanded and, for the first time, has a separate video room. Gordon Hayward, a former Butler star who went on to become a professional player with the Utah Jazz in 2010 and Boston Celtics player in 2017, donated the funds for the locker-room renovation.

== Events ==
Hinkle Fieldhouse has hosted annual championship games of Indiana's high school basketball tournament, numerous collegiate games and tournaments, U.S. Olympic team exhibition games, and professional basketball games, as well as other special events.

During World War II, the fieldhouse was temporarily converted to a military barracks. The floor was paved over, while facilities like offices and recreation rooms were built underneath the bleachers.

=== Notable Butler team events ===
The Butler Bulldogs men's basketball team, who were named the national champions in 1928, won the inaugural game at Butler Fieldhouse on March 7, 1928, beating the University of Notre Dame, the defending national champion, with a final score of 21–13 in overtime with 12,000 fans in attendance.

Hinkle Fieldhouse hosted the entire 1994 Horizon League men's basketball conference tournament as well as parts of the 2004, 2008, 2009, and 2010 Horizon League tournaments. Butler's men's basketball team won the Horizon League conference title at Hinkle in 2010. Butler's men's and women's basketball teams continue to play their home games at Hinkle Fieldhouse as part of the Big East Conference.

=== Notable high school tournaments ===
In addition to hosting home games for the Butler basketball teams, Hinkle Fieldhouse was the site of Indiana's annual state high school boys' basketball championship games from 1928 to 1971. The only exception was 1943 to 1945, when the arena was used as a military barracks and the state's high school basketball championship games were held at the Coliseum on the grounds of the Indiana State Fair. In 1946, Indiana's high school basketball tournament games returned to Butler and remained there until 1972, when the championship games moved to Indiana University Bloomington's Assembly Hall, and from there to other venues. Afterwards, Hinkle Fieldhouse hosted sectional basketball games through 1993. The sectional games moved to Lawrence North High School in 1994.

In the first high school boys' championship basketball game at Butler Fieldhouse in 1928, Muncie Central High School defeated Martinsville High School. (John Wooden, a member of the Martinsville team, went on to become a college basketball coach at Indiana State Teachers College (present-day Indiana State University) and beginning in 1948 at the University of California, Los Angeles.) In Butler Fieldhouse's first sellout crowd for the state tournament's championship game In March 1930, the Washington Hatchets defeated Muncie Central. At that time, Butler's basketball arena was "considered one of the premier places in the country to hold games."

Among the most memorable high school basketball games played at the Butler Fieldhouse occurred in the 1946 state championship game when Anderson High School's "Jumping Johnny" Wilson set a state finals record as the first player "to score 30 points in a title game." Another notable game was the "Milan Miracle" in 1954, when tiny Milan High School's basketball team defeated the much larger Muncie Central High School team. Milan player Bobby Plump made the last-minute score to win the game and went on to become a star player at Butler. (The Milan team and the tournament win also served as the inspiration for the fictional Hickory High School team in the movie, Hoosiers (1986). The final scenes of the movie's championship game were also filmed at the fieldhouse.)

In 1950, Butler Fieldhouse was the site of the first televised broadcast of a state championship game. In the 1955 and 1956 state championship games at Butler Fieldhouse, Oscar Robertson and his teammates at Indianapolis's Crispus Attucks High School won back-to-back state championships, a first time for an all-black high school team. Crispus Attucks High School also used the Butler Fieldhouse as its home gym in the 1950s.

=== NCAA tournament ===
Hinkle Fieldhouse (then called Butler Fieldhouse) hosted the East Regional of the 1940 NCAA basketball tournament. The East Regional was one of only two regionals since the 1940 tournament involved only eight teams. The arena also hosted the first, second, and regional semifinal (Sweet 16) round games of the 2021 NCAA Division I men's basketball tournament.

=== Other notable basketball games ===
Hinkle Fieldhouse has been host to other basketball-related events such as professional basketball teams, U.S. Olympic team exhibition games, and the first USSR-USA basketball game, as well as all-star basketball games for the NBA, ABA and the East-West College All-Stars.

Several notable games took place at Butler Fieldhouse in the 1940s and 1950s. The 1940 NCAA basketball tournament East Regionals were held there, and won by the eventual national men's champion, the Indiana Hoosiers. Until 1978, those games were the only NCAA tournament games held in Indianapolis. In 1948 the annual Hoosier Classic basketball tournament with Indiana University, Purdue University, the University of Notre Dame, and Butler played its inaugural games at Butler Fieldhouse during the winter holidays. An estimated 75,000 fans watched these games in the first three years of the tournament. The NBA's Indianapolis Olympians, formed in 1949, used the Fieldhouse until the team disbanded and withdrew from the NBA after the 1952–53 season. In 1956, a few weeks before the U.S. Olympic team won a gold medal at the Summer Olympics in Melbourne, Australia, Bill Russell and other U.S. Olympic team members played an exhibition game at Butler Fieldhouse against the Phillips 66ers, the national Amateur Athletic Union championship team.

In September 2019, the WNBA's Indiana Fever announced that they would use Hinkle Fieldhouse for all home games in 2020 and 2021, as well as part of the 2022 season. The move was made to accommodate a major renovation of Bankers Life Fieldhouse. The vast majority of work is scheduled to take place during the NBA offseason, which includes the entire WNBA season, though the COVID-19 pandemic moved the Fever to a league-wide bubble environment at IMG Academy in Bradenton, Florida.

The championship game of 2026 NBA Cup will take place at Hinkle Fieldhouse on December 11, 2026.

=== Other events ===
In addition to basketball games, Hinkle Fieldhouse has been used for other athletic events such as professional tennis matches, six-day bicycle races, national equestrian events, and the Butler Relays (a national indoor track event in the 1930s and 1940s), among others. Ten indoor world records for track events were set or tied at the Butler Relays, including Jesse Owens's world record of 6.1 seconds in the 60-yard (55 m) dash in 1935. Hinkle Fieldhouse hosted the Men's and women's volleyball tournament during the 1987 Pan American Games, attracting 15,000 spectators. At that time, it was the highest-attended volleyball match ever held in the United States.

In addition, Hinkle Fieldhouse has served as an "unofficial convention center" for politicians and religious leaders such as Wendell Willkie, Thomas E. Dewey, and Jesse Jackson; Evangelist Billy Graham; and host to U.S. presidents (Herbert Hoover, Dwight D. Eisenhower, Richard Nixon, Gerald Ford, George H. W. Bush, and Bill Clinton). Other special events have included three-ring circuses and a two-day, 125-piano concert.

The final scene of the climactic championship game in Hoosiers (1986) was filmed at Hinkle Fieldhouse, the site of the 1954 championship game between Milan High School and Muncie Central. (The Milan team and the final game were the inspiration for the fictional basketball team in the movie.) The film also featured the voices of the game's original announcers, Hilliard Gates and Tom Carnegie.

== Gallery ==
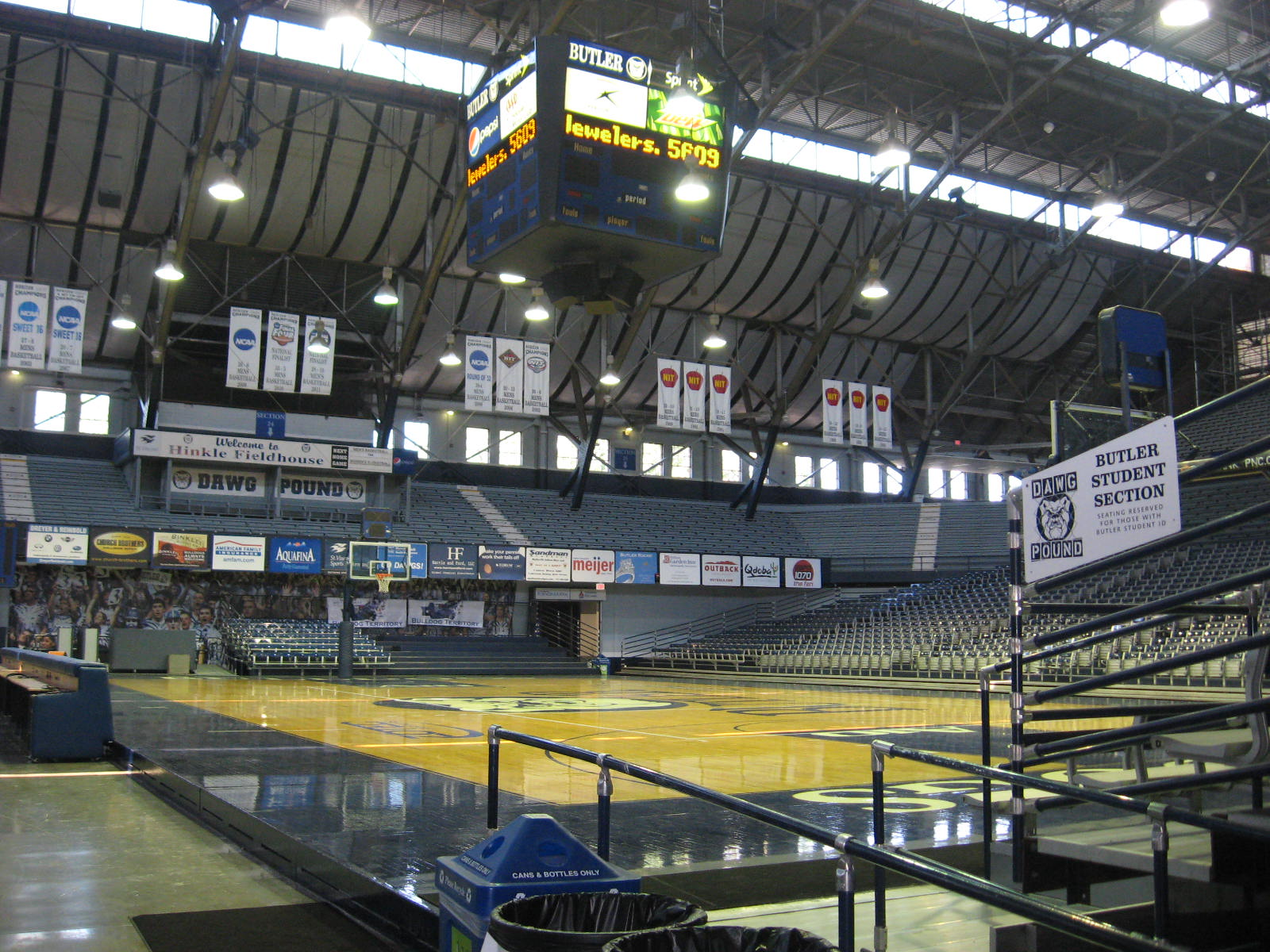
The floor of Hinkle Fieldhouse

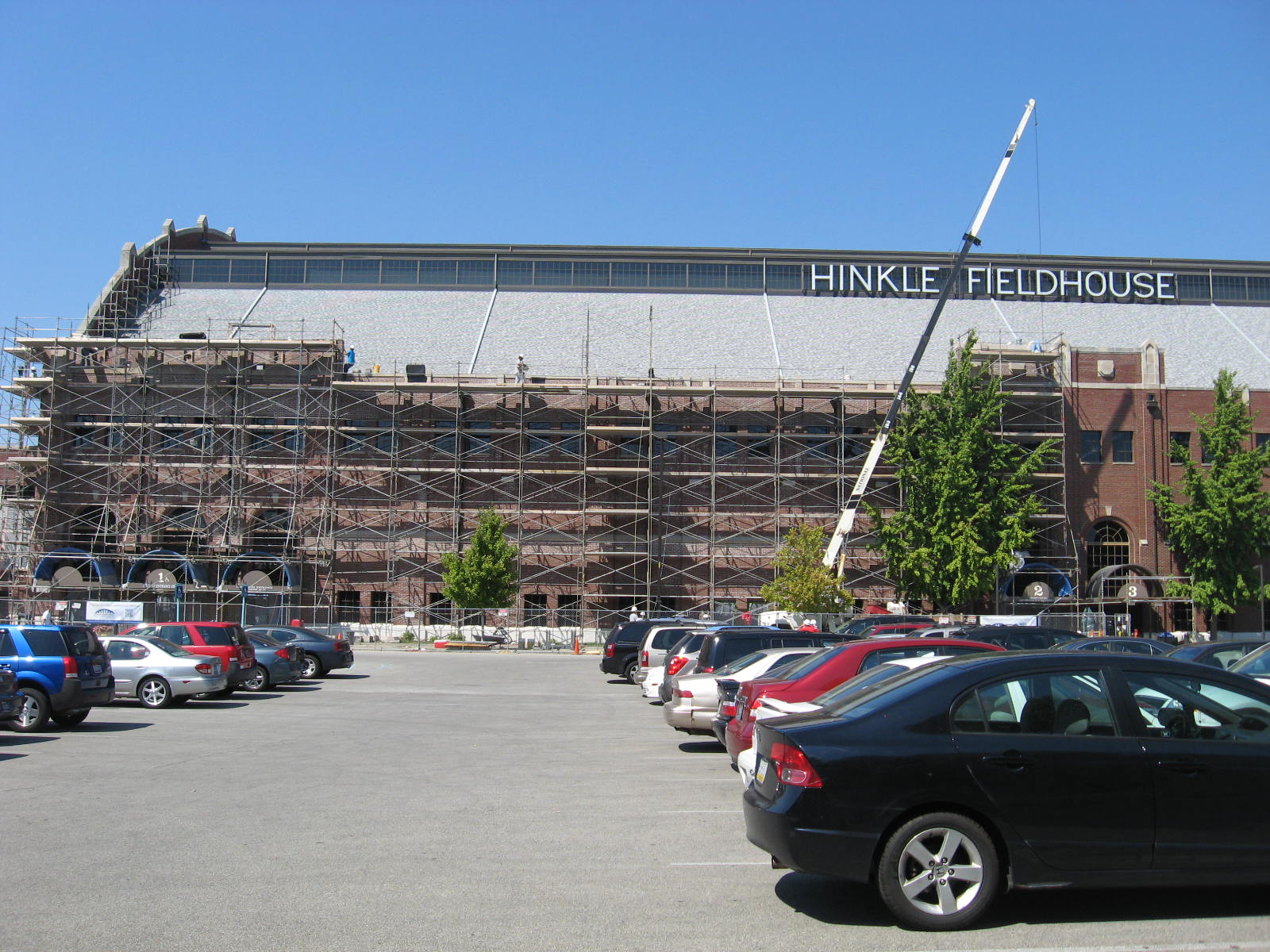
The south side of Hinkle Fieldhouse during renovation

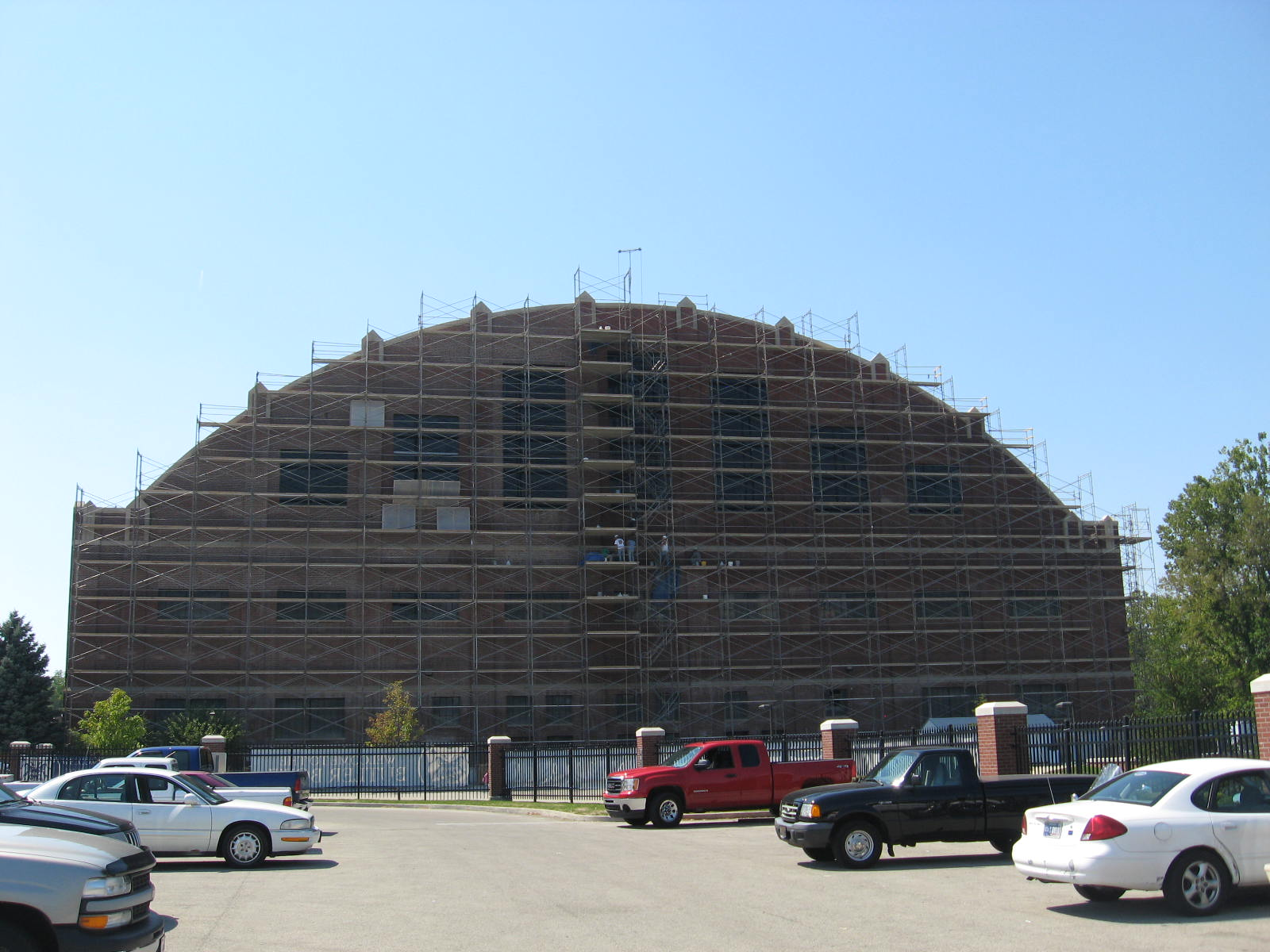
The east facade of Hinkle Fieldhouse during renovation

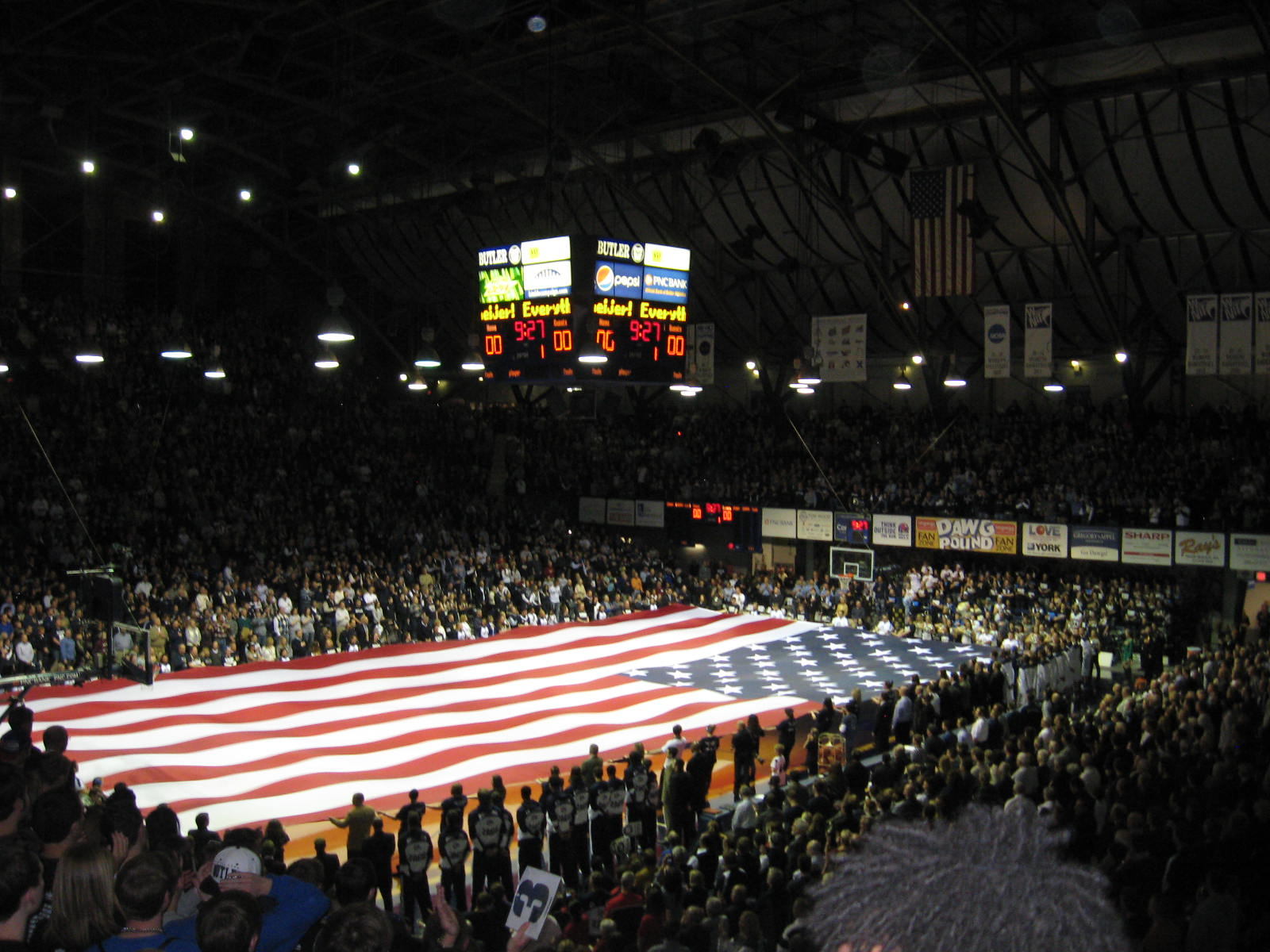
The National Anthem prior to the Butler-Gonzaga game, January 19, 2013

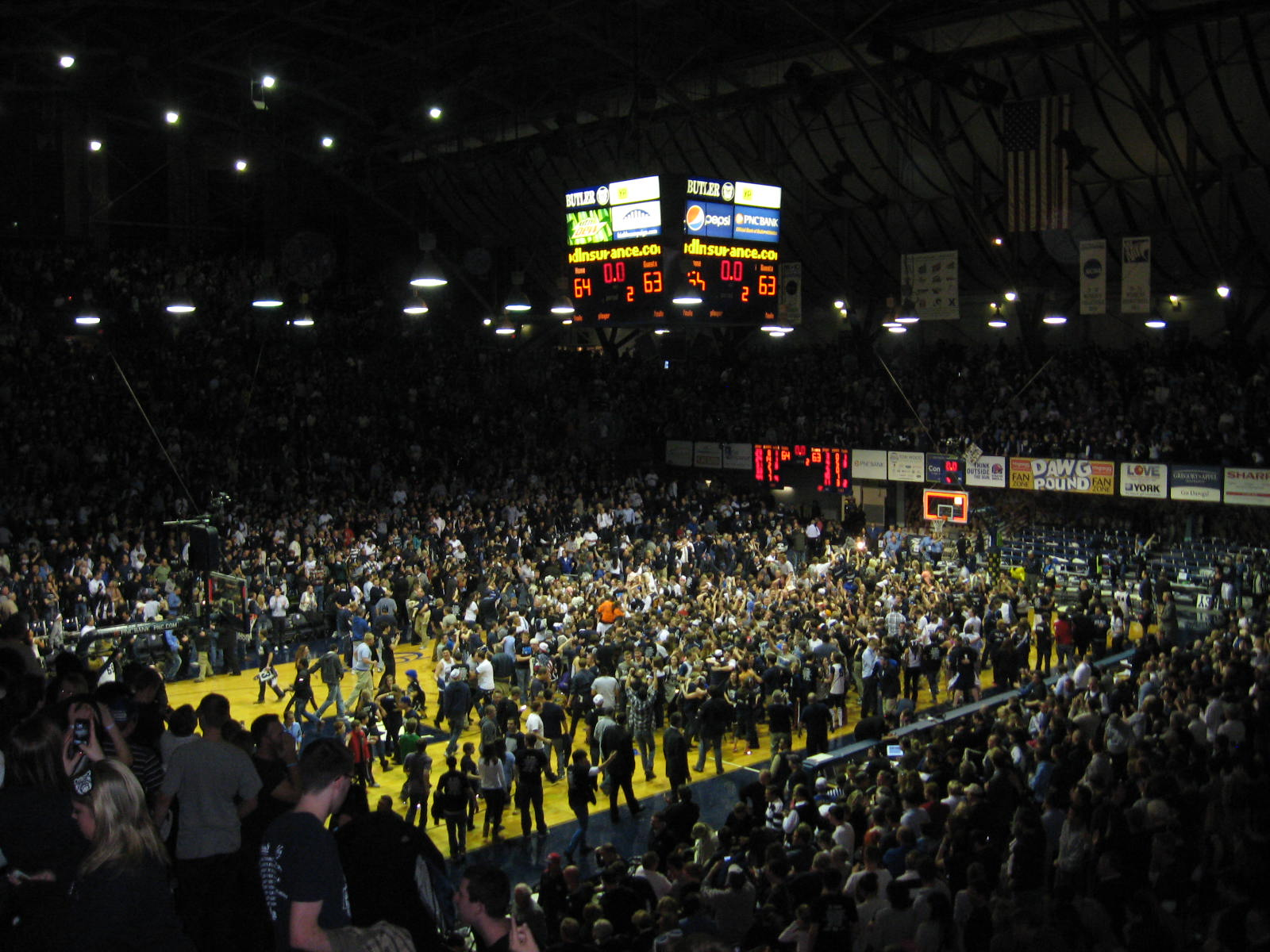
Students flood the court following the buzzer-beater victory over Gonzaga

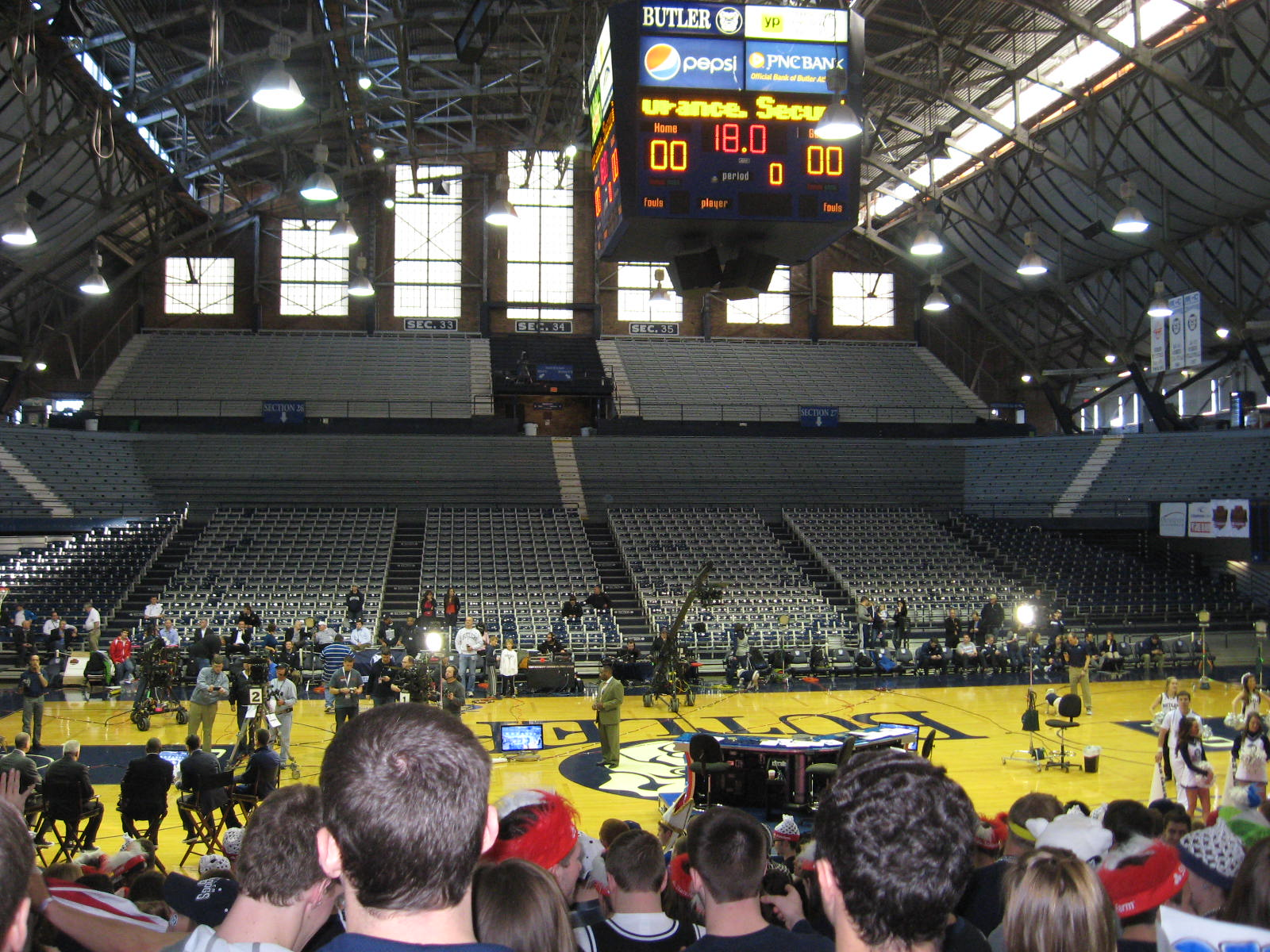
ESPN personalities on scene for College Gameday

== Panorama ==
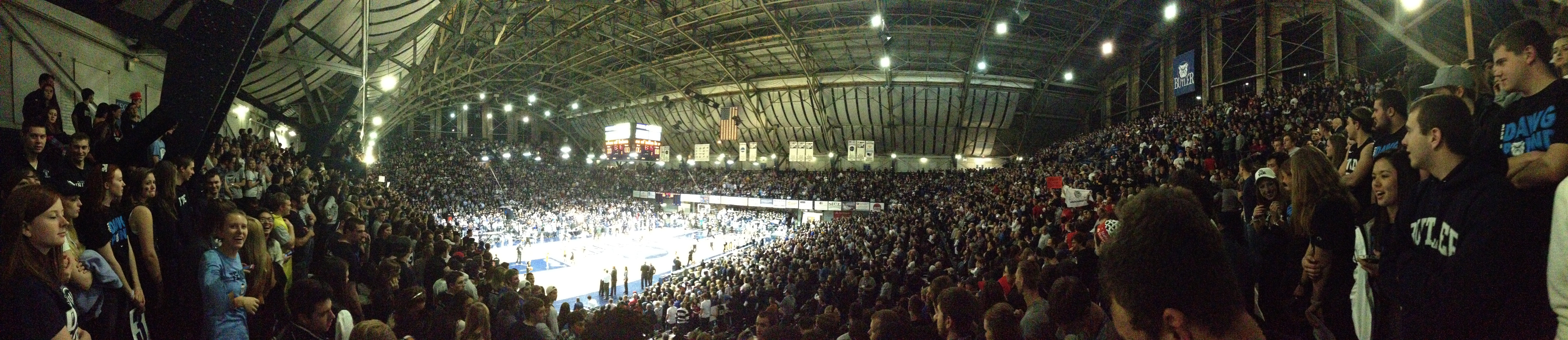
A panorama prior to the start of the Butler-Gonzaga game, Saturday, January 19, 2013.
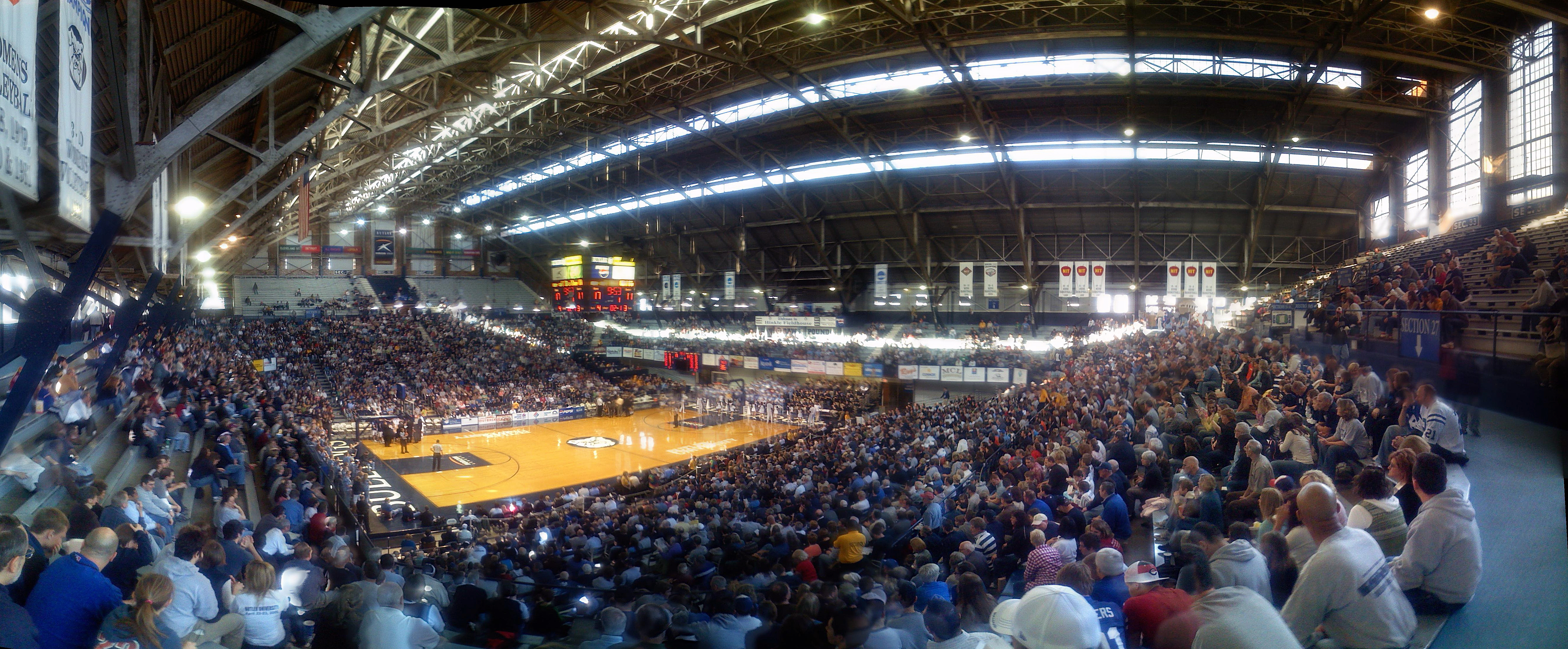
A panorama of the interior of Hinkle Fieldhouse, taken during the first half of a basketball game between the Butler Bulldogs and the Green Bay Phoenix.

== See also ==
- Allen Fieldhouse
- Cameron Indoor Stadium
- Palestra
- Rose Hill Gymnasium
- List of NCAA Division I basketball arenas
- List of attractions and events in Indianapolis
- List of music venues in the United States
- List of National Historic Landmarks in Indiana
- National Register of Historic Places listings in Marion County, Indiana
