= Hilliard Gates =

American sportscaster

Hilliard Gates (December 14, 1915 – November 21, 1996) was an American sportscaster who was widely regarded as the founding father of Indiana sports broadcasting and the leading sportscaster in Indiana for decades.

== Early days ==
Born Hilliard Gates Gudelsky, Hilliard used his middle name, Gates, as he entered broadcasting at a station in Muskegon, Michigan. Gates moved his career to WOWO radio, at that time a 10,000-watt clear channel radio station in Fort Wayne, Indiana in 1940. During World War II he entered the Army Air Corps and was stationed at nearby Baer Field, which allowed him to continue his career at WOWO part-time. After the war he supervised the construction of WKJG radio which went on the air in November 1947 with Gates as General Manager and part owner. The station was largely owned by the Fort Wayne Journal-Gazette, which in turn was owned by William Kunkel. An initialism of this combination provided the station call letters. He put WKJG-FM on the air in June 1948 and in November 1953, was the first person to appear live on Fort Wayne television when he signed WKJG-TV onto the air. His segment Gatesway to Sports was very popular with Fort Wayne viewers.

== Sports announcing ==
Gates was highly respected as a sports announcer well outside northern Indiana. When tiny Milan High School won the state basketball championship at Butler University's Hinkle Fieldhouse in 1954, Hilliard Gates was at the microphone - and his delivery was so powerful and distinctive that he was also used as the announcer in the 1986 movie Hoosiers, a fictionalized story based on the Milan team's accomplishment.

Hilliard was the announcer who first introduced many sports to Fort Wayne television. He appeared on more network broadcasts than any other announcer in Indiana history, and in 1967 and 1968, he broadcast the Rose Bowl in Pasadena, California for NBC radio. Hilliard was named Indiana Sportscaster of the Year seven times and was nominated for the honor 20 consecutive years. He was the first broadcaster to be inducted into the Indiana Basketball Hall of Fame (1969). In 1977, the Indiana Basketball Coaches Association cited him for his long contribution to Indiana basketball.

== Station management ==
During his tenure as vice-president and general manager of WKJG-TV, the station was proud of having hired many talented beginners who eventually moved on to larger markets and bigger paychecks. However, this was probably a consequence of their low budgets. For years, WKJG's news broadcasts were assured good ratings simply on the basis of their sports coverage. In the 1980s, competitors fought aggressively for the news viewer with upgraded sets, larger staffs, personable newscasters, and enhanced production graphics, with WPTA, youngest of the three major network affiliates, highest in the ratings.

== Retirement ==
Gates retired as vice president and general manager of WKJG-TV in 1990 and served as a consultant to the station until May 1993 before his death 1996. After Gates' death, WKJG-TV fared even more poorly. New station management attempted a facelift, even changing the call letters to WISE-TV, but without much success.

== Community leadership and honors ==
Gates held office in many community and state organizations. He was on the original Jaycees committee that got the Allen County War Memorial Coliseum built in 1951. He was twice elected president of the Fort Wayne Press Club.

- Indiana Governor Roger D. Branigin named Gates a Sagamore of the Wabash.
- Fort Wayne Sports Corporation annually awards the Hilliard Gates Achievement Award for contributions to athletics in Fort Wayne.
- Indiana University – Purdue University Fort Wayne (IPFW) named its on-campus sports arena the Hilliard Gates Sports Center in his honor. When IPFW was dissolved in July 2018 and replaced by Indiana University Fort Wayne and Purdue University Fort Wayne (PFW), the IPFW athletic program passed entirely to PFW. The arena remains in use by the PFW athletic program.
