= William Jordan (actor) =

American film and television actor (born 1937)

- Born: William C. Jordan; October 13, 1937 (age 89); Milan, Indiana
- Occupation: Actor
- Years active: 1954–present

William C. Jordan (born October 13, 1937) is an American film and television actor. He played Major Jake Gatlin in season one of the television series Project UFO, among other roles in films and television series.

== Personal life ==
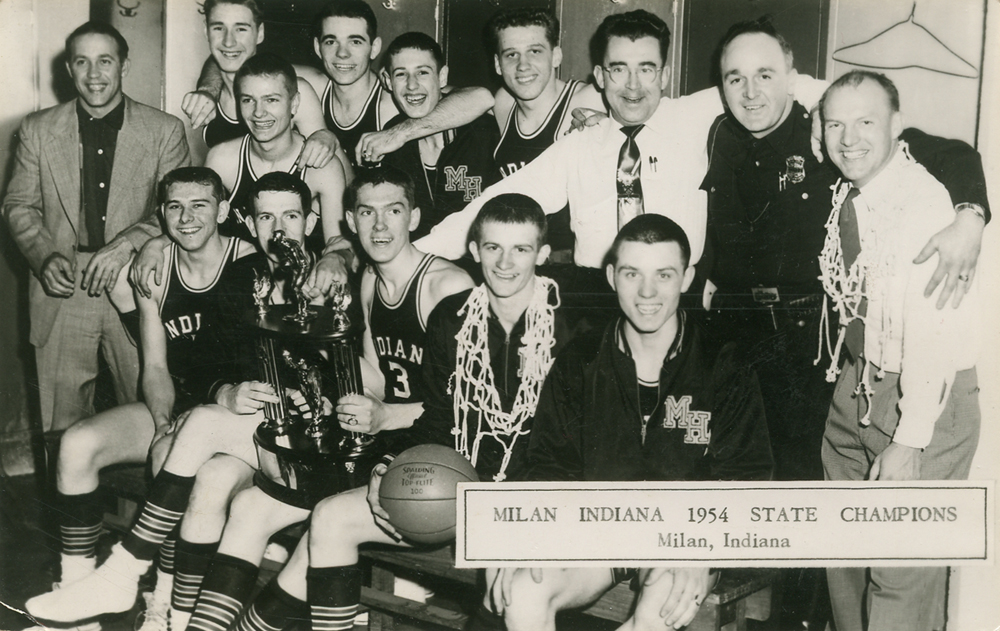
1954 Milan High School Basketball Team; Jordan is in the top row, fourth from right

Jordan was born in Milan, Indiana. As a high school student, under the name Bill Jordan, Jordan was a member of the famous 1954 Milan High School basketball team that won the 1954 Indiana High School Athletic Association (IHSAA) State Tournament. It was this 1954 Milan "Indians" basketball team on which the movie Hoosiers was loosely based. Jordan is a graduate of Indiana University.

During his career as an actor, Jordan rented an upscale apartment in Hollywood, while owning a large home in Arrowhead, California.

== Filmography ==
=== Film ===
- Nothing But a Man (1964) - Teenager
- To Catch a Pebble (1970)
- A Man Called Horse (1970) - Bent
- Deathmaster (1972) - Monk
- Rage (1972) - Major Cooper
- Blue Demon y Zovek en La invasión de los muertos (1973)
- The Parallax View (1974) - Tucker's Aide
- The Private Files of J. Edgar Hoover (1977) - President John F. Kennedy
- Gray Lady Down (1978) - Waters
- The Buddy Holly Story (1978) - Riley
- Hambone and Hillie (1983) - Bert Rollins
- Kingpin (1996) - Mr. Boorg
- Contact (1997) - Chairman of Joint Chiefs
- Brooklyn Lobster (2005) - John Evans
- Terra Firma (short film) (2008) - Barman

=== Television ===
- Flipper (1966) - Eric Tilton / Mr. Enfield (two episodes)
- The Rat Patrol (1967) - Major Heinrich Bruder (one episode)
- Judd, for the Defense (1968) - Wagner (one episode)
- The High Chaparral (1968) - Pearsall (one episode)
- The Big Valley (1968) - Dave Carr (one episode)
- Bonanza (1967, 1969) - Mr. Leek / Rusher (two episodes)
- Mannix (1972) (one episode)
- The Sixth Sense (1972) - John (one episode)
- Call to Danger (TV movie) (1973) - Tony Boyd
- Griff (1973) - Johnny Barton (one episode)
- The Magician (1973) - Sheriff R. Sanders (one episode)
- The New Adventures of Perry Mason (1974) (one episode)
- The Streets of San Francisco (1973–1974) - Bob Harris (two episodes)
- The Kansas City Massacre (TV movie) (1975) - John Dillinger
- Cannon (1975) - Holt (one episode)
- Barbary Coast (1975) - James Carr (one episode)
- Hallmark Hall of Fame (1976) - Kenneth Ormiston (one episode)
- The Rockford Files (1974–1977) - Jeffers / Police Officer Andrew Dolan / Terry Warde (three episodes)
- Lucan (1977) - Gene Boone (one episode)
- The Trial of Lee Harvey Oswald (TV movie) (1977) - James Kleist
- King (TV mini-series) (1978) - John F. Kennedy
- Project UFO (1978) - Major Jake Gatlin
- Friendly Fire (TV movie) (1979) - Col. Byron Schindler
- Beyond Westworld (1980) - Joseph Oppenheimer
- Secrets of Midland Heights (1981) - Martin Wheeler (one episode)
- Lou Grant (1980, 1982) - Danzinger / Pomeroy (two episodes)
- Simon & Simon (1983) - Dean Larkin (one episode)
- The Yellow Rose (1984) - The Foreman (one episode)
- Lottery! (1984) (one episode)
- Scarecrow and Mrs. King (1984) - Masterson (one episode)
- Knight Rider (1986) - Dr. Ian Browning (one episode)
- Beverly Hills Madam (TV movie) (1986) - Len Culver
- T. J. Hooker (1986) - Bill Kennedy (one episode)
- Guns of Paradise (1989) - Curtis Ivey (one episode)
- L.A. Law (1990) Mark Johnson (one episode)
- Knots Landing (1990) - Attorney (one episode)
- Mission of the Shark: The Saga of the U.S.S. Indianapolis (TV movie) (1991) - Hathaway
- Silk Stalkings (1993) - Fletcher Stanton (one episode)
- Walker, Texas Ranger (1997) - Jackson Blake Dupree (one episode)
- Mowgli: The New Adventures of the Jungle Book (1998) - Packwood (one episode)
