= Muncie Community Schools =

School district in Indiana, United States

Muncie Community Schools (MCS) is a school district headquartered in Muncie, Indiana.

The district is coextensive with Center Township, Delaware County, and it includes the vast majority of the municipality of Muncie.

== History ==
In 2008 the board of trustees of the school district became majority African-American.

In a period before 2018, the number of students in the district decreased. Circa 2018 the Indiana Department of Education gave the school district a "C" ranking. Seth Slabaugh of The Star Press wrote that year that the district was "high-poverty" and "has been in failing financial health for years".

In 2018 House Bill 1315, a proposed law put in the Indiana Legislature stated that Ball State University would take control of the Muncie district's school board. The legislative session ended, and the bill was not heard by the Indiana House of Representatives nor by the Indiana Senate. Geoffrey S. Mearns, the president of Ball State, stated disappointment about the bill not passing. In an opinion column for the Star Press, Jeff Ward argued that the members of the Indiana Legislature should have advanced the bill, and that "incompetence" rather than political opposition prevented its passing. At the time, the Republican Party had supermajority status in both the Indiana House and the Indiana Senate.

A special session was called which allowed the bill to be reconsidered. House Bill 1315 made it to the Governor of Indiana, who passed it into law. This meant the board of trustees of the university began to operate the school district, on July 1, 2018.

The board selected Lee Ann Kwiatkowski to operate the district in 2019. She retired in 2024, effective June 30. Chuck Reynolds became the new head of the school district.

In period prior to 2021, the enrollment had decreased. That year, the district administration anticipated that enrollment would now stay about the same. In 2022, it raised the salaries of teachers, and the district administration stated that it was the largest such occurrence in the history of the school district. Stephanie Wiechmann of Indiana Public Radio contrasted the raises in 2022 from the periods of financial issues that occurred around 2017.

== Schools ==
High school:

- Muncie Central High School

Middle schools:

- Northside Middle School
- Southside Middle School

Elementary schools:

- East Washington Academy
- Grissom Elementary School
- Longfellow Elementary School
- North View Elementary School
- South View Elementary School
- West View Elementary School

Preschool:

- Muncie Preschool

=== Former schools ===
High schools

- Muncie Southside High School

Elementary schools

- Mitchell Elementary School - Closed in 2017, with three board members voting in favor and two against. On April 6, 2017, the school had 202 students. Its areas were reassigned to North View Elementary School.
- Storer Elementary School - Closed in 2017, with three board members voting in favor and two against. On April 6, 2017, the school had 276 students. Its areas were reassigned to West View Elementary School.
- Sutton Elementary School - Closed in 2017, with three board members voting in favor and two against. On April 6, 2017, the school had 357 students. Its student body was divided between the East Washington, Grissom, and South View schools.

Prior to the 2017 closures of the Mitchell, Storer, and Sutton schools, according to The Star Press, MCS operated more schools than multiple school districts in Indiana of a similar student body size.
