= Peacock Apartments =

- U.S. National Register of Historic Places
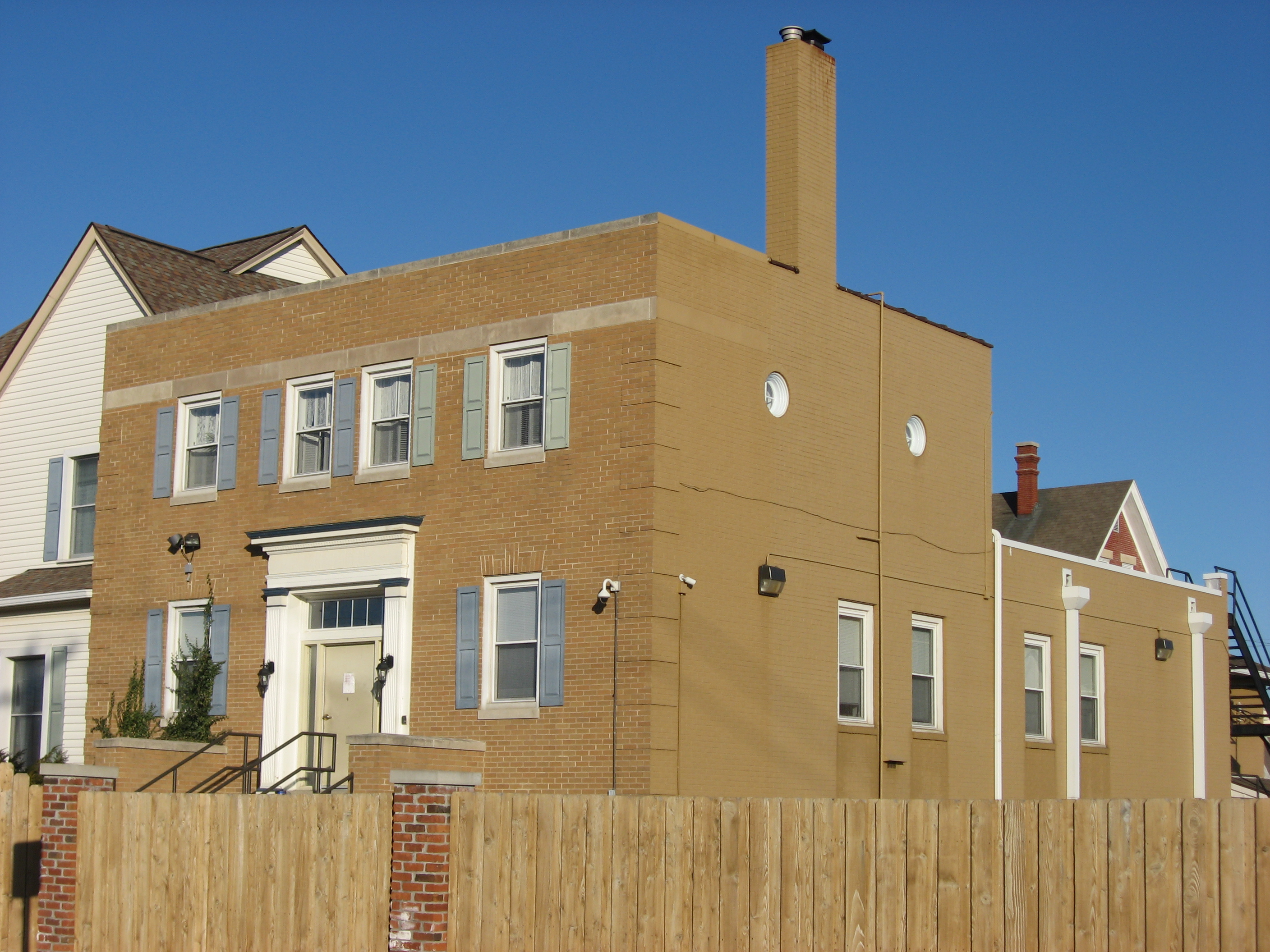
- Peacock Apartments, January 2012

- Location within Indiana Location within the United States
- Location: 414 S. Jefferson St., Muncie, Indiana
- Coordinates: 40°11′25″N 85°23′3″W
- Area: less than one acre
- Built: 1907
- Architectural style: Classical Revival
- MPS: Downtown Muncie MRA
- NRHP reference No.: 88002119
- Added to NRHP: November 14, 1988

Peacock Apartments is a historic apartment building located at Muncie, Indiana. It was built in 1907, and is a three-story, U-shaped Classical Revival style brick building with limestone detailing. It has a low-pitched roof, heavily dentiled cornice, and brick parapet. The front facade once featured a three-story porch.

The building was constructed by Henry and Lena Peacock. Henry Peacock, a history teacher from Winchester, served as principal of Muncie Central High School from 1910 to 1912.

It was added to the National Register of Historic Places in 1988.
