= Muncie Southside High School =

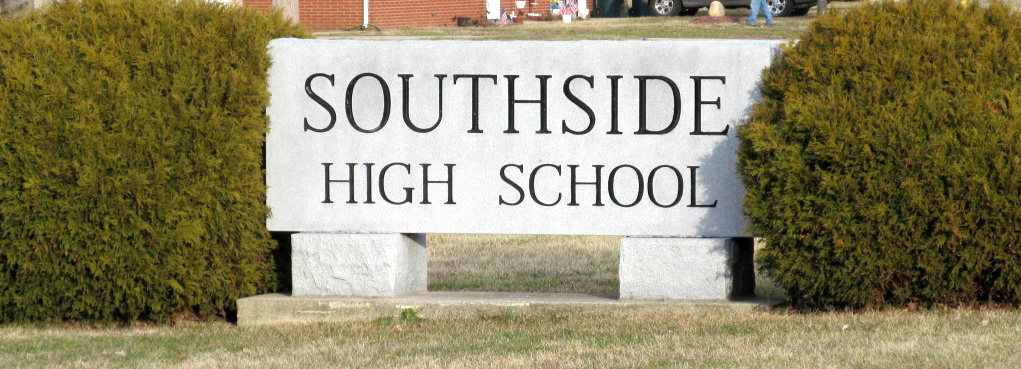

Location
- 1601 E. 26th Street; Muncie, Indiana 47302; United States; 40°09′46″N 85°22′9″W

Information
- Type: Public high school
- Established: September 6, 1962
- Closed: June 13, 2014
- School district: Muncie Community Schools
- Grades: 9-12
- Colors: Red and white
- Mascot: Rebel
- Website: School website

Muncie Southside High School (SHS) in Muncie, Indiana, United States, was a public high school which had an enrollment of 1,075 during the 2007/2008 school year. The school was part of the Muncie Community Schools Corp. It opened on September 6, 1962, and closed on June 13, 2014. The school was located at 1601 E. 26th Street. The graduating class of 2014 was the final graduating class, the building has become a middle school, and high school students have consolidated into one high school at Muncie Central High School.

== Notable alumni ==
- Brandon Gorin, football player
- Richie Lewis, baseball player
- Jamill Smith, football player
