= Maris Valainis =

American actor

- Born: February 18, 1963 (age 63); Indiana, U.S.
- Occupations: Construction consultant; actor

Maris Valainis (Latvian: Māris Valainis) (born on February 18, 1963) is an American construction consultant and a former actor, best known for his role in the 1986 film Hoosiers. He portrayed Jimmy Chitwood, a basketball player who makes a last-second shot to win a state high school championship.

Valainis, a native of Indiana, was invited to an open casting call for Hoosiers after being spotted by the film's casting director playing basketball at an open-gym night. Growing impatient waiting in line with hundreds of other hopefuls, Valainis decided to leave. But then the casting director saw him and asked him to come in and audition. Although Valainis had been cut each of the three times he tried out for his high school basketball team, he impressed the filmmakers enough that he was invited back the next day to read lines. After several rounds of callbacks, he landed the part of star player Jimmy Chitwood. Of the eight actors cast as team members, Valainis was one of only two who had never played high school basketball.

The scene in Hoosiers with Chitwood and Coach Dale talking while Chitwood is shooting baskets at an outdoor basket was filmed in one take. Valainis said that he "wasn't even listening to (Gene Hackman). I was just concentrating on making (the shots), and I made one, and they kept going in." In the scene where Chitwood makes the final shot of the state championship game, Valainis was told that whether he made the shot or not, the fans would rush the floor because of the need for a wide shot of the court. He made it on the first take, and later sank the same shot in a second take.

After shooting Hoosiers, Valainis moved to California to pursue a career in acting. However, he later reflected that after getting the role in Hoosiers so easily, he believes he took acting for granted. He landed a few small roles, one of them being Scott Thorson in the TV biopic Liberace (1988), before turning his attention to golf. Valainis had been an all-state golfer at Bishop Chatard High School in Indianapolis, Indiana, as well as a member of the golf team at Purdue University. After giving up on acting, he began a career in golf course management, including working as a caddie for professional golfers.

As of 2010, Valainis was working as a construction consultant. He was married, with two daughters, and living in Costa Mesa, California. He noted that when in public, he was still frequently recognized for his role in Hoosiers. As of 2017, Valainis was working as a scheduler for a construction firm based in Indianapolis.
