= Bobby Plump =

American basketball player

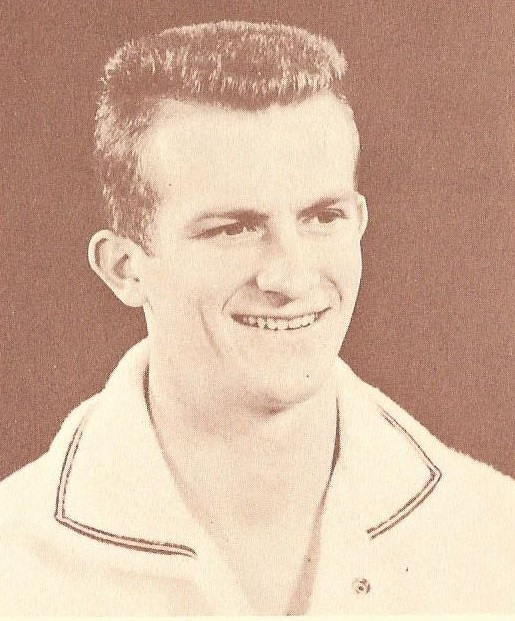
- Plump with the Phillips 66ers

Personal information
- Born: September 9, 1936 (age 90) Pierceville, Indiana, U.S.
- Listed height: 6 ft 1 in (1.85 m)
- Listed weight: 150 lb (68 kg)

Career information
- High school: Milan (Milan, Indiana)
- College: Butler (1955–1958)
- NBA draft: 1958: undrafted
- Position: Point guard

Career history
- 1958–1961: Phillips 66ers

Career highlights
- Indiana Mr. Basketball (1954); Indiana Basketball Hall of Fame

Bobby Gene Plump (born September 9, 1936) is an American former member of the Milan High School basketball team, who won the Indiana High School Athletic Association (IHSAA) state tournament in 1954. Plump was selected Indiana's coveted "Mr. Basketball" in 1954, the award bestowed upon Indiana's most outstanding senior basketball player as voted on by the press. Plump was also named one of the most noteworthy Hoosiers of the 20th century by Indianapolis Monthly Magazine. He was also one of the 50 greatest sports figures from Indiana in the 20th century, according to Sports Illustrated.

After graduating from Butler University, Plump played three years for the Phillips 66ers of the National Industrial Basketball League. Following his professional sports career with Phillips 66, he began working in the life insurance and financial consulting industry. "Plump's Last Shot," a restaurant in the Broad Ripple neighborhood of Indianapolis, Indiana, honors him and is currently run by his son Jonathan.

Bobby Plump and his Milan High School teammates were part of the inspiration behind the 1986 film Hoosiers, starring Gene Hackman as coach of the fictitious Hickory Huskers. Hickory's star player, Jimmy Chitwood, takes his last-second shot in the championship game from the same spot Plump did in the 1954 state final.

== Honors and awards ==
- 1954 Indiana Mr. Basketball
- 1954 IHSAA State championship
- 1954 Trester Medal for Mental Attitude
- 1957 Most Valuable Player (Butler)
- 1958 Most Valuable Player (Butler)
- 1958 Member College Basketball All Star Team
- 1981 Indiana Basketball Hall of Fame Inductee
