= 1954 Milan High School basketball team =

1954 IHSAA Boys Basketball State Champions

The 1954 Milan High School Indians won the Indiana High School Boys Basketball Tournament championship in 1954.

With an enrollment of only 161, Milan was the smallest school to win a single-class state basketball title in Indiana, beating the team from the much larger Muncie Central High School in a classic competition known as the Milan Miracle. The team and town are the inspiration for the 1986 film Hoosiers. The team finished its regular season 19–2 and sported a 28–2 overall record.

== Background ==
Unlike most states, Indiana held a single-class tournament in which all schools competed for the same championship in one of America's largest and most popular high school tournaments, until the separation into enrollment classes in 1997. Indiana still possessed a large rural population well into the 1950s and rural school consolidation was still in its infancy. As a result, most Indiana high schools of the era had what today are considered extremely small enrollments. Many of these small schools had realistic expectations of advancing several rounds into the tournament in that era, but they would almost inevitably fall in the regionals to urban schools from places such as South Bend, Evansville, Gary, Terre Haute, Muncie, Bloomington, Lafayette, Fort Wayne, Anderson and Indianapolis.

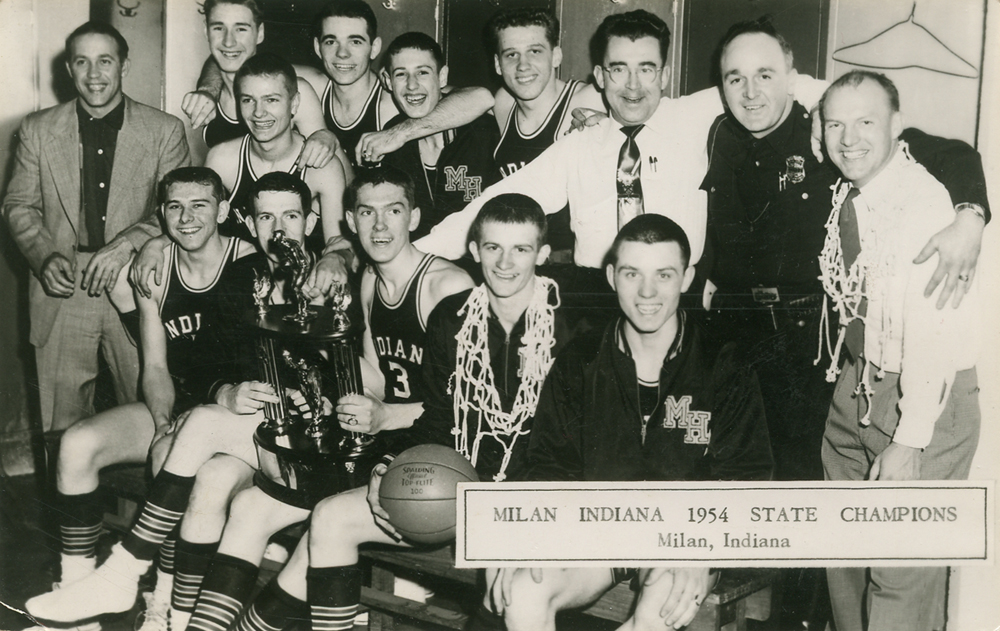
1954 Milan High School Basketball Team

Coach Marvin Wood had been hired two years earlier, at the age of 24, after a collegiate playing career at Butler University and a coaching stint in French Lick. His hiring was controversial, coming on the heels of Superintendent Willard Green's firing of coach Herman "Snort" Grinstead, who had ordered new uniforms without authorization. Wood's coaching style was the opposite of Grinstead's in many ways. He closed practice to outsiders, an act that removed one of the major forms of leisure time entertainment for the town's basketball-crazed population and angered many. He was impressed by the unusual scope of size and talent available in such a small school among the many boys trying out for the team, talent forged by a strong junior-high program. He taught them more patience than the run-and-gun Grinstead, culminating in a four-corner ball control offense he called the "cat-and-mouse".

Expectations were higher in the 1952–1953 season. These were realized as the Indians won their first regional game in school history under questionable circumstances against Morton Memorial, an orphanage school outside of Knightstown. In that game, Morton Memorial held a nine-point lead late in the game, only to lose in double-overtime as Milan's fourth quarter comeback was aided when the timekeeper delayed restarting the clock by a few seconds on one occasion. Milan went on to shock the state by winning the 1953 regional title and sweeping the semi-state to advance to the final four, finally bowing out in a 56–37 semifinal blowout to the Bears of South Bend Central High School. The nucleus of that team returned for the 1953–54 season with expectations of tournament success unprecedented for such a small school.

== The 1953–54 season ==
With four starters returning from the semifinalists, Milan was considered a lock to win both the Ripley County tournament and the sectional. To prepare for the rigors of tournament play, Milan scheduled several games against larger, more prestigious schools, including a tournament at Frankfort, where they would suffer their first loss of the season, a 49–47 nail-biter against the hosts. Milan cruised through the rest of the schedule before suffering a late-season upset to Aurora, who were also coming into a successful period in their basketball history.

=== Schedule ===
- Milan 52; Rising Sun 36 — W
- Milan 64; Vevay 41 — W
- Milan 48; Osgood 44 — W
- Milan 61; Seymour 43 — W
- Milan 24; Brookville 20 — W
- Milan 67; Hanover 36 — W
- Milan 50; Lawrenceburg 41 — W
- Milan 39; Versailles 35 — W
- Milan 47; Frankfort 49 — L
- Milan 52; Columbus 49 — W
- Milan 74; Rising Sun 60 — W
- Milan 52; Versailles 46 — W
- Milan 41; Napoleon 34 — W
- Milan 44; Holton 30 — W
- Milan 38; Hanover 33 — W
- Milan 61; Napoleon 29 — W
- Milan 42; Sunman 36 — W
- Milan 48; Versailles 42 — W
- Milan 38; North Vernon 37 — W
- Milan 45; Aurora 54 — L
- Milan 38; Osgood 30 — W

== 1954 IHSAA Boys Basketball Tournament ==
Anticipating a run deep into the later rounds of the Indiana High School Athletic Association boys basketball tournament, Milan expected to easily take the sectional before facing a tough test in the regional and a possible rematch against Aurora.

=== Sectional at Versailles ===
- Heavily favored to take the Versailles Sectional, Milan did not disappoint as the Indians crushed tiny Cross Plains before dispatching traditional rivals Versailles and Osgood to take their fifth sectional title.

Milan 83, Cross Plains 36

Milan 57, Versailles 43

Milan 44, Osgood 32

=== Regional at Rushville ===
- In the regional in Rushville, Milan easily dispatched their hosts before avenging a late-season loss to Aurora, advancing to the round of 16 for the second time in school history.

Milan 58, Rushville 34

Milan 46, Aurora 38

=== Semi-State at Butler Fieldhouse, Indianapolis ===
Milan 44, Montezuma 34

- In its first game in the Semi-State at Butler Fieldhouse in Indianapolis, Milan found itself in the unexpected position of playing Goliath to Montezuma's David, as the Aztecs, with an enrollment less than half of Milan's (79), shocked the state by advancing past the regional for the first time. Milan capitalized on the experience gained from their 1953 visit to Butler Fieldhouse and outlasted the Aztecs with a fourth quarter cat-and-mouse tactic to preserve the victory.

Milan 65, Indianapolis Crispus Attucks 52

- Attucks, led by sophomore guard and future Hall of Famer Oscar Robertson, had a 17–16 lead after one quarter before Milan jumped out to a seven-point halftime lead and preserved it by playing the cat-and-mouse throughout the second half. Attucks would go on to win the 1955 and 1956 titles.

=== State Finals at Butler Fieldhouse, Indianapolis ===
Milan 60, Terre Haute Gerstmeyer Tech 48

- Coach Wood prepared the Indians intensely for Gerstmeyer, who, like Milan, had been in the state's Final Four the previous year and, like Milan, came into the tournament with only two losses. Milan's defense held Arley Andrews to nine points as they coasted to victory.

Milan 32, Muncie Central 30

- Tied 26–26 in a defensive battle with heavily favored perennial power Muncie Central after three quarters, Bobby Plump, who had uncharacteristically shot only 2-for-10 from the field at that point, froze the ball unchallenged for over four minutes during the fourth quarter. Tied at 30, Plump hit a 14-footer from the right side as time expired to seal the win in a low-scoring defensive battle, denying the Bearcats a fifth state title.

The Indiana High School Athletic Association broke a longstanding tradition and awarded the Trester Award for mental attitude, sportsmanship, and character to a member of the winning team, Bobby Plump.

== Aftermath ==
40,000 people descended on Milan (population: 1,150) the next day as the team returned home from Indianapolis, lining State Road 101 for 13 miles (21 km) to congratulate the Indians.

As schools consolidated throughout Indiana, the days of small-town success gradually ended. Fewer than half of the 751 schools entered in the 1954 tournament exist today. With increased urbanization and suburbanization throughout the state, Indiana schools became much larger and the urban schools that had the most success in the tournament increased their domination of the tournament. No school with an enrollment less than five times that of Milan's won the tournament again under the one-class system that was replaced with a multi-class tournament in 1997. The smallest school to win the state tournament after Milan was Plymouth in 1982, led by future NBA star and coach Scott Skiles. Milan's enrollment is now over twice as large as it was in 1954.

Thirty-three years later, the film Hoosiers, a fictionalized account based on Milan's 1952–54 seasons, opened to positive reviews, renewing interest in the team and its legacy. The film combined game play from both the 1952–53 and 1953–54 seasons, merging the 1953 quarter-final opponent, the South Bend Bears, with the scoring pattern from the 1954 championship win against Muncie Central.

The 2010 run of Butler—a university team that to this day plays its home games in the same building that hosted Milan's historic victory—to the Final Four led to countless comparisons with both the 1954 Milan team and its cinematic alter ego of Hickory High. The Bulldogs stunned perennial power Michigan State 52–50 in the national semifinal to make it to the National Title Game, where they lost to Duke 61–59. (Butler forward Gordon Hayward narrowly missed a last-second half court shot that would have won the game, and the national championship, for Butler.) Appropriately, the Milan team, all but one of whom were alive at the time of the tournament, attended the Final Four (held just up the road at Lucas Oil Stadium in Indianapolis) as guests of Indiana governor Mitch Daniels.

== Team roster ==
- Ray Craft
- Kenny Delap
- William "Bill" Jordan
- Gene White
- Bobby Plump
- Ken Wendelman
- Bob Wichman
- Ron Truitt
- Glenn Butte
- Bob Engel
- Rollin Cutter
- Roger Schroder
- Fred Busching (manager)
- Marvin Wood (Head Coach)
