= Hoosiers (film) =

1986 film by David Anspaugh

- Theatrical release poster
- Directed by: David Anspaugh
- Written by: Angelo Pizzo
- Produced by: Carter DeHaven; Angelo Pizzo
- Starring: Gene Hackman; Barbara Hershey; Dennis Hopper
- Cinematography: Fred Murphy
- Edited by: Carroll Timothy O'Meara
- Music by: Jerry Goldsmith
- Production companies: Hemdale Pictures; De Haven Productions
- Distributed by: Orion Pictures
- Release date: November 14, 1986
- Running time: 115 minutes
- Country: United States
- Language: English
- Budget: $6 million
- Box office: $28.6 million

Hoosiers (released in some countries as Best Shot) is a 1986 American sports drama film written by Angelo Pizzo and directed by David Anspaugh in his feature directorial debut. It tells the story of a small-town Indiana high school basketball team and its journey to the state championship finals. It is inspired in part by the Milan High School team who won the 1954 state championship against Muncie Central High School.

Gene Hackman stars as Norman Dale, a new coach with a spotty past. The film co-stars Barbara Hershey and Dennis Hopper, whose role as the basketball-loving town drunk earned him an Academy Award nomination. Jerry Goldsmith was also nominated for an Academy Award for his score. Hoosiers was released by Orion Pictures on November 14, 1986. The film received positive reviews from critics and grossed $28.6 million against a $6 million budget. In 2001, Hoosiers was selected for preservation in the United States National Film Registry by the Library of Congress as being "culturally, historically, or aesthetically significant."

== Plot ==
In 1951, Norman Dale arrives in rural Hickory, Indiana. His old friend, high school principal Cletus Summers, has hired him as the civics and history teacher and as head basketball coach.

The townspeople, passionate about basketball, are disappointed that Hickory's best player, Jimmy Chitwood, has left the team following the death of the previous coach, who had been a surrogate father to Jimmy. At a meet-and-greet, Norman tells the townspeople he used to coach college basketball. The next day, fellow teacher Myra Fleener warns Norman not to recruit Jimmy. She is encouraging Jimmy to focus solely on his studies so that he will have a future away from Hickory.

The small school has only seven players. At the first practice, Norman dismisses Buddy Walker for rudeness, causing another player, Whit Butcher, to walk out in protest. Norman begins drilling the others (Rade Butcher, Merle Webb, Everett Flatch, Strap Purl, and equipment manager Ollie McLellan) with fundamentals and conditioning but no scrimmages or shooting, much to the Huskers' dismay. Whit later apologizes to the coach and rejoins the team.

Norman instructs the Huskers to pass four times before shooting. During the season opener, Rade disobeys and repeatedly makes baskets without passing first. The coach benches him for the rest of the game, even when Merle fouls out, leaving only four Huskers on the floor. In a subsequent game, when a rival player jabs Norman in the chest during an on-court argument, Rade jumps to his defense and hits the player. During the altercation, Cletus, acting as assistant coach, suffers a mild heart attack. Norman further erodes community support by employing a slow, defensive style that does not immediately produce results. The coach also loses his temper on court and gets ejected from two games.

With Cletus laid up, Norman asks former Husker Wilbur "Shooter" Flatch, Everett's alcoholic father, to be his assistant coach, with the requirement that Shooter be sober during all games and practices. Shooter agrees, on the condition that Norman not get ejected from any more games. The choice of Shooter confounds the town and embarrasses Everett.

Mid-season, disgruntled townspeople decide to vote on dismissing Norman. Before the meeting, Myra, sensing something amiss regarding Norman's past, uncovers years-old information about his hitting a player and being banned from coaching. At the meeting, Myra goes up to the lectern, intending to read aloud the article she found, but she changes her mind and instead asks the townspeople to give Norman another chance. Nevertheless, they vote to fire the coach. Then Jimmy Chitwood arrives and announces he will rejoin the team, but only if Norman remains as coach. A new vote is taken, and the residents overwhelmingly choose to keep him.

After Jimmy's return, the reinvigorated Huskers rack up a series of wins. To prove to the townspeople (and to Shooter himself) Shooter's value to the team, Norman intentionally gets ejected from a game. This forces Shooter to devise a play that helps Hickory win on a last-second shot. Shooter also regains the respect of his son, Everett.

Despite a setback when Shooter relapses, the team advances through the state tournament with Jimmy's strong performance. Unsung players, such as short Ollie and devoutly religious Strap, also contribute. Hickory reaches the championship game in Indianapolis. At Butler Fieldhouse, and before the largest crowd they have ever seen, the Huskers face long odds to defeat the heavily favored South Bend Central Bears, who have taller and more athletic players. After falling behind, Hickory fights their way back and ties the game with just a few seconds left. Norman calls a timeout and sets up a play where Jimmy will be a decoy for Merle, who will take the last shot. The Huskers look uncomfortable, and when Norman demands to know what's wrong, Jimmy simply says, "I'll make it." Norman nods in approval and sets up a new play for Jimmy. He scores just before the buzzer sounds, securing the victory for Hickory, the smallest school to ever win the Indiana state championship.

Sometime in the future, a boy shoots baskets in Hickory's home gym. A large black-and-white team portrait with their state championship trophy is seen hanging on the wall, and a voiceover from Coach Dale states, "I love you guys."

== Cast ==
- Gene Hackman as Coach Norman Dale
- Barbara Hershey as Myra Fleener
- Dennis Hopper as Wilbur "Shooter" Flatch
- Sheb Wooley as Cletus Summers
- Maris Valainis as Jimmy Chitwood
- David Neidorf as Everett Flatch
- Brad Long as Buddy Walker
- Steve Hollar as Rade Butcher
- Brad Boyle as Whit Butcher
- Wade Schenck as Ollie McLellan
- Kent Poole as Merle Webb
- Scott Summers as Strap Purl
- Fern Persons as Opal Fleener
- Chelcie Ross as George Walker
- Robert Swan as Rollin Butcher
- Michael Sassone as Preacher Purl
- Gloria Dorson as Millie
- Michael O'Guinne as Rooster
- Wil Dewitt as Reverend Doty
- John Robert Thompson as Sheriff Finley
- Hilliard Gates as Radio Announcer

== Inspiration ==
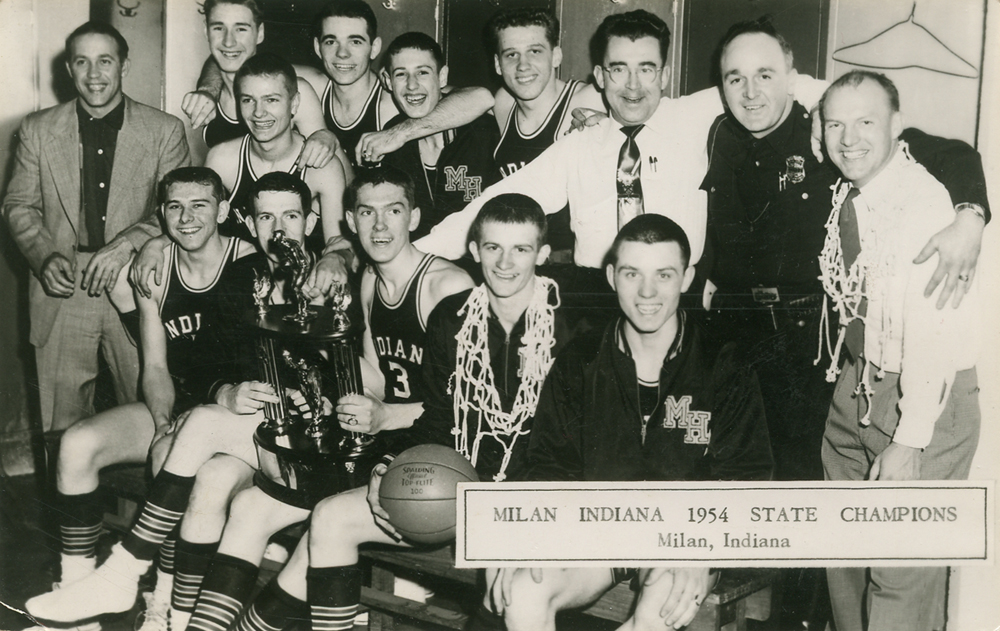
Milan High School Basketball Team, 1954.

The film is inspired in part by the story of the 1954 Indiana state champions, Milan High School (/ˈmaɪlən/ MY-lən). The phrase "inspired by a true story" is more appropriate than "based on a true story" because the two teams have little in common.

In most U.S. states, high school athletic teams are divided into different classes, usually based on the number of enrolled students, with separate state championship tournaments held for each classification. In 1954, Indiana conducted a single state basketball tournament for all its high schools. This practice continued until 1997.

Some plot points are similar to Milan's real story. Like the film's fictional Hickory High School, Milan was a very small high school in a rural, southern Indiana town. Both schools had undersized teams. Both Hickory and Milan won the state finals by 2 points: Hickory won 42–40, and Milan won 32–30. The last seconds of the Hoosiers state final are fairly close to the details of Milan's 1954 final; the last basket in the film was made from virtually the same spot on the floor as Bobby Plump's actual game-winner. The movie's final game was filmed in the same gymnasium that hosted the 1954 Indiana state championship game, Butler University's Hinkle Fieldhouse (called Butler Fieldhouse in 1954) in Indianapolis.

Unlike the film's plot, the 1954 Milan Indians came into the season as heavy favorites and finished the '53–'54 regular season at 19–2. In addition, the 1952–1953 team went to the state semifinals, and they were considered a powerhouse going into the championship season despite the school's small enrollment.

== Production ==
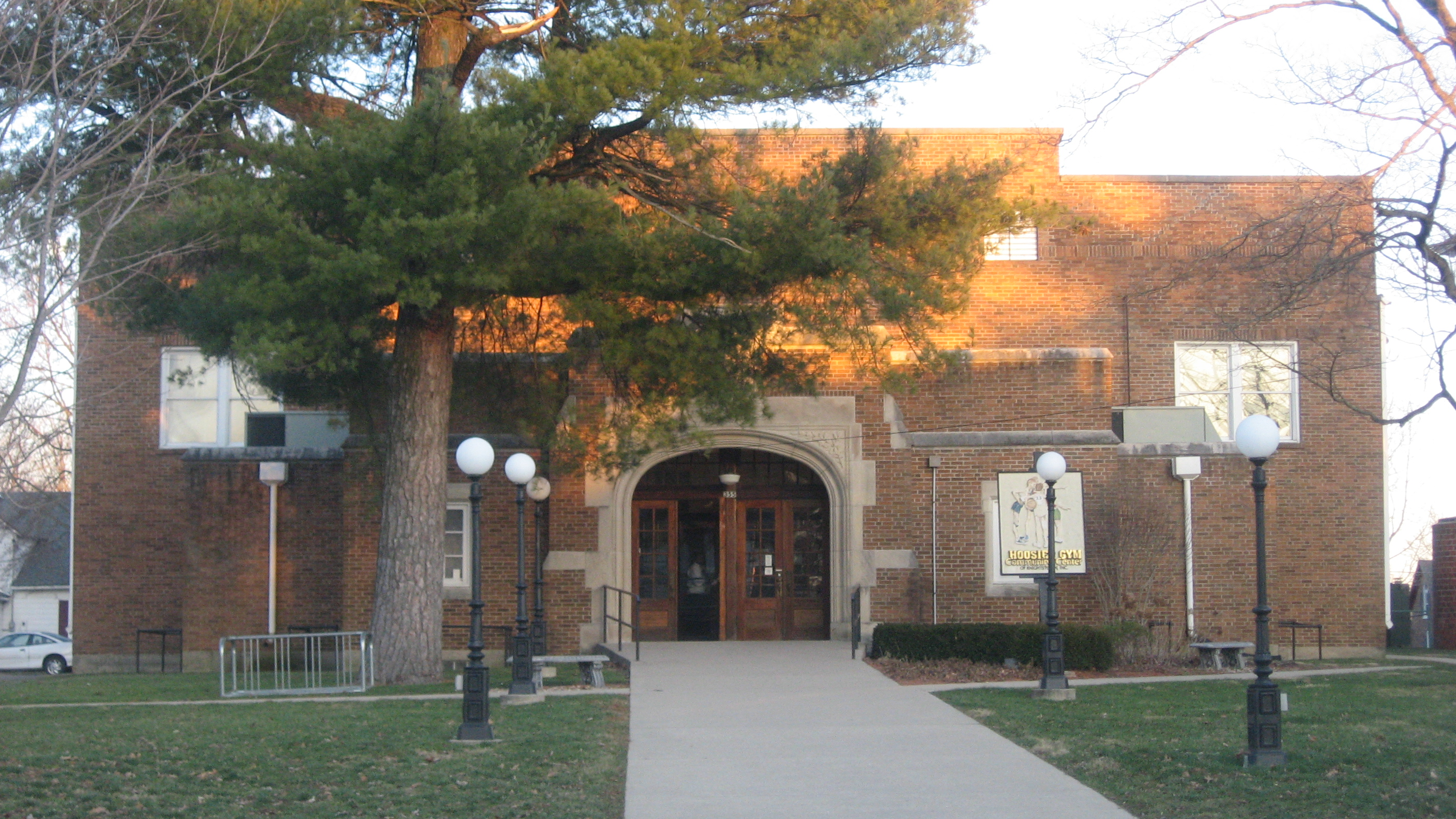
Hickory's gymnasium

During filming in the autumn of 1985, on location at Hinkle Fieldhouse, directors were unable to secure enough extras for shooting the final scenes even after casting calls through the Indianapolis media. To help fill the stands, they invited two local high schools to move a game to the Fieldhouse. Broad Ripple and Chatard, the alma mater of Maris Valainis who played the role of Jimmy Chitwood, obliged, and crowd shots were filmed during their actual game. Fans of both schools came out in period costumes to serve as extras and to supplement the hundreds of locals who had answered the call. At halftime and following the game, actors took to the court to shoot footage of the state championship scenes, including the game-winning shot by Hickory.

The film's producers chose New Richmond, Indiana to serve as the fictional town of Hickory and recorded most of the film's location shots in and around the community. Signs on the roads into New Richmond still recall its role in the film. In addition, the old schoolhouse in Nineveh was used for the majority of the classroom scenes and many other scenes throughout the film.

The home court of Hickory is located in Knightstown and is now known as the "Hoosier Gym."

Pizzo and Anspaugh shopped the script for two years before they finally found investment for the project. Despite this seeming approval, the financiers approved a production budget of only $6 million, forcing the crew to hire most of the cast playing the Hickory basketball team and many of the extras from the local community around New Richmond. Gene Hackman also predicted that the film would be a "career killer." Despite the small budget, dire predictions, and little help from distributor Orion Pictures, Hoosiers grossed over $28 million and received two Oscar nominations (Dennis Hopper for Best Supporting Actor and Jerry Goldsmith for Best Original Score).

Shortly after the film's release, five of the actors who portrayed basketball players in the film were suspended by the NCAA from their real-life college basketball teams for three games. The NCAA determined that they had been paid to play basketball, making them ineligible.

An extended director's cut, restoring 18 minutes of additional footage under the supervision of Pizzo, will play on Regal screens across the Midwest for one day on November 29, before later streaming on Amazon Prime.

== Soundtrack ==
Hoosiers (Best Shot)

Soundtrack album by Jerry Goldsmith
- Released: 1987
- Recorded: 1986
- Genre: Soundtrack
- Length: 39:33

Hoosiers (Original MGM Motion Picture Soundtrack)

Soundtrack album by Jerry Goldsmith
- Released: 2012
- Recorded: 1986
- Genre: Soundtrack
- Length: 59:48

The music to Hoosiers was written by veteran composer Jerry Goldsmith. Goldsmith used a hybrid of orchestral and electronic elements in juxtaposition to the 1950s setting to score the film. He also helped tie the music to the film by using recorded hits of basketballs on a gymnasium floor to serve as additional percussion sounds. Washington Post film critic Paul Attanasio praised the soundtrack, writing, "And it's marvelously (and innovatively) scored (by composer Jerry Goldsmith), who weaves together electronics with symphonic effects to create a sense of the rhythmic energy of basketball within a traditional setting."

The score gained Goldsmith an Oscar nomination for Best Original Score, though he ultimately lost to Herbie Hancock for Round Midnight. Goldsmith would later work with filmmakers Angelo Pizzo and David Anspaugh again on their successful 1993 sports film Rudy.

Until 2012, the soundtrack was primarily available under the European title Best Shot, with several of the film's cues not included on the album. In 2012, Intrada Records released Goldsmith's complete score, marking the first time the soundtrack has been released on CD in the United States.

== Reception ==
=== Critical response ===
On Rotten Tomatoes the film holds an approval rating of 85% based on 117 reviews. The website's critics consensus reads: "It may adhere to the sports underdog formula, but Hoosiers has been made with such loving craft, and features such excellent performances, that it's hard to resist." Metacritic assigned the film a weighted average score of 76 out of 100, based on 13 critics, indicating "generally favorable reviews." Audiences polled by CinemaScore gave the film an average grade of "A" on A+ to F scale.

Chicago Sun-Times critic Roger Ebert praised the film, writing: "What makes Hoosiers special is not its story but its details and its characters. Angelo Pizzo, who wrote the original screenplay, knows small-town sports. He knows all about high school politics and how the school board and the parents' groups always think they know more about basketball than the coach does. He knows about gossip, scandal and vengeance. And he knows a lot about human nature. All of his knowledge, however, would be pointless without Hackman's great performance at the center of this movie. Hackman is gifted at combining likability with complexity — two qualities that usually don't go together in the movies. He projects all of the single-mindedness of any good coach, but then he contains other dimensions, and we learn about the scandal in his past that led him to this one-horse town. David Anspaugh's direction is good at suggesting Hackman's complexity without belaboring it." The New York Times' Janet Maslin echoed Ebert's sentiments, writing, "This film's very lack of surprise and sophistication accounts for a lot of its considerable charm."

Washington Post critics Rita Kempley and Paul Attanasio both enjoyed the film, despite its perceived sentimentalism and lack of originality. Kempley wrote, "Even though we've seen it all before, Hoosiers scores big by staying small." Attanasio pointed out some problems with the film: "[It contains] some klutzy glitches in continuity, and a love story (between Hackman and a sterile, one-note Barbara Hershey) that goes nowhere. The action photography flattens the visual excitement of basketball (you can imagine what a Scorsese would do with it);" but he noted the film's "enormous craftsmanship accumulates till you're actually seduced into believing all its Pepperidge Farm buncombe. That's quite an achievement."

Time magazine's Richard Schickel praised the performance of Gene Hackman, writing that he was

wonderful as an inarticulate man tense with the struggle to curb a flaring, mysterious anger.

Variety wrote that the

pic belongs to Hackman, but Dennis Hopper gets another opportunity to put in a showy turn as a local misfit.

Pat Graham of the Chicago Reader was a rare dissenter, writing of the film that

Director David Anspaugh seems only marginally concerned with basketball thematics: what matters most is feeding white-bread fantasies (the film is set in the slow-footed 50s, when blacks are only a rumor and nobody's ever heard of slam 'n' jam) and laying on the inspirational corn.... Bobby Knight would not be amused, though Tark the Shark might've had a good laugh at the naive masquerade.

Chicago Tribune critic Gene Siskel also criticized the film, calling it sentimental and predictable.

=== Accolades ===
Hoosiers has been named by many publications as the best or one of the best sports movies ever made.

Hoosiers was ranked number 13 by the American Film Institute on its 100 Years... 100 Cheers list of most inspirational films. The film was the choice of the readers of USA Today as the best sports movie of all time. In 2001, Hoosiers was selected for preservation in the United States National Film Registry by the Library of Congress as being "culturally, historically, or aesthetically significant" due in part to an especially large number of nominations from Indiana citizens.

In June 2008, AFI revealed its "Ten Top Ten" — the best ten films in ten classic American film genres — after polling over 1,500 people from the creative community. Hoosiers was acknowledged as the fourth best film in the sports genre.

A museum to commemorate the real-life achievements of the 1954 Milan team has been established.

In 2015, MGM partnered with the Indiana Pacers to create Hickory uniforms inspired by the film. The Pacers first wore the tribute uniforms during select games in the 2015–16 NBA regular season in honor of the film's 30th anniversary.

In April 2017, Vice President (and former governor of Indiana) Mike Pence said that Hoosiers is the "greatest sports movie ever made" while traveling on a flight from Indonesia to Australia with a pool of journalists.

American Film Institute Lists

- 2006: AFI's 100 Years...100 Cheers - #13
- 2008: AFI's 10 Top 10 – #4 Sports Film

== See also ==
- Hoosier
- Hoosier Hysteria
- Hoosier Gym
- List of basketball films
