= Milan High School (Indiana) =

Location
- 609 N Warpath Drive; Milan, Indiana 47031; United States; 39°07′44″N 85°07′41″W

Information
- Type: Public high school
- School district: Milan Community Schools
- Principal: Ryan Langferman
- Teaching staff: 36.00 (FTE)
- Grades: 9 - 12
- Enrollment: 495 (2023–2024)
- Student to teacher ratio: 13.75
- Colors: Black and Gold
- Athletics conference: Ohio River Valley Conference
- Mascot: Indian/Lady Indian
- Website: www.milan.k12.in.us/o/mhs

Milan High School (/ˈmaɪlən/ MY-lən) is a small high school located in Milan, Indiana, and is a part of the Milan Community Schools district which covers Franklin and Washington townships in eastern Ripley County.

== Courses ==
Milan High School offers a variety of courses in the general and advanced levels. Dual-credit college classes are available as well.

== Athletics ==
The Milan Indians compete in the Ohio River Valley Conference in the following sports:

- Baseball
- Basketball
- Cross Country
- Football
- Golf
- Soccer
- Softball
- Swimming
- Tennis
- Track and Field
- Volleyball
- Wrestling

== State Championships ==
- Boys' basketball: 1954
- Track & Field 1600m individual: 2001
- Boys' baseball State Runner-up: 1999

=== 1954 State Basketball Champions ===
Milan High School is most famous for its 1954 basketball team, which won the Indiana state championship against Muncie Central High School, a school ten times its size. The 1986 movie Hoosiers is based on the story of this team, which had lost in the semifinals the preceding year.
