= Muncie Central High School =

Location
- 801 North Walnut Street; Muncie, Indiana 47305; United States
- 40°12′04″N 85°23′16″W

Information
- Type: Public high school
- Established: 1868
- School district: Muncie Community Schools
- Principal: Chris Walker
- Teaching staff: 85.00 (on an FTE basis)
- Grades: 9–12
- Enrollment: 1,348 (2023–2024)
- Student to teacher ratio: 15.86
- Colors: Purple and white
- Nickname: Bearcats
- Website: chs.muncie.k12.in.us

Muncie Central High School (MCHS) in Muncie, Indiana is a public high school. Opened in 1868, the school is today part of the Muncie Community Schools Corporation.

It is the sole comprehensive high school of its school district, which covers the vast majority of Muncie.

== History ==
Opened in 1868, Muncie High School produced a first graduating class of six students. In 1915 it moved to a four-story building on South High Street in Muncie. In the early 1920s, it was one of Indiana's first schools to adopt a mascot.

Henry Peacock taught history at the school and served as its principal from 1910 to 1912. He and Lena Peacock constructed Peacock Apartments, a historic building in Muncie.

In 1974, the school moved to its present location on Walnut Street in downtown Muncie. The school was originally open concept with almost no interior walls, but it has since been remodeled to a traditional format.

After the 2013–2014 school year, Muncie Central merged with Muncie Southside High School to form one high school.

In November 2021, students at Muncie Central organized Black Lives Matter protests, held outside of the school. The controversy began after police officers working at the school were offended by a pro-BLM poster, created by a 16-year-old student for a school project and hung in the hallway by a teacher. School administrators decided to move the posters into the teacher's classroom and the officers were transferred to other buildings. The decision was viewed by students as a violation of their freedom of speech. The protests made Muncie Central cancel several in-person school days while an investigation into the events took place. The protests at Muncie Central gained nationwide media attention.

== Athletics ==
The Muncie boys team won the Indiana High School Boys Basketball Tournament (IHSAA) in 1928, 1931, 1951, 1952, 1963, 1978, 1979 and 1988. The boys team won the IHSAA cross country championship in 1956, 1958 and 1967. The girls volleyball team won the state tournament in 1998, 1999, 2000, 2003, 2005 and 2010.

Muncie Central High School also is the site of the Muncie Fieldhouse, the fourth-largest high school gym in the United States.

== Music ==
As a participant in Indiana State Fair Band Day, the Muncie Central marching band, known as The Spirit of Muncie Band and Guard since 2014, has been crowned Champion four times: 1953, 2014, 2021, and 2024.

Prior to merging with Muncie Central High School in 2014, Muncie Southside High School won six Band Day Championships in a ten-year span, including three consecutive years (2000, 2002–4, 2006, 2008). Muncie Southside finished first or second at the State Fair in 12 of 13 years, starting in 2000 and concluding with their final competition in 2013.

== Notable alumni ==
- Ron Bonham: basketball player, 1960 Indiana Mr. Basketball, 2-time NCAA national champion with University of Cincinnati, drafted by Boston Celtics in 1964, 2-time NBA champion.
- Benjamin V. Cohen (attended Muncie schools through 11th grade): a member of the administrations of Franklin D. Roosevelt and Harry S. Truman; had a public service career that spanned from the early New Deal to after the Vietnam War.
- Mary Jane Croft: American actress best known for her roles as Betty Ramsey on I Love Lucy, Ms. Daisy Enright on Our Miss Brooks, Mary Jane Lewis on The Lucy Show and Here's Lucy, and Clara Randolph on The Adventures of Ozzie and Harriet.
- Jim Davis: basketball player for University of Colorado, selected 27th overall in 1964 NBA draft, played for Atlanta Hawks, Houston Rockets and Detroit Pistons.
- Bill Dinwiddie: basketball player with NBA's Cincinnati Royals, Boston Celtics, and Milwaukee Bucks (1967–1972).
- Eddie Faulkner: current Running Backs coach for the NFL's Pittsburgh Steelers.
- John Isenbarger: wide receiver for NFL's San Francisco 49ers (1970–1973).
- Ryan Kerrigan: Purdue University football player drafted Round 1: Pick 16 to the NFL's Washington Commanders, also played for the Philadelphia Eagles for 1 season before announcing retirement after the 2021 season.
- Ray McCallum: two-time state basketball champion at Muncie Central; one of only two retired basketball jerseys for Ball State; selected by Indiana Pacers in 1983 NBA draft; head basketball coach of University of Detroit 2008–16.
- Bonzi Wells: basketball player for NBA's Portland Trail Blazers, Memphis Grizzlies, Sacramento Kings, Houston Rockets and New Orleans Hornets.

== See also ==
- List of high schools in Indiana
