= Vandivier =

Vandivier is a surname. Notable people with the surname include:

- Fuzzy Vandivier (1903–1983), American basketball player
- Norman Francis Vandivier (1916–1942), American naval aviator
- Rick Vandivier (born 1954), American jazz guitarist and composer

== See also ==
- Vandiver (disambiguation)
- USS Vandivier (DER-540), John C. Butler-class destroyer escort of the United States Navy
