= Chuck Harmon =

American baseball player (1924–2019)

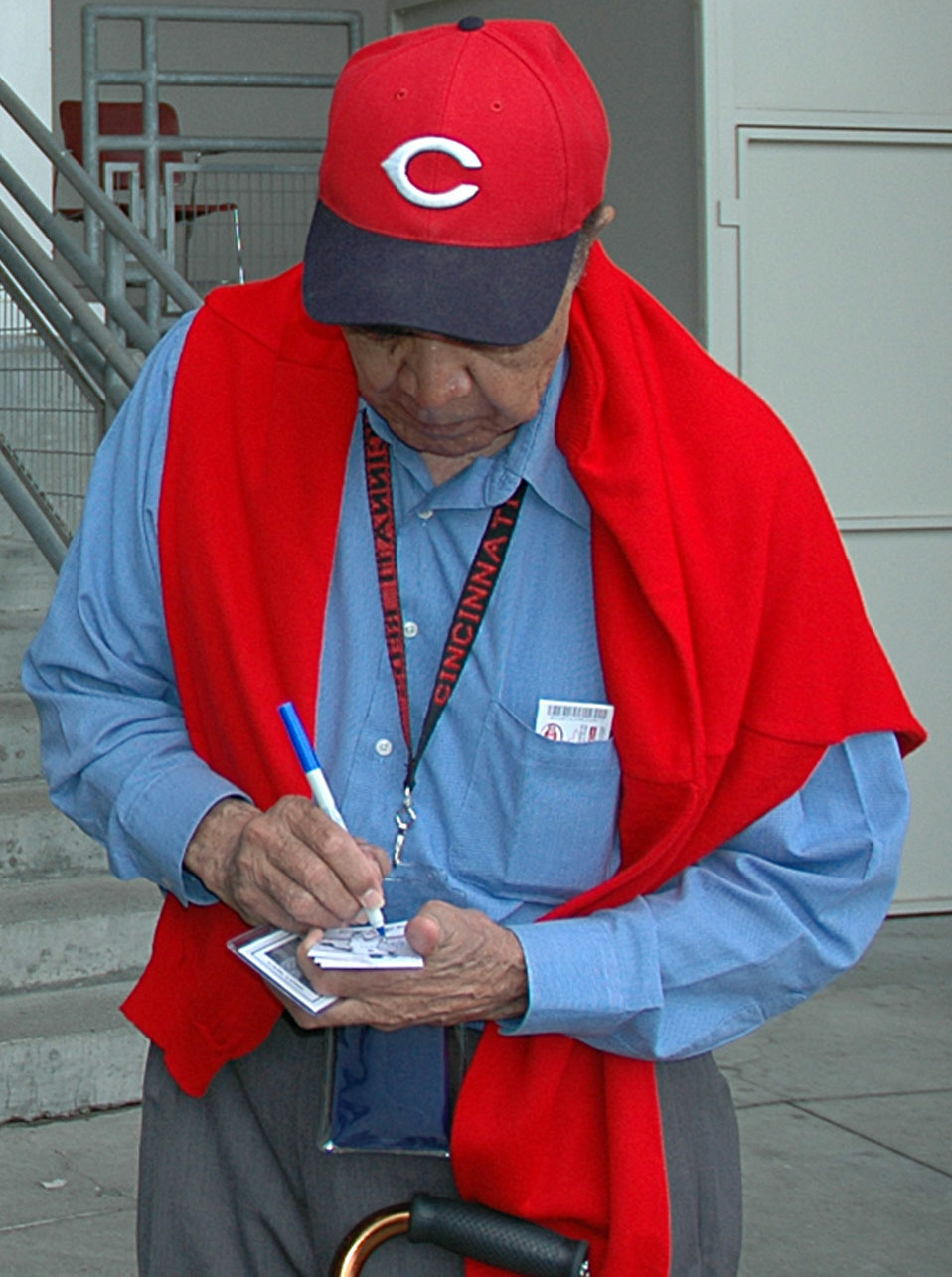
- Harmon at Great American Ballpark in 2008
- Third baseman / Outfielder
- Born: April 23, 1924; Washington, Indiana, U.S.
- Died: March 19, 2019 (aged 94); Golf Manor, Ohio, U.S.
- Batted: Right Threw: Right

Professional debut
- NgL: 1947, for the Indianapolis Clowns
- MLB: April 17, 1954, for the Cincinnati Redlegs

Last MLB appearance
- September 15, 1957, for the Philadelphia Phillies

MLB statistics
- Batting average: .238
- Home runs: 7
- Runs batted in: 59
- Stats at Baseball Reference

Teams
- Indianapolis Clowns (1947); Cincinnati Redlegs (1954–1956); St. Louis Cardinals (1956–1957); Philadelphia Phillies (1957)
Military career
Allegiance	United States
Branch	United States Navy
Service years	1943–1945
Conflicts	World War II

Charles Byron Harmon (April 23, 1924 – March 19, 2019) was an American professional baseball utility player in Major League Baseball (MLB), who played for the Cincinnati Redlegs (1954–1956), St. Louis Cardinals (1956–1957), and Philadelphia Phillies (1957). He batted and threw right-handed.

== Early life ==
The tenth of twelve children, Chuck Harmon was schooled as an athlete at Dunbar Elementary by legendary Franklin Wonder Five basketball player Burl Friddle, Harmon played for the Washington High School Hatchets, who won two consecutive Indiana state basketball championships in 1941 and 1942. His brother Bill also played for the 1941 team.

Harmon served in the Navy during World War II spending all 3 years stateside at the Great Lakes Naval Training Station, playing baseball.

== College career ==
Harmon and longtime teammate and friend Art Grove then reunited with Friddle to play for the University of Toledo, where they helped an all-freshman squad (that included Gary, Indiana's Davage Minor) advance to the championship game of the National Invitation Tournament (NIT), losing to St. John's. Grove and Minor went on to play professional basketball. After a three-year stint in the U.S. Navy, Harmon returned to the University of Toledo, where he served as the Rockets' co-captain in both the 1947–48 and 1948–49 seasons. Harmon was also a baseball star for the Rockets. During the summer of 1947, Harmon briefly played professional baseball with the Negro league Indianapolis Clowns, using the alias "Charlie Fine" to preserve his collegiate eligibility.

== Professional basketball ==
For its 1950–51 season, the National Basketball Association (NBA) was integrated. Harmon tried out for the Boston Celtics but was cut along with Isaac "Rabbit" Walthour, another black star, although Chuck Cooper did make the Celtics squad. Harmon finished that season as player-coach of Utica in the American Basketball League, becoming one of, if not the first, African-American to coach an integrated professional basketball team.

== Professional baseball ==
On April 17, 1954, he became the first African American to play for the Cincinnati Reds' franchise, known during the mid-1950s as the Redlegs. Pinch-hitting for pitcher Corky Valentine against Lew Burdette, Harmon flied out in the seventh inning of a 5–1 loss to the Milwaukee Braves at County Stadium. In that game he came to bat after another rookie, Nino Escalera, an Afro-Latin American from Puerto Rico who pinch hit immediately before Harmon to become the first black player to appear for the Cincinnati franchise.

Harmon got his first hit on April 25, 1954. Starting and leading off for the Reds at home in Crosley Field in a 3–2 win over the Chicago Cubs, Harmon singled in the first inning off Howie Pollet. He later doubled and scored on an error, and drew one walk. His final game was the site of his first, Milwaukee's County Stadium on September 15, 1957, where, appearing as a pinch runner for the Philadelphia Phillies, he scored his final run on a double play.

Harmon hit over .300 during five consecutive minor league seasons but never approached such numbers in the majors. He also played for the Cardinals and Phillies.

In between, Harmon played winter ball in Puerto Rico with the Leones de Ponce and Criollos de Caguas clubs in the 1953–54 and 1955–56 seasons, respectively, while appearing with the Puerto Rican champion Caguas in the 1956 Caribbean Series.

In a four-season major league career, Harmon was a .238 hitter with seven home runs and 59 RBI in 289 games played. After his Major League career ended, he played four seasons in the minors, from 1958 to 1961 in AAA leagues for five teams.

Following his playing career, Harmon worked as a scout with the Cleveland Indians and Atlanta Braves in baseball, and the Indiana Pacers in basketball. Later he worked as an administrative assistant for the Hamilton County Court System in Cincinnati, Ohio. He remained active in SWAP (Seniors With A Purpose) and other youth-related services.

== Personal life ==
In 1977, Harmon was inducted as part of the inaugural class of the University of Toledo Athletic Hall of Fame. He was inducted into the Indiana Baseball Hall of Fame in 1995.

In 1997, Golf Manor, Ohio (a suburb of Cincinnati) renamed one of its streets "Chuck Harmon Way" after its longtime resident. In addition, in cooperation with the Cincinnati Reds, a renovated ball field was named in his honor in the multi-use municipal Volunteer Park.

On April 20, 2004 (the 50th anniversary of Harmon's debut as the Cincinnati Reds' first African-American player), the Reds honored him during Chuck Harmon Recognition Night at Great American Ball Park. The pregame ceremonies included the unveiling of a special historic plaque, which now hangs near the entrance of the ballpark.

Harmon was married for 62 years to his wife, Daurel "Pearl" Harmon, who died in November 2009, two days before her 83rd birthday. They had three children.

Harmon died March 19, 2019.

== See also ==
- List of Negro league baseball players who played in Major League Baseball
- List of first black Major League Baseball players by team and date
