= Burl Friddle =

American coach and college athletics administrator (1900–1978)

Biographical details
- Born: May 27, 1900; Indianapolis, Indiana, U.S.
- Died: October 11, 1978 (aged 78); Franklin, Indiana, U.S.

Playing career

Men's basketball
- 1921–1925: Franklin
- Position: Center

Coaching career (HC unless noted)

Men's basketball
- 1925–1935: Washington HS (IN)
- 1935–1942: South Side HS (IN)
- 1942–1944: Toledo
- 1948–1949: Indianapolis Jets
- 1951–1952: Pike HS (IN)

Administrative career (AD unless noted)
- 1943–1944: Toledo

Head coaching record
- Overall: 27–17 (college); 14–29 (BAA)

Accomplishments and honors

Championships
- As player: 1x Indiana High School Boys Basketball Tournament championship (1920); As coach: 2x Indiana High School Boys Basketball Tournament championship (1930, 1938)

Burl Rush Friddle (May 27, 1900 – October 11, 1978) was an American basketball player and coach. He was a member of the Franklin Wonder Five that won the Indiana high school boys basketball championship and went undefeated during the 1922–23 college basketball season. As a coach, he won two Indiana state championships and led a team of freshmen to the finals of the National Invitation Tournament.

== Playing ==
Friddle played center on the Franklin High School basketball team that won the 1920 Indiana high school boys basketball championship. He then attended Franklin College, where, in 1922, he was joined by his high school coach, Ernest "Griz" Wagner, and many of his Franklin High teammates. During the next three seasons, Franklin College lost only two games and won two state collegiate championships (1923 and 1924).

== Coaching ==
In 1925, Friddle was an assistant coach for the Washington High School basketball team. As Friddle was still a student at Franklin College, this was a violation of Indiana High School Athletic Association rules and led to the team being suspended for that year's state basketball tournament. After graduating, Friddle became Washington's head coach and led the school to the state championship in 1930. In 1935, he became the head coach at South Side High School in Fort Wayne, Indiana, where he compiled a record of 106–40 and won a second state championship in 1938.

Member of the Franklin Wonder Five, left to right: Burl Friddle, Ralph Hicks, Paul White, Robert "Fuzzy" Vandivier, Sima Comer, Johnny Gant, Harold Borden, Pete Keeling, coach Ernest "Griz" Wagner.

In 1942, Friddle became head men's basketball coach at the University of Toledo. Due to World War II, Toledo was forced to play an all-freshman team consisting of players Friddle recruited from his home state of Indiana. Despite this, the Rockets, led by Dave Minor, Chuck Harmon, Art Grove, and Dal Zuber, won 22 of 24 regular season games and made it to the 1943 National Invitation Tournament, where they defeated Manhattan and Washington & Jefferson before losing to St. John's in the championship game. On May 20, 1943, Friddle was named Toledo's athletic director.

After the 1943–44 season, Friddle returned to Franklin to become an insurance agent. In 1948, he was named head coach of the Basketball Association of America's Indianapolis Jets after the team traded away player-coach Bruce Hale. He led the Jets to a 14–29 record and the team folded at the end of the season. From 1951 to 1952, he was the head coach at Pike High School.

== Later life ==
Friddle continued to sell insurance until his retirement in the early 1970s. He died on October 11, 1978, at the age of 78. He was survived by his wife and three children.

== Head coaching record ==
Legend
Regular season	G	Games coached	W	Games won	L	Games lost	W–L %	Win–loss %
Playoffs	PG	Playoff games	PW	Playoff wins	PL	Playoff losses	PW–L %	Playoff win–loss %

Team	Year	G	W	L	W–L%	Finish	PG	PW	PL	PW–L%	Result
Indianapolis	1948–49	43	14	29	.326	6th in Western	—	—	—	—	Missed playoffs
