= Vandiver =

Vandiver may refer to:

== People ==
- Beverly J. Vandiver, American psychologist
- Elizabeth Vandiver (born 1956), American classical scholar
- Ernest Vandiver (1918–2005), American politician, governor of Georgia
- Frank E. Vandiver (1925–2005), American historian and university president
- Fuzzy Vandivier (1903–1983), American high school and collegiate basketball player
- Harry Vandiver (1882–1973), American mathematician
- J. Kim Vandiver (born 1945), American MIT professor and engineer
- Jane Kidd (politician) (born 1953), née Vandiver, American retired politician
- Jerry Vandiver, American songwriter and musician
- Jim Vandiver (1939–2015), American race car driver
- Murray Vandiver (1845–1916), American politician and Treasurer of Maryland
- Pendleton Vandiver (1869–1932), American fiddler
- Robert R. Vandiver (1805–1885), American politician and contractor
- Shaun Vandiver (born 1968), American basketball player
- Willard Duncan Vandiver (1854–1932), American politician

== Places in the United States ==
- Vandiver, Alabama, a census-designated place and unincorporated community
- Vandiver, Missouri, a village

== See also ==
- Vandivier
