= Hoosier hysteria =

Excitement surrounding basketball in Indiana

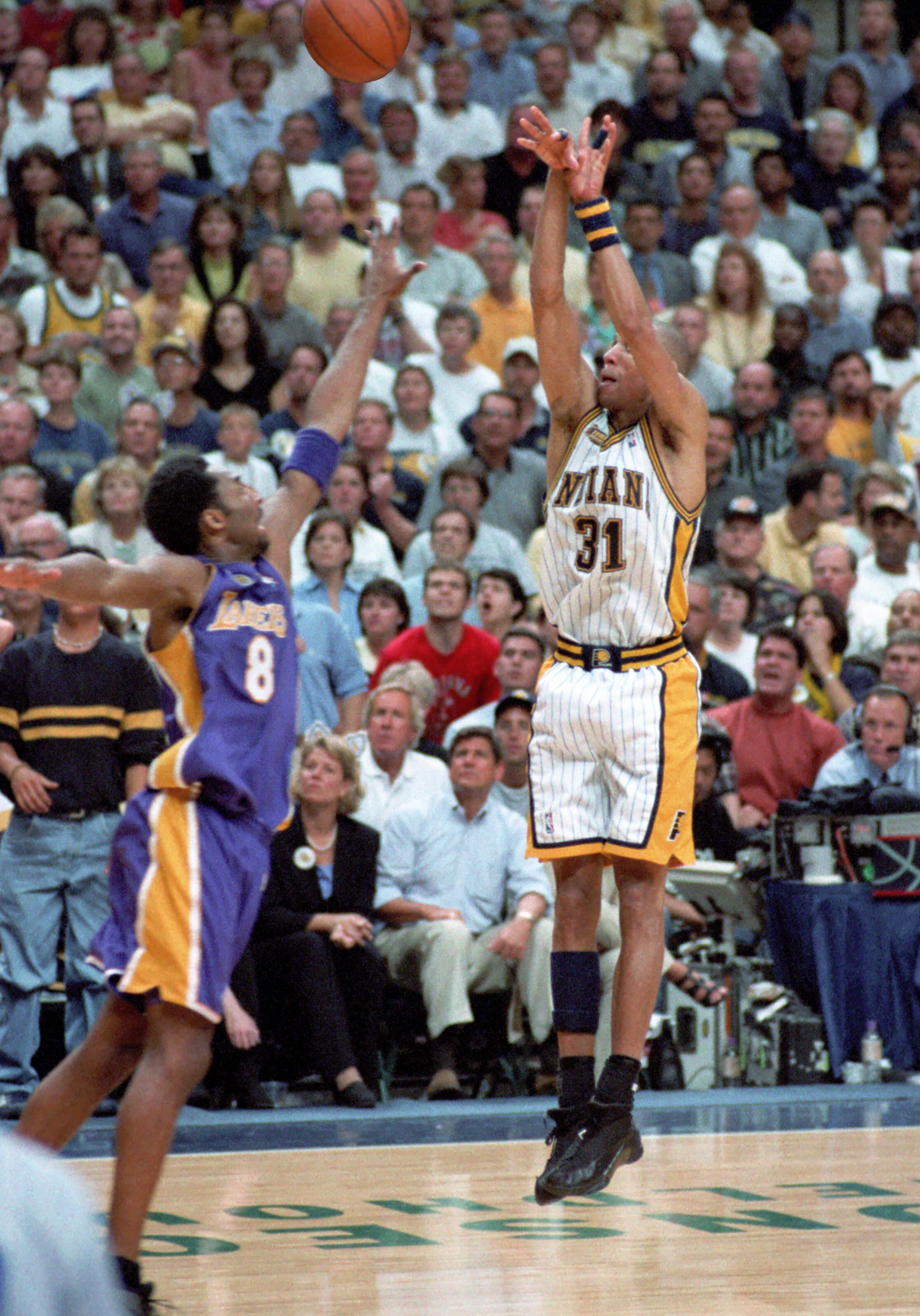
Indiana Pacers shooting guard Reggie Miller shooting over Kobe Bryant during Game 5 of the 2000 NBA Finals

Hoosier hysteria is the excitement surrounding basketball in the U.S. state of Indiana. This excitement generally revolves around the Indiana High School Boys Basketball Tournament, the Indiana Hoosiers men's basketball team of Indiana University (IU), the Purdue Boilermakers men's basketball team of Purdue University, the Butler Bulldogs men's basketball team of Butler University, the Indiana Pacers of the National Basketball Association (NBA) and the Indiana Fever of the Women's National Basketball Association (WNBA).

Indiana's passion for basketball was observed and written about by basketball's inventor, James Naismith. In 1925, Naismith visited an Indiana basketball state finals game along with 15,000 screaming fans. He later wrote that while it was invented in Massachusetts, "basketball really had its origin in Indiana, which remains the center of the sport". In the 1954 Indiana High School Boys Basketball Tournament, underdog Milan, with just an enrollment size of 161 students, defeated the heavily favored Muncie Central to win the state title. The 1986 David Anspaugh film Hoosiers, starring Gene Hackman, is loosely based on the 1954 tournament.

Since the late 20th century, numerous basketball stars have generated excitement and fan generation in Indiana. One of these players, Larry Bird, became one of the most marketed and popular Indiana athletes in history due to his play for the Indiana State Sycamores from 1976 to 1979, and for his head coaching tenure for the Indiana Pacers from 1997 to 2000. Players such as Reggie Miller and Jalen Rose became popular during Bird's tenure as head coach of the Pacers. In the 21st century, athletes such as Caitlin Clark, Paul George and Tyrese Haliburton have generated similar excitement to a lesser degree. The Caitlin Clark effect has particularly generated excitement around the Indiana Fever of the WNBA.

== High school basketball ==
Through the 2009-2010 NBA season, 152 Hoosier athletes have played professional basketball in the world's top league. Considering the size of the state (population 6.4 million), this makes Indiana high schools by far the most successful at developing NBA players per capita. Today there are 22 Hoosiers in the NBA - more than one for every 150,000 male residents. In 2017, Indiana natives won the NBA and D-league Slam Dunk Contests, NBA and D-league 3-point contests, and won runner-up in the NBA Skills Challenge.

Historically, each of the several hundred small towns of Indiana had its own small school system. Before consolidation of many of these rural school districts in the last half of the twentieth century, Indiana high schools had fewer students than those of most other states; basketball was a natural game for these schools since it only required five starters and a few reserves and even a few great players could make a strong team.

The Franklin Wonder Five, led by Fuzzy Vandivier, was the first team to win the state championship in three consecutive years, from 1920 to 1922. This accomplishment would not be matched for over six decades.

After Milan's Miracle in the 1950s, no school with an enrollment of less than 500 won another boys' State title under the all-comers format. As school consolidation became more common and as more rural residents migrated to cities making large high schools grow even larger, smaller high schools had only a mismatch to look forward to come tournament time, as success concentrated in Indiana's large urban and suburban schools. Starting with the 1997–1998 season, Indiana established a controversial four-class system for its basketball championship, although many other sports remain single-class. The state's move to this new system has, to some extent, diminished the phenomenon and public opinion is widely split on the merits of "class basketball."

Aside from the "Milan Miracle," the story of Crispus Attucks High School ranks as one of the greatest in Indiana high school basketball tradition. In 1955, the year after Attucks had lost in the semistate final (state quarterfinals) to Milan's championship team, Attucks gained fame by winning the Indiana state championship, becoming the first all-black school in the nation to win a state title open to all schools regardless of race. Crispus Attucks repeated as champions in 1956, becoming the first Indiana high school team to complete a season undefeated. The Attucks teams of 1954 through 1956 were led by Oscar Robertson. Milan and Crispus Attucks are memorialized for their accomplishments and tradition at the Indiana State Museum as well as at the Indiana Basketball Hall of Fame in New Castle.

A highlight of the single-class tournament was the 1990 State Championship game, in which the paid attendance was over 40,000 fans. This turnout of fans who witnessed Damon Bailey's Bedford-North Lawrence Stars win the State Championship stands as the largest crowd ever to witness a high school basketball game.

After the 1997 season (when Bloomington North won the final single-class State Championship), the IHSAA controversially did away with the single-class system, ending the run of single-class champions in Indiana. Some argue Hoosier Hysteria was diminished as a result. In 2003, DeKalb High School (1200 students) nearly defeated Pike High School (3000 students). The Indiana tournament is still the most attended in the nation, with final four games for the two larger divisions regularly selling out Gainbridge Fieldhouse (formerly Conseco Fieldhouse and Bankers Life Fieldhouse).

=== High school gymnasiums ===
Indiana also possesses a disproportionate share of the country's largest high school basketball gymnasiums, including nine of the ten largest high school gyms in the country and eighteen of the top twenty. Seventeen venues in Indiana today have a capacity of over 6,000, the largest being the New Castle Fieldhouse, seating 9,325.

== College basketball ==
Hoosier hysteria extends to college basketball. In NCAA Division I basketball, Indiana's colleges and universities have a long history. Big Ten rivals Purdue University and Indiana University and the University of Notre Dame are the most notable, with national and conference championships. Smaller schools such as Indiana State University, Ball State University, Butler University, the University of Evansville, IU Indy, Purdue Fort Wayne, the University of Southern Indiana, and Valparaiso University add to the mix. Vincennes University have a tradition in the junior college ranks, and in Division II St. Joseph's and the University of Indianapolis have added their own successes to Indiana basketball. Wabash College won the Men's Division III NCAA Championship in 1982 and their 1905 24–0 team was considered World Champions; DePauw University and Manchester College were Division III National Finalists.

Teams with national championships
Team	Championship	Years won
Indiana	NCAA Division I Men's Tournament	1940, 1953, 1976, 1981, 1987
Notre Dame	NCAA Division I Women's Tournament	2001, 2018
Purdue	NCAA Division I Women's Tournament	1999
Evansville	NCAA Division II Men's Tournament	1959, 1960, 1964, 1965, 1971
Southern Indiana	NCAA Division II Men's Tournament	1995
Wabash	NCAA Division III Men's Tournament	1982
Trine	NCAA Division III Men's Tournament	2024
DePauw	NCAA Division III Women's Tournament	2007, 2013
Indiana State	NAIA Men's Tournament	1950
Vincennes	NJCAA Division I Men's Tournament	1965, 1970, 1972, 2019
Oakland City	NCCAA Division I Men's Tournament	1999
Bethel	NCCAA Division I Men's Tournament	1992, 1993, 2000, 2007, 2023
Bethel	NCCAA Division I Women's Tournament	2000, 2003, 2004, 2006, 2010, 2011
Indiana Wesleyan	NCCAA Division I Men's Tournament	1995, 2008
Indiana Wesleyan	NCCAA Division I Women's Tournament	2002
Grace	NCCAA Division I Women's Tournament	2024
Huntington	NCCAA Division I Women's Tournament	1984, 1991, 1992

=== Ball State Cardinals ===
The Ball State Cardinals have won several conference championships and earned a number of NCAA Tournament berths over the years, including:

- Seven Mid-American Conference Season Championships
- Seven Mid-American Conference (MAC) Tournament Championships (and subsequent NCAA Tournament appearances)
- Bonzi Wells, a Muncie, Indiana native, was a four-year letterwinner at Ball State, finishing his career as the Mid-American Conference's all-time leading scorer, and leading the NCAA in steals.
- Ball State's highest finish in the NCAA Tournament came in 1990, when they defeated Gary Payton's Oregon State Beavers and Coach Denny Crum's Louisville Cardinals before falling to eventual champion UNLV by 2, 69–67.

=== Butler Bulldogs ===
- Home of the legendary Hinkle Fieldhouse, the largest basketball arena in the world from 1928 to 1950 (including professional arenas). Hinkle hosted the Indiana High School Athletic Association Championships for many years (including Milan's 1954 championship), Butler University also is notable for its men's and women's basketball teams. The Bulldogs advanced to the Sweet 16 of the NCAA Tournament in the 2003 and 2007 seasons.
- In 2006, the Bulldogs won the 2006 Preseason NIT, beating most notably Indiana and Notre Dame to reach the semifinals in New York City. Behind a strong performance from guard A.J. Graves, the Bulldogs defeated Tennessee and Gonzaga at Madison Square Garden.
- In 2010, Butler reached their first Final Four as a #5 seed, beating #12 seeded UTEP in the first round behind a flurry of 3-pointers, edging out a very good #13 seed Murray State (who upset #4 seed Vanderbilt in the first round), and then in the Sweet 16, Butler upset #1 seed Syracuse, and in a thrilling Elite Eight game Butler upset #2 seed Kansas State. The Bulldogs made it to the Finals of the NCAA Tournament after defeating #5 seed Michigan State from the Midwest division. The Bulldogs played against #1 seeded Duke from the South in the finals but lost in a close game, with a potential game-winning shot by Gordon Hayward from just inside half-court rimming out.
- In 2011, Butler returned to the NCAA title game for a second straight year. However, Butler lost 53–41 to Connecticut, shooting a historically low 18.8 percent from the field — the worst in any NCAA title game and the worst in any NCAA tourney game since Harvard against Ohio State in 1946.

=== Evansville Purple Aces ===
- The Evansville Purple Aces have won five national championships in the NCAA College Division (now known as Division II): 1959, 1960, 1964, 1965 (29–0 record), and 1971. This ranks second all-time.
- After joining the NCAA's Division I in 1977, Evansville was a charter member of the Midwest Collegiate Conference, now known as the Horizon League. The Aces won or shared the MCC regular season title in 1982, 1987, 1989, 1992, and 1993. They also won the conference tournament title in 1982, 1992, and 1993.
- The Aces are now a member of the Missouri Valley Conference, and won the 1999 regular season title.
- Legendary Aces coach Arad McCutchan was the first NCAA College Division coach selected to the Naismith Basketball Hall of Fame.

=== Franklin College Grizzlies ===
- Franklin College (total enrollment of around 350 students), known as the "Franklin Wonder Five", declared national college champions in 1922–1923 season, staying undefeated against teams from major universities, including Notre Dame, Illinois, Purdue, and Wisconsin.
- Had a string of 50 consecutive victories over a 2-season span that ended in February 1924, after the team suffered its first defeat by Butler University.
- In 1924, turned down an offer to play the Original Celtics, the top professional team in the nation, for a claim to the "undisputed national championship".
- Two Indiana State Collegiate Championships (1923, 1924).

=== Indiana Hoosiers ===
Indiana's collegiate basketball squad, the Indiana Hoosiers men's basketball team has several championships to their credit:

- Five NCAA National Championships (1940, 1953, 1976, 1981, 1987), placing them in a tie for fifth most all-time
- One NIT Championship (1979) over rival Purdue; and one Runner-up finish (1985) to a UCLA team featuring future member of the Indiana Pacers, Reggie Miller
- Twenty-two Big Ten Championships (including four in a row from 1973 to 1976), currently two behind rival Purdue for the most all-time
- Also, Indiana completed the most recent undefeated season in Division I men's college basketball, going 32–0 in the 1975–76 season under Hall of Fame coach Bob Knight.

The Hoosiers' five NCAA Championships are the fifth in history, tied with Duke, and trailing UCLA (11) Kentucky (8) North Carolina (6) and Connecticut (6). Their eight trips to the Final Four ranks eighth on the all-time list. The Hoosiers have made 41 appearances in the NCAA Division I men's basketball tournament (sixth-most in NCAA history). In those 41 appearances, Indiana has posted 68 victories, the eighth-most in NCAA history.

=== Indiana State Sycamores ===
- Led by the legendary French Lick standout Larry Bird, Indiana State was the runner-up in the 1979 NCAA tournament. They lost to Magic Johnson's Michigan State Spartans. Their final record was 33–1.
- Indiana State, led by All-American Jerry Newsom, was the 1968 NCAA College Division Runner-up. They lost to perennial power Kentucky Wesleyan. Their final record was 23–8.
- Indiana State won the 1950 NAIA Championship.
  - Eight players from the 1950 team played for Head Coach John Longfellow as the United States' Gold Medal Basketball team at the inaugural 1951 Pan-American Games.
- Indiana State was the runner-up in the 1946 and 1948 NAIA championship games. The 1948 team was coached by the legendary John Wooden; it is the only Championship game loss in Coach Wooden's career.
  - In 1947, Wooden's basketball team won the conference title and received an invitation to the NAIA National Tournament in Kansas City. Wooden refused the invitation citing the NAIA's policy banning African American players. A member on the Indiana State Sycamores' team was Clarence Walker, an African-American athlete from East Chicago, Indiana. In 1948 the NAIA changed this policy and Wooden guided his team to the NAIA final, losing to Louisville. That year, Walker became the first African-American to play in ANY post-season intercollegiate basketball tournament.
  - Indiana State finished third in the 1953 NAIA tourney and fourth in the 1949 NAIA tourney
- In 1936, Indiana State was the runner-up in the U.S. Olympics Trials for basketball.
- Two MVC Regular Season Championships and three MVC Tournament Championships.
- Four Indiana Collegiate Conference (ICC) Regular Season Championships.
- Four Indiana Intercollegiate Conference (IIC) Regular Season Championships

=== Notre Dame Fighting Irish ===
- The Notre Dame Men's Basketball team was crowned National Champions of the 1926-1927 basketball season as well as the 1935-1936 basketball season by the Helms Athletic Foundation.
- The Notre Dame Men have a history of upsetting number 1 ranked teams as they have beaten 12 teams ranked No. 1 in the polls. The most notable of these upsets was the 1974 upset of UCLA, who had won their previous 88 contests.
- The Notre Dame Men's Basketball team currently has the 9th most wins in College Basketball History.
- Led by Coach Digger Phelps, the Irish made a trip to the 1978 Final Four where they lost to the Duke Blue Devils.
- The Irish have appeared in the Elite 8 on 7 different occasions. These include 1953, 1954, 1958, 1978 (Final Four),1979, 2015 and 2016.
- Since joining the Big East in 1995, a Notre Dame basketball player has been crowned Big East Player of the year 5 times.
- 10 Notre Dame players have been named consensus All Americans. Three of those players were named to the team in 3 different years. (Only 18 players have been named as consensus All-Americans three times.)
- Notre Dame all-time leading scorer Austin Carr currently holds the record for the most points in an NCAA tournament game, scoring 61 against Ohio in 1971.
- The Irish women won the National Championship in 2001 and 2018.
- The Irish women went to five consecutive Final Fours from 2011 through 2015, finishing as national runner-up in four of those years—2011, 2012, 2014, and 2015. The Irish were also runners-up in 2019.

=== Purdue Boilermakers ===
With their only men's national championship coming in the days before the NCAA Tournament, the Purdue Boilermakers have a basketball history:

- National championship in 1932, led by three-time All-American player and Indiana native John Wooden. (Championship retroactively awarded by the Helms Athletic Foundation, seven years before the NCAA sponsored a basketball championship)
- NCAA Tourney runner-up in 1969 and 2024, semifinalist in 1980
- One NIT Championship (1974); the first for the Big Ten Conference and two Runner-up finishes (1979, 1982) and a third-place finish (1981)
- Twenty-Six (26) Big Ten Championships (including a "Three-Pete" - a play on their mascot - from 1994 to 1996 and from 1934 to 1936.)
  - The most all-time.
  - Currently first all-time in Big Ten Conference victories with 992.

The Boilermaker women have one National Championship (1999), one national runner-up finish (2001 to Notre Dame), seven Big Ten Championships, and have won nine of the 25 women's Big Ten tournaments.

=== Valparaiso Beacons ===
- Nine Summit League regular season championships.
- Eight Summit League tournament championships.
- Memorable run in the 1998 NCAA tournament following The Shot by Bryce Drew.

=== Indianapolis Greyhounds ===
The Indianapolis Greyhounds, representing the University of Indianapolis (UIndy), have a storied basketball history. The Greyhounds were led by UIndy Hall of Famer Angus Nicoson throughout the 1950s and 60s, and Nicoson's teams won 8 Hoosier Conference Championships. More recent success has seen the Hounds ranked No. 1 in the country in Division II basketball in 2014, led by former USI standout, Stan Gouard.

=== St. Joseph's Pumas ===
- The Saint Joseph's Pumas, led by coach Richard Davis, returned to the NCAA Elite Eight for the fourth time in 2010. The Pumas had numerous conference championships and 10 appearances in the NCAA Division II Tournament.

They are members of the Great Lakes Valley Conference, the top Division II conference in the nation.

- Four Great Lakes Valley Conference regular season championships.
- One Great Lakes Valley Conference tournament championships.
- One Indiana Collegiate Conference regular season championship.
- Memorable run in the 2010 NCAA tournament reaching the Elite Eight by make the tournament as an 'at-large' bid and preceding to win the Midwest Regional (3 games) by a total of 5 point. They won the Regional Championship by 1 point in a thrilling triple-overtime game, defeating Quincy University.

=== USI Screaming Eagles ===
- The USI Screaming Eagles, led by current Auburn coach Bruce Pearl, won the 1995 Division II National Championship and were runners-up in 1994 and 2004.

=== Vincennes Trailblazers ===
The Vincennes University men's basketball program is the 4th winningest junior college program in the country, with 1,470 victories. The Trailblazers trail Southeastern Iowa Community College (1,519), Moberly, Mo., (1,505) and Hutchinson, Kan., with 1,490. The Trailblazers' 4 National Titles place them tied with Moberly Area Community College and San Jacinto College - Central, which each have four titles. The Vincennes program began in 1903, however, no teams were formed from 1910 to 1912 and 1931–1950.

- 4 NJCAA National Championships; 1965, 1970, 1972, 2019
  - National Finalist in 1986
  - National Semi-Finalist in 1974, 1983, 1992, 1993
  - National Tournament Top 10 finishes: 1967, 1968, 1969, 1973, 1975, 1977, 1988, 1989, 1995, 1997, 1998 and 2000
- 30 appearances in the NJCAA National Tournament
  - 28 appearances in the NJCAA finals.
- 34 NJCAA Region 12 championships.
- 9 NJCAA District 12 championships.
- 7 Inter-region playoffs

=== Bethel College (Mishawaka) ===
- 3 NAIA National Championships (Men's DII Basketball)
- 29 NCCAA National Championships
- 15 NAIA National Players of the Week

== Professional basketball ==
=== Indiana Pacers ===
The Indiana Pacers are a professional basketball team that plays in the National Basketball Association (NBA). The team is based in the state's capital and largest city, Indianapolis, located in the center of the state. The Indiana Fever of the WNBA, also owned by Melvin & Herb Simon, are the Pacers' sister team and also play in the Gainbridge Fieldhouse.

=== Indiana Fever ===
The Indiana Fever is a professional women's basketball team based in Indianapolis, Indiana, United States. The team competes in the Eastern Conference of the Women's National Basketball Association (WNBA). Their home arena is Gainbridge Fieldhouse located downtown. The Indiana Fever is the sister team of the NBA's Indiana Pacers, sharing ownership and administrative resources. Since drafting Caitlin Clark, they have sold a record breaking amount of tickets for a WNBA team. Lower level tickets for a single game have sold for as much as $4,000.

== National profile ==
=== Big Ten tournament ===
At the conclusion of the regular Big Ten season, a tournament is held to determine the conference winner, who receives the conference's automatic bid to the NCAA tournament. Indianapolis has hosted all but one of the women's tournaments since its inception in 1995, and Gainbridge Fieldhouse has hosted every tournament since 2002, as well as the 2000 edition. The Big Ten Conference men's basketball tournament began a five-year stint at the then Conseco Fieldhouse in 2008.

=== Final Four ===
Indianapolis, headquarters of the National Collegiate Athletic Association and often referred to as the "Amateur Sports Capital of the World" has hosted a number of collegiate basketball events. Aside from the multitude of regional games held during the NCAA tournament, Indianapolis is tied with New York City for having hosted the second most NCAA Men's Division I Basketball Championships (1980, 1991, 1997, 2000, 2006, 2010, 2015, and 2021). The city will host the men's Final Four next in 2026 and 2029. Previous events were held in the Market Square Arena or the RCA Dome, but given the new stadium built for the Indianapolis Colts, Lucas Oil Stadium began hosting Final Four events in 2010. When the NCAA Headquarters relocated to Indianapolis, it was stated that Indianapolis would then host the men's Final Four once every five years.

=== World championships ===
In 2002, Indianapolis hosted the FIBA World Championship (now known as the FIBA Basketball World Cup), an event that takes place on even years opposite the Olympic Games. Since inaugural event in 1950, Indianapolis is the only city in the United States to have hosted the event.

== Firsts ==
- In a game on December 9, 1916, Purdue became the first to use glass backboard on its hoops. Afterwards Coach Mefford, of the Rose Poly team, claimed that the glass backboards in the Purdue gym handicapped his team.
- Patent no. 1,757,350 granted on May 6, 1930, to William Wallace of Lafayette, Indiana for a "Basket-Ball-Basket Suspension" is an improvement on earlier removable goals. In this instance, the goal merely folds up against the ceiling. This innovation provides the flexibility seen in gymnasiums today where basketball goals are simply raised and lowered by the flip of a switch.

== See also ==
- Caitlin Clark effect
- Hoosiers, a 1986 film about a small-town Indiana high school basketball team that wins the state championship. Loosely based on the 1954 Milan state championship team.
- Blue Chips - a 1994 basketball movie telling the tale of a by-the-books coach who turns to "friends of the program" to secure the talents of incoming freshman players; it contains roles by NBA stars Shaquille O'Neal, Anfernee Hardaway, and cameos by Larry Bird, Rick Pitino, George Raveling, Jim Boeheim, Jerry Tarkanian, Rick Fox and current Purdue Head Coach Matt Painter. The game segments were filmed in Frankfort, Indiana. Numerous other segments of the film were shot around the state of Indiana.
- Indiana High School Boys Basketball Champions
- Indiana "Mr. Basketball" award
- Illinois high school boys basketball championship, known as "America's Original March Madness"; the neighboring state of Illinois has a similar relationship and history with basketball.
- Sweet Sixteen, the boys' and girls' high school championship tournaments of another neighboring state, Kentucky, which also has a similar relationship with basketball. Most notably, Kentucky's Sweet Sixteen still uses the single-class model that Indiana abandoned in the late 1990s.
