= Dauntless: The Battle of Midway =

- Directed by: Mike Phillips
- Written by: Adam Klein (screenplay); Adam Klein, Mike Phillips (story)
- Produced by: Mike Phillips (as Michael Phillips Jr.)
- Starring: C. Thomas Howell; Judd Nelson; Jade Willey; John Enick
- Cinematography: Jason Newfield
- Edited by: Jason Newfield; Mike Phillips
- Music by: Ryan Franks; Scott Nickoley
- Production companies: Bayou Pictures; Gypsy Lane Films
- Distributed by: VMI Worldwide
- Release date: September 6, 2019 (Cleveland)
- Running time: 98 minutes
- Country: United States
- Language: English

Dauntless: The Battle of Midway (a.k.a. Adrift as the working title) is a 2019 action film based on a true story of United States Navy aviators at the Battle of Midway. The theme of the film combines war and aviation film genres. The film was written, directed and produced by Mike Phillips. The screenplay of Dauntless: The Battle of Midway was written by Adam Klein and based on an original story by Phillips.

== Plot ==
By June 1942, the Imperial Japanese Navy has met with spectacular success at the attack on Pearl Harbor and has swept across the Pacific, conquering vast areas. In an effort to change the course of the war, a United States Navy carrier group is positioned off the coast of Midway Atoll, the home of Naval Air Facility Midway Island. The task force plans on springing a trap on the enemy, and the ensuing Battle of Midway turns out to be a pivotal turning point of the Pacific war.

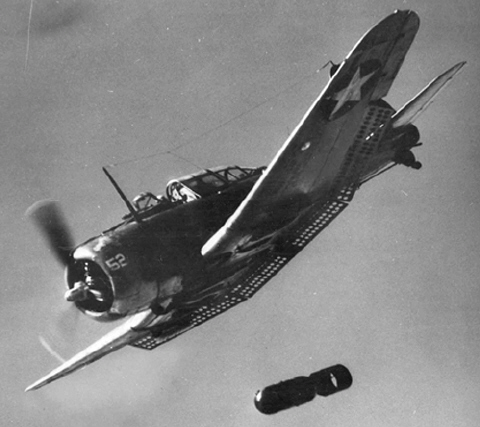
A U.S. Navy SBD releasing a bomb.

During the battle, a two-man Douglas SBD Dauntless dive bomber crew consisting of pilot Ensign Norman Vandivier and S1 (Radioman) Lee Keaney from the USS Enterprise aircraft carrier are in the first wave of dive bombers attacking and sinking a Japanese carrier. In their attempt to escape, their aircraft is struck by enemy fire from a Japanese surface ship. Losing fuel and forced to ditch, the crew look toward their comrades for rescue.

The "misfit" crew of a Consolidated PBY Catalina led by Lieutenant Bennett are sent to search for survivors of the battle, including the downed Dauntless crew of Vandivier and Keaney. While the human drama on the ocean continues, Rear Admiral R.A. Spruance confers with his top officers in planning for the second day of the battle, knowing that his aircraft must again attack a superior foe.

At the conclusion of the battle, the attacking US Navy aircraft are running low on fuel and desperate to find their carriers in the dark. Despite the opposition from his operations officer, Captain Browning, Spruance orders all lights on the carrier Task Force 16 to be turned on, helping some of his aircraft to limp home.

Amid the vast Pacific with days passing and the chance of rescue fading, the two men in the ocean are forced to face their own mortality. At the end of the second day of the battle, Keaney finally succumbs to his injuries and hypothermia; Vandivier reluctantly pushes his crewmate away but ultimately Vandivier also succumbs to exposure.

When the Catalina flying boat takes up station again, Lieutenant Bennett and his crew locate a survivor in the water. After one of the crew swims out to bring the obviously exhausted Ensign Ramsay to the Catalina, Bennett is, however, distraught that he was unable to rescue his friend, Vandivier.

== Cast ==
- Judd Nelson as Rear Admiral Raymond A. Spruance
- C. Thomas Howell as Captain Miles Browning
- Byrne Offutt as Captain George D. Murray
- Drew Garrett as Lieutenant Commander Wade McClusky Jr.
- Adam Peltier as Lieutenant Bennett
- Jade Willey as Ensign Norman Francis Vandivier
- Chris Roark as Ensign Thomas Wesley Ramsay
- John Enick as S1 Lee Keaney
- James Austin Kerr as Banks
- Will Ropp as Mansfield
- Mendel Fogelman as Doc
- Nate Slaughter as Steward
- Paul Kennedy Jr. as Jackson
- Jack Malykin as Gallaher
- Miles Tagtmeyer as Allison
- Daniel Mckinley Rhodes as Reynolds
- Demetris Hartman as Ware
- Aidan Bristow as Pags
- Christopher Lee Page as Nussbaum
- Louie Chapman as Smokey
- Jerry Buteyn as BMC Bob Ruch

== Production ==
Dauntless: The Battle of Midway was written primarily by Mike Phillips with the help of Adam Klein who created the screenplay. Phillips had a personal interest in the story of Midway due to a close connection with the family of Ensign Ramsay who fought in the battle. For 15 years, he had worked to adapt the real-life story into a film project. Authenticity was ensured by the use of original after-action reports as the screenplay was developed. The reports were written by Lt. Richard Halsey Best, Lt. W. Earl Gallaher, Captain George Murray and Admiral Raymond A. Spruance.

A brief contemporary account of the Attack on Pearl Harbor was shown in its original black-and-white newsreel-like footage, but the remainder of the film was in color. Due to budget restrictions, heavy reliance on CGI was used for all flight sequences. An effort was evident to accurately depict period military colors, markings with replica military hardware and armament.

Two full-scale models were built, with the main cockpit section of the SBD Dauntless recreated and the interior cockpit and radio station of the PBY Catalina also built as a mock-up. During location shooting, the ocean scenes were filmed outside Los Angeles as well as in a pool for closeups. Cinematographer Jason Newfield used a variety of ingenious camera platforms mounted on life preservers, dinghy and a yacht to achieve a realistic account of the stranded and drifting Navy crew. Three views of the crewmen in the water were from directly overhead using a drone, at water level and underwater.

== Reception ==
=== Release ===
Dauntless: The Battle of Midway was released direct to video in October 2019. A DVD and Blu-ray edition was offered that included additional alternate endings, and two featurettes that documented the making of the film. Worldwide release of the film followed, including editions for Germany, Austria and Switzerland. It sold well on home video, bringing in an estimated $2,767,967 in DVD and Blu-ray sales.

=== Reviews ===
David Duprey of That Moment rated the film at 2 1/2 out of 5 stars, criticizing its script as being "simply too generic and weightless to deliver the thump we want" while praising the movie's acting, and overall stating that "It’s clear that the team involved with Dauntless weren’t in this half-hearted, doing what they could to make a small but effective war movie. On many levels they succeed, but when it’s over, there isn’t much to make this any more significant than so many others like it."

Matt Willis of Naval Air History praised Dauntless for its acting and action scenes, also noting that "The scenario asks a lot of both script and actors, and if they sometimes struggle under the weight of what is required of them, the sense of waste and perhaps unnecessary sacrifice is well portrayed."
