= Byrne Offutt =

American actor

Byrne Offutt is an American actor who has appeared in movies, television, commercials, animation, video games, radio, and the stage.

== Career ==
In 1997, three weeks after moving to Los Angeles, Offutt booked the first part he auditioned for playing the boyfriend of Nicole Eggert on Charles in Charge.

Other television appearances include recurring roles on Kickin' It, The Young and the Restless and Significant Others as well as appearances on Law & Order: Los Angeles, Justified, The Secret Life of the American Teenager, Frasier, Pushing Daisies, Lie to Me, Criminal Minds, Two and a Half Men, E-Ring and NCIS. He has also done voices on animated series such as W.I.T.C.H. and Futurama. On the theatre circuit, he has played Pink in Pink Floyd's The Wall at The Actors' Gang Theatre.

He voices the character of Uriah on the Disney cartoon W.I.T.C.H. as well as appearing in 44 episodes of Futurama. He plays several characters in the video games Hitman: Blood Money and Kameo: Elements of Power and, most recently, played the character of Tom Chalmers in Medal of Honor Vanguard and in Medal of Honor: Airborne.

== Filmography ==
=== Film ===
Year	Title	Role	Notes
2001	The Comedy Team of Pete & James	Taft Oakley	
2002	Wrong Way to Sundance	Patrick	
2005	Murder on the Yellow Brick Road	Martin Russo	
2007	Trust Me	Melvin Greenblatt	
2008	Superhero Movie	Reporter Ed	
2019	Dauntless: The Battle of Midway	Captain Murray	

=== Television ===
Year	Title	Role	Notes
1990	Charles in Charge	Cliff Randall	Episode: "Advice and Contempt"
1990	Quantum Leap	Leon	Episode: "Maybe Baby"
1998	Sunset Beach	Groom	Episode #1.372
1998	Toonsylvania	Utility Player	Episode: "Igor's Replacement/The Deadman Bunc"
1998	Oh Yeah! Cartoons	Voice	1 episode
1999	Rocket Power	Dog Walker	Episode: "Otto 3000/Night Prowlers"
1999	Family Law	Co Star	Episode: "The Nanny"
2001	Frasier	Joe, Delivery Man	Episode: "The Return of Martin Crane"
2002	Malcolm in the Middle	Ben	Episode: "Jury Duty"
2002	Even Stevens	Mr. Durbin	Episode: "Short Story"
2002	Mission Hill	Utility Player	2 episodes
2004	Two and a Half Men	Paul	Episode: "Can You Feel My Finger"
2004	Significant Others	Dave	3 episodes
2005	Center of the Universe	Terrified Guy	Episode: "Marathon Woman"
2005	NCIS	Judd Kearns	Episode: "Silver War"
2005	E-Ring	Rick Weston	Episode: "Christmas Story"
2005–2006	W.I.T.C.H.	Various roles	24 episodes
2007	Criminal Minds	Jeff	Episode: "Fear and Loathing"
2007	The Matt Baetz Project	Byrne	Television film
2008	Eli Stone	Rudy Conlon	Episode: "The Humanitarian"
2009	Polterguys	Byrne	Television film
2009	Lie to Me	DHS Deputy	Episode: "Moral Waiver"
2009	The Secret Life of the American Teenager	Jim	Episode: "Unforgiven"
2009	Pushing Daisies	Mr. Cray	Episode: "Water & Power"
2009	The Young and the Restless	Dean Hunt	2 episodes
2010	Justified	Doctor	Episode: "The Lord of War and Thunder"
2011	Law & Order: LA	Joe Rivlin	Episode: "Silver Lake"
2011–2013	Kickin' It	Milton's Dad	3 episodes
2012	Castle	Manager	Episode: "Til Death Do Us Part"
2020	Stumptown	Bill Stevens	Episode: "The Past and the Furious"
2020	Solve	Harold	Episode: "Static"
