= Liza del Mundo =

American actress

- Born: March 8, 1975 (age 51); San Diego, California, U.S.
- Occupation: Actress
- Years active: 1992–present
- Children: Vivian Vencer (daughter)

Liza del Mundo (born March 8, 1975) is an American voice actress. She is best known for her roles as Hay Lin in the animated adaptation of W.I.T.C.H and as Polaris in the TV series Wolverine and the X-Men.

== Early life ==
Del Mundo was raised in the Rancho Penasquitos neighborhood of San Diego, California.

In 1993, Del Mundo graduated from Mount Carmel High School, where she wrote for the school newspaper and participated in student government. She went on to study communications at Cal State Northridge.

== Career ==
Del Mundo worked for the Disney Channel as a voice host, notably in Toon Town Kids, and has been featured in several television commercials. Among her notable voices are Hay Lin in W.I.T.C.H, Natasha in Tutenstein, Wendy in Danger Rangers, Polaris in Wolverine and the X-Men, and Laura, Andy's mother, on Maya & Miguel. She also portrayed the title role Imelda Marcos in Imelda: A New Musical.

== Personal life ==
Del Mundo's daughter, Vivian Vencer, is also a voice actress.
