= Caitlin Clark effect =

Term in women's basketball

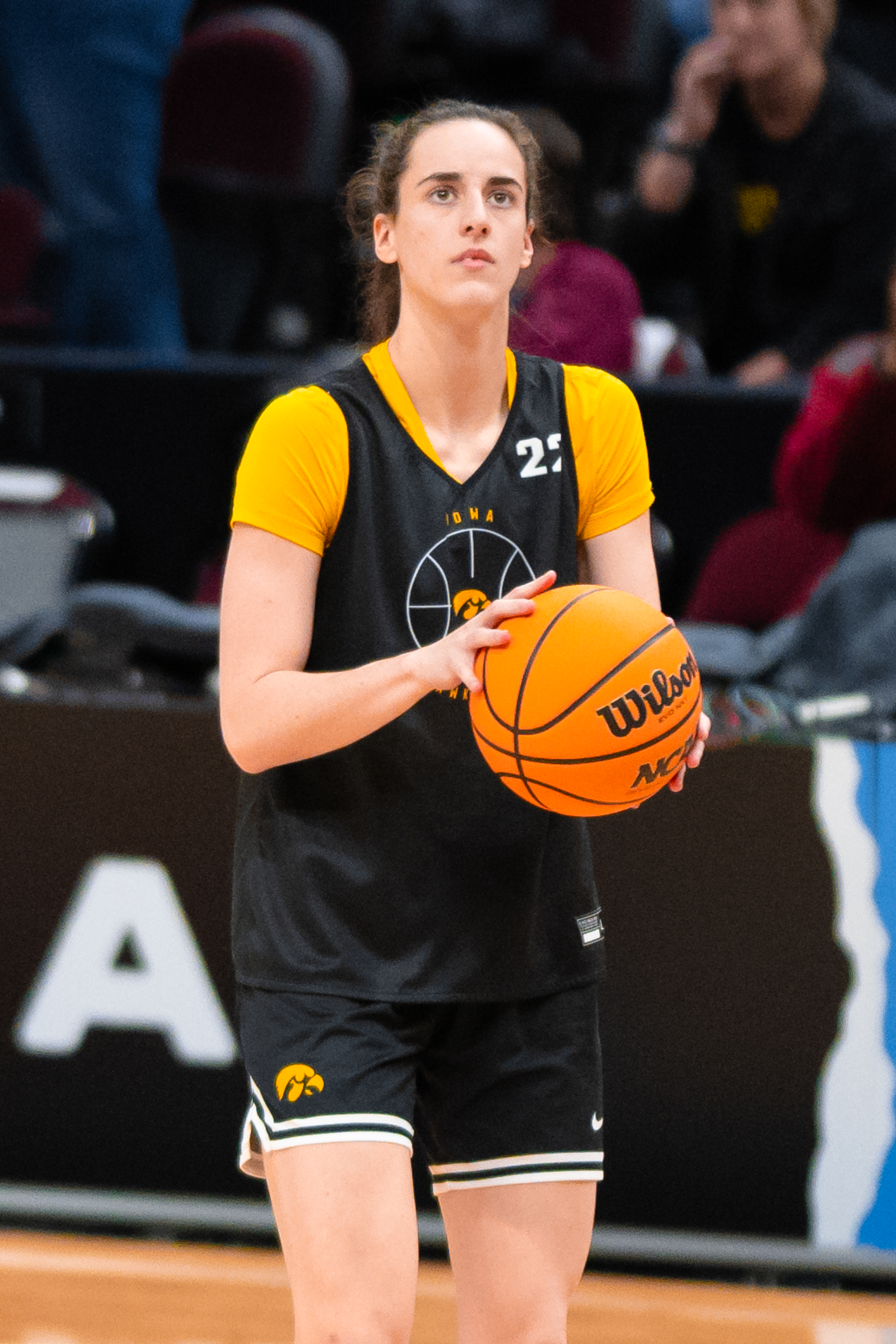
Caitlin Clark with the Iowa Hawkeyes in 2024

The Caitlin Clark effect is the increase in popularity of women's basketball attributed to American basketball player Caitlin Clark. During Clark's collegiate career with the Iowa Hawkeyes, she drew unprecedented public interest to the sport. In 2023 and 2024, her final two seasons at Iowa, her games set attendance and television viewership records. After Clark was drafted by the Indiana Fever of the Women's National Basketball Association (WNBA), analysts credited her for increasing WNBA attendance and viewership and reigniting the "Hoosier hysteria" phenomenon.

== Background ==
Clark drew national attention as a junior for Iowa during the 2023 NCAA tournament, where she set tournament records in points and three-pointers while helping her team achieve a runner-up finish. USA Today reporter Lindsay Schnell noted that Clark became a "household name" due to her play during the tournament. The 2023 national championship game set the women's college basketball viewership record with 9.9 million viewers. The Athletic writer Richard Deitsch wrote that Clark drew casual viewers to the title game, in part due to her long-range three-point shooting. Entering Clark's senior season in 2023–24, local media attributed increases in Iowa ticket sales to the "Caitlin Clark effect". During the 2023–24 season, the term was used by many publications, including BBC News, The Washington Post and USA Today, to describe Clark's general impact on the popularity of women's basketball, as measured by ticket prices, attendance and television viewership, among other factors.

== Television viewership ==
Clark drove historic levels of television viewership during her final two seasons at Iowa. At the conclusion of her college career, she was proclaimed the "GOAT of TV Ratings" by The Wall Street Journal, which wrote that her impact on television viewership exceeded any other modern athlete. The 2023 national championship game, which featured Clark, was the most-watched women's college basketball game in history, averaging 9.9 million viewers. On March 3, 2024, her game against Ohio State, in which she surpassed Pete Maravich to become the NCAA Division I all-time leading scorer, averaged 3.39 million viewers. It was the most-watched women's regular season college basketball game on Fox and on any network since 1999. Clark's first three games in the 2024 NCAA tournament each became the most-viewed women's college basketball games prior to the Final Four. Her Elite Eight game against LSU (12.3 million), which was a rematch of the 2023 national title game, and her Final Four contest against UConn (14.2 million) each broke the women's college basketball viewership record. The 2024 national championship game, where Clark played against South Carolina, again set the women's college basketball viewership record with 18.9 million viewers and was the most-watched basketball game since 2019. It was the first NCAA women's basketball title game to outdraw the men's title game.

Clark continued to set viewership records upon entering the WNBA. The 2024 WNBA draft, where the Indiana Fever selected Clark with the first overall pick, averaged 2.45 million viewers, the most in WNBA draft history. It was also the most-watched WNBA telecast since 2000. Clark's regular season debut against the Connecticut Sun on May 14, 2024, was the most-watched WNBA game since 2002 and the most-watched ever on ESPN2 or any cable network. On May 18, her game against the New York Liberty set the league's ABC viewership record with 1.71 million viewers. In the following week, Clark's games set WNBA viewership marks on ESPN, Ion and NBA TV.

== Game attendance ==
Clark has driven increases in home and away attendance for her games. Entering her senior season, her Iowa team sold out all of its home games for the first time, after previously selling out only three regular season games in program history. On October 15, 2023, Iowa held a preseason exhibition game against DePaul at Kinnick Stadium, which set the women's basketball single-game attendance record at 55,646. Iowa sold out or set an attendance record in all but two regular season games, both at the Gulf Coast Showcase during the Thanksgiving weekend. Her November 9 game against Virginia Tech, held at a neutral site in Charlotte, North Carolina, had the highest attendance (15,196) for any women's college basketball game in state history. Teams that reported attendance records while hosting Iowa included Wisconsin (14,252), Ohio State (18,660), and Nebraska (15,042), and Northwestern recorded its first sellout against the Hawkeyes. Iowa set the Big Ten single-season average attendance record (14,998), surpassing its own mark from the previous season (11,143). Her regular season finale against Ohio State, in which she passed Maravich as the NCAA Division I all-time leading scorer, was the most expensive women's college basketball game of all time, with an average ticket price of $408. The 2024 Big Ten tournament, where Clark led her team to the title, sold out for the first time in event history.

Before Clark's first season with the Indiana Fever, a study led by Michael J. Hicks of Ball State University estimated that Clark would bring over $2.4 million to central Indiana and draw 26,000 more fans to Fever games. During her first month in the WNBA, the Los Angeles Sparks (19,103), New York Liberty (17,735) and Seattle Storm (18,343) each set attendance records while hosting her Fever team. The Sparks, Las Vegas Aces, Washington Mystics and Atlanta Dream moved home games against the Fever to larger arenas to accommodate public interest in Clark. Her game against the Mystics on June 7, 2024, which was moved to the Capital One Arena, had an attendance of 20,333, the most for a WNBA game since the 2007 WNBA Finals and the fifth-most for a regular season game. The two teams met again at Capital One Arena on September 19, 2024, for the regular-season finale and drew the WNBA's highest-ever attendance for a regular-season game, at 20,711. For the 2024 WNBA season, the Fever set a new single-season record with 340,715 fans for total home attendance for a WNBA team.

== Economic impact ==
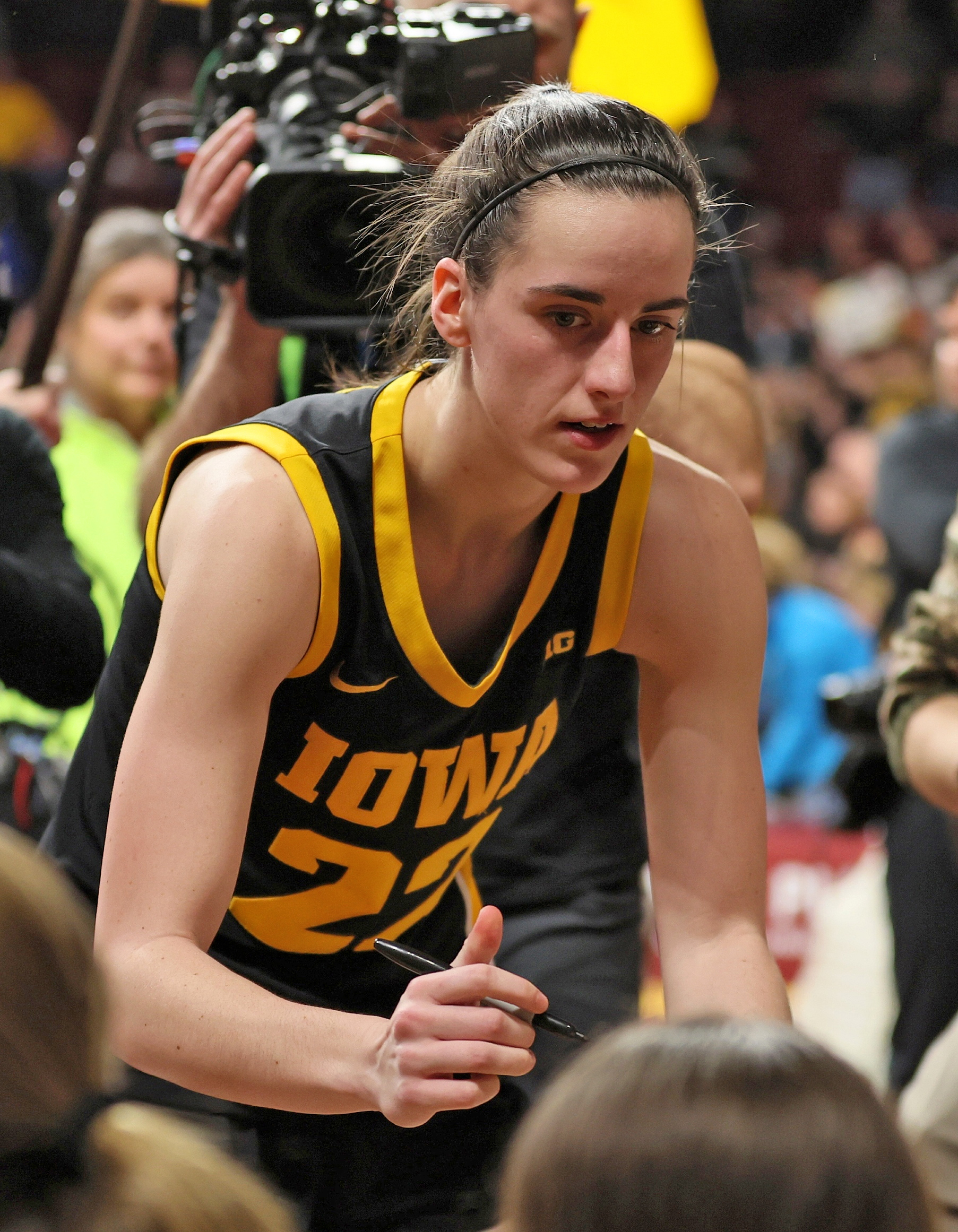
Clark signing autographs after a game in 2024

The Common Sense Institute Iowa, an economic research organization, estimated in March 2024 that the Caitlin Clark effect increased Iowa's gross domestic product by between $14.4 million and $52.3 million, while generating about $82.5 million in consumer spending. On the same day of the 2024 WNBA draft, Clark's Indiana Fever jersey sold out in less than an hour. During the year's first semester, Clark's jersey was not only the best-selling of the WNBA, but the second of all North American basketball after Stephen Curry of the NBA.

After the 2024 season, Ryan Brewer, a finance professor at Indiana University Columbus and a specialist on valuation, determined that Clark's presence was responsible for more than 25% of the WNBA's revenue in that season, including attendance, TV, and merchandise sales. He also determined that Clark's overall economic impact on the city of Indianapolis was $36.5 million, dwarfing Hicks' preseason estimate of $2.4 million. Brewer told The Indianapolis Star, "The numbers are so staggering. They don't even seem real."

Shortly after the start of the 2025 season, Brewer told NBC News that Clark's presence had increased the overall value of the WNBA to a minimum of $875 million, with the potential for a value of over $1 billion. In June 2025, Travonne Edwards, a JD Finish Line strategist, reported that the Indiana Fever team store was audited due to the significant increase in sales in 2024. Later that same month, Forbes released a list of the most valuable WNBA franchises wherein the Fever was named second (behind the New York Liberty, the 2024 champions) with an estimated value of $370 million which was credited in part to Clark's popularity. Forbes also reported that the Fever led the WNBA in revenue with an estimated $32 million in 2024 while also "becoming the most followed women’s basketball team online."

== Commentary ==
The claimed role of Clark's identity in the Caitlin Clark effect has drawn scrutiny. The Athletic columnist Jim Trotter alleged that Clark appeals to a wider audience by being white, straight and from the United States heartland, in contrast to many WNBA players. The Atlantic writer Jemele Hill, USA Today reporter Lindsay Schnell and WNBA star A'ja Wilson have also highlighted the perceived racial component of her popularity and the inequity in media coverage of black female athletes. USA Today columnist Christine Brennan wrote that Clark's popularity was not media-driven, but rather "grew organically from the heartland to the coasts" due to her style of play.

Clark's ability to attract public interest and connect with fans has been likened to pop singer Taylor Swift. The Caitlin Clark effect has also been compared to the rivalry between Larry Bird and Magic Johnson, which helped popularize men's basketball in the 1980s. In June 2025, Two Circles, a sports marketing agency, stated that Clark, “was the most-talked-about female athlete from any sport on social media [in 2024], and posts mentioning her had the highest engagement."
