= W.I.T.C.H. (TV series) =

French-American animated television series

- Also known as: Dimension W.I.T.C.H. (season 2, France)
- Genre: Action comedy-drama; Fantasy; Magical girl; Superhero
- Based on: W.I.T.C.H. by: Elisabetta Gnone; Alessandro Barbucci; Barbara Canepa
- Developed by: Claire Paoletti (adapted by); Andrew Nicholls and Darrell Vickers (season 1); Greg Weisman (season 2)
- Directed by: Marc Gordon (season 1); Norman J. LeBlanc (season 2)
- Voices of: Kelly Stables; Candi Milo; Kali Troy; Christel Khalil; Liza del Mundo
- Theme music composer: International: Alain Garcia; Noam Kaniel; David Vadant (season 2); United States: Adam Watts; Andy Dodd
- Opening theme: International: "W.I.T.C.H. Theme Song" (Note: This is the title used for the liner notes and back cover of the soundtrack album CD. Digital distribution releases rename the song to "W.I.T.C.H (Theme)".) by Sabrina; United States: "We Are W.I.T.C.H." by Marion Raven (Note: The demo version used before episode 14 is performed by Chelsea Somma. See the opening and soundtrack sections for details.)
- Composers: Alain Garcia; Noam Kaniel
- Countries of origin: France; United States
- Original language: English (Note: All of the writers for the series, including all three supervisory producers (showrunners), are known to have been based in the United States and have written for English-language projects.)
- No. of seasons: 2
- No. of episodes: 52 (list of episodes)

Production
- Executive producers: Olivier Dumont; Stéphanie Kirchmeyer (season 2); Jacqueline Tordjman
- Producers: Bruno Bianchi; Dana Booton (season 1); Nancy Neufeld Callaway (season 1)
- Running time: 22 minutes
- Production companies: SIP Animation; The Walt Disney Company

Original release
- Network: France 3 (Toowam) (Note: The block was named France Truc until July 2006.) (France); ABC (ABC Kids) (U.S.)
- Release: December 18, 2004 – December 23, 2006

W.I.T.C.H. is a French-American animated television series based on the Italian comic book series of the same name published by Disney Publishing Worldwide. It was produced by SIP Animation and The Walt Disney Company, with the participation of France Télévisions and Jetix's European division. The show follows five girls – Will, Irma, Taranee, Cornelia, and Hay Lin – who have respective magical powers over the classical elements quintessence, water, fire, earth and air, which they use to fulfill their duties as Guardians of the Veil. It takes place in the city of Heatherfield and various mythical worlds, primarily Meridian.

W.I.T.C.H. premiered in the U.S. on December 18, 2004, and concluded on December 23, 2006, where it aired on ABC's ABC Kids block, with reruns on ABC Family and Toon Disney's Jetix blocks, and Disney Channel. The series premiered in France on February 3, 2005, on France 3's Toowam block, with reruns on Jetix, Disney Channel, and Disney XD. Internationally, it was mainly broadcast on Disney-owned channels, especially on Jetix.

== Plot ==
The second generation of legendary Guardians of the Veil – Wilhelmina "Will" Vandom, Irma Lair, Taranee Cook, Cornelia Hale and Hay Lin – must save planet Meridian from the evil Prince Phobos and Lord Cedric, who are searching for the tyrannical prince's younger sister, the long-lost princess of Meridian and true heir to the throne. They later find her to be Irma and Taranee's classmate and Cornelia's best friend, Elyon Brown, and the Guardians then set about saving her from Prince Phobos' cunning.

When Meridian is finally freed from evil and the true heir takes the throne, a mysterious evil sorceress named Nerissa takes Phobos' top henchmen and reforms them as the Knights of Vengeance to act as a distraction to the Guardians. Once the Guardians learn more about the evil sorceress and her evil plan of reuniting the other four former Guardians - Cassidy, Halinor, Yan Lin, and Kadma - they are able to defeat the Knights of Vengeance, only to battle with more powerful Knights of Destruction made from Nerissa's dark vengeful feelings of hatred and anger, fear and misery: Shagon, Khor, Tridart and Ember.

The Guardians' chief ally is Hay Lin's paternal grandmother Yan Lin, the former Guardian of Air. She taught the girls about their magical abilities and destiny as the second generation of Guardians of the Veil. They are also helped by Caleb, a heroic soldier from Meridian, leader of the rebellion against Phobos, and Blunk, a frog-like goblin creature (known as a Passling) who takes things from the human world to Meridian and vice versa, humorously mistaking everyday objects for other things or items of value. Matt, Will's boyfriend, accidentally learns about Meridian and when he sees the troubles there going on, he learns how to become a warrior to help them. They are also helped by the Oracle, leader of the Universe in Kandrakar, who was the one who chose the five girls.

=== Guardian Abilities/Magic ===
Each Guardian's powers are further developed and magnified greatly by the mystical world of Kandrakar, transmitted to the pink Heart of Kandrakar via the Aurameres (the physical representations and source of the Guardians' powers). The Keeper of the Aurameres is Luba, a cat-like being.

When the Guardians transform, they change form (their bodies mature to its physical prime), outfits and grow wings, which help them fly. Since the Veil was taken down, the Guardians cross worlds by folding, with the help of the Heart of Kandrakar. Elyon and Blunk can fold as well.

In order to travel to another place in the same world, each Guardian can teletransport. Teletransporting is a difficult ability to learn and one can materialize into another solid object if not careful enough. If a Guardian teletransports while not connected to an Auramere or a Heart, then they will drain their life force.

Each Guardian can use their elemental powers and also manifest abilities based on their element or specific to them, such as Hay Lin's enhanced hearing as the Air Guardian. She also is an empath, able to determine someone’s future stressful emotions via dreams.

A Guardian can become a Quinto-Guardian, obtaining powers over all five elements. A Quinto-Guardian can gain the power to create solid ice out of thin air as with liquid water. The only known Quinto-Guardians are Cornelia (temporarily via the merged Aurameres) and Nerissa (by using her Seal).

The Guardians can also become their element while increasing all of their elemental abilities to their zenith of strength. This is risky and rather dangerous because it costs them their humanity, and they could be easily controlled.

==== Astral Drops and Altermeres ====
Using the Heart of Kandrakar, a Guardian can create an Astral Drop, a duplicate of herself, when the words "Spord Lartsa" (Astral Drops spelled backwards) are said. The Astral Drops are doppelgangers, summoned when the Guardians have to go on a mission and need doubles so their absence is not felt. Although a Drop is a perfect physical copy of a person, they possess none of their memories, and have no personality of their own.

An Altermere is an Astral Drop brought to life through the power of Quintessence. Unlike Astral Drops, they are independent beings with feelings, emotions and memories. The concept of Altermeres is introduced in "H is for Hunted" when Will creates an Astral Drop to do her chores (laundry). Nerissa soon creates trouble by making the Astral Drop an Altermere. In "R is for Relentless", Nerissa tries to corrupt Yan Lin to her side, but is unable to do so. Nerissa traps Yan in the Seal of Nerissa and creates an Altermere double who does not realize she is not the real Yan until Nerissa tells her. In "Z is for Zenith", Yan introduces her Altermere to her son and daughter-in-law, passing her off as her long-lost twin sister Mira.

== Characters ==
=== Main ===
All five main characters are thirteen years old.

==== W.I.T.C.H. ====
The main characters of W.I.T.C.H are girls who can transform into fairy warriors. Clockwise from center: Will, Hay Lin, Irma, Cornelia, and Taranee.

- Will Vandom (voiced by Kelly Stables) is the 13-year-old leader of the Guardians of the Veil and possesses the Heart of Kandrakar, later also the Guardian of Quintessence. Will moves to Heatherfield with her mother at the beginning of the series. Originally, Will's powers primarily revolve around activating the transformation into Guardian form and sealing portals. In the second season, Will fully gains her own elemental ability of quintessence, the fifth element, which grants her electrokinetic and life-granting abilities. In addition, Will is able to communicate with electrical appliances. Her only love interest and boyfriend throughout the series is Matt Olsen.
- Irma Lair (voiced by Candi Milo) is the 13-year-old Guardian of Water whose ability allows her to control water, and in the second season, the power of mind control. Irma acts as the series' comic relief, providing witty dialogue and remarks, which is often a source of irritation for Cornelia. Irma is appointed as the station manager of Sheffield Institute's radio station, she titles her radio segment Lair on the Air. Unlike the other Guardians, Irma does not have a boyfriend despite her affection for Andrew Hornby and the unrequited attention from Martin Tubbs.
- Taranee Cook (voiced by Kali Troy) is the 13-year-old Guardian of Fire, able to create and manipulate fire, and in the second season, she has the ability to telepathically communicate with the other Guardians. Taranee is dedicated to her schoolwork, and often uses her intellect to defeat enemies. Her boyfriend is Nigel Ashcroft, whose social circle initially causes mistrust by Taranee's parents.
- Cornelia Hale (voiced by Christel Khalil) is the 13-year-old Guardian of Earth granting her the ability to control earth and plants and in the second season, she gains the power of telekinesis. Cornelia is vain and haughty, and is often a foil to Will. But she begins to warm up to her eventually, throughout the series. She is best friends with Elyon Brown, later revealed to be the missing Princess of Meridian. Cornelia becomes romantically involved with Caleb. His duties in Meridian later cause a rift in their relationship.
- Hay Lin (voiced by Liza del Mundo) is the 13-year-old Guardian of Air which enables her to control air, and also become invisible in the second season. Her paternal grandmother, Yan Lin, was the previous Guardian of Air and introduced the new Guardians to their roles. Hay Lin is of Chinese descent and her parents own the Silver Dragon, a Chinese restaurant, where Hay Lin works part-time. Hay Lin enjoys art and is a free spirit. Despite her original distaste for dating, Hay Lin becomes infatuated with Eric Lyndon who eventually becomes her boyfriend.

==== Allies ====
- Caleb (voiced by Greg Cipes) is a 15-year-old human teenager, who started Meridian's resistance movement. Caleb is usually accompanied by Blunk. Caleb is brave and reckless, as well a strong and quick-thinking leader and a good fighter. He tends to be a little arrogant and bad-tempered, with a sarcastic streak. Although he puts on a tough and uncaring attitude, Caleb is a loyal friend who sticks to his beliefs no matter what. Even though he is the only one of the main characters who has no special powers or abilities he is more than able to hold his ground against more powerful opponents with his experience, quick thinking and hand-to-hand combat skills.
- Blunk (voiced by Steve Blum) is a small and smelly creature who lives on Meridian. He is a Passling, a short frog/troll-like creature who travels through the dimensions to find and steal goods to sell. Blunk went to Earth with Caleb and the Guardians and quickly made a home there: the Silver Dragon's dumpster. Blunk, being able to sniff out portals, frequently travels to and from Earth to find goods.
- Elyon Brown (voiced by Serena Berman) is a 12-year-old princess (and later queen) of Meridian. Elyon was born in Meridian, lone daughter to the Queen Weira and Consort Zayden and heir to the throne. After her parents disappeared when she was a baby, a Meridianite named Galgheita took Elyon to Earth to evade Phobos, her evil older brother. Elyon was raised there as a normal girl by the Browns, Meridianites whom Elyon believed to be her parents. Cedric eventually tells her about her identity and turns her against the Guardians, convincing her to go to Meridian, where he teaches her to wield and use her powers. After Phobos and Cedric betrayed Elyon on her coronation day, she finally realizes that Phobos and Cedric are heartless tyrants lusting after her powers and helps W.I.T.C.H. defeat them. Elyon then stays in Meridian, along with her surrogate parents, and assumes her rightful place as the Heart of Meridian.
- Yan Lin (voiced by Lauren Tom) is the former Guardian of Air. She is Hay Lin's paternal grandmother and a helpful advisor to the new Guardians. In the second season, she is captured by her former best friend and fellow Guardian, Nerissa, and cloned via an Altermere, with the clone being corrupted and forced to work for Nerissa.
- Matt Olsen (voiced by Jason Marsden) is Will's classmate and starts off as her crush, later becoming her boyfriend. He is the lead guitarist and main singer of his band, Wreck 55. He first appeared in "Happy Birthday Will". Matt first learns about the Guardians in "The Stolen Heart", when he accidentally follows Caleb and the girls through a portal and finds himself in Meridian. After seeing Will in her Guardian form, Matt considers himself a part of the team. After participating in the major events in "The Final Battle", Matt decides that he wants to help, though the Guardians (mainly Will) are reluctant, in case he should be injured. As a result of this, he asked Caleb to train him in combat.

=== Villains ===
- Prince Phobos (voiced by Mitchell Whitfield) is the primary antagonist of the first season. He is the ruler of Meridian, in spite of his missing sister Elyon being the rightful heir. He seeks to remain ruler of Meridian by defeating Elyon, the lost Princess and the Guardians of the Veil. By the end of "The Final Battle", Prince Phobos and his followers were imprisoned in the Mage's chambers in the Infinite City, an ever-expanding city beneath Meridian.
  - Lord Cedric (voiced by Dee Bradley Baker) is Phobos' right-hand man who is able to transform into a large snake/human hybrid. He commands Phobos' army of monsters and was tasked with locating the missing Princess in order for Phobos to absorb her powers. In the first season, he comes to Earth and opens a bookstore called "Ye Old Book Store" under the identity of Cedric Hoffman in order to attract the Princess.
  - The Lurdens (vocal effects provided by Dee Bradley Baker, Steve Blum, Greg Cipes, Byrne Offutt, and Mitchell Whitfield) are monstrous ogre-like creatures who have brown or green skin. They are mute, but can understand the English language.
- Jeek (voiced by Paul Eiding) is an evil Passling and Blunk's nemesis. A smuggler much like Blunk, he has a tendency to make deals with villains.
- Nerissa (voiced by Kath Soucie) is the original former Guardian of the Veil who was gifted the power of quintessence and original Keeper of the Heart of Kandrakar, the predecessor of Will, and Caleb's mother. She is introduced as the second season's primary antagonist. Nerissa aims to regain control over Kandrakar and the other magical realms. She retrieves the Heart of Meridian and the Heart of Zambala and fuses them to create the Seal of Nerissa. Nerissa establishes several groups to fight the present Guardians. These include the Knights of Vengeance, the Knights of Destruction and "C.H.Y.K.N.", the original five Guardians of the Veil, of which Nerissa is the fifth member and leader. Nerissa is later imprisoned in the Seal, trapping her in a dream world where she succeeds in conquering the universe.

==== The Knights of Vengeance ====
The following were former underlings of Phobos that were recruited into the Knights of Vengeance:

- Raythor (voiced by Steve Blum) is a high-ranking knight of Phobos who was imprisoned in the Abyss of Shadows after Will makes it appear that he stole a key to the castle. One year later, Raythor escapes the Abyss in a malnourished state and is found by Nerissa. He joins with the other knights of Phobos to form the Knights of Vengeance. Raythor is made leader since he's a good strategist, who thinks before charging into battle. Raythor has a desire for vengeance and hates Queen Elyon, the rebels, and especially the Guardians. When Phobos breaks his oath to the Guardians and releases the Lurdens and the Knights of Vengeance, Raythor is ashamed and decides to join the Guardians.
- Gargoyle (vocal effects provided by Dee Bradley Baker) is a 30 ft. rock monster who worked for Phobos, protecting and guarding the moats from any rebel that dared to try to sneak into the castle. He is very large, but he only has one eye and cannot speak, only roar. Raythor convinces Gargoyle to join the Guardians as Phobos has no loyalty, honesty, or honor.
- Tracker (voiced by Jeff Bennett) is a zombie-like creature and Phobos' most effective scout/hunter, who is often employed to locate or hunt down an individual, even if he possessed no prior knowledge of the target's whereabouts. The Tracker has an army of bats at his disposal to attack his enemies and be scouts for him, while his main weapon is a glowing green electrical chain. After Phobos' first defeat, Hunter flees the castle and is recruited by Nerissa to join her Knights of Vengeance. Tracker was later destroyed by Drake.
  - Sniffer (vocal effects provided by Dee Bradley Baker) is a huge black Dobermann-like creature with enhanced tracking abilities.
- Sandpit (vocal effects provided by Kath Soucie in "I is for Illusion", "J is for Jewel", "Y is for Yield", and "Z is for Zenith", Mitchell Whitfield in "A is for Anonymous" and "Z is for Zenith", Lloyd Sherr in "B is for Betrayal", Byrne Offutt in "C is for Changes", Greg Cipes in "E is for Enemy") is a living pit of sand that swallows and imprisons anyone who walks over it. Nerissa uses Quintessence to give Sandpit a humanoid form and recruits it into the Knights of Vengeance. When Phobos breaks his oath and attacks Meridian, freeing his minions, Sandpit is convinced by Raythor to join the Guardians.
- Frost (voiced by Dee Bradley Baker) is a high-ranking warrior in Phobos' army who also serves as his hunter and tracker. Frost challenges leadership to the Knights, but Raythor outsmarts him in a mini-battle. He participates in all the Knights' activities proving to be a useful member. Frost lacks intelligence and is a downright brute; his dimwitted-ness is shown by naming his mount Crimson. Frost is also very impatient, has a short temper, and never thinks before he acts.
  - Crimson (vocal effects provided by Michael Bell) is Frost's black and green mount that resembles a three-horned rhinoceros.
- Miranda (voiced by Grey DeLisle in most appearances, Susan Silo in monster form in "The Mudslugs", "The Rebel Rescue", and "The Final Battle") is the youngest of Phobos' associates who can transform into a four-legged, four-eyed spider-like creature. She was entrusted with spying on the Guardians on Earth as a student in Heatherfield under the name Melinda. During the second season, she is the first member recruited by Nerissa to join the Knights of Vengeance.

==== The Knights of Destruction ====
After the Knights of Vengeance were incarcerated, Nerissa formed the Knights of Destruction as her second group:

- Shagon (voiced by Jason Marsden) is the transformed state of Matt, created by Nerissa by harnessing his hatred for her and the power of the Heart of Meridian. As Shagon, Matt has a golden masked face, large black wings, and the ability to generate yellow-green light beams from his eyes, fueled by the hatred of his enemies. Matt eventually breaks free from Shagon's control by using his love for Will as a weapon and destroys Shagon's soul, therefore regaining control of himself. In the episode "U Is For Undivided", Matt is empowered by Lilian as one of her regents, allowing him to regain the form of Shagon while retaining his mind.
- Khor (vocal effects provided by Dee Bradley Baker in most appearances, Jim Cummings in "N is for Narcissist") is the transformed state of Mr. Huggles, created by Nerissa by harnessing his anger towards her and the power of the Heart of Meridian. As Khor, Mr. Huggles is a large white-skinned humanoid with a powerful jumping attack that is fueled by the anger of his enemies. Huggles eventually breaks free from Khor's control by using Nerissa's power as a weapon to destroy Khor's soul, therefore regaining control of himself. In the episode "U Is For Undivided", Huggles is empowered by Lilian as one of her regents, allowing him to regain the form of Khor while retaining his mind.
- Tridart (voiced by Jim Cummings) is one of the Four Knights of Destruction, created by Nerissa using her Quintessence power from the icy stalactites found in the cave which Nerissa was sealed in. He represents the despair Nerissa felt in her prison. Tridart has the appearance of a bald, tall, winged man made from ice. He gets his power from the despair and fear of his opponents. Tridart controls the element of ice. His weapon is an axe from which he can conjure icy blasts. He was destroyed by his own creator in "S is for Self", as he was absorbed by Nerissa when she reformed C.H.Y.K.N. to be Guardians again.
- Ember (voiced by Cree Summer) is one of the Four Knights of Destruction, given life by Nerissa with her power over Quintessence from the lava which flowed around Mount Thanos. She represents the pain that Nerissa felt for killing Cassidy. Ember has power over lava and draws strength from the pain and hurt of her opponents. Her weapon is a lava trident that shoots lava blasts. She was killed in "S is for Self" by Nerissa when she was absorbed by her.

==== C.H.Y.K.N. ====
- Cassidy (voiced by Susan Chesler) is a russet-haired woman and past Guardian of Water. She was entrusted with the Heart after Nerissa's betrayal, but was later killed by an increasingly bitter and jealous Nerissa, in retaliation, by being pushed off a cliff on Mount Thanos. In the second season, Cassidy's spirit was summoned by Nerissa using her Quintessence powers and is later restored to a physical body. After being released, she was reunited with her mother and continued the teenage life that was stolen from her forty years previously.
- Halinor (voiced by B.J. Ward) is a blonde-haired woman and past Guardian of Fire. She is kindhearted, although she can be cowardly and insecure. She did not believe that the present Guardians, Will and her friends, were strong enough to defeat the forces set against them, so during an especially hard battle she tried to steal the Aurameres in order to become a Quinto-Guardian. However, she accidentally put the Aurameres into Cornelia, who became the Quinto-Guardian instead. Nerissa used this weakness (betraying others when afraid) to take control of Halinor.
- Yan Lin Clone/Mira (voiced by Lauren Tom) - When Yan Lin is captured by her former best friend and fellow Guardian Nerissa, a clone was created by Nerissa through an Altermere which was corrupted and forced to work for Nerissa. The clone later took on the name of Mira. By the end of the series, Mira comes to live with Yan Lin, passing as her long-lost twin sister.
- Kadma (voiced by CCH Pounder) is the former Guardian of Earth. She had remained on the jungle-like world Zamballa as queen. Kadma wielded the mystical Heart of Zamballa until she was corrupted by Nerissa.

=== Recurring and supporting characters ===
==== Earth ====
===== Family =====
- Susan Vandom (voiced by Lauren Tom) is the mother of Will who works as an office worker. Susan divorced from Tony Vandom after he had left her. Susan cares so much about her daughter that she was ready to sacrifice her relationship with Dean Collins and move away from Heatherfield just because she feared Will did not like the neighborhood.
- Tony Vandom (voiced by Dan Gilvezan) is Susan's wealthy ex-husband and Will's father. He divorced Susan and disappeared for six months. Unlike the comics version, Tony is shown to be caring and has a better relationship with Will. He is now visiting and is engaged to a Sarina Sanchez, who Will believed was Nerissa.
- Anna Lair (voiced by Candi Milo) is Irma's mother. She looks a lot like Irma, only taller and with longer hair. Her personality is similar to Irma's, too, but she is a little more mature.
- Tom Lair (voiced by Byrne Offutt) is Irma's father and a police officer. He is a party maniac and a sports fan who hates when the garage gets dirty and has little patience for fussy people.
- Christopher Lair (voiced by Cesar Flores) is a brat and Irma's younger brother who enjoys annoying his sister and her friends. He is in first or second grade and likes amusement parks, toy cars, and scary stuff. He strongly resembles a male version of Irma and has exactly the same hair and eye color as she does, and also has a bit of a Spanish accent.
- Theresa Cook (voiced by Mia Korf) is Taranee's mother who works as a judge. She's very strict and does not approve of Taranee seeing Nigel after he got her in trouble for defacing a statue. This changed after she saw him do something good which Theresa vouched for him on.
- Lionel Cook (voiced by Dorian Harewood) is Taranee's stay-at-home father, a former lawyer/psychologist, and a very good cook. He is allergic to fur, and by extension, Mr. Huggles. Yet, he thinks animals are very cute and regrets his allergy.
- Peter Cook (voiced by Ogie Banks) is Taranee Cook's older brother. Peter seems to be between 16 and 18 years old. He used to date Cornelia (posing as her "older sister Lilian") while she was mad at Caleb for choosing Meridian over her. Peter has dreadlocks and is a gifted basketball player, skater, and ice skater. Taranee thinks of her brother as cool and nice.
- Elizabeth Hale (voiced by Nancy Linari) is Cornelia Hale's mother. She is always cheerful and hates the fact that Cornelia does not like to show her face that often. Elizabeth looks just like Cornelia except she has glasses and shorter hair.
- Harold Hale (voiced by Jim Cummings) is Cornelia Hale's father who is very rich and works as a bank manager. He seems to be strict in the embarrassing way, like at the car wash.
- Lilian Hale (voiced by Alyson Stoner) is Cornelia's sister. She is eight years old, and has blond hair and big blue eyes. Lilian likes to play pretend, hear fairytale stories or even play games with her classmates or sister. Annoying Cornelia and playing pranks on her has also become a hobby to her. In the second season, it is revealed that Lilian is the Heart of Earth, the center of mystical power on Earth. At Cornelia's insistence, Lilian empowers Napoleon, Matt, and Mister Huggles as her regents, allowing them to wield portions of her power until she is old enough to properly control her own magic.
- Napoleon (voiced by Edward Asner) debuted in the second-season episode "B is for Betrayal" as the Hales's family cat, during which Lilian named him Napoleon. In the episode "U is for Undivided", Lilian unintentionally gives Napoleon the capability of speech. Shortly afterward, Napoleon identifies himself as Lilian's familiar. In the same episode, Napoleon gains the ability to assume a humanoid form after Lilian empowers him, Matt, and Mister Huggles as her regents.
- Chen Lin (voiced by James Sie) is Yan Lin's son and Hay Lin's worrisome father who does not believe that she is old enough to take care of herself. He, like the rest of Hay Lin's family, is of Chinese origin. Chen co-owns The Silver Dragon restaurant.
- Joan Lin (voiced by Rosalind Chao) is Hay Lin's Chinese mother and co-owner of The Silver Dragon restaurant. She seems to be stricter than her husband but less worried about Hay Lin. Joan is not always as nervous as Chen Lin, either.
- Herbert Olsen (voiced by Val Bettin) is Matt's grandfather who seems to take on a parental role. He is very kind but not organized. Herbert owns a pet shop and gave Will a part-time job.
- Mister Huggles (vocal effects provided by Dee Bradley Baker) is Matt's pet dormouse. In "The Rebel Rescue", he was given to Will by Matt as a present as Will's mom did not allow her to keep it.

===== Sheffield Institute =====
- Principal Knickerbocker (voiced by Candi Milo) is the principal of the Sheffield Institute. Knickerbocker is strict but fair. She thinks highly of the W.I.T.C.H. girls but low of Uriah and his gang.
- Dean Collins (voiced by Cam Clarke) is a history teacher who dates Will's mother Susan. He was believed to be a monster from Meridian and was attacked by the Guardians.
- Galgheita Rudolph (voiced by Marianne Muellerleile) is a math teacher at Sheffield Academy. She is a Meridianite and the nanny who stole the Seal of Phobos and brought Elyon to Earth as a baby. In her true form, she is a frog-like creature.
- Martin Tubbs (voiced by Dee Bradley Baker) is an unpopular nerd who has a helpless crush on Irma. He sits with the group at lunch and hangs out with them a lot. Martin is also a technology expert, and knows a lot about computers and machines. He has blond hair and wears red glasses.
- Andrew Hornby (voiced by Byrne Offutt) is a cool, popular kid at school with brown hair and a dark voice and is Irma's semi-secret crush. He is a little bit older than her and in the higher grades, but Irma and Andrew do have a weak relationship, as he approves of her apologizing to Martin.
- Nigel Aschcroft (voiced by Michael Reisz) is Taranee's big crush and later her boyfriend. He is a member of Matt's band "Wreck 55", which was revealed in the episode "Walk This Way" which also began his relationship with Taranee.
- Eric Lyndon (voiced by Justin Shenkarow) is Hay Lin's crush and later boyfriend. He is a new kid in Heatherfield who lives with his grandfather, Zacharias. Eric is convinced by Uriah to join the Dunnsters, as he is good at playing the saxophone. He has shiny black hair and dark eyes.
- Uriah Dunn (voiced by Byrne Offutt) is a troublemaker at school, disliked by Elyon, Alchemy, and W.I.T.C.H. He has a gang for a while consisting of Kurt, Clubber, and Nigel. Uriah has orange spiky hair. Uriah is often getting into trouble with Principal Knickerbocker whenever he gets busted for his mischief.
  - Laurent Clubberman (voiced by Greg Cipes) is one of Uriah's gang members, Laurent Clubberman is usually called "Clubber". He is blond and fat. Clubber is shown to be actually good at art, winning the art contest for his bunny painting in "X is for Xanadu".
  - Kurt Van Buren (voiced by Steve Blum) is a member of Uriah's gang, Kurt Van Buren is very obese and has purple-dyed hair. He started learning the drums when he was six and quit when he was seven, but his short drum lessons actually helped The Dunnsters during the Battle of the Bands.
- Alchemy (voiced by Lauren Tom) is one of the best friends of Elyon and Cornelia. She has reddish-brown messy hair and big mellow-blue eyes. She is in the same classes with them, and seems to be the least feminine of them all. Whenever she is upset, she cheers up by listening to real depressing music. She has a small cat for a pet.
- Bess and Courtney Grumper (voiced by Tracy Martin and Courtney Peldon respectively) are two twin girls known as "The Grumper Sisters". They have bright red hair and green eyes. They love spreading gossip. They are into fashion, and are rivals of Cornelia.

==== Meridian ====
- Aldarn (voiced by Dee Bradley Baker) is the son of weapons maker Aketon and the second-in-command of the Meridian Rebellion. He is the best friend of Caleb and helps him in almost all his missions.
- Vathek (voiced by Lloyd Sherr) is Phobos' prison keeper, Caleb's friend, and a spy for the rebellion. After Phobos is removed from the throne, Vathek becomes the prison keeper for his cell.
- Julian (voiced by Loren Lester) is Caleb's father and former co-leader of the Meridian Rebel Army. He was believed to be dead, but Aldarn's father Aketon discovered that he was actually in prison in Phobos' underwater mines from where he was rescued.
- Drake (voiced by Michael Bell) is a captain of the rebel army and a good friend of Aldarn and Caleb. He debuted in "Walk This Way".
- Tynar (voiced by Daran Norris) is a castle guard for Phobos. When Cedric, him, and the other guards tried to capture Caleb and Blunk, he was severely wounded and left behind to rot. The Guardians decided to take him to Earth to cure him. As a reward, he decides to join the rebels and spread the knowledge that what Phobos had told them were lies.
- Thomas and Eleanor Brown (voiced by Mark L. Taylor and Vanessa Marshall respectively) are Eylon's adopted parents, Meridianites who raised her on Earth to hide her from Phobos. Their real names are Alborn and Miriadel.
- The Guards (variously voiced by Dee Bradley Baker, Joe Lala, Justin Shenkarow, Lloyd Sherr, and Frank Welker) are the regular guards of Phobos. They are large bulky men that seem to have not much of a personality, although they are capable of thinking for themselves. Some of the guards join the rebellion and help the rebels in "The Final Battle". In season 2, they become the royal guards for Elyon on the good side now.

==== Kandrakar ====
- Oracle (voiced by Michael Gough) is a powerful wizard, and mentor to both the old and new Guardians.
- Luba (voiced by Iona Morris) is a cat-like member of the Council of Kandrakar and the keeper of the Aurameres. She was forced to guard Kandrakar alone after Nerissa trapped the other Council members inside a miniature version of the Veil in season 2.
- Mage (voiced by B.J. Ward) is a powerful sorceress who guarded the Infinite City during Phobos' reign. She used the Heart of Kandrakar to create the Star of Threbe, implying that she may have once been a Guardian and the Keeper of the Heart like Will and Nerissa. It is later revealed in "O is for Obedience" that the Mage died eighteen years prior to the series beginning and Nerissa had been posing as her ever since.

==== Zamballa ====
- Ironwood (voiced by Masasa Moyo) is Zamballian, who like all Zamballians, looks like a purple tree. She is a thoughtful leader of the Zamballians. She was made Regent of Zamballa when Kadma was taken by Nerissa, and was later given the job permanently. Ironwood now holds the Heart of Zamballa.
- Bough-Breaker (voiced by Nika Futterman) is Ironwood's Zamballian son. He is still a small, young tree and obedient to his mother's advice.

== Production ==
Two seasons were produced in total, adapting plot elements from The Twelve Portals and Nerissa's Revenge comic arcs from the original series. Each season consists of twenty-six episodes, resulting in a total of fifty-two episodes overall.

An unaired 15-minute pilot episode exists, which was never fully animated. It was used to test the show with a focus group in 2003. The first episode of the series was originally meant to air on Halloween, with corresponding themes.

German network Super RTL was originally announced to be collaborating on the show alongside Jetix and France 3. However, it does not appear in the actual closing credits of the series.

=== Development ===
SIP Animation announced the production of an animated series based on the comic books in 2002. The show was immediately picked up for a full order of 52 half-hour episodes. According to Justine Cheynet (co-associate producer and co-translator in the first season, story editor in the second), SIP had come to Disney with the initiative of producing a cartoon based on the Disney-owned comics.

The first season of the show took roughly 18 months to produce, with about 200 people working on it. Work on the series began in spring 2003, in collaboration with Disney Channel. In September of that year, Andrew Nicholls and Darrell Vickers were hired as supervisory producers, and would serve as showrunners throughout the first season. Trey Callaway and Nancy Neufeld Callaway were hired as producers to both write episodes and produce the first season cast voice sessions. The show's primary target markets were considered to be Italy, France (represented by SIP Animation), the United Kingdom (Fox Kids UK), and the United States (Disney Channel). As such, while Nicholls and Vickers were officially employed by SIP, they would be working with guidance from all four of these countries.

A team of freelance writers was also brought in under their supervision, ultimately being responsible for just over half of the first season. Due to the show's unusually heavy use of continuity for a cartoon, Nicholls and Vickers planned out the season arc and even individual episode stories beforehand, and gave the other writers very careful instructions covering even smaller details of the series to avoid contradictions and repetition throughout the episodes. The director for this season was Marc Gordon-Bates, who was unfamiliar with the series and surprised that he was offered the position over other directors with greater interest in the project and more relevant prior experience.

At the outset, the show was more oriented towards comedy (early marketing described the series as an action comedy) than the original comics, which were primarily of the fantasy genre, but in common with the source material was targeted towards the female audience. Early on, the writers were informed that the show was now to be aired on Toon Disney and the Jetix block on ABC Family, as part of a changing business strategy being pursued by Michael Eisner (chairman and CEO of Disney at the time). As such, the show was reoriented to appeal more to boys, including more action and additional focus on the few major male characters. By this point, the first 7 episodes had already been fully scripted (with several more outlined), and had to be rewritten.

For the second season, Disney decided on a "darker, more fantasy-driven approach", with less humor. A completely different team of writers was hired, with Greg Weisman now serving as supervisory producer and showrunner, and Norman J. LeBlanc as the new director of the show. According to Nicholls, Weisman had decided against re-hiring him and Vickers to work on the second season due to considering them "sitcom writers". (Although W.I.T.C.H. was indeed their first non-comedy series, Nicholls has suggested that Weisman's impression may have resulted from omissions on IMDb of shows not under the auspices of the Writers Guild of America, which included numerous other animated series they had worked on.) This may have been a factor in the hiring of other comedy writers during the season, as the network considered the early scripts to have insufficient humor.

The writing team for the second season was given "marching orders" to incorporate more material from the comics, and bring the two mediums closer together. At the same time, only the first season of the show was considered official, and as such the first 26 episodes could not be contradicted, while there would continue to be certain differences from the comics. Weisman emphasized the seamless nature of the transition between seasons, especially in production aspects such as character voices and model sheets. The episode "J is for Jewel" was considered to be a turning point during the season, before which a lot of work had been done to set up the new direction of the series.

According to Justine Cheynet, the show ended after 52 episodes as a result of "very little to no interest both from the investors' and the producer's side in making a third season." There were no plans for a movie.

=== Changes from the comics ===
Although the basic structure of each season follows the respective arc of the comics, and the show shares a great deal of plot points and characters with the source material, there are many differences as well. At the start of production, the showrunners had only approximately the first 6 issues of the comics – about half of the first arc – to work with in developing the overall storyline for the season (for comparison, the first 27 issues were made available to the writers of the second season, which covered slightly beyond the end of the second arc). More than 20 creatures had been created specifically for the animated series by the end of the first season. Certain further changes requested for story reasons were denied by the network in light of the comics' popularity and existing fans.

The first season showrunners encountered numerous challenges in adapting the comics material, which had been written with a static narrative in mind, to the dynamic medium of television. According to Andrew Nicholls:

The multi-panel page format permits certain digressions from logic which, from the fluid pace of a comic book, don't become apparent. They aren't pointed-to; made obvious, by the stricter requirements of a linear timed narrative. We never understood, if the W.I.T.C.H. girls' job was to protect the good people of Meridian from this great evil in their land, and if they could open a portal anywhere they wanted... why they didn't just pop open a hole and escort all the good guys through it, back to Earth, where there was plenty of food and nice clean houses. We couldn't understand why, if this wall was created eons ago to divide Good from Evil... why there were good people living on the evil side. Nobody answered these questions to our satisfaction, they just said "Do whatever you can do."

One of the major differences is the variety of powers the Guardians have in the first season. During the screenwriting stage, questions arose from the network as to why the girls did not use their powers more in a given situation. As a result, certain powers they had in the comics were not among their abilities during the first season, such as telepathy, "instincts" about people, and communicating with appliances. In the second-season episode "C is for Changes", this changes as the Guardians gain most of the remaining powers they had in the source material.

The character of Caleb was altered significantly in the show, including his visual appearance. In the comics, he had clear facial markings that made him obviously different from a regular human. In the show, they are not present for multiple reasons: child test audiences found them unnerving; when animated, they looked too similar to a beard; and in the animated series, in contrast to the comics, he spends extended periods on Earth blending in with the inhabitants, which would be much more difficult to accomplish otherwise.

Blunk is an original character created for the cartoon, and does not appear in the comics. A comedic sidekick smuggler, his role and prominence in the story became increasingly important as the show shifted its focus from comedy to action during production of the first season, as one of the few major male characters in a series now trying to appeal to boys. The character's name was reused from a failed pilot, created by Howie Mandel and produced by Nelvana, that the first season showrunners had worked on. Second season showrunner Greg Weisman admitted to initially disliking Blunk, but came to view him as an invaluable part of the team, particularly as a result of the bonds between Blunk and the main characters that had begun to form in the first season.

In the comics, Will's dormouse is introduced quite early into the first arc. In the cartoon, this only occurs in episode 24 of the first season. Although the showrunners tried to have this take place earlier in the series, the network did not approve it for some time. According to Andrew Nicholls, this may have been due to its similarity to the naked mole rat Rufus in Kim Possible, another Disney series.

The character Vathek starts out as an enemy of the Guardians in the comics, but in the show he is already on their side. This was changed to streamline the first few episodes due to the number of characters that had to be introduced.

Early into production, Nicholls had suggested changing the name "Kandrakar" out of sensitivity toward the ongoing events in the real-life Kandahar in Afghanistan. This request was initially ignored, but ten episodes in the writing team was informed that the spelling had been changed to "Candrakar", with later episodes referring to it as "Candracar". However, the "Heart of Kandrakar" is consistently spelled that way throughout the closing credits of both seasons. Certain character names were changed as well: Laurent was referred to by his nickname "Clubber" instead as it was considered more appropriate for a bully character, and in the second season, Thomas Vandom's first name was changed to Tony for legal reasons.

=== Animation ===
The animation studios for season 1 were Wang Film Productions and Hong Ying Universe, while Dongwoo Animation animated season 2. Hong Ying and Pipangaï provided digital ink and paint services for the second season. The 3D animated design of the Heart of Kandrakar used throughout the series was made by Maga Animation Studio.

The series has been considered anime-influenced animation in terms of its visual style. First season director Marc Gordon-Bates cited anime such as Neon Genesis Evangelion as design inspiration. The original comics are themselves drawn in line with manga conventions, as opposed to the more rounded style traditionally used by publisher and co-producer Disney. Co-executive producer Olivier Dumont noted that the high-quality animation was intended to be true to the detailed artwork of the comics series.

=== Opening sequences ===
W.I.T.C.H. has different theme songs and openings, depending on country of broadcast.

The original, international title sequence shows the girls and their powers in a story version with unique footage for the opening, and music by the composers of the show, Alain Garcia and Noam Kaniel. In the original international English version, the opening theme is "W.I.T.C.H. Theme Song" (title per CD liner notes and back cover; renamed to "W.I.T.C.H (Theme)" on music streaming services) performed by Sabrina. The intro sequence of the second season, storyboarded by Richard Danto and Bruno Issaly, is changed to incorporate the new plot developments and characters, along with a remix of the theme composed by David Vadant.

The US opening shows action clips from some episodes and scenes from W.I.T.C.H. demo reels from various animation studios. The American theme song is "We Are W.I.T.C.H.", written by Adam Watts and Andy Dodd. The opening uses a demo version of the song performed by Chelsea Somma until episode 14, when it is replaced with a version sung by Marion Raven. It has been explained that once the American broadcaster had chosen to go with a different song, it was decided to make a new opening for it instead of trying to fit the existing one. The footage and theme are unchanged for the remainder of the US series; the intro stayed the same in the second season as the network "wanted consistency in case they aired both seasons simultaneously".

Both the first international theme and the US version were included on the soundtrack album Music From and Inspired By W.I.T.C.H. The US theme song was also released as a promotional two-track CD single titled "W.I.T.C.H. Cartoon: The Original Theme from the U.S.A.", which was distributed with comic issue 54, released in 2005. On this CD, the song is performed by Chelsea Somma, and it also includes an exclusive instrumental version (not available on the album) as the second track.

In Italy, a different opening consisting of clips from the show and first international intro sequence was used. The Italian theme song, simply titled "W.I.T.C.H.", was written by Max Longhi and Giorgio Vanni, and performed by the group Lucky Star(Emma Marrone was in that group). The full version of the Italian theme song was released as the first track (and promoted on the cover) of Lucky Star's 2006 album LS3, which otherwise consists of songs unrelated to the W.I.T.C.H. franchise.

== Release ==
=== Broadcast ===
In the United States, a special one-hour preview of W.I.T.C.H. aired on December 18, 2004 on the Disney-owned ABC network's Saturday morning children's programming block, ABC Kids, and on December 19 on ABC Family and Toon Disney as part of their Jetix programming blocks. The series proper premiered January 15, 2005 on ABC Kids, and ABC Family, and January 17 on Toon Disney. On January 28, 2006, the series began airing on Disney Channel.

As W.I.T.C.H. is based on a Disney comic series and was produced in association with Jetix Europe, it has been broadcast worldwide on the Disney-owned Jetix channels, as well as Jetix-branded television blocks, including that on Family in Canada (November 26, 2005 – March 10, 2007; reruns until August 26, 2007). In Canada, it was broadcast on none of the English-language terrestrial TV networks, but the French version was shown on the CBC's French-language television network Télévision de Radio-Canada (September 10, 2005 – October 27, 2007; reruns until April 25, 2010). In the United Kingdom, BBC's children's strand CBBC had aired it. In the Republic of Ireland, it was broadcast on RTÉ Two's The Den. In Australia, it was shown on Seven Network and its affiliates. In New Zealand, the show was aired on the 2 Kids block on TV2.

In France, where this TV series was primarily made, it was terrestrially broadcast on France 3. (The second season was known as Dimension W.I.T.C.H. in the country.) In Italy, where the original comic came from, it was shown on Italia 1.

=== DVD ===
W.I.T.C.H. has been released on DVD in Europe, Australia, Brazil, Malaysia, and the Philippines (also in VCD format) containing episodes of the first season, which was divided into volumes of varying number of episodes. Each volume contains 2 art cards, each featuring one of the W.I.T.C.H. girls.

In the UK, the first three volumes were released in 2006 on 1 May, 19 June, and 21 August respectively. In October 2007 the volumes were re-released as a DVD box set along with the box set of volumes four, five and six, containing the rest of season 1.

Season 2 DVDs have been released in the Czech Republic, Poland, and Russia. The Czech and Polish sets have audio available in multiple languages, including English.

=== Streaming ===
In France, both seasons have been made available for streaming via Canal+, provided by Disney Channel France which is the last channel to still air it at night-time. According to the United States Copyright Office, the series remains a property of Disney's defunct subsidiary SIP Animation, but is currently not available for streaming on Disney+.

== Reception ==
=== Critical response ===
==== Initial ====
In a review of the two-part series premiere, James Harvey of Toon Zone (now Anime Superhero) praised the opening song and animation and complimented the writing and voice acting, asserting that "W.I.T.C.H. definitely stands out as part of the Jetix blocks on ABC Family and Toon Disney." He later added in an interview with second-season supervisory producer Greg Weisman, "The series acquired a cult following during its first season [...] What makes this a unique series is the approach to the characters, all of whom are fallible and utterly human." Also reviewing the premiere, Jacqueline Cutler of The New York Times stated the series succeeds to emphasize the importance of teenage friendships between girls, while saying the show can manage to appeal to boys as well thanks to some of the characters, asserting, "Imbued with superpowers passed on by one girl's grandmother, this attractive, multicultural bunch is not your everyday coven of witches." Larisa Wiseman of Common Sense Media gave W.I.T.C.H. a grade of 3 out of 5 stars, praised the depiction of positive messages, citing teamwork and kindness across the characters, writing, "The five main characters are ethnically diverse and are good role models for girls because they're independent thinkers and deal with challenges head-on."

==== Retrospective ====
The television series saw more critical attention in the early 2020s, following the comics reprints, which began in 2017, and the 2021 reimagining of competing series Winx Club as the live-action Fate: The Winx Saga, which spawned new comparisons between the two franchises.

In 2019, Ara Wagoner of Android Central asserted, "This is a Jetix throwback, but W.I.T.C.H. is a cool comic series and it deserves to be on Disney+, even with all the nonsense that went on during its production. Also, if Disney is looking to reboot some series for D+, this would be a great place to start so that we could have a consistent vision and throw the focus back on our female superhero girls."

In 2020, Laura Thornton of Comic Book Resources praised the diversity across the main characters, citing their personality and different supernatural abilities, and found that the show depicts themes of determination, friendship, and love, while balancing between action, comedy, and drama, writing, "A real gem of the '00s, the show definitely deserves a second chance, and a spot, on Disney+ — hopefully sooner, rather than later." Juliana Failde of Screen Rant ranked W.I.T.C.H. 3rd in their "10 Classic Children's Shows That You Still Can't Stream For Free Today" list, describing W.I.T.C.H. as a classic children's show, stating, "W.I.T.C.H. was a super cool show on Disney's Jetix that followed five totally normal girls who become the Guardians of the Veil with powers to manipulate the elements. This show is like Sailor Moon and Avatar: The Last Airbender combined but with fairy-like heroines and mythical worlds. This show was one of those series that is still often spoken of today and made remembered by all the fans who watched it."

In 2021, Petrana Radulovic of Polygon compared W.I.T.C.H. very favorably to Winx Club, another magical girl series that had also debuted in 2004, describing it as an exciting fantasy story with a diverse cast, saying that "W.I.T.C.H. is also ahead of Winx Club when dealing with complicated relationships with mentor figures." She further argued that the revival Fate: The Winx Saga would have worked better as an adaptation of W.I.T.C.H. based on the latter's darker and more complex themes, asserting: "The memory of W.I.T.C.H. lives on — in Tumblr posts, in fan art, and in the striking parallels of a live-action show about 2004's other five-member magical girl show. Maybe one day it'll land on Disney Plus, but until then, Fate: The Winx Saga will have to suffice." Yelyzaveta Tretiakova of Comic Book Resources compared W.I.T.C.H. to Winx Club and stated that both shows manage to surpass the other in several fields, saying that W.I.T.C.H. provides better vilains, comedy scenes, visuals, comic books, and fashionable characters.

In 2022, Kyle Grammatica of Collider referred to W.I.T.C.H. as one of the "must-watch French cartoons," noting that "the show offers compelling action and stories that can be enjoyed by kids of any age (and plenty of adults too)." Priya Paramanandam of Comic Book Resources ranked W.I.T.C.H. 1st in their "15 Great Animated Shows Missing From Disney+" list, calling it a "popular Jetix show," writing, "A highly imaginative show with lots of lore and world-building, W.I.T.C.H. also centered around the trials of friendship and girlhood. For many viewers, it remains a beloved favorite," and included it in their "10 Must-Watch French Cartoons, From Arcane to Totally Spies!" list, describing the series as "a highly imaginative show with lots of lore and world-building", and complained that it was missing on Disney+ despite Disney retaining the rights, while Maham Arsalan included it in their "Best Anime to Check Out After Finishing Winx Club" list, asserting, "The magical girl elements are greatly justified in this series, especially when compared to Winx Club." Layann Basileh of Game Rant ranked W.I.T.C.H 7th in their "8 Great Magical Girl Shows That Aren't Anime" list, calling it one of the "brilliant magical girl shows that have been developed internationally."

=== Ratings ===
In the early stages of the first season, the series was a major hit and a TV breakout in the US. The two-episode premiere registered record ratings across ABC Kids and the Jetix blocks on ABC Family and Toon Disney, both as a preview and in regular airings.

In Europe, W.I.T.C.H. was the most popular Jetix original series for third-party sales as of fiscal year 2007, when the second season was delivered. All of the major Jetix Europe originals, including W.I.T.C.H., ranked "as one of the top two shows in their timeslots in all of the markets in which they aired."

=== Accolades ===
In 2006, the Casting Society of America's Artios Award nominated Joey Paul Jensen for Outstanding Achievement in Casting: Animation TV Programming.

== See also ==
- Avatar: The Last Airbender, another animated series featuring characters who can control the elements
