= Norman Francis Vandivier =

Recipient of the Navy Cross

- Born: March 10, 1916; Edwards, Mississippi
- Died: June 4, 1942 (aged 26) near Midway Atoll
- Military career
- Allegiance: United States of America
- Branch: United States Naval Reserve
- Service years: 1935–1942
- Rank: Lieutenant Junior Grade (Posthumously)
- Unit: Enterprise (CV-6)
- Conflicts: World War II; *Battle of Midway
- Awards: Navy Cross (posthumous); Air Medal

Norman Francis Vandivier (March 10, 1916 – June 4, 1942) was a United States Navy aviator during World War II. He was posthumously awarded the Navy Cross for action during the Battle of Midway.

== Biography ==
Norman Vandivier was born on March 10, 1916, in Edwards, Mississippi. He entered the Indiana National Guard in 1935 and was promoted to corporal before he completed his enlistment on July 1, 1938. He enlisted in the Navy on July 6, 1939, at Grosse Ile, Michigan, for aviation training and was enrolled as a seaman second class. On October 20, Vandivier took the oath of office as an aviation cadet in the United States Naval Reserve and soon began pilot training at Pensacola, Florida. He received his wings on May 21, 1940, when he was designated a naval aviator. At the completion of additional training, he was commissioned an ensign in the Naval Reserve on June 28, 1940. That same day, he was assigned to Bombing Squadron 6 (VB-6) on board the aircraft carrier Enterprise (CV-6), to which he reported on August 1.

== Pacific Ocean operations ==
Ens. Vandivier served in Enterprise throughout his brief naval career. Between August 1940 and December 1941, he flew training missions from her flight deck and cruised between the islands of the Pacific Ocean. However, during those relatively idyllic months, relations between the United States and Japan steadily deteriorated. On the morning of December 7, 1941, events came to a head when the Japanese launched a surprise air attack on Pearl Harbor.

At that time, Ens. Vandivier was on board the Enterprise which was some 200 miles (400 km) from the battle and on her way back to Hawaii after ferrying United States Marine Corps Fighter Squadron 211 (VMF-211) to Wake Island. Rather than return to port, Enterprise conducted a fruitless search for the attacking enemy force. She finally put into Pearl Harbor on the afternoon of December 8 to refuel and replenish before again getting underway the next morning to resume patrols which continued through the end of the year.

On January 11, 1942, the carrier departed Pearl Harbor to assist the Yorktown (CV-5) task force in protecting a reinforcement convoy which safely disembarked its marines at Samoa on the 23d.

Two days later, the Enterprise task force was ordered to head for the Marshall Islands and begin America's first offensive action against the Japanese Empire. Bombing Squadron 6 flew off Enterprise just before dawn on February 1, and its three divisions winged toward Kwajalein. Ens. Vandivier and his comrades reached that atoll just before 07:30, divided themselves into two flights, and immediately began their attack. Vandivier flew the second plane in the 2d division, and so his was probably the 7th or 8th plane to dive on the ships and installations located near and on Kwajalein islet at the extreme southeastern end of the atoll. Because of the fires and smoke caused by his predecessors' bombs and the dangerously low altitude to which he dove before dropping his bombs, the results of Ens. Vandivier's drop were not readily discernible. However, the fact that he continued his dive until almost the last possible moment makes it highly probable that his attack was successful. Later, he was credited with a near miss on a cargo ship. Subsequently, he destroyed a barracks and received the Air Medal for "... meritorious conduct ..." during the raid.

Ens. Vandivier landed on Enterprise around 09:00. Within 45 minutes, his plane was rearmed, refueled, and back in the air making for Maloelap Atoll. At 10:30, he followed his division leader into a steep dive on Taroa islet and delivered another successful attack on enemy installations. After that raid, Vandivier returned to his ship which rapidly moved out of the area.

== Bombing of Wake Island ==
The young Navy pilot's next action came on February 25 when Bombing Squadron 6 and Scouting Squadron 6 (VS-6) flew off Enterprise to bomb Wake Island, by then in Japanese possession. A week later, he rose from Enterprise's flight deck to strike Marcus Island. While this attack, like the one on Wake Island, was of limited strategic value, the entire series of raids offered Ens. Vandivier and his comrades invaluable flying experience.

In April, Enterprise provided air cover for Hornet (CV-8) which was carrying 16 Army, twin-engine B-25s under the command of Lt. Col. James Doolittle. Ens. Vandivier made his closest approach to Japan on April 18 when the bombers rose from Hornet to make their daring one-way raid on Tokyo. Immediately after the launch, the two carriers and their escorts reversed course and cleared the area. Vandivier reentered Pearl Harbor on April 25. Five days later, Enterprise took the flyer to sea once more and raced to reinforce carriers Lexington (CV-2) and Yorktown (CV-5) in the South Pacific. However, time and distance conspired to prevent Ens. Vandivier from participating in the Battle of the Coral Sea, which ended before his ship could reach the area. Enterprise was ordered back to Hawaii to ready herself for an even more important mission.

The Enterprise returned to Pearl Harbor on May 26. Ens. Vandivier and his shipmates began feverish preparations to meet an expected Japanese thrust at Midway Island. Two days later, his ship headed back to sea to take station off Midway Island. On the 30th, Yorktown put to sea to join Hornet and Enterprise some 235 miles (435 km) northeast of Midway. Planes from the three carriers searched diligently for the enemy force during the next three days; but it was a Midway-based PBY Catalina flying boat that made first contact with the Japanese invasion force on the morning of June 3, about 700 miles (1,300 km) from the island.

== Battle of Midway Island ==
While Midway-based bombers attacked the enemy transport force that afternoon, Ens. Vandivier waited with the other pilots for news of their own special targets — the Japanese carriers. At 05:45 the following morning, another Catalina from Midway Island found the enemy flattops. Enterprise and Hornet raced to close the Japanese while Yorktown recovered search planes.

At about 07:05, Enterprise planes began rumbling down her flight deck and wobbling into the air. By 07:30, the whole attack group was aloft. As they made off to attack the enemy, Ens. Vandivier formed his SBD Dauntless dive bomber up with the other planes of Bombing 6's 3d Division. Led by the carrier's group commander, Lt. Comdr. Wade McClusky, the formation winged its way toward the enemy carrier striking force, composed of four of the six carriers which had attacked Pearl Harbor.

At 09:20 when the planes reached the point where they expected to find the enemy carriers, the airmen gazed down upon empty ocean. At this point, the air group commander made a hard decision. His planes were low on fuel; and, if they initiated a search, some aircraft might not make it back to the carriers. On the other hand, if the strike returned to Enterprise and missed the enemy carriers, Midway Island might fall. Worse yet, Japanese bombers might knock out Enterprise, Hornet, and Yorktown, leaving little or nothing between America and the forces of the Japanese Empire. Therefore, the American pilots ignored their fuel problem and began searching for the enemy. At 10:05, they spied, on the horizon to the northwest, the silhouettes of three large carriers and a number of escorts. At first, several pilots thought that their leader had brought them back to their own ships; but closer inspection revealed pagoda masts and yellow flight decks. These ships could only be Japanese.

As the attack commenced, the Dauntless dive bombers of Bombing 6 jockeyed for position with those of Scouting 6. Vandivier's division followed the 2d division whose commander saw that many of Scouting 6's bombs were missing the "left hand" aircraft carrier — now known to have been Admiral Chuichi Nagumo's flagship Akagi. Rather than follow the 1st division in its attack on Kaga, which seemed well taken care of with critical hits, the 2d and 3d divisions bore down on Akagi. In due course, it was Ens. Vandivier's turn. Over he went and then down, toward the flagship of the Pearl Harbor attack force. He released his bomb — whether or not it was a hit or a near miss will never be known — and pulled out of the dive. He banked his plane and headed home. He later reported by radio that he was making a water landing, but he and his gunner Lee Edward Keaney, despite searches by the US Navy, they were never seen nor head again.

== Awarded Navy Cross ==
His bravery is indicative of the spirit and determination which, perhaps above all else, won the crucial Battle of Midway for America and paved the way for ultimate victory. For his selfless contributions to that victory, Ens. Vandivier — promoted to lieutenant (junior grade) on June 30, 1942, retroactively to April 15, 1942 — was awarded the Navy Cross, posthumously, for "... extraordinary heroism and distinguished service. ..."

== Namesake ==
In 1943, the United States Navy named the destroyer escort USS Vandivier (DER-540) in honor of Vandivier and his heroic efforts. Vandivier (DER-540) was laid down at the Boston Navy Yard on November 8, 1943, as a John C. Butler-class destroyer escort DE-540; launched on December 27, 1943; and was sponsored by Mrs. Mary Hardin Vandivier.

== Film ==
His story was told via the 2019 movie Dauntless: The Battle of Midway.

== See also ==
- List of United States Navy ships
- World War II
- USS Vandivier (DER-540)
