= USS Vandivier =

John C. Butler-class destroyer escort of the United States Navy

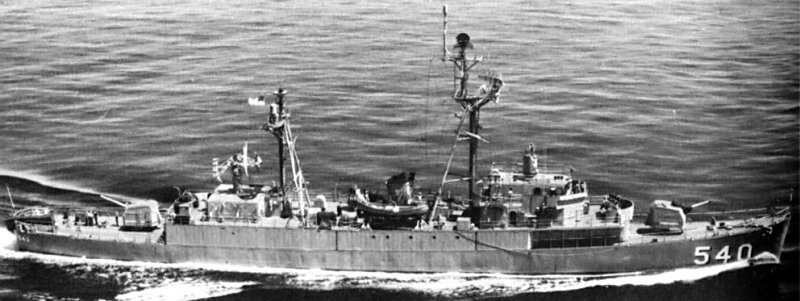

History

United States
- Namesake: Norman Francis Vandivier
- Builder: Boston Navy Yard
- Laid down: 8 November 1943
- Launched: 27 December 1943
- Commissioned: 11 October 1955
- Decommissioned: 30 June 1960
- Reclassified: DER-540 on 2 September 1954
- Stricken: 1 November 1974
- Fate: Sunk as target off Florida on, 7 February 1975

General characteristics
- Class & type: John C. Butler-class destroyer escort
- Displacement: 1,350 long tons (1,372 t)
- Length: 306 ft (93 m)
- Beam: 36 ft 8 in (11.18 m)
- Draft: 9 ft 5 in (2.87 m)
- Propulsion: 2 boilers, 2 geared turbine engines, 12,000 shp (8,900 kW); 2 propellers
- Speed: 24 knots (44 km/h; 28 mph)
- Range: 6,000 nmi (11,000 km; 6,900 mi) at 12 knots (22 km/h; 14 mph)
- Complement: 14 officers, 201 enlisted
- Armament: 2 × single 5 in (127 mm) guns; 2 × twin 40 mm (1.6 in) AA guns; 10 × single 20 mm (0.79 in) AA guns; 1 × triple 21 in (533 mm) torpedo tubes; 8 × depth charge throwers; 1 × Hedgehog ASW mortar; 2 × depth charge racks

USS Vandivier (DER-540) John C. Butler-class destroyer escort in service the United States Navy from 1955 to 1960. She had been launched in 1943 but her construction was suspended until 1954. She was completed as a radar picket ship. After only five years of service she was laid up and later sunk as a target in 1975.

== History ==
Vandivier was named by the U.S. Navy in honor of Norman Francis Vandivier who was awarded the Navy Cross. She was laid down at the Boston Navy Yard on 8 November 1943 as a John C. Butler-class destroyer escort DE-540; launched on 27 December 1943; and was sponsored by Mrs. Mary Hardin Vandivier. Since World War II came to an end before she was completed, work on her gradually tapered off and was finally suspended on 17 February 1947. Seven years later, on 1 July 1954, work was resumed to complete her and to convert her to a destroyer escort radar picket ship. She was redesignated DER-540 on 2 September 1954 and was placed in commission on 11 October 1955.

During the remainder of 1955, Vandivier completed outfitting at Boston, Massachusetts, moved to Newport, Rhode Island, and prepared for her shakedown cruise. On 14 January 1956, she cleared Newport to conduct her shakedown training in the West Indies. Over the next two months, she operated in the vicinity of Roosevelt Roads, Puerto Rico, and near Guantánamo Bay, Cuba. She also made port visits to Ponce and San Juan in Puerto Rico as well as to Guantánamo Bay and Havana in Cuba.

On 15 March, Vandivier departed Havana to return to New England. She arrived at Boston on the 20th and underwent post-shakedown availability there until the second week in April, when she returned to Newport to begin duty as a radar picket ship with the Atlantic Fleet.

Throughout her brief U.S. Navy career as an active unit of the fleet, Vandivier served along the Atlantic Ocean seaboard and operated out of Newport, Rhode Island. Her duties consisted solely of patrols off the coast as a seagoing extension of the distant early warning system during the height of the Cold War. She cruised on station for periods of approximately two weeks in duration while her radar equipment scanned the horizon for any airborne intruders—missiles or planes. When not on station, she conducted upkeep in port at Newport and made special event cruises. In 1956, she conducted cruises for the American Society of Planners and for women officer candidates as well as for her crewmen's families.

She began 1957 with duty on the picket station between 2 and 16 January and again from 28 January to 7 February. Following upkeep and a three-month overhaul, she headed south to Guantánamo Bay, Cuba, on 10 June. Arriving there four days later, Vandivier conducted refresher training until mid-July. On the 12th, she departed Cuban waters to return north. After a brief stopover at Norfolk, Virginia she continued north to Fall River, Massachusetts. Upon completion of the availability, the ship got underway on 1 August and steamed toward Rockland, Maine, to participate in the Maine Seafood Festival. On 4 August, she put to sea to resume radar picket duty. For the remainder of the year, Vandivier alternated between two-week tours of duty on the picket line with one-week in-port periods at Newport.

The year 1958 began much the same way as the previous year ended. Until May, the warship stood 14-day watches on the radar picket station followed by a week of upkeep in Newport. On 8 May, she stood out of Newport for a visit to Bermuda in the British West Indies. After a three-day visit, she resumed her routine on the so-called Atlantic Barrier Patrol until September. On 20 September, she had the honor of escorting President Dwight D. Eisenhower during the America's Cup Races held off Narragansett Bay. On the following day, Vandivier resumed duty guarding the country from the threat of aerial sneak attack.

That duty occupied her for the remainder of 1958 and all of 1959. Throughout 1959, only two events varied her routine of radar picket operation out of Newport. In April, she made a two-day visit to Bermuda; and, on 5 September, she made another dependents' cruise for the families of her officers and men. Otherwise, it was business as usual—two weeks on station followed by a week in Newport—with periodic availabilities thrown in for good measure. The year 1960 brought more of the same duty but only for part of the year.

On 30 June 1960, after all preparations, Vandivier was decommissioned and placed in reserve with the Philadelphia, Pennsylvania Group, Atlantic Reserve Fleet. Vandivier remained in reserve until late 1974 when she was sunk as a target. Her name was struck from the Navy list on 1 November 1974.
