= Franklin Wonder Five =

1920s high school and college basketball team

- Left to right: Burl Friddle, Ralph Hicks, Paul White, Robert "Fuzzy" Vandivier, Sima Comer, Johnny Gant, Harold Borden, Pete Keeling, coach Ernest "Griz" Wagner

Accomplishments and honors

Championships
- Indiana High School State Champion 1920, 1921, 1922; Indiana State Collegiate Champion 1923, 1924; National Collegiate Champion 1923 (undefeated)

The Franklin Wonder Five was a 1920s high school basketball team from Indiana's "Hoosier Hysteria" era. With basketball king in Indiana, the team from Franklin was dubbed the "Wonder Five." This small town about 20 miles south of Indianapolis produced a team that captured the Indiana State Basketball Championship for three consecutive years: 1920–1922. They became national college champions in 1923, playing with Franklin College and staying undefeated against teams from major universities. While they passed on a match with the New York Celtics, they twice defeated the Omars, a professional Midwest team.

== History ==
Cover of the 1986 book, The Franklin Wonder Five: A Complete History of the Legendary Basketball Team. Team members pictured are Robert "Fuzzy" Vandivier and Carlyle Friddle (front row), Johnny Gant and Jimmy Ross (2nd row), Harry King, James Wendell "Ike" Ballard, Charlton "Butter" Williams and Hubert Davis (3rd row), and coach Griz Wagner in the back.

The boys had started playing together as children and developed synergy. In high school, they thrived under the coaching of Ernest "Griz" Wagner and had a 104 to 10 win/loss record in their four years. After their high school successes, most members of the team followed Wagner to Franklin College, where he became basketball coach. At the time, total enrollment of the college was around 350 students.

The "Wonder Five" team took on those of large universities, including Notre Dame, Illinois, Purdue, and Wisconsin. The team was undefeated in its first college season of 1922–23 and became national champions. It was not until February 1924 that the team suffered its first defeat, by Butler University, ending a string of 50 consecutive victories over a 2-season span. After ending the 1923 season undefeated, the "Wonder Five" were proclaimed nationally; the Detroit Free Press wrote: "Not only has this team been the best Franklin College ever had, but it is considered as the best collegiate team ever seen in Hoosierdom, the basketball center of the world." Later Coach Wagner turned down an offer to play the New York Celtics, the top professional team in the nation, saying his team was "ready for a rest."

The leading scorer on the Wonder Five was "Fuzzy" Vandivier. In 1924, the Chicago Tribune named him one of the "Five Best Players" in the nation. Coach John Wooden, of UCLA fame, considered Fuzzy the greatest high school basketball player he had ever seen. After graduation, Vandivier returned to Franklin High School as the basketball coach. In 1939 he led the team to a runner-up in the state basketball tournament. He retired from coaching in 1944 but continued as the school's athletic director, as well as teaching history.

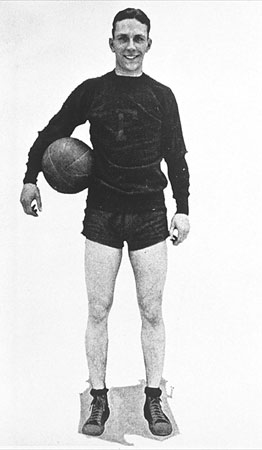
Robert "Fuzzy" Vandivier, Indiana native Hall of Fame basketball player, 1920s.

Since the years of the "Wonder Five," the Franklin High School team took the nickname of Grizzly Cubs, and Franklin College athletic teams took the Grizzlies, both in honor of "Griz" Wagner. In 1980, Franklin College unveiled a banner proclaiming the "Wonder Five" as national college champions of 1923.

== In popular culture ==
In 1986, Phillip Ellett wrote a history of the team, entitled The Franklin Wonder Five: A Complete History of the Legendary Basketball Team.
