= Art Grove =

American basketball player

Personal information
- Born: March 17, 1923 Daviess County, Indiana, U.S.
- Died: May 25, 1984 (aged 61) Washington, Indiana, U.S.
- Listed height: 6 ft 0 in (1.83 m)
- Listed weight: 185 lb (84 kg)

Career information
- High school: Washington (Washington, Indiana)
- College: Toledo (1942–1943)
- Position: Guard

Career history
- 1946–1947: Pocatello Simplots
- 1947–1948: Louisville Colonels
- 1948: Hammond Calumet Buccaneers
- 1948–1949: Montgomery Rebels

Robert Arthur Grove (March 17, 1923 – May 25, 1984) was an American professional basketball player. He played for the Hammond Calumet Buccaneers in the National Basketball League for one game during the 1948–49 season, among several other teams in various leagues.
