= Fuzzy Vandivier =

American basketball player (1903–1983)

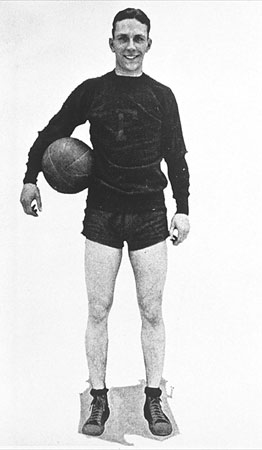
- Vandivier, c. 1920s

Personal information
- Born: December 26, 1903
- Died: July 30, 1983 (aged 79)

Career information
- High school: Franklin (Franklin, Indiana)
- College: Franklin (1922–1926)
- Coaching career: 1926–1944

Career history

Coaching
- 1926–1944: Franklin HS

Robert P. "Fuzzy" Vandivier (December 26, 1903 – July 30, 1983) was an American high school and collegiate basketball player during the 1920s.

At Franklin High School he led a squad nicknamed "Franklin Wonder Five", a team that compiled an 89–9 record, won three state championships (1920, 1921, 1922) and is considered the greatest Indiana High School team of all time.

Vandivier was named All-State three times (1920, 1921, 1922), becoming the first player ever to achieve this feat (since then, John Wooden, Oscar Robertson and George McGinnis also achieved this level of success). Hall of Fame coach John Wooden considered Vandivier the greatest high school basketball player of all time.

Following his outstanding high school career, Vandivier attended local Franklin College (1922–26). In each year he was named All-State, and in 1926 he was an All-Midwest College All-Star. Due to a painful back ailment in his senior year, Vandivier's playing career was cut short. After graduating from Franklin, he returned as basketball coach to his high school. Vandivier coached the Franklin High School basketball team from 1926 to 1944. In 1939, under his leadership, they earned a place in the Indiana state finals.
