= 2019–20 Nebraska Cornhuskers men's basketball team =

American college basketball season

2019–20 Nebraska Cornhuskers men's basketball
- Conference: Big Ten Conference
- Record: 7–25 (2–18 Big Ten)
- Head coach: Fred Hoiberg (1st season)
- Assistant coaches: Armon Gates; Matt Abdelmassih; Doc Sadler; Bobby Lutz
- Home arena: Pinnacle Bank Arena

2019–20 Big Ten Conference men's basketball standings
	Conf.				Overall
Team	W		L	PCT	W		L	PCT
No. 17 Wisconsin	14	–	6	.700	21	–	10	.677
No. 9 Michigan State	14	–	6	.700	22	–	9	.710
No. 12 Maryland	14	–	6	.700	24	–	7	.774
No. 21 Illinois	13	–	7	.650	21	–	10	.677
No. 25 Iowa	11	–	9	.550	20	–	11	.645
Penn State	11	–	9	.550	21	–	10	.677
No. 19 Ohio State	11	–	9	.550	21	–	10	.677
Rutgers	11	–	9	.550	20	–	11	.645
Michigan	10	–	10	.500	19	–	12	.613
Purdue	9	–	11	.450	16	–	15	.516
Indiana	9	–	11	.450	20	–	12	.625
Minnesota	8	–	12	.400	15	–	16	.484
Northwestern	3	–	17	.150	8	–	23	.258
Nebraska	2	–	18	.100	7	–	25	.219
The 2020 Big Ten tournament was canceled prior to the second round due to the COVID-19 pandemic. Rankings from AP poll

The 2019–20 Nebraska Cornhuskers men's basketball team represented the University of Nebraska–Lincoln in the 2019–20 NCAA Division I men's basketball season. The Cornhuskers were led by first-year coach head coach Fred Hoiberg and play their home games at Pinnacle Bank Arena in Lincoln, Nebraska as members of the Big Ten Conference. They finished the season 7–25, 2–18 in Big Ten play to finish in last place. They lost to Indiana in the first round of the Big Ten tournament which was subsequently canceled due to the COVID-19 pandemic.

In the final game of the season against Indiana, Fred Hoiberg appeared ill during the game, left the game in the second half, and was taken to the hospital. He was tested for COVID-19 due to the ongoing pandemic, but he was diagnosed with influenza. As a result of Hoiberg's sickness, the team was quarantined in the locker room following the Indiana game for a short period of time.

== Previous season ==
The Cornhuskers finished the 2017–18 season 19–17, 6–14 in Big Ten play to finish second-to-last. As the No. 13 seed in the Big Ten tournament, they made a run but lost in the quarterfinals to Wisconsin. Despite winning 13 Big Ten games, the Cornhuskers received a bid to the National Invitation Tournament. They won in the first round of the NIT to Mississippi State but lost in the second round to TCU.

Following the season, head coach Tim Miles was fired, after having led the team after seven seasons. Four days later, the school hired former Chicago Bulls' head coach Fred Hoiberg as the next head coach of the program.

== Offseason ==
Due to a change in coaching staff, Nebraska experienced a near-complete overhaul of its roster, retaining only two players from the previous season (only one of which had seen any playing time for Nebraska). The rebuilt team took an exhibition trip to Italy; a documentary on the trip was filmed by the Big Ten Network.

=== Departures ===
Name	No.	Pos.	Height	Weight	Year	Hometown	Notes
James Palmer Jr.	0	G	6'6"	207	SR	Upper Marlboro, MD	Graduated
Johnny Trueblood	4	G	6'3"	194	SR	Omaha, NE	Graduated; walk-on.
Glynn Watson Jr.	5	G	6'0"	180	SR	Bellwood, IL	Graduated
Isaac Copeland Jr.	14	F	6'9"	225	SR	Raleigh, NC	Graduated
Tanner Borchardt	20	F	6'8"	250	SR	Gothenburg, NE	Graduated
Isaiah Roby	15	F	6'8"	230	JR	Dixon, IL	Declared for the 2019 NBA draft; selected 45th overall by the Detroit Pistons.
Thomas Allen	12	G	6'1"	184	SO	Raleigh, NC	Transferred to NC State.
Nana Akenten	25	G	6'6"	218	SO	Bolingbrook, IL	Indefinitely suspended prior to end of previous season. Transferred to Southeast Missouri State.
Dedoch Chan	2	F	6'8"	210	SO (incoming)	Rochester, MN	Transferred to Indian Hills CC, left team before start of 2018–19 season.
Justin Costello	33	F	6'1"	200	RS FR	Elkhorn, NE	Transferred to McCook CC; walk-on.
Brady Heiman	45	F	6'11"	215	FR	Springfield, NE	Transferred to South Dakota.
Amir Harris	1	G	6'4"	205	FR	Frederick, MD	Transferred to George Washington.
Karrington Davis	10	G	6'6"	215	FR	St. Louis, MO	Transferred to Southern Illinois.

=== Incoming transfers ===
Name	No.	Pos.	Height	Weight	Year	Hometown	Previous school
Haanif Cheatham	22	G	6 ft 5 in	195 lb	Senior (graduate transfer)	Fort Lauderdale, FL	Florida Gulf Coast
Matej Kavaš	25	G	6 ft 8 in	200 lb	Senior (graduate transfer)	Ljubljana, Slovenia	Seattle
Shamiel Stevenson	4	F	6 ft 6 in	245 lb	Junior	Toronto, ON, Canada	Nevada
Derrick Walker	13	F	6 ft 8 in	236 lb	Junior	Kansas City, MO	Tennessee
Dalano Banton	45	G	6 ft 8 in	185 lb	Sophomore	Toronto, ON, Canada	Western Kentucky

=== Other arrivals ===
Noah Vedral and Brant Banks, two members of the Nebraska Cornhuskers football team joined the team as emergency back-ups prior to the 2020 Big Ten Conference men's basketball tournament due to depth issues.

=== Recruiting classes ===
==== 2019 recruiting class ====
College recruiting
Name	Hometown	School	Height	Weight	Commit date
Jervay Green; SG	Denver, CO	George Washington (CO); Western Nebraska CC	6 ft 3 in (1.91 m)	210 lb (95 kg)	Sep 23, 2018
Jervay Green; SG	Recruit ratings: 247Sports:				
Cameron Mack; SG	Austin, TX	Christian Life Prep (TX); Salt Lake CC	6 ft 2 in (1.88 m)	175 lb (79 kg)	Apr 27, 2019
Cameron Mack; SG	Recruit ratings: 247Sports:				
Akol Arop; SF	Omaha, NE	Creighton Prep (NE)	6 ft 5 in (1.96 m)	190 lb (86 kg)	Oct 3, 2018
Akol Arop; SF	Recruit ratings: 247Sports:				
Jace Piatkowski; SG (walk-on)	Elkhorn, NE	Elkhorn South (NE)	6 ft 4 in (1.93 m)	170 lb (77 kg)	Apr 18, 2019
Jace Piatkowski; SG (walk-on)	Recruit ratings: No ratings found				
Charlie Easley; G (walk-on)	Lincoln, NE	Pius X (NE)	6 ft 2 in (1.88 m)	190 lb (86 kg)	May 6, 2019
Charlie Easley; G (walk-on)	Recruit ratings: No ratings found				
Yvan Ouedraogo; F	Bordeaux, France	INSEP	6 ft 8 in (2.03 m)	230 lb (100 kg)	May 12, 2019
Yvan Ouedraogo; F	Recruit ratings: 247Sports:				
Kevin Cross Jr. PF	Little Rock, AR	Mills (AR)	6 ft 8 in (2.03 m)	240 lb (110 kg)	May 13, 2019
Kevin Cross Jr. PF	Recruit ratings: Rivals:				
Samari Curtis; SG	Xenia, OH	Xenia (OH)	6 ft 3 in (1.91 m)	175 lb (79 kg)	May 15, 2019
Samari Curtis; SG	Recruit ratings: Rivals: 247Sports: ESPN: (80)				
Bret Porter; F (walk-on)	Omaha, NE	Millard North (NE)	6 ft 6 in (1.98 m)	2,015 lb (914 kg)	Jun 6, 2019
Bret Porter; F (walk-on)	Recruit ratings: No ratings found				
Overall recruit ranking: 247Sports: 52
Note: In many cases, Scout, Rivals, 247Sports, On3, and ESPN may conflict in their listings of height and weight.; In these cases, the average was taken. ESPN grades are on a 100-point scale.; Sources: "2019 Team Ranking". Rivals.

== Roster ==
2018–19 Nebraska Cornhuskers men's basketball team
Players
Coaches

Pos.	#	Name	Height	Weight	Year	Previous school	Hometown
F	0	Akol Arop	6 ft 5 in (1.96 m)	190 lb (86 kg)	Fr	Creighton Prep HS	Omaha, NE
F	1	Kevin Cross Jr.	6 ft 8 in (2.03 m)	240 lb (109 kg)	Fr	Mills HS	Little Rock, AR
G	2	Noah Vedral	6 ft 1 in (1.85 m)	200 lb (91 kg)	RS So	Bishop Neumann HS	Wahoo, NE
G	3	Cam Mack (S)	6 ft 2 in (1.88 m)	175 lb (79 kg)	RS So	Salt Lake CC	Austin, TX
G	4	Shamiel Stevenson (I) (redshirt)	6 ft 6 in (1.98 m)	245 lb (111 kg)	Jr	Nevada	Toronto, ON, Canada
G	11	Dachon Burke (S)	6 ft 4 in (1.93 m)	180 lb (82 kg)	RS Jr	Robert Morris	Orange, NJ
F	13	Derrick Walker (I) (redshirt)	6 ft 8 in (2.03 m)	235 lb (107 kg)	Jr	Tennessee	Kansas City, MO
F	15	Samari Curtis	6 ft 3 in (1.91 m)	175 lb (79 kg)	Fr	Xenia HS	Xenia, OH
G	21	Jace Piatkowski (W)	6 ft 4 in (1.93 m)	170 lb (77 kg)	Fr	Elkhorn South HS	Elkhorn, NE
G	22	Haanif Cheatham	6 ft 5 in (1.96 m)	195 lb (88 kg)	RS Sr	Florida Gulf Coast	Fort Lauderdale, FL
G	23	Jervay Green	6 ft 3 in (1.91 m)	210 lb (95 kg)	Jr	Western Nebraska CC	Denver, CO
F	24	Yvan Ouedraogo	6 ft 8 in (2.03 m)	230 lb (104 kg)	Fr	INSEP	Bordeaux, France
G	25	Matej Kavaš (injured)	6 ft 8 in (2.03 m)	200 lb (91 kg)	Sr	Seattle	Ljubljana, Slovenia
G	30	Charlie Easley	6 ft 2 in (1.88 m)	190 lb (86 kg)	Fr	Pius X HS	Lincoln, NE
F	32	Brant Banks	6 ft 7 in (2.01 m)	300 lb (136 kg)	RS Fr	Westbury Christian HS	Houston, TX
G	34	Þórir Þorbjarnarson	6 ft 6 in (1.98 m)	206 lb (93 kg)	Jr	Menntaskólinn í Reykjavík	Akureyri, Iceland
F	44	Bret Porter (W)	6 ft 6 in (1.98 m)	215 lb (98 kg)	Fr	Millard North HS	Omaha, NE
G	45	Dalano Banton (redshirt)	6 ft 8 in (2.03 m)	195 lb (88 kg)	So	Western Kentucky	Toronto, ON, Canada

Head coach

- Fred Hoiberg (Iowa State)

Assistant coach(es)

- Armon Gates (Kent State)
- Matt Abdelmassih (St. John's)
- Doc Sadler (Arkansas)
- Bobby Lutz (Charlotte) (special asst. to HC)

Legend

- (C) Team captain
- (S) Suspended
- (I) Ineligible
- (W) Walk-on
- Injured
- Current redshirt

Roster

== Schedule and results ==
Date time, TV	Rank^{#}	Opponent^{#}	Result	Record	High points	High rebounds	High assists	Site (attendance) city, state
Foreign exhibition tour
August 5, 2019*; 11:30 am, PlaySight		at A.S. Stella Azzurra	W 87–56	0–0	15 – Green	– –	– –	Rome, Italy
August 7, 2019*; 1:00 pm		vs. BC Šilutė	W 83–58	0–0	20 – Burke/Cheatham	– –	– –	Ponte Buggianese, Italy
August 8, 2019*; 11:00 am		vs. BC Šilutė	W 73–70	0–0	13 – Curtis	– –	– –	Ponte Buggianese, Italy
August 12, 2019*; 12:00 pm		vs. Italian Select	W 84–62	0–0	15 – Easley	– –	– –	Costa Masnaga, Italy
Exhibition
October 30, 2019*; 7:00 pm, BTN Plus		Doane	W 91–63	0–0	15 – Burke	10 – Cross	8 – Mack	Pinnacle Bank Arena (15,695); Lincoln, NE
Regular season
November 5, 2019*; 8:00 pm, BTN		UC Riverside	L 47–66	0–1	11 – Mack	9 – Mack	3 – Tied	Pinnacle Bank Arena (15,745); Lincoln, NE
November 9, 2019*; 1:00 pm, BTN Plus		Southern Utah	L 78–79 ^{OT}	0–2	19 – Cross	8 – Green	11 – Mack	Pinnacle Bank Arena (15,828); Lincoln, NE
November 15, 2019*; 8:00 pm, BTN		South Dakota State	W 90–73	1–2	24 – Mack	12 – Ouedraogo	5 – Green	Pinnacle Bank Arena (15,946); Lincoln, NE
November 22, 2019*; 7:00 pm, BTN Plus		Southern	W 93–86 ^{OT}	2–2	22 – Green	7 – Cheatham	8 – Mack	Pinnacle Bank Arena (15,931); Lincoln, NE
November 25, 2019*; 6:30 pm, FloSports		vs. Washington State; Cayman Islands Classic quarterfinals	W 82–71	3–2	19 – Cheatham	8 – 3 tied	6 – Mack	John Gray Gymnasium (660); George Town, Cayman Islands
November 26, 2019*; 7:30 pm, FloSports		vs. George Mason; Cayman Islands Classic semifinals	L 66–85	3–3	14 – Burke	5 – Tied	5 – Green	John Gray Gymnasium (1,066); George Town, Cayman Islands
November 27, 2019*; 5:00 pm, FloSports		vs. South Florida; Cayman Islands Classic third place game	W 74–67	4–3	26 – Cheatham	5 – Ouedraogo	7 – Mack	John Gray Gymnasium (512); George Town, Cayman Islands
December 4, 2019*; 6:15 pm, ESPNU		at Georgia Tech; ACC–Big Ten Challenge	L 56–73	4–4	14 – Cheatham	11 – Cheatham	6 – Mack	McCamish Pavilion (5,133); Atlanta, GA
December 7, 2019*; 1:30 pm, FS1		at Creighton; Rivalry	L 76–95	4–5	14 – Cheatham	7 – Burke	3 – Mack	CHI Health Center Omaha (18,068); Omaha, NE
December 13, 2019; 7:00 pm, BTN		at Indiana	L 90–96 ^{OT}	4–6 (0–1)	25 – Burke	10 – Ouedraogo	10 – Mack	Simon Skjodt Assembly Hall (17,222); Bloomington, IN
December 15, 2019; 3:00 pm, BTN		Purdue	W 70–56	5–6 (1–1)	18 – Burke	10 – Mack	12 – Mack	Pinnacle Bank Arena (15,654); Lincoln, NE
December 21, 2019*; 5:00 pm, BTN Plus		North Dakota	L 74–75	5–7	19 – Mack	9 – Ouedraogo	7 – Mack	Pinnacle Bank Arena (15,010); Lincoln, NE
December 29, 2019*; 3:00 pm, BTN		Texas A&M–Corpus Christi	W 73–52	6–7	17 – Cheatham	14 – Ouedraogo	5 – Mack	Pinnacle Bank Arena (14,968); Lincoln, NE
January 3, 2020; 7:00 pm, BTN		Rutgers	L 62–79	6–8 (1–2)	16 – Cheatham	5 – Burke Jr.	6 – Mack	Pinnacle Bank Arena (15,024); Lincoln, NE
January 7, 2020; 8:00 pm, BTN		Iowa	W 76–70	7–8 (2–2)	17 – Thorbjarnarson	9 – Thorbjarnarson	10 – Mack	Pinnacle Bank Arena (14,722); Lincoln, NE
January 11, 2020; 3:30 pm, BTN		at Northwestern	L 57–62	7–9 (2–3)	11 – Mack	10 – Mack	7 – Mack	Welsh–Ryan Arena (5,664); Evanston, IL
January 14, 2020; 5:30 pm, FS1		at No. 21 Ohio State	L 68–80	7–10 (2–4)	15 – Thorbjarnarson	6 – Thorbjarnarson	6 – Mack	Value City Arena (12,954); Columbus, OH
January 18, 2020; 6:00 pm, BTN		Indiana	L 74–82	7–11 (2–5)	20 – Mack	9 – Thorbjarnarson	9 – Mack	Pinnacle Bank Arena (15,925); Lincoln, NE
January 21, 2020; 8:00 pm, BTN		at Wisconsin	L 68–82	7–12 (2–6)	20 – Burke Jr.	8 – Tied	6 – Mack	Kohl Center (16,856); Madison, WI
January 25, 2020; 1:00 pm, BTN		at No. 24 Rutgers	L 72–75	7–13 (2–7)	19 – Mack	8 – Thorbjarnarson	5 – Burke Jr.	Louis Brown Athletic Center (8,000); Piscataway, NJ
January 28, 2020; 6:00 pm, ESPNU		Michigan	L 68–79	7–14 (2–8)	19 – Mack	8 – Thorbjarnarson	9 – Mack	Pinnacle Bank Arena (15,868); Lincoln, NE
February 1, 2020; 6:00 pm, BTN		No. 24 Penn State	L 64–76	7–15 (2–9)	15 – Cheatham	8 – Cheatham	3 – Mack	Pinnacle Bank Arena (15,901); Lincoln, NE
February 8, 2020; 5:00 pm, BTN		at No. 17 Iowa	L 72–96	7–16 (2–10)	18 – Green	7 – Green	5 – Cross	Carver–Hawkeye Arena (15,056); Iowa City, IA
February 11, 2020; 7:30 pm, BTN		at No. 9 Maryland	L 70–72	7–17 (2–11)	20 – Cheatham	7 – Thorbjarnarson	8 – Mack	Xfinity Center (14,396); College Park, MD
February 15, 2020; 1:15 pm, BTN		Wisconsin	L 64–81	7–18 (2–12)	17 – Cheatham	10 – Ouedraogo	8 – Mack	Pinnacle Bank Arena (15,864); Lincoln, NE
February 20, 2020; 7:30 pm, FS1		Michigan State	L 65–86	7–19 (2–13)	21 – Burke Jr.	7 – Ouedraogo	6 – Mack	Pinnacle Bank Arena (15,838); Lincoln, NE
February 24, 2020; 7:00 pm, BTN		at Illinois	L 59–71	7–20 (2–14)	14 – Cheatham	10 – Ouedraogo	2 – Tied	State Farm Center (15,354); Champaign, IN
February 27, 2020; 8:00 pm, ESPN2		No. 23 Ohio State	L 54–75	7–21 (2–15)	13 – Burke Jr.	6 – Ouedraogo	3 – Tied	Pinnacle Bank Arena (15,611); Lincoln, NE
March 1, 2020; 3:15 pm, BTN		Northwestern	L 76–81	7–22 (2–16)	20 – Cheatham	19 – Ouedraogo	7 – Mack	Pinnacle Bank Arena (15,842); Lincoln, NE
March 5, 2020; 5:30 pm, FS1		at No. 25 Michigan	L 58–82	7–23 (2–17)	19 – Cheatham	7 – Thorbjarnarson	4 – Green	Crisler Center (12,707); Ann Arbor, MI
March 8, 2020; 12:00 pm, BTN		at Minnesota	L 75–107	7–24 (2–18)	17 – Cheatham	6 – Easley	4 – Cheatham	Williams Arena (9,984); Minneapolis, MN
Big Ten tournament
March 11, 2020; 7:30 pm, BTN	(14)	vs. (11) Indiana; First Round	L 64–89	7–25	17 – Cheatham	9 – Cross	4 – Green	Bankers Life Fieldhouse (17,923); Indianapolis, IN
*Non-conference game. ^{#}Rankings from AP Poll. (#) Tournament seedings in parentheses. All times are in Central Time.

Schedule source:
