= 2019–20 Purdue Boilermakers men's basketball team =

American college basketball season

2019–20 Purdue Boilermakers men's basketball
- Conference: Big Ten Conference
- Record: 16–15 (9–11 Big Ten)
- Head coach: Matt Painter (15th season)
- Assistant coaches: Brandon Brantley (7th season); Steve Lutz (3rd season); Micah Shrewsberry (1st season)
- Home arena: Mackey Arena

2019–20 Big Ten Conference men's basketball standings
	Conf.				Overall
Team	W		L	PCT	W		L	PCT
No. 17 Wisconsin	14	–	6	.700	21	–	10	.677
No. 9 Michigan State	14	–	6	.700	22	–	9	.710
No. 12 Maryland	14	–	6	.700	24	–	7	.774
No. 21 Illinois	13	–	7	.650	21	–	10	.677
No. 25 Iowa	11	–	9	.550	20	–	11	.645
Penn State	11	–	9	.550	21	–	10	.677
No. 19 Ohio State	11	–	9	.550	21	–	10	.677
Rutgers	11	–	9	.550	20	–	11	.645
Michigan	10	–	10	.500	19	–	12	.613
Purdue	9	–	11	.450	16	–	15	.516
Indiana	9	–	11	.450	20	–	12	.625
Minnesota	8	–	12	.400	15	–	16	.484
Northwestern	3	–	17	.150	8	–	23	.258
Nebraska	2	–	18	.100	7	–	25	.219
The 2020 Big Ten tournament was canceled prior to the second round due to the COVID-19 pandemic. Rankings from AP poll

The 2019–20 Purdue Boilermakers men's basketball team represented Purdue University in the 2019–20 NCAA Division I men's basketball season. Their head coach was Matt Painter in his 15th season with the Boilers. The team played their home games at Mackey Arena in West Lafayette, Indiana as members of the Big Ten Conference. The Boilers finished the season 16–15, 9–11 in Big Ten play to finish in a tie for 10th place. Due to tie-breaking rules, they received the No. 10 seed in the Big Ten tournament before the tournament was canceled due to the coronavirus pandemic.

== Previous season ==
The Boilermakers finished the 2018–19 season 26–10, 16–4 in Big Ten play to win a share of the Big Ten regular season championship, the school's conference-record 24th championship. As the No. 2 seed in the Big Ten tournament, they were upset by Minnesota in the quarterfinals. The received an at-large bid to the NCAA tournament as the No. 3 seed in the South region. They defeated Old Dominion in the First Round before beating defending champion Villanova to advance to the Sweet Sixteen. In the Sweet Sixteen, they defeated Tennessee in overtime to advance to the Elite Eight. There they lost to No. 1 seed Virginia in overtime.

== Offseason ==
=== Coaching changes ===
In March 2019, assistant Greg Gary was hired as the new head coach at Mercer. As a result, Painter hired Micah Shrewsberry to return as associate head coach in May 2019.

=== Departures ===
Name	Number	Pos.	Height	Weight	Year	Hometown	Reason for departure
Ryan Cline	14	G	6'6"	195	SR	Carmel, Indiana	Graduated
Carsen Edwards	3	G	6'1"	200	JR	Atascocita, Texas	NBA
Grady Eifert	24	F	6"6"	220	SR	Fort Wayne, Indiana	Graduated
Kyle King	24	F	6'6"	215	FR	St. Charles, Illinois	Walk-on; left team for personal reasons

=== Incoming transfers ===
Name	Number	Pos.	Height	Weight	Year	Hometown	Previous school
Jahaad Proctor	3	G	6'3"	215	RS Senior	Harrisburg, PA	High Point
Jared Wulbrun	14	G	5'11"	185	Sophomore	Stanford, CA	Cal Lutheran

=== 2019 recruiting class ===
College recruiting information
Name	Hometown	School	Height	Weight	Commit date
Isaiah Thompson; PG	Zionsville, IN	Zionsville Community High School	6 ft 0 in (1.83 m)	165 lb (75 kg)	Jan 7, 2018
Isaiah Thompson; PG	Recruit ratings: Scout: Rivals: 247Sports: ESPN:				
Mason Gillis; PF	New Castle, IN	New Castle High School	6 ft 6 in (1.98 m)	215 lb (98 kg)	Jun 24, 2018
Mason Gillis; PF	Recruit ratings: Scout: Rivals: 247Sports: ESPN:				
Brandon Newman; SG	Valparaiso, IN	Valparaiso High School	6 ft 4 in (1.93 m)	175 lb (79 kg)	Sep 19, 2018
Brandon Newman; SG	Recruit ratings: Scout: Rivals: 247Sports: ESPN:				
Overall recruit ranking:
Note: In many cases, Scout, Rivals, 247Sports, On3, and ESPN may conflict in their listings of height and weight.; In these cases, the average was taken. ESPN grades are on a 100-point scale.; Sources: "2019 Purdue Commits". Rivals.; "2019 Team Ranking". Rivals.

=== 2020 recruiting class ===
College recruiting information (2020)
Name	Hometown	School	Height	Weight	Commit date
Ethan Morton; SG	Butler, PA	Butler Senior High School	6 ft 4 in (1.93 m)	215 lb (98 kg)	May 9, 2019
Ethan Morton; SG	Recruit ratings: Scout: Rivals: 247Sports: ESPN:				
Jaden Ivey; SG	Mishawaka, IN	Marian High School	6 ft 3 in (1.91 m)	180 lb (82 kg)	Apr 24, 2019
Jaden Ivey; SG	Recruit ratings: Scout: Rivals: 247Sports: ESPN:				
Overall recruit ranking:
Note: In many cases, Scout, Rivals, 247Sports, On3, and ESPN may conflict in their listings of height and weight.; In these cases, the average was taken. ESPN grades are on a 100-point scale.; Sources: "2020 Purdue Commits". Rivals.; "2020 Team Ranking". Rivals.

== Roster ==
2019–20 Purdue Boilermakers men's basketball team
Players
Coaches

Pos.	#	Name	Height	Weight	Year	Previous school	Hometown
F	0	Mason Gillis (injured) (redshirt)	6 ft 7 in (2.01 m)	205 lb (93 kg)	Fr	New Castle High School	New Castle, Indiana
F	1	Aaron Wheeler	6 ft 9 in (2.06 m)	200 lb (91 kg)	RS So	Brewster Academy	Stamford, Connecticut
G	2	Eric Hunter Jr.	6 ft 4 in (1.93 m)	175 lb (79 kg)	So	Tindley Prep	Indianapolis, Indiana
G	3	Jahaad Proctor	6 ft 3 in (1.91 m)	205 lb (93 kg)	RS Sr	High Point	Harrisburg, Pennsylvania
C	4	Emmanuel Dowuona	6 ft 10 in (2.08 m)	230 lb (104 kg)	RS Fr	Westwood Christian School	Miami, Florida
G	5	Brandon Newman (injured) (redshirt)	6 ft 5 in (1.96 m)	190 lb (86 kg)	Fr	Valparaiso High School	Valparaiso, Indiana
G	11	Isaiah Thompson	6 ft 1 in (1.85 m)	165 lb (75 kg)	Fr	Zionsville High School	Zionsville, Indiana
F	12	Evan Boudreaux	6 ft 8 in (2.03 m)	220 lb (100 kg)	RS Sr	Dartmouth	Lake Forest, Illinois
G	14	Jared Wulbrun (W)	5 ft 11 in (1.8 m)	185 lb (84 kg)	So	Cal Lutheran	Stanford, California
G	15	Tommy Luce	5 ft 10 in (1.78 m)	155 lb (70 kg)	Sr	Jeffersonville High School	Jeffersonville, Indiana
G	20	Nojel Eastern	6 ft 6 in (1.98 m)	220 lb (100 kg)	Jr	Evanston Township High School	Evanston, Illinois
F	21	Matt Frost (W)	6 ft 5 in (1.96 m)	200 lb (91 kg)	Fr	Columbus East High School	Columbus, Indiana
F	32	Matt Haarms	7 ft 3 in (2.21 m)	250 lb (113 kg)	RS Jr	Sunrise Christian Academy	Amsterdam, the Netherlands
F	50	Trevion Williams	6 ft 9 in (2.06 m)	280 lb (127 kg)	So	Henry Ford Academy	Chicago, Illinois
G	55	Sasha Stefanovic	6 ft 4 in (1.93 m)	195 lb (88 kg)	RS So	Crown Point High School	Crown Point, Indiana

Head coach

- Matt Painter (Purdue)

Assistant coach(es)

- Micah Shrewsberry (Hanover)
- Steve Lutz (Texas Lutheran)
- Brandon Brantley (Purdue)

Legend

- (C) Team captain
- (S) Suspended
- (I) Ineligible
- (W) Walk-on
- Injured
- Current redshirt

Roster
Last update: December 9, 2019

== Schedule and results ==
Date time, TV	Rank^{#}	Opponent^{#}	Result	Record	High points	High rebounds	High assists	Site (attendance) city, state
Exhibition
November 1, 2019*; 8:00 p.m., BTN Plus	No. 23	Southern Indiana	W 88–59	–	17 – Wheeler	6 – Tied	4 – Tied	Mackey Arena (14,804); West Lafayette, IN
Regular season
November 6, 2019*; 7:00 p.m., BTN	No. 23	Green Bay	W 79–57	1–0	26 – Proctor	9 – Wheeler	6 – Hunter	Mackey Arena (14,804); West Lafayette, IN
November 9, 2019*; 7:00 p.m., FS1	No. 23	Texas	L 66–70	1–1	14 – Stefanovic	8 – Williams	6 – Eastern	Mackey Arena (14,804); West Lafayette, IN
November 13, 2019*; 9:00 p.m., FS1		at Marquette; Gavitt Tipoff Games	L 55–65	1–2	14 – Haarms	8 – Haarms	5 – Wheeler	Fiserv Forum (17,500); Milwaukee, WI
November 16, 2019*; 2:00 p.m., BTN Plus		Chicago State; Emerald Coast Classic campus game	W 93–49	2–2	17 – Thompson	10 – Wheeler	5 – Hunter	Mackey Arena (14,804); West Lafayette, IN
November 23, 2019*; 8:00 pm, BTN		Jacksonville State; Emerald Coast Classic campus game	W 81–49	3–2	17 – Haarms	10 – Haarms	5 – Thompson	Mackey Arena (14,804); West Lafayette, IN
November 29, 2019*; 9:30 pm, CBSSN		vs. No. 20 VCU; Emerald Coast Classic Semifinals	W 59–56	4–2	12 – Tied	7 – Williams	4 – Eastern	The Arena at NFSC (2,500); Niceville, FL
November 30, 2019*; 7:00 pm, CBSSN		vs. Florida State; Emerald Coast Classic Championship	L 60–63 ^{OT}	4–3	16 – Haarms	8 – Tied	4 – Hunter Jr.	The Arena at NFSC (2,500); Niceville, FL
December 4, 2019*; 7:15 p.m., ESPN2		No. 5 Virginia; ACC–Big Ten Challenge	W 69–40	5–3	20 – Stefanovic	7 – Willams	4 – Hunter Jr.	Mackey Arena (14,804); West Lafayette, IN
December 8, 2019; 5:00 p.m., BTN		Northwestern	W 58–44	6–3 (1–0)	14 – Stefanovic	7 – Tied	3 – Tied	Mackey Arena (14,804); West Lafayette, IN
December 15, 2019; 4:00 p.m., BTN		at Nebraska	L 56–70	6–4 (1–1)	18 – Williams	16 – Williams	3 – Williams	Pinnacle Bank Arena (15,654); Lincoln, NE
December 17, 2019*; 9:00 p.m., ESPN2		at Ohio	W 69–51	7–4	18 – Hunter	6 – 2 tied	4 – Proctor	Convocation Center (5,663); Athens, OH
December 21, 2019*; 2:30 p.m., BTN		vs. No. 17 Butler; Crossroads Classic	L 61–70	7–5	12 – Williams	10 – Williams	3 – Tied	Bankers Life Fieldhouse (18,538); Indianapolis, IN
December 28, 2019*; 12:00 p.m., BTN		Central Michigan	W 97–62	8–5	23 – Stefanovic	12 – Williams	6 – Hunter	Mackey Arena (14,804); West Lafayette, IN
January 2, 2020; 7:00 p.m., BTN		Minnesota	W 83–78 ^{2OT}	9–5 (2–1)	26 – Haarms	9 – Tied	5 – Tied	Mackey Arena (14,804); West Lafayette, IN
January 5, 2020; 8:00 p.m., FS1		at Illinois	L 37–63	9–6 (2–2)	8 – Stefanovic	7 – Williams	3 – Eastern	State Farm Center (12,153); Champaign, IL
January 9, 2020; 7:00 p.m., FS1		at No. 19 Michigan	L 78–84 ^{2OT}	9–7 (2–3)	36 – Williams	20 – Williams	2 – Tied	Crisler Center (12,707); Ann Arbor, MI
January 12, 2020; 12:00 p.m., CBS		No. 8 Michigan State	W 71–42	10–7 (3–3)	16 – Williams	7 – Tied	4 – Tied	Mackey Arena (14,804); West Lafayette, IN
January 18, 2020; 2:00 p.m., ESPN2		at No. 17 Maryland	L 50–57	10–8 (3–4)	14 – Eastern	8 – Stefanovic	3 – Stefanovic	Xfinity Center (16,099); College Park, MD
January 21, 2020; 7:00 p.m., ESPNU		No. 21 Illinois	L 62–79	10–9 (3–5)	14 – Eastern	6 – Haarms	2 – Eastern	Mackey Arena (14,804); West Lafayette, IN
January 24, 2020; 7:00 p.m., FS1		Wisconsin	W 70–51	11–9 (4–5)	14 – Thompson	13 – Boudreaux	6 – Hunter Jr.	Mackey Arena (14,804); West Lafayette, IN
January 28, 2020; 8:00 p.m., BTN		at No. 25 Rutgers	L 63–70	11–10 (4–6)	19 – Proctor	13 – Williams	4 – Proctor	Louis Brown Athletic Center (8,000); Piscataway, NJ
February 1, 2020; 9:00 p.m., BTN		at Northwestern	W 61–58	12–10 (5–6)	13 – Tied	7 – Williams	4 – Eastern	Welsh–Ryan Arena (5,874); Evanston, IL
February 5, 2020; 7:00 p.m., BTN		No. 17 Iowa	W 104–68	13–10 (6–6)	18 – Boudreaux	8 – Boudreaux	7 – Hunter Jr.	Mackey Arena (14,804); West Lafayette, IN
February 8, 2020; 2:00 p.m., ESPN		at Indiana; Rivalry/Indiana National Guard Governor's Cup	W 74–62	14–10 (7–6)	12 – Hunter	5 – Hunter	5 – Eastern	Simon Skjodt Assembly Hall (17,222); Bloomington, IN
February 11, 2020; 6:30 p.m., BTN		No. 13 Penn State	L 76–88	14–11 (7–7)	17 – Williams	10 – Williams	4 – Proctor	Mackey Arena (14,804); West Lafayette, IN
February 15, 2020; 12:00 p.m., FOX		at Ohio State	L 52–68	14–12 (7–8)	17 – Boudreaux	8 – Williams	3 – Williams	Value City Arena (18,809); Columbus, OH
February 18, 2020; 7:00 p.m., ESPN		at Wisconsin	L 65–69	14–13 (7–9)	17 – Williams	11 – Williams	4 – Eastern	Kohl Center (17,042); Madison, WI
February 22, 2020; 2:00 p.m., ESPN		Michigan	L 63–71	14–14 (7–10)	18 – Williams	15 – Boudreaux	2 – Tied	Mackey Arena (14,804); West Lafayette, IN
February 27, 2020; 7:00 p.m., FS1		Indiana; Rivalry/Indiana National Guard Governor's Cup	W 57–49	15–14 (8–10)	19 – Williams	8 – Williams	2 – Tied	Mackey Arena (14,804); West Lafayette, IN
March 3, 2020; 9:00 p.m., BTN		at No. 18 Iowa	W 77–68	16–14 (9–10)	19 – Hunter	14 – Boudreaux	6 – Eastern	Carver–Hawkeye Arena (13,216); Iowa City, IA
March 7, 2020; 2:00 p.m., BTN		Rutgers	L 68–71 ^{OT}	16–15 (9–11)	22 – Stefanovic	10 – Boudreaux	5 – Stefanovic	Mackey Arena (14,804); West Lafayette, IN
Big Ten tournament
Canceled
*Non-conference game. ^{#}Rankings from AP Poll. (#) Tournament seedings in parentheses. All times are in Eastern Time.

== Rankings ==
Ranking movements Legend: ██ Increase in ranking ██ Decrease in ranking — = Not ranked RV = Received votes
	Week																				
Poll	Pre	1	2	3	4	5	6	7	8	9	10	11	12	13	14	15	16	17	18	19	Final
AP	23	RV	RV	RV	RV	RV	RV	RV	RV	RV	RV	RV	RV	RV	—	RV	—	—	—	RV	Not released
Coaches	22	22^	RV	RV	RV	RV	RV	RV	RV	RV	RV	RV	—	—	—	RV	—	—	—	—	

*AP does not release post-NCAA Tournament rankings
^Coaches did not release a week 2 poll
