= 2019–20 Minnesota Golden Gophers men's basketball team =

American college basketball season

2019–20 Minnesota Golden Gophers men's basketball
- Conference: Big Ten Conference
- Record: 15–16 (8–12 Big Ten)
- Head coach: Richard Pitino (7th season)
- Assistant coaches: Ed Conroy (4th season); Rob Jeter (2nd season); Kyle Lindsted (2nd season)
- Home arena: Williams Arena

2019–20 Big Ten Conference men's basketball standings
	Conf.				Overall
Team	W		L	PCT	W		L	PCT
No. 17 Wisconsin	14	–	6	.700	21	–	10	.677
No. 9 Michigan State	14	–	6	.700	22	–	9	.710
No. 12 Maryland	14	–	6	.700	24	–	7	.774
No. 21 Illinois	13	–	7	.650	21	–	10	.677
No. 25 Iowa	11	–	9	.550	20	–	11	.645
Penn State	11	–	9	.550	21	–	10	.677
No. 19 Ohio State	11	–	9	.550	21	–	10	.677
Rutgers	11	–	9	.550	20	–	11	.645
Michigan	10	–	10	.500	19	–	12	.613
Purdue	9	–	11	.450	16	–	15	.516
Indiana	9	–	11	.450	20	–	12	.625
Minnesota	8	–	12	.400	15	–	16	.484
Northwestern	3	–	17	.150	8	–	23	.258
Nebraska	2	–	18	.100	7	–	25	.219
The 2020 Big Ten tournament was canceled prior to the second round due to the COVID-19 pandemic. Rankings from AP poll

The 2019–20 Minnesota Golden Gophers men's basketball team represented the University of Minnesota in the 2019–20 NCAA Division I men's basketball season. The Gophers were led by seventh-year head coach Richard Pitino and played their home games at Williams Arena in Minneapolis, Minnesota as members of the Big Ten Conference. They finished the season 15–16, 8–12 in Big Ten play to finish in 12th place. The Gophers defeated Northwestern in the first round of the Big Ten tournament before the tournament was canceled due to the ongoing COVID-19 pandemic. All other postseason tournaments including the NCAA tournament were later canceled effectively ending the season.

== Previous season ==
The Golden Gophers finished the 2018–19 season 22–14, 9–11 in Big Ten play to finish in seventh place. As the No. 7 seed in the Big Ten tournament, they defeated Penn State in the second round. In the quarterfinals, they defeated Purdue for the second time on the season. In the semifinals, they lost to Michigan. The Gophers received a bid to the NCAA tournament as the No. 10 seed in the East Region. There, they defeated seventh-seeded Louisville in the first round before losing to Michigan State in the second round.

== Offseason ==
=== Departures ===
Name	Number	Pos.	Height	Weight	Year	Hometown	Reason for departure
Dupree McBrayer	1	G	6'5"	195	Senior	Queens, NY	Graduated
Jordan Murphy	3	F	6'7"	250	Senior	San Antonio, TX	Graduated
Amir Coffey	5	G	6'8"	205	Junior	Hopkins, MN	Declared for NBA Draft
Isaiah Washington	11	G	6'1"	195	Sophomore	Harlem, NY	Transferred to Iona
Jarvis Johnson	12	G	6'1"	185	Senior	Minneapolis, MN	Graduated
Brock Stull	31	G	6'4"	210	RS Senior	Rockford, IL	Graduated
Matz Stockman	35	C	7'0"	245	RS Senior	Oslo, Norway	Graduated

=== Incoming transfers ===
Name	Pos.	Height	Weight	Year	Hometown	Previous School
Alihan Demir	F	6'9"	232	Senior	Ankara, Turkey	Drexel

=== Recruiting class ===
==== 2019 recruiting class ====
College recruiting information
Name	Hometown	School	Height	Weight	Commit date
Sam Freeman; C	Justin, TX	Northwest High School	6 ft 9 in (2.06 m)	223 lb (101 kg)	Apr 4, 2019
Sam Freeman; C	Recruit ratings: Rivals: 247Sports: ESPN:				
Bryan Greenlee; PG	Gainesville, FL	The Rock School	6 ft 2 in (1.88 m)	175 lb (79 kg)	Jun 13, 2019
Bryan Greenlee; PG	Recruit ratings: Rivals: 247Sports: ESPN:				
Isaiah Ihnen; SF	Böblingen, Germany	N/A	6 ft 9 in (2.06 m)	195 lb (88 kg)	Apr 23, 2019
Isaiah Ihnen; SF	Recruit ratings: Rivals: 247Sports: ESPN:				
Tre Williams; SG	Mount Pleasant, UT	Wasatch Academy	6 ft 4 in (1.93 m)	180 lb (82 kg)	Nov 13, 2018
Tre Williams; SG	Recruit ratings: Rivals: 247Sports: ESPN:				
Overall recruit ranking:
Note: In many cases, Scout, Rivals, 247Sports, On3, and ESPN may conflict in their listings of height and weight.; In these cases, the average was taken. ESPN grades are on a 100-point scale.; Sources: "2019 Minnesota Commits". Rivals.; "2019 Team Ranking". Rivals.

== Future recruits ==
=== 2020–21 team recruits ===
College recruiting information
Name	Hometown	School	Height	Weight	Commit date
Martice Mitchell; PF	Chicago Heights, Illinois	Bloom High School	6 ft 10 in (2.08 m)	190 lb (86 kg)	Oct 7, 2019
Martice Mitchell; PF	Recruit ratings: Scout: Rivals: 247Sports: ESPN: (79)				
Jamal Mashburn Jr. CG	Miami, Florida	Brewster Academy	6 ft 0 in (1.83 m)	160 lb (73 kg)	Oct 14, 2019
Jamal Mashburn Jr. CG	Recruit ratings: Scout: Rivals: 247Sports: ESPN: (80)				
Overall recruit ranking:
Note: In many cases, Scout, Rivals, 247Sports, On3, and ESPN may conflict in their listings of height and weight.; In these cases, the average was taken. ESPN grades are on a 100-point scale.; Sources: "2020 Team Ranking". Rivals.

=== 2021–22 team recruits ===
College recruiting information (2021)
Name	Hometown	School	Height	Weight	Commit date
Treyton Thompson; PF	Alexandria, Minnesota	La Lumiere School	6 ft 11 in (2.11 m)	190 lb (86 kg)	Nov 30, 2019
Treyton Thompson; PF	Recruit ratings: Rivals: 247Sports:				
Overall recruit ranking:
Note: In many cases, Scout, Rivals, 247Sports, On3, and ESPN may conflict in their listings of height and weight.; In these cases, the average was taken. ESPN grades are on a 100-point scale.; Sources: "2021 Team Ranking". Rivals.

== Roster ==
2019–20 Minnesota Golden Gophers men's basketball team
Players
Coaches

Pos.	#	Name	Height	Weight	Year	Previous school	Hometown
G	0	Payton Willis	6 ft 4 in (1.93 m)	200 lb (91 kg)	RS Jr	Fayetteville; Vanderbilt	Fayetteville, AR
G	1	Tre' Williams	6 ft 5 in (1.96 m)	195 lb (88 kg)	Fr	Wasatch Academy	Dallas, TX
G	3	Bryan Greenlee	6 ft 0 in (1.83 m)	190 lb (86 kg)	Fr	The Rock School	Gainesville, FL
G	5	Marcus Carr (C)	6 ft 2 in (1.88 m)	195 lb (88 kg)	RS So	Montverde Academy; Pittsburgh	Toronto, ON
G	10	Brady Rudrud (W)	6 ft 2 in (1.88 m)	190 lb (86 kg)	Sr	Eden Prairie	Eden Prairie, MN
G	13	Hunt Conroy (W)	5 ft 10 in (1.78 m)	165 lb (75 kg)	Jr	Jesuit	New Orleans, LA
F	21	Jarvis Omersa	6 ft 6 in (1.98 m)	235 lb (107 kg)	So	Orono	Orono, MN
G	22	Gabe Kalscheur	6 ft 4 in (1.93 m)	200 lb (91 kg)	So	DeLaSalle	Edina, MN
F	24	Eric Curry (injured)	6 ft 9 in (2.06 m)	240 lb (109 kg)	RS Jr	Southwest Christian Academy	Memphis, TN
C	25	Daniel Oturu	6 ft 10 in (2.08 m)	240 lb (109 kg)	So	Cretin-Derham Hall	Woodbury, MN
F	30	Alihan Demir	6 ft 9 in (2.06 m)	235 lb (107 kg)	Sr	Ari College; Drexel	Ankara, Turkey
C	32	Sam Freeman	6 ft 10 in (2.08 m)	240 lb (109 kg)	Fr	Northwest	Dallas, TX
F	35	Isaiah Ihnen	6 ft 9 in (2.06 m)	210 lb (95 kg)	Fr	IBA Munich	Böblingen, Germany
F	42	Michael Hurt (C)	6 ft 7 in (2.01 m)	220 lb (100 kg)	Sr	John Marshall	Rochester, MN

Head coach

- Richard Pitino (Providence)

Assistant coach(es)

- Ed Conroy (The Citadel)
- Rob Jeter (UW–Platteville)
- Kyle Lindsted (Central Christian (KS))

Legend

- (C) Team captain
- (S) Suspended
- (I) Ineligible
- (W) Walk-on
- Injured
- Current redshirt

Roster

== Schedule and results ==
Date time, TV	Rank^{#}	Opponent^{#}	Result	Record	High points	High rebounds	High assists	Site (attendance) city, state
Exhibition
Oct 28, 2019*; 7:00 pm, BTN Plus		Southwest Minnesota State	W 73–48		14 – Willis	16 – Oturu	6 – Tied	Williams Arena (7,387); Minneapolis, MN
Regular season
Nov 5, 2019*; 7:00 pm, BTN Plus		Cleveland State	W 85–50	1–0	18 – Carr	10 – Oturu	8 – Tied	Williams Arena (8,693); Minneapolis, MN
Nov 9, 2019*; 7:00 pm, BTN		vs. Oklahoma; Sioux Falls Showcase	L 62–71	1–1	16 – Carr	10 – Carr	6 – Carr	Sanford Pentagon (3,445); Sioux Falls, SD
Nov 12, 2019*; 7:30 pm, FS1		at Butler; Gavitt Tipoff Games	L 56–64	1–2	24 – Oturu	10 – Oturu	7 – Carr	Hinkle Fieldhouse (7,879); Indianapolis, IN
Nov 15, 2019*; 8:00 p.m., P12N		at Utah	L 69–73	1–3	21 – Oturu	18 – Oturu	6 – Carr	Jon M. Huntsman Center (12,760); Salt Lake City, UT
Nov 21, 2019*; 7:00 pm, BTN Plus		Central Michigan	W 82-57	2–3	19 – Carr	12 – Oturu	7 – Carr	Williams Arena (8,566); Minneapolis, MN
Nov 24, 2019*; 6:00 pm, BTN		North Dakota	W 79–56	3–3	18 – Kalscheur	9 – Omersa	6 – Carr	Williams Arena (8,854); Minneapolis, MN
Nov 29, 2019*; 2:00 pm, FS1		DePaul	L 68–73	3–4	19 – Oturu	18 – Oturu	4 – Carr	Williams Arena (10,260); Minneapolis, MN
Dec 2, 2019*; 8:00 p.m., ESPN2		Clemson; ACC–Big Ten Challenge	W 78–60	4–4	24 – Carr	6 – Demir	9 – Carr	Williams Arena (10,148); Minneapolis, MN
Dec 9, 2019; 7:00 pm, BTN		at Iowa	L 52–72	4–5 (0–1)	22 – Oturu	12 – Oturu	7 – Carr	Carver–Hawkeye Arena (10,442); Iowa City, IA
Dec 15, 2019; 5:30 pm, BTN		No. 3 Ohio State	W 84–71	5–5 (1–1)	35 – Carr	13 – Oturu	7 – Carr	Williams Arena (9,854); Minneapolis, MN
Dec 21, 2019*; 4:30 pm, ESPN2		vs. Oklahoma State; BOK Center Basketball Showdown	W 86–66	6–5	34 – Kalscheur	8 – Oturu	8 – Carr	BOK Center (4,979); Tulsa, OK
Dec 28, 2019*; 3:00 pm, BTN		FIU	W 89–62	7–5	23 – Kalscheur	20 – Oturu	8 – Carr	Williams Arena (10,546); Minneapolis, MN
Jan 2, 2020; 6:00 pm, BTN		at Purdue	L 78–83 ^{2OT}	7–6 (1–2)	29 – Oturu	18 – Oturu	4 – Carr	Mackey Arena (14,804); West Lafayette, IN
Jan 5, 2020; 6:30 pm, BTN		Northwestern	W 77–68	8–6 (2–2)	19 – Oturu	16 – Oturu	7 – Carr	Williams Arena (9,574); Minneapolis, MN
Jan 9, 2020; 8:00 pm, ESPN2		at No. 8 Michigan State	L 58–74	8–7 (2–3)	22 – Oturu	10 – Oturu	6 – Carr	Breslin Center (14,797); East Lansing, MI
Jan 12, 2020; 12:00 pm, BTN		No. 19 Michigan	W 75–67	9–7 (3–3)	30 – Oturu	7 – Oturu	12 – Carr	Williams Arena (10,453); Minneapolis, MN
Jan 15, 2020; 8:00 pm, BTN		Penn State	W 75–69	10–7 (4–3)	27 – Carr	14 – Oturu	9 – Carr	Williams Arena (9,714); Minneapolis, MN
Jan 19, 2020; 12:00 pm, BTN		at Rutgers	L 56–64	10–8 (5–4)	19 – Oturu	9 – Oturu	5 – Carr	Louis Brown Athletic Center (8,000); Piscataway, NJ
Jan 23, 2020; 5:30 pm, FS1		at Ohio State	W 62–59	11–8 (5–4)	21 – Carr	7 – Carr	2 – Tied	Value City Arena (13,234); Columbus, OH
Jan 26, 2020; 2:00 pm, FOX		No. 11 Michigan State	L 52–70	11–9 (5–5)	19 – Oturu	7 – Tied	6 – Carr	Williams Arena (12,114); Minneapolis, MN
Jan 30, 2020; 6:30 pm, FS1		at No. 19 Illinois	L 51–59	11–10 (5–6)	20 – Oturu	9 – Carr	2 – Carr	State Farm Center (15,544); Champaign, IL
Feb 5, 2020; 8:00 pm, BTN		Wisconsin	W 70–52	12–10 (6–6)	21 – Willis	14 – Oturu	10 – Carr	Williams Arena (11,389); Minneapolis, MN
Feb 8, 2020; 3:00 pm, BTN		at No. 22 Penn State	L 66–73	12–11 (6–7)	32 – Oturu	16 – Oturu	5 – Carr	Bryce Jordan Center (15,261); University Park, PA
Feb 16, 2020; 12:00 pm, FS1		No. 21 Iowa	L 55–58	12–12 (6–8)	15 – Oturu	9 – Demir	6 – Carr	Williams Arena (14,625); Minneapolis, MN
Feb 19, 2020; 8:00 pm, BTN		Indiana	L 56–68	12–13 (6–9)	12 – Tied	14 – Oturu	7 – Carr	Williams Arena (9,686); Minneapolis, MN
Feb 23, 2020; 2:00 pm, BTN		at Northwestern	W 83–57	13–13 (7–9)	22 – Oturu	12 – Oturu	7 – Carr	Welsh-Ryan Arena (5,815); Evanston, IL
Feb 26, 2020; 8:00 pm, BTN		No. 9 Maryland	L 73–74	13–14 (7–10)	28 – Oturu	11 – Oturu	7 – Carr	Williams Arena (9,252); Minneapolis, MN
Mar 1, 2020; 5:30 pm, BTN		at Wisconsin	L 69–71	13–15 (7–11)	26 – Oturu	12 – Oturu	4 – Carr	Kohl Center (17,287); Madison, WI
Mar 4, 2020; 6:00 pm, BTN		at Indiana	L 67–72	13–16 (7–12)	24 – Oturu	16 – Oturu	5 – Carr	Simon Skjodt Assembly Hall (17,222); Bloomington, IN
Mar 8, 2020; 12:00 pm, BTN		Nebraska	W 107–75	14–16 (8–12)	26 – Kalscheur	10 – Demir	11 – Carr	Williams Arena (9,984); Minneapolis, MN
Big Ten tournament
Mar 11, 2020; 6:00 pm, BTN	(12)	vs. (13) Northwestern; First Round	W 74–57	15–16	24 – Oturu	8 – Tied	5 – Carr	Bankers Life Fieldhouse; Indianapolis, IN
Remaining Games Canceled
*Non-conference game. ^{#}Rankings from AP Poll. (#) Tournament seedings in parentheses. All times are in Central Time.
