= 2019–20 Penn State Nittany Lions basketball team =

American college basketball season

2019–20 Penn State Nittany Lions basketball
- Conference: Big Ten Conference
- Record: 21–10 (11–9 Big Ten)
- Head coach: Pat Chambers (9th season)
- Associate head coach: Keith Urgo
- Assistant coaches: Jim Ferry; Kevin Freeman
- Home arena: Bryce Jordan Center

2019–20 Big Ten Conference men's basketball standings
	Conf.				Overall
Team	W		L	PCT	W		L	PCT
No. 17 Wisconsin	14	–	6	.700	21	–	10	.677
No. 9 Michigan State	14	–	6	.700	22	–	9	.710
No. 12 Maryland	14	–	6	.700	24	–	7	.774
No. 21 Illinois	13	–	7	.650	21	–	10	.677
No. 25 Iowa	11	–	9	.550	20	–	11	.645
Penn State	11	–	9	.550	21	–	10	.677
No. 19 Ohio State	11	–	9	.550	21	–	10	.677
Rutgers	11	–	9	.550	20	–	11	.645
Michigan	10	–	10	.500	19	–	12	.613
Purdue	9	–	11	.450	16	–	15	.516
Indiana	9	–	11	.450	20	–	12	.625
Minnesota	8	–	12	.400	15	–	16	.484
Northwestern	3	–	17	.150	8	–	23	.258
Nebraska	2	–	18	.100	7	–	25	.219
The 2020 Big Ten tournament was canceled prior to the second round due to the COVID-19 pandemic. Rankings from AP poll

The 2019–20 Penn State Nittany Lions basketball team represented Pennsylvania State University in the 2019–20 NCAA Division I men's basketball season. They were led by head coach Pat Chambers, in his ninth season with the team, and played their home games at the Bryce Jordan Center in University Park, Pennsylvania as members of the Big Ten Conference. They finished the season 21–10, 11–9 in Big Ten play to finish in a four-way tie for fifth place. Their season ended following the cancellation of postseason tournaments due to the coronavirus pandemic.

== Previous season ==
The Nittany Lions finished the 2018–19 season 14–18, 7–13 in Big Ten play to finish in a three-way tie for 10th place. They lost to Minnesota in the second round of the Big Ten tournament.

== Offseason ==
=== Departures ===
Name	Number	Pos.	Height	Weight	Year	Hometown	Reason for departure
Deividas Zemgulis	1	F	6'6"	220	Senior	Kaunas, Lithuania	Graduated
Satchel Pierce	3	F/C	7'0"	255	RS Senior	Barberton, OH	Graduated
Daniil Kasatkin	4	G	6'7"	205	Freshman	Vichuga, Russia	Pursue to play professional basketball
Rasir Bolton	13	G	6'2"	175	Freshman	Petersburg, VA	Transferred to Iowa State
Josh Reaves	23	G	6'4"	210	Senior	Fairfax, VA	Graduated

=== Incoming transfers ===
Name	Number	Pos.	Height	Weight	Year	Hometown	Previous School
Curtis Jones	4	G	6'4"	185	Senior	Richmond, VA	Oklahoma State

=== Recruiting classes ===
==== 2019 recruiting class ====
College recruiting information
Name	Hometown	School	Height	Weight	Commit date
Seth Lundy; SF	Philadelphia, PA	Roman Catholic High School	6 ft 5 in (1.96 m)	200 lb (91 kg)	Oct 5, 2018
Seth Lundy; SF	Recruit ratings: Scout: Rivals: 247Sports: ESPN:				
Abdou Tsimbila; C	Hagerstown, MD	St Maria Goretti High School	6 ft 8 in (2.03 m)	220 lb (100 kg)	Jul 10, 2018
Abdou Tsimbila; C	Recruit ratings: Scout: Rivals: 247Sports: ESPN:				
Patrick Kelly; PF	Lynchburg, VA	Virginia Episcopal School	6 ft 7 in (2.01 m)	190 lb (86 kg)	Feb 2, 2018
Patrick Kelly; PF	Recruit ratings: Scout: Rivals: 247Sports: ESPN:				
Overall recruit ranking:
Note: In many cases, Scout, Rivals, 247Sports, On3, and ESPN may conflict in their listings of height and weight.; In these cases, the average was taken. ESPN grades are on a 100-point scale.; Sources: "2019 Team Ranking". Rivals.

==== 2020 recruiting class ====
College recruiting information (2020)
Name	Hometown	School	Height	Weight	Commit date
Dallion Johnson; SG	Haverhill, MA	Phillips Academy	6 ft 2 in (1.88 m)	170 lb (77 kg)	Jul 15, 2019
Dallion Johnson; SG	Recruit ratings: Scout: Rivals: 247Sports: ESPN:				
Overall recruit ranking:
Note: In many cases, Scout, Rivals, 247Sports, On3, and ESPN may conflict in their listings of height and weight.; In these cases, the average was taken. ESPN grades are on a 100-point scale.; Sources: "2020 Team Ranking". Rivals.

== Roster ==
2019–20 Penn State Nittany Lions men's basketball team
Players
Coaches

Pos.	#	Name	Height	Weight	Year	Previous school	Hometown
G	0	Myreon Jones	6 ft 3 in (1.91 m)	175 lb (79 kg)	So	Lincoln Academy	Birmingham, AL
F	1	Seth Lundy	6 ft 6 in (1.98 m)	219 lb (99 kg)	Fr	Roman Catholic	Paulsboro, NJ
G	2	Myles Dread	6 ft 4 in (1.93 m)	215 lb (98 kg)	So	Gonzaga	Burtonsville, MD
G	4	Curtis Jones Jr.	6 ft 4 in (1.93 m)	180 lb (82 kg)	Sr	Huntington Prep; Oklahoma State	Richmond, VA
G	5	Jamari Wheeler	6 ft 1 in (1.85 m)	170 lb (77 kg)	Jr	Rock School	Gainesville, FL
G	10	Kyle McCloskey (W)	6 ft 5 in (1.96 m)	212 lb (96 kg)	RS So	Germantown Academy	Lower Gwynedd, PA
F	11	Lamar Stevens	6 ft 8 in (2.03 m)	225 lb (102 kg)	Sr	Roman Catholic	Philadelphia, PA
G	12	Izaiah Brockington	6 ft 4 in (1.93 m)	200 lb (91 kg)	RS So	Archbishop Ryan; St. Bonaventure	Philadelphia, PA
F	14	Patrick Kelly	6 ft 7 in (2.01 m)	215 lb (98 kg)	Fr	IMG Academy	Raleigh, NC
G	20	Taylor Nussbaum (W)	6 ft 2 in (1.88 m)	175 lb (79 kg)	Jr	Cheshire Academy	South Salem, NY
F	21	John Harrar	6 ft 9 in (2.06 m)	240 lb (109 kg)	Jr	Strath Haven	Atlanta, GA
F	22	Grant Hazle (W)	6 ft 6 in (1.98 m)	194 lb (88 kg)	Sr	Westbury Christian	Kingwood, TX
F	24	Mike Watkins	6 ft 9 in (2.06 m)	257 lb (117 kg)	RS Sr	Phelps School	Philadelphia, PA
F	35	Trent Buttrick	6 ft 8 in (2.03 m)	234 lb (106 kg)	Jr	Community School of Naples (Fla.)	Bloomsburg, PA

Head coach

- Pat Chambers (Philadelphia)

Assistant coach(es)

- Keith Urgo (Fairfield)
- Jim Ferry (Keene State)
- Kevin Freeman (Connecticut)

Legend

- (C) Team captain
- (S) Suspended
- (I) Ineligible
- (W) Walk-on
- Injured
- Current redshirt

Roster

=== Coaching staff ===
Position	Name	Year	Alma mater
Head coach	Patrick Chambers	2011	Philadelphia University (1994)
Associate head coach	Keith Urgo	2011	Fairfield University (2002)
Assistant coach	Kevin Freeman	2018	University of Connecticut (2000)
Assistant coach	Jim Ferry	2017	Keene State (1990)
Director of Basketball Operations	Ross Condon	2011	Villanova University (2007)
On campus recruiting coordinator	Nicholas Colella	2015	Penn State (2013)
Athletic trainer	Jon Salazer	2001	Penn State (1993)
Director of player development	David Caporaletti	2011	Philadelphia University (1993)
Strength and conditioning coach	Greg Miskinis	2009	Penn State (2008)
Graduate Manager	K.J. Baptiste	2019	Brandeis University (2018)
Graduate Manager	Kevin Hudash	2018	Penn State (2017)

== Schedule and results ==
Date time, TV	Rank^{#}	Opponent^{#}	Result	Record	High points	High rebounds	High assists	Site (attendance) city, state
Regular season
November 5, 2019*; 7:00 p.m., BTN Plus		Maryland Eastern Shore	W 84–46	1–0	17 – Stevens	11 – Watkins	6 – M. Jones	Bryce Jordan Center (5,869); University Park, PA
November 9, 2019*; 4:00 p.m., BTN Plus		Wagner	W 91–64	2–0	14 – M. Jones	8 – Watkins	5 – Dread	Bryce Jordan Center (6,372); University Park, PA
November 14, 2019*; 6:30 p.m., FS1		at Georgetown; Gavitt Tipoff Games	W 81–66	3–0	21 – M. Jones	9 – Stevens	5 – Wheeler	Capital One Arena (8,691); Washington, D.C.
November 19, 2019*; 6:30 p.m., BTN		Bucknell; NIT Season Tip-Off	W 98–70	4–0	27 – Stevens	8 – Stevens	4 – Tied	Bryce Jordan Center (6,797); University Park, PA
November 23, 2019*; 4:00 pm, BTN Plus		Yale; NIT Season Tip-Off	W 58–56	5–0	15 – Brockington	13 – Stevens	4 – Jones	Bryce Jordan Center (6,091); University Park, PA
November 27, 2019*; 5:00 pm, ESPN2		vs. Ole Miss; NIT Season Tip-Off semifinal	L 72–74	5–1	22 – Stevens	12 – Watkins	5 – M. Jones	Barclays Center (4,114); Brooklyn, NY
November 29, 2019*; 7:00 pm, ESPN2		vs. Syracuse; NIT Season Tip-Off 3rd place game	W 85–64	6–1	20 – Stevens	15 – Watkins	4 – Stevens	Barclays Center (4,159); Brooklyn, NY
December 4, 2019*; 9:15 p.m., ESPNU		Wake Forest; ACC–Big Ten Challenge	W 76–54	7–1	22 – M. Jones	16 – Watkins	3 – Tied	Bryce Jordan Center (6,476); University Park, PA
December 7, 2019; 12:00 p.m., BTN		at No. 6 Ohio State	L 74–106	7–2 (0–1)	19 – Brockington	3 – Tied	2 – Tied	Value City Arena (12,901); Columbus, OH
December 10, 2019; 7:00 p.m., ESPN2		No. 4 Maryland	W 76–69	8–2 (1–1)	15 – Tied	11 – Watkins	6 – Jones	Bryce Jordan Center (8,643); University Park, PA
December 14, 2019*; 2:00 p.m., BTN		Alabama	W 73–71	9–2	18 – Stevens	11 – Stevens	6 – Stevens	Bryce Jordan Center (7,736); University Park, PA
December 20, 2019*; 6:00 p.m., BTN	No. 23	Central Connecticut	W 87–58	10–2	21 – M. Jones	8 – Watkins	7 – Wheeler	Bryce Jordan Center (6,404); University Park, PA
December 29, 2019*; 12:00 p.m., ESPNU	No. 20	Cornell	W 90–59	11–2	19 – Tied	10 – Watkins	4 – Tied	Bryce Jordan Center (8,316); University Park, PA
January 4, 2020; 2:00 p.m., BTN	No. 21	vs. No. 23 Iowa	W 89–86	12–2 (2–1)	23 – Brockington	7 – Dread	4 – Dread	Palestra (7,881); Philadelphia, PA
January 7, 2020; 7:00 p.m., BTN	No. 20	at Rutgers	L 61–72	12–3 (2–2)	21 – M. Jones	6 – Tied	2 – Tied	Louis Brown Athletic Center (8,000); Piscataway, NJ
January 11, 2020; 2:15 p.m., BTN	No. 20	Wisconsin	L 49–58	12–4 (2–3)	19 – Stevens	13 – Stevens	2 – Tied	Bryce Jordan Center (10,139); University Park, PA
January 15, 2020; 9:00 p.m., BTN		at Minnesota	L 69–75	12–5 (2–4)	15 – Tied	5 – Tied	4 – Wheeler	Williams Arena (9,714); Minneapolis, MN
January 18, 2020; 12:00 p.m., ESPNU		No. 21 Ohio State	W 90–76	13–5 (3–4)	24 – Stevens	5 – Tied	4 – M. Jones	Bryce Jordan Center (14,785); University Park, PA
January 22, 2020; 7:00 p.m., BTN		at Michigan	W 72–63	14–5 (4–4)	19 – Stevens	9 – Stevens	4 – Wheeler	Crisler Center (12,707); Ann Arbor, MI
January 29, 2020; 8:30 p.m., BTN	No. 24	Indiana	W 64–49	15–5 (5–4)	17 – Stevens	9 – Stevens	5 – Wheeler	Bryce Jordan Center (7,656); University Park, PA
February 1, 2020; 7:00 p.m., BTN	No. 24	at Nebraska	W 76–64	16–5 (6–4)	14 – Dread	17 – Watkins	6 – M. Jones	Pinnacle Bank Arena (15,901); Lincoln, NE
February 4, 2020; 8:00 p.m., BTN	No. 22	at No. 16 Michigan State	W 75–70	17–5 (7–4)	24 – Stevens	7 – Stevens	5 – M. Jones	Breslin Center (14,797); East Lansing, MI
February 8, 2020; 4:00 p.m., BTN	No. 22	Minnesota	W 83–77	18–5 (8–4)	33 – Stevens	7 – Tied	4 – Harrar	Bryce Jordan Center (15,261); University Park, PA
February 11, 2020; 6:30 p.m., BTN	No. 13	at Purdue	W 88–76	19–5 (9–4)	19 – Watkins	10 – Watkins	5 – Tied	Mackey Arena (14,804); West Lafayette, IN
February 15, 2020; 12:00 p.m., BTN	No. 13	Northwestern	W 77–61	20–5 (10–4)	23 – Stevens	9 – Watkins	6 – Wheeler	Bryce Jordan Center (14,402); University Park, PA
February 18, 2020; 6:30 p.m., FS1	No. 9	Illinois	L 56–62	20–6 (10–5)	13 – Stevens	9 – Stevens	6 – Wheeler	Bryce Jordan Center (9,506); University Park, PA
February 23, 2020; 12:00 p.m., FS1	No. 9	at Indiana	L 60–68	20–7 (10–6)	29 – Stevens	10 – Harrar	1 – Tied	Simon Skjodt Assembly Hall (17,222); Bloomington, IN
February 26, 2020; 7:00 p.m., BTN	No. 16	Rutgers	W 65–64	21–7 (11–6)	16 – Brockington	7 – Tied	7 – Dread	Bryce Jordan Center (8,345); University Park, PA
February 29, 2020; 12:00 p.m., BTN	No. 16	at No. 18 Iowa	L 68–77	21–8 (11–7)	20 – Stevens	10 – Stevens	4 – Jones	Carver–Hawkeye Arena (15,056); Iowa City, IA
March 3, 2020; 7:00 p.m., ESPN	No. 20	No. 16 Michigan State	L 71–79	21–9 (11–8)	16 – M. Jones	9 – Watkins	5 – Wheeler	Bryce Jordan Center (13,437); University Park, PA
March 7, 2020; 4:00 p.m., BTN	No. 20	at Northwestern	L 69–80	21–10 (11–9)	18 – Stevens	14 – Harrar	4 – Tied	Welsh–Ryan Arena (6,084); Evanston, IL
Big Ten tournament
March 12, 2020; 9:00 p.m., BTN	(6)	vs. (11) Indiana; Second round	Cancelled due to the COVID-19 pandemic					Bankers Life Fieldhouse; Indianapolis, IN
*Non-conference game. ^{#}Rankings from AP Poll. (#) Tournament seedings in parentheses. All times are in Eastern Time.

== Rankings ==
Ranking movements Legend: ██ Increase in ranking ██ Decrease in ranking — = Not ranked RV = Received votes
	Week																		
Poll	Pre	1	2	3	4	5	6	7	8	9	10	11	12	13	14	15	16	17	Final
AP	—	—	—	RV	RV	RV	23	20	21	20	RV	24	22	13	9	16	20	RV	RV
Coaches	—	—	RV	RV	RV	—	24	21	21	20	RV	23	20	13	9	14	20	RV	RV

*AP does not release post-NCAA Tournament rankings

On December 16, 2019 Penn State was ranked #23 in the Associated Press Poll marking its first appearance in the poll since 1996.
