= 2019–20 Rutgers Scarlet Knights men's basketball team =

American college basketball season

2019–20 Rutgers Scarlet Knights men's basketball
- Conference: Big Ten Conference
- Record: 20–11 (11–9 Big Ten)
- Head coach: Steve Pikiell (4th season)
- Assistant coaches: Karl Hobbs; Brandin Knight; Steve Hayn
- Home arena: Louis Brown Athletic Center

2019–20 Big Ten Conference men's basketball standings
	Conf.				Overall
Team	W		L	PCT	W		L	PCT
No. 17 Wisconsin	14	–	6	.700	21	–	10	.677
No. 9 Michigan State	14	–	6	.700	22	–	9	.710
No. 12 Maryland	14	–	6	.700	24	–	7	.774
No. 21 Illinois	13	–	7	.650	21	–	10	.677
No. 25 Iowa	11	–	9	.550	20	–	11	.645
Penn State	11	–	9	.550	21	–	10	.677
No. 19 Ohio State	11	–	9	.550	21	–	10	.677
Rutgers	11	–	9	.550	20	–	11	.645
Michigan	10	–	10	.500	19	–	12	.613
Purdue	9	–	11	.450	16	–	15	.516
Indiana	9	–	11	.450	20	–	12	.625
Minnesota	8	–	12	.400	15	–	16	.484
Northwestern	3	–	17	.150	8	–	23	.258
Nebraska	2	–	18	.100	7	–	25	.219
The 2020 Big Ten tournament was canceled prior to the second round due to the COVID-19 pandemic. Rankings from AP poll

The 2019–20 Rutgers Scarlet Knights men's basketball team represented Rutgers University–New Brunswick during the 2019–20 NCAA Division I men's basketball season. The Scarlet Knights were led by fourth-year head coach Steve Pikiell and played their home games at the Louis Brown Athletic Center in Piscataway, New Jersey as sixth-year members of the Big Ten Conference. They finished the season 20–11 and 11–9 in Big Ten play to finish in a four-way tie for fifth place. Following the regular season, the Big Ten tournament and all subsequent postseason tournaments were canceled due to the ongoing COVID-19 pandemic, effectively ending the Knights's season.

In January 2020, Rutgers was nationally ranked for the first time since 1979.

== Previous season ==
The Knights finished the 2018–19 season 14–17, 7–13 in Big Ten play to finish in a three-way tie for 10th place. In the Big Ten tournament, they lost in the first round to Nebraska.

== Offseason ==
=== Coaching changes ===
In April 2019, assistant Jay Young was hired as the new head coach at Fairfield. Pikiell elevated senior advisor Steve Hayn to assistant coach as his replacement in May 2019.

=== Departures ===
Name	Number	Pos.	Height	Weight	Year	Hometown	Reason for departure
Shaquille Doorson	2	C	7'0"	275	RS Senior	Amsterdam, Netherlands	Graduated
Eugene Omoruyi	5	F	6'6"	234	Junior	Rexdale, ON	Transferred to Oregon
Issa Thiam	35	F	6'9"	190	Junior	Dakar, Senegal	Dismissed from the team due to domestic violence

=== Incoming transfers ===
Name	Number	Pos.	Height	Weight	Year	Hometown	Previous School
Akwasi Yeboah	1	G/F	6'6"	235	RS Senior	Chigwell, England	Transferred from Stony Brook. Will be eligible to play since Yeboah graduated from Stony Brook.

=== 2019 recruiting class ===
College recruiting information
Name	Hometown	School	Height	Weight	Commit date
Paul Mulcahy #21 PG	Gladstone, NJ	Gill St. Bernard's School	6 ft 4 in (1.93 m)	185 lb (84 kg)	May 16, 2018
Paul Mulcahy #21 PG	Recruit ratings: Scout: Rivals: 247Sports: ESPN:				
Overall recruit ranking:
Note: In many cases, Scout, Rivals, 247Sports, On3, and ESPN may conflict in their listings of height and weight.; In these cases, the average was taken. ESPN grades are on a 100-point scale.; Sources: "2019 Team Ranking". Rivals.

== Roster ==
2019–20 Rutgers Scarlet Knights men's basketball team
Players
Coaches

Pos.	#	Name	Height	Weight	Year	Previous school	Hometown
G	0	Geo Baker	6 ft 4 in (1.93 m)	185 lb (84 kg)	Jr	Proctor Academy	Derry, NH
F	1	Akwasi Yeboah	6 ft 6 in (1.98 m)	230 lb (104 kg)	RS Sr	Barking Abbey School; Stony Brook	Chigwell, England
F	2	Daniel Lobach (W)	6 ft 7 in (2.01 m)	205 lb (93 kg)	Fr	Moravian Prep	Erwin, NC
G	3	Nick Brooks (W)	6 ft 1 in (1.85 m)	180 lb (82 kg)	RS Jr	Vermont Academy; West Virginia Wesleyan	Somerset, NJ
G	4	Paul Mulcahy	6 ft 6 in (1.98 m)	205 lb (93 kg)	Fr	Gill St. Bernard's	Bayonne, NJ
G	10	Joey Downes	5 ft 11 in (1.8 m)	175 lb (79 kg)	RS Jr	East Sandwich/Bridgton Academy	East Sandwich, MA
F	11	Mamadou Doucoure	6 ft 9 in (2.06 m)	250 lb (113 kg)	Jr	Our Savior New American School	Bamako, Mali
F	13	Shaq Carter	6 ft 9 in (2.06 m)	250 lb (113 kg)	Sr	Zion Lutheran High School; Eastern Florida State	Hollywood, FL
C	15	Myles Johnson	6 ft 11 in (2.11 m)	255 lb (116 kg)	RS So	Long Beach Poly	Long Beach, CA
G	22	Caleb McConnell	6 ft 7 in (2.01 m)	190 lb (86 kg)	So	SPIRE Institute	Jacksonville, FL
G	23	Montez Mathis	6 ft 4 in (1.93 m)	205 lb (93 kg)	So	The John Carroll School	Baltimore, MD
G/F	24	Ron Harper Jr.	6 ft 6 in (1.98 m)	245 lb (111 kg)	So	Don Bosco Prep	Franklin Lakes, NJ
G	32	Peter Kiss	6 ft 5 in (1.96 m)	200 lb (91 kg)	RS Jr	Notre Dame Prep; Qunnipiac	New York City, NY
G	42	Jacob Young	6 ft 2 in (1.88 m)	185 lb (84 kg)	RS Jr	Yates; Texas	Houston, TX
F/C	55	Luke Nathan (W)	6 ft 11 in (2.11 m)	245 lb (111 kg)	Jr	Randolph	Randolph, NJ

Head coach

- Steve Pikiell (Connecticut)

Assistant coach(es)

- Karl Hobbs (Connecticut)
- Brandin Knight (Pittsburgh)
- Steve Hayn (Stony Brook)

Legend

- (C) Team captain
- (S) Suspended
- (I) Ineligible
- (W) Walk-on
- Injured
- Current redshirt

Roster

== Schedule and results ==
Date time, TV	Rank^{#}	Opponent^{#}	Result	Record	High points	High rebounds	High assists	Site (attendance) city, state
Regular season
November 7, 2019*; 7:00 p.m., BTN		Bryant; Garden State Showcase	W 73–71	1–0	11 – Tied	8 – Baker	6 – Baker	Louis Brown Athletic Center (5,692); Piscataway, NJ
November 10, 2019*; 1:00 p.m., BTN Plus		Niagara; Garden State Showcase	W 86–39	2–0	22 – Baker	8 – Harper Jr.	6 – Mulcahy	Louis Brown Athletic Center (4,203); Piscataway, NJ
November 13, 2019*; 8:00 p.m., BTN Plus		Drexel; Garden State Showcase	W 62–57	3–0	13 – Tied	8 – Harper Jr.	4 – Baker	Louis Brown Athletic Center (6,017); Piscataway, NJ
November 16, 2019*; 7:30 p.m., ESPN+		vs. St. Bonaventure; James Naismith Classic	L 74–80	3–1	13 – McConnell	6 – Tied	8 – Young	Scotiabank Arena (6,802); Toronto, ON, Canada
November 20, 2019*; 7:00 p.m., BTN Plus		Stephen F. Austin; Garden State Showcase	W 69–57	4–1	16 – McConnell	8 – Johnson	4 – Baker	Louis Brown Athletic Center (4,536); Piscataway, NJ
November 26, 2019*; 7:00 p.m., BTN		NJIT	W 85–58	5–1	25 – Harper Jr.	11 – Johnson	7 – Mulcahy	Louis Brown Athletic Center (4,509); Piscataway, NJ
November 29, 2019*; 2:00 p.m., BTN Plus		UMass	W 82–57	6–1	17 – Baker	10 – Johnson	4 – Baker	Louis Brown Athletic Center (5,592); Piscataway, NJ
December 3, 2019*; 9:00 p.m., ESPNU		at Pittsburgh; ACC–Big Ten Challenge	L 60–71	6–2	14 – Tied	14 – Johnson	5 – Baker	Petersen Events Center (7,894); Pittsburgh, PA
December 8, 2019; 7:00 p.m., BTN		at No. 11 Michigan State	L 65–77	6–3 (0–1)	17 – Yeboah	5 – Mathis	5 – Baker	Breslin Center (14,797); East Lansing, MI
December 11, 2019; 7:00 p.m., BTN		Wisconsin	W 72–65	7–3 (1–1)	22 – Baker	8 – Yeboah	4 – Baker	Louis Brown Athletic Center (6,361); Piscataway, NJ
December 14, 2019*; 4:00 p.m., BTN		No. 22 Seton Hall; Rivalry/Garden State Hardwood Classic	W 68–48	8–3	18 – Harper Jr.	13 – Johnson	5 – Baker	Louis Brown Athletic Center (8,329); Piscataway, NJ
December 22, 2019*; 1:00 p.m., ESPNU		Lafayette	W 63–44	9–3	18 – Johnson	14 – Johnson	5 – Mulcahy	Louis Brown Athletic Center (5,692); Piscataway, NJ
December 30, 2019*; 7:00 p.m., BTN Plus		Caldwell	W 94–49	10–3	23 – Young	10 – Johnson	6 – Young	Louis Brown Athletic Center (5,592); Piscataway, NJ
January 3, 2020; 8:00 p.m., BTN		at Nebraska	W 79–62	11–3 (2–1)	20 – McConnell	14 – Johnson	5 – McConnell	Pinnacle Bank Arena (15,024); Lincoln, NE
January 7, 2020; 7:00 p.m., BTN		No. 20 Penn State	W 72–61	12–3 (3–1)	22 – Harper Jr.	8 – McConnell	5 – Mulcahy	Louis Brown Athletic Center (8,000); Piscataway, NJ
January 11, 2020; 12:00 p.m., BTN		at Illinois	L 51–54	12–4 (3–2)	16 – Young	7 – McConnell	3 – Mathis	State Farm Center (11,070); Champaign, IL
January 15, 2020; 7:00 p.m., BTN		Indiana	W 59–50	13–4 (4–2)	14 – Yeboah	6 – Yeboah	5 – Baker	Louis Brown Athletic Center (8,000); Piscataway, NJ
January 19, 2020; 1:00 p.m., BTN		Minnesota	W 64–56	14–4 (5–2)	11 – Tied	12 – McConnell	2 – Tied	Louis Brown Athletic Center (8,000); Piscataway, NJ
January 22, 2020; 9:00 p.m., BTN	No. 24	at No. 19 Iowa	L 80–85	14–5 (5–3)	29 – Harper Jr.	9 – Harper Jr.	5 – McConnell	Carver–Hawkeye Arena (10,006); Iowa City, IA
January 25, 2020; 2:00 p.m., BTN	No. 24	Nebraska	W 75–72	15–5 (6–3)	20 – Yeboah	11 – Johnson	4 – Harper Jr.	Louis Brown Athletic Center (8,000); Piscataway, NJ
January 28, 2020; 8:00 p.m., BTN	No. 25	Purdue	W 70–63	16–5 (7–3)	16 – McConnell	7 – Tied	2 – Tied	Louis Brown Athletic Center (8,000); Piscataway, NJ
February 1, 2020; 4:30 p.m., BTN	No. 25	vs. Michigan; B1G Super Saturday	L 63–69	16–6 (7–4)	17 – Mathis	8 – Tied	3 – Baker	Madison Square Garden (13,127); New York, NY
February 4, 2020; 7:00 p.m., FS1		at No. 9 Maryland	L 51–56	16–7 (7–5)	13 – Yeboah	8 – Johnson	3 – Baker	Xfinity Center (15,855); College Park, MD
February 9, 2020; 6:30 p.m., BTN		Northwestern	W 77–73 ^{OT}	17–7 (8–5)	25 – Baker	10 – Johnson	5 – Baker	Louis Brown Athletic Center (8,000); Piscataway, NJ
February 12, 2020; 7:00 p.m., BTN		at Ohio State	L 66–72	17–8 (8–6)	17 – Young	6 – Yeboah	4 – Yeboah	Value City Arena (15,552); Columbus, OH
February 15, 2020; 4:30 p.m., BTN		No. 22 Illinois	W 72–57	18–8 (9–6)	27 – Harper Jr.	11 – Johnson	7 – Baker	Louis Brown Athletic Center (8,000); Piscataway, NJ
February 19, 2020; 7:00 p.m., BTN		Michigan	L 52–60	18–9 (9–7)	16 – Baker	5 – Tied	2 – Harper Jr.	Louis Brown Athletic Center (8,000); Piscataway, NJ
February 23, 2020; 1:00 p.m., BTN		at Wisconsin	L 71–79	18–10 (9–8)	21 – Harper Jr.	9 – Harper Jr.	6 – Baker	Kohl Center (17,287); Madison, WI
February 26, 2020; 7:00 p.m., BTN		at No. 16 Penn State	L 64–65	18–11 (9–9)	13 – Young	11 – Johnson	5 – Young	Bryce Jordan Center (8,345); University Park, PA
March 3, 2020; 7:00 p.m., BTN		No. 9 Maryland	W 78–67	19–11 (10–9)	17 – Young	8 – Tied	4 – Baker	Louis Brown Athletic Center (8,000); Piscataway, NJ
March 7, 2020; 2:00 p.m., BTN		at Purdue	W 71–68 ^{OT}	20–11 (11–9)	19 – Baker	6 – Tied	3 – Baker	Mackey Arena (14,804); West Lafayette, IN
Big Ten tournament
March 12, 2020*; 12:00 pm, BTN	(8)	vs. (9) Michigan; Second round	Cancelled due to the COVID-19 pandemic					Bankers Life Fieldhouse; Indianapolis, IN
*Non-conference game. ^{#}Rankings from AP Poll. (#) Tournament seedings in parentheses. All times are in Eastern Time.

== Rankings ==
Ranking movements Legend: ██ Increase in ranking ██ Decrease in ranking — = Not ranked RV = Received votes
	Week																			
Poll	Pre	1	2	3	4	5	6	7	8	9	10	11	12	13	14	15	16	17	18	Final
AP	—	—	—	—	—	—	—	—	—	—	RV	24	25	RV	RV	RV	—	—	RV	RV
Coaches	—	—	—	—	—	—	—	—	—	—	RV	25	25	RV	RV	RV	—	—	RV	RV

*AP does not release post-NCAA Tournament rankings
