= 2019–20 Ohio State Buckeyes men's basketball team =

American college basketball season

2019–20 Ohio State Buckeyes men's basketball
- Conference: Big Ten Conference

Ranking
- Coaches: No. 18
- AP: No. 19
- Record: 21–10 (11–9 Big Ten)
- Head coach: Chris Holtmann (3rd season)
- Assistant coaches: Ryan Pedon (3rd season); Terry Johnson (3rd season); Jake Diebler (1st season)
- Home arena: Value City Arena

2019–20 Big Ten Conference men's basketball standings
	Conf.				Overall
Team	W		L	PCT	W		L	PCT
No. 17 Wisconsin	14	–	6	.700	21	–	10	.677
No. 9 Michigan State	14	–	6	.700	22	–	9	.710
No. 12 Maryland	14	–	6	.700	24	–	7	.774
No. 21 Illinois	13	–	7	.650	21	–	10	.677
No. 25 Iowa	11	–	9	.550	20	–	11	.645
Penn State	11	–	9	.550	21	–	10	.677
No. 19 Ohio State	11	–	9	.550	21	–	10	.677
Rutgers	11	–	9	.550	20	–	11	.645
Michigan	10	–	10	.500	19	–	12	.613
Purdue	9	–	11	.450	16	–	15	.516
Indiana	9	–	11	.450	20	–	12	.625
Minnesota	8	–	12	.400	15	–	16	.484
Northwestern	3	–	17	.150	8	–	23	.258
Nebraska	2	–	18	.100	7	–	25	.219
The 2020 Big Ten tournament was canceled prior to the second round due to the COVID-19 pandemic. Rankings from AP poll

The 2019–20 Ohio State Buckeyes men's basketball team represented Ohio State University in the 2019–20 NCAA Division I men's basketball season. Their head coach was Chris Holtmann, in his third season with the Buckeyes. The Buckeyes played their home games at Value City Arena in Columbus, Ohio as members of the Big Ten Conference. They finished the season 21–10, 11–9 in Big Ten play to finish in a four-way tie for fifth place. Following the regular season, the Big Ten tournament was canceled due to the ongoing COVID-19 pandemic. Shortly thereafter, all postseason tournaments were canceled due to the pandemic, ending the Buckeyes' season.

== Previous season ==
The Buckeyes finished the 2018–19 season 20–15, 8–12 in Big Ten play to finish in a tie for eighth place. As the No. 8 seed in the Big Ten tournament, they defeated Indiana in the second round 79–75 before losing to Michigan State in the quarterfinals 77–70. They received an at-large bid to the NCAA tournament as the No. 11 seed in the Midwest region. There they upset Iowa State in the First Round before losing to Houston in the Second Round.

== Offseason ==
=== Departures ===
Name	Number	Pos.	Height	Weight	Year	Hometown	Reason for departure
C. J. Jackson	3	G	6'1"	175	Senior	Charlotte, NC	Graduated
Joey Lane	14	G	6'1"	180	Senior	Deerfield, IL	Walk-on; graduated
Jaedon LeDee	23	F	6'9"	230	Freshman	Houston, TX	Transferred to TCU
Keyshawn Woods	32	G	6'3"	205	Graduate Student	Gastonia, NC	Graduated

=== Coaching changes ===
In April 2019, assistant coach Mike Schrage was hired as the new head coach at Elon. Holtmann hired Jake Diebler as Schrage's replacement later that month.

=== Incoming transfers ===
Name	Number	Pos.	Height	Weight	Year	Hometown	Previous School
Justice Sueing	14	F	6'7"	215	Junior	Honolulu, HI	Transferred from California. Under NCAA transfer rules, Sueing will have to sit out for the 2019–20 season. Will have two years of remaining eligibility.

=== 2019 recruiting class ===
College recruiting
Name	Hometown	School	Height	Weight	Commit date
D. J. Carton #5 PG	Bettendorf, IA	Bettendorf High School	6 ft 1 in (1.85 m)	180 lb (82 kg)	Jul 14, 2018
D. J. Carton #5 PG	Recruit ratings: Scout: Rivals: 247Sports: ESPN:				
Alonzo Gaffney #5 SF	Cleveland, OH	Brewster Academy	6 ft 8 in (2.03 m)	185 lb (84 kg)	Apr 10, 2018
Alonzo Gaffney #5 SF	Recruit ratings: Scout: Rivals: 247Sports: ESPN:				
E. J. Liddell #8 PF	Belleville, IL	Belleville West	6 ft 6 in (1.98 m)	220 lb (100 kg)	Oct 1, 2018
E. J. Liddell #8 PF	Recruit ratings: Scout: Rivals: 247Sports: ESPN:				
Ibrahima Diallo #64 C	Saly, Senegal	Prolific Prep	7 ft 0 in (2.13 m)	200 lb (91 kg)	Apr 14, 2019
Ibrahima Diallo #64 C	Recruit ratings: Scout: Rivals: 247Sports: ESPN:				
Overall recruit ranking:
Note: In many cases, Scout, Rivals, 247Sports, On3, and ESPN may conflict in their listings of height and weight.; In these cases, the average was taken. ESPN grades are on a 100-point scale.; Sources: "2019 Team Ranking". Rivals.

=== 2020 Recruiting class ===
College recruiting (2020)
Name	Hometown	School	Height	Weight	Commit date
Eugene Brown III #22 SG	Decatur, GA	Southwest DeKalb	6 ft 6 in (1.98 m)	185 lb (84 kg)	Sep 16, 2019
Eugene Brown III #22 SG	Recruit ratings: Scout: Rivals: 247Sports: ESPN:				
Meechie Johnson #23 PG	Cleveland, OH	Garfield Heights	6 ft 1 in (1.85 m)	185 lb (84 kg)	Aug 13, 2019
Meechie Johnson #23 PG	Recruit ratings: Scout: Rivals: 247Sports: ESPN:				
Zed Key #33 PF	Glen Head, NY	Long Island Lutheran	6 ft 7 in (2.01 m)	215 lb (98 kg)	Sep 22, 2019
Zed Key #33 PF	Recruit ratings: Scout: Rivals: 247Sports: ESPN:				
Overall recruit ranking:
Note: In many cases, Scout, Rivals, 247Sports, On3, and ESPN may conflict in their listings of height and weight.; In these cases, the average was taken. ESPN grades are on a 100-point scale.; Sources: "2020 Team Ranking". Rivals.

== Roster ==
2019–20 Ohio State Buckeyes men's basketball team
Players
Coaches

Pos.	#	Name	Height	Weight	Year	Previous school	Hometown
F	0	Alonzo Gaffney	6 ft 9 in (2.06 m)	198 lb (90 kg)	Fr	Brewster Academy	Cleveland, Ohio
G	1	Luther Muhammad	6 ft 3 in (1.91 m)	185 lb (84 kg)	So	Hudson Catholic Regional High School	Jersey City, New Jersey
G	2	Musa Jallow (redshirt)	6 ft 5 in (1.96 m)	200 lb (91 kg)	Jr	Bloomington High School North	Bloomington, Indiana
G	3	D. J. Carton	6 ft 1 in (1.85 m)	190 lb (86 kg)	Fr	Bettendorf High School	Bettendorf, Iowa
G	4	Duane Washington Jr.	6 ft 3 in (1.91 m)	190 lb (86 kg)	So	Sierra Canyon School	Grand Rapids, Michigan
F	10	Justin Ahrens	6 ft 5 in (1.96 m)	180 lb (82 kg)	So	Versailles High School	Versailles, Ohio
G	13	CJ Walker	6 ft 1 in (1.85 m)	195 lb (88 kg)	RS Jr	Florida State	Indianapolis, Indiana
F	14	Justice Sueing (redshirt)	6 ft 6 in (1.98 m)	210 lb (95 kg)	Jr	California	Honolulu, Hawaii
C	15	Ibrahima Diallo	6 ft 10 in (2.08 m)	220 lb (100 kg)	Fr	Prolific Prep	Saly, Senegal
F	24	Andre Wesson	6 ft 6 in (1.98 m)	220 lb (100 kg)	Sr	Westerville South High School	Westerville, Ohio
F	25	Kyle Young	6 ft 8 in (2.03 m)	205 lb (93 kg)	Jr	Jackson High School	Canton, Ohio
F	32	E. J. Liddell	6 ft 6 in (1.98 m)	236 lb (107 kg)	Fr	Belleville High School-West	Belleville, Illinois
F	34	Kaleb Wesson	6 ft 9 in (2.06 m)	270 lb (122 kg)	Jr	Westerville South High School	Westerville, Ohio
G	40	Daniel Hummer (W)	6 ft 0 in (1.83 m)	175 lb (79 kg)	RS Sr	Air Force	Upper Arlington, Ohio
F	42	Harrison Hookfin (W)	6 ft 5 in (1.96 m)	220 lb (100 kg)	So	Lebanon High School	Lebanon, Ohio

Head coach

- Chris Holtmann (Taylor)

Assistant coach(es)

- Ryan Pedon (Wooster)
- Terry Johnson (Purdue Fort Wayne)
- Jake Diebler (Valparaiso)

Legend

- (C) Team captain
- (S) Suspended
- (I) Ineligible
- (W) Walk-on
- Injured
- Current redshirt

Roster

== Schedule and results ==
Date time, TV	Rank^{#}	Opponent^{#}	Result	Record	High points	High rebounds	High assists	Site (attendance) city, state
Exhibition
October 30, 2019*; 7:00 p.m., BTN Plus	No. 18	Cedarville	W 95–52	–	23 – K. Wesson	9 – Young	5 – Carton	Value City Arena (12,656); Columbus, OH
Regular season
November 6, 2019*; 8:30 p.m., FS1	No. 18	Cincinnati	W 64–56	1–0	14 – Young	13 – Young	2 – Tied	Value City Arena (13,845); Columbus, OH
November 10, 2019*; 4:00 p.m., ESPNU	No. 18	UMass Lowell	W 76–56	2–0	13 – Tied	13 – K. Wesson	5 – K. Wesson	Value City Arena (11,632); Columbus, OH
November 13, 2019*; 7:00 p.m., FS1	No. 16	No. 10 Villanova; Gavitt Tipoff Games	W 76–51	3–0	14 – Washington	11 – K. Wesson	7 – Walker	Value City Arena (16,419); Columbus, OH
November 18, 2019*; 8:30 p.m., BTN	No. 10	Stetson; Ohio State Classic	W 86–51	4–0	15 – Young	10 – Young	5 – Tied	Value City Arena (9,774); Columbus, OH
November 22, 2019*; 7:00 p.m., BTN Plus	No. 10	Purdue Fort Wayne; Ohio State Classic	W 85–46	5–0	15 – K. Wesson	7 – K. Wesson	5 – Washington	Value City Arena (11,609); Columbus, OH
November 25, 2019*; 6:30 p.m., BTN	No. 10	Kent State; Ohio State Classic	W 71–52	6–0	17 – K. Wesson	7 – Washington	3 – Tied	St. John Arena (8,850); Columbus, OH
November 29, 2019*; 9:00 p.m., BTN	No. 10	Morgan State	W 90–57	7–0	19 – A. Wesson	8 – K. Wesson	3 – Walker	Value City Arena (10,947); Columbus, OH
December 4, 2019*; 9:30 p.m., ESPN	No. 6	at No. 7 North Carolina; ACC–Big Ten Challenge	W 74–49	8–0	18 – Washington	9 – Tied	5 – A. Wesson	Dean Smith Center (21,115); Chapel Hill, NC
December 7, 2019; 12:00 p.m., BTN	No. 6	Penn State	W 106–74	9–0 (1–0)	28 – K. Wesson	10 – K. Wesson	7 – Walker	Value City Arena (12,901); Columbus, OH
December 15, 2019; 6:30 p.m., BTN	No. 3	at Minnesota	L 71–84	9–1 (1–1)	19 – Carton	6 – K. Wesson	3 – K. Wesson	Williams Arena (9,854); Minneapolis, MN
December 17, 2019*; 7:00 p.m., BTN	No. 5	Southeast Missouri State	W 80–48	10–1	18 – K. Wesson	10 – K. Wesson	6 – Walker	Value City Arena (13,177); Columbus, OH
December 21, 2019*; 5:15 p.m., CBS	No. 5	vs. No. 6 Kentucky; CBS Sports Classic	W 71–65	11–1	15 – Carton	8 – K. Wesson	5 – Walker	T-Mobile Arena (18,800); Paradise, NV
December 29, 2019*; 12:00 p.m., FS1	No. 2	vs. No. 22 West Virginia; Cleveland Classic	L 59–67	11–2	17 – K. Wesson	11 – Young	3 – Muhammad	Rocket Mortgage FieldHouse (16,781); Cleveland, OH
January 3, 2020*; 7:00 p.m., FS1	No. 5	Wisconsin	L 57–61	11–3 (1–2)	22 – K. Wesson	13 – K. Wesson	4 – A. Wesson	Value City Arena (19,049); Columbus, OH
January 7, 2020; 7:00 p.m., ESPN	No. 11	at No. 12 Maryland	L 55–67	11–4 (1–3)	15 – K. Wesson	9 – K. Wesson	3 – Tied	Xfinity Center (16,192); College Park, MD
January 11, 2020; 12:00 p.m., FOX	No. 11	at Indiana	L 54–66	11–5 (1–4)	15 – A. Wesson	10 – K. Wesson	3 – Carton	Simon Skjodt Assembly Hall (15,456); Bloomington, IN
January 14, 2020; 6:30 p.m., FS1	No. 21	Nebraska	W 80–68	12–5 (2–4)	18 – Walker	14 – K. Wesson	5 – Carton	Value City Arena (12,954); Columbus, OH
January 18, 2020; 12:00 p.m., ESPNU	No. 21	at Penn State	L 76–90	12–6 (2–5)	20 – Washington	5 – Tied	6 – Carton	Bryce Jordan Center (14,785); University Park, PA
January 23, 2020; 6:30 p.m., FS1		Minnesota	L 59–62	12–7 (2–6)	14 – Young	14 – K. Wesson	3 – K. Wesson	Value City Arena (13,234); Columbus, OH
January 26, 2020; 6:30 p.m., BTN		at Northwestern	W 71–59	13–7 (3–6)	17 – Carton	10 – K. Wesson	5 – Walker	Welsh-Ryan Arena (6,121); Evanston, IL
February 1, 2020; 12:00 p.m., ESPN		Indiana	W 68–59	14–7 (4–6)	15 – K. Wesson	11 – K. Wesson	4 – Tied	Value City Arena (18,809); Columbus, OH
February 4, 2020; 7:00 p.m., ESPN2		at Michigan	W 61–58	15–7 (5–6)	23 – K. Wesson	12 – K. Wesson	5 – Walker	Crisler Center (12,707); Ann Arbor, MI
February 9, 2020; 1:00 p.m., CBS		at Wisconsin	L 57–70	15–8 (5–7)	11 – A. Wesson	6 – K. Wesson	3 – Young	Kohl Center (17,287); Madison, WI
February 12, 2020; 7:00 p.m., BTN		Rutgers	W 72–66	16–8 (6–7)	16 – K. Wesson	10 – A. Wesson	5 – Tied	Value City Arena (15,552); Columbus, OH
February 15, 2020; 12:00 p.m., FOX		Purdue	W 68–52	17–8 (7–7)	16 – Young	8 – K. Wesson	4 – Tied	Value City Arena (18,809); Columbus, OH
February 20, 2020; 7:00 p.m., ESPN	No. 25	at No. 20 Iowa	L 76–85	17–9 (7–8)	17 – Liddell	8 – Liddell	7 – Walker	Carver–Hawkeye Arena (14,001); Iowa City, IA
February 23, 2020; 4:00 p.m., CBS	No. 25	No. 7 Maryland	W 79–72	18–9 (8–8)	22 – Muhammad	9 – K. Wesson	3 – Tied	Value City Arena (18,809); Columbus, OH
February 27, 2020; 9:00 p.m., ESPN2	No. 23	at Nebraska	W 75–54	19–9 (9–8)	16 – K. Wesson	18 – K. Wesson	3 – Walker	Pinnacle Bank Arena (15,611); Lincoln, NE
March 1, 2020; 4:00 p.m., CBS	No. 23	No. 19 Michigan	W 77–63	20–9 (10–8)	20 – Washington	9 – K. Wesson	7 – Walker	Value City Arena (18,809); Columbus, OH
March 5, 2020; 7:00 p.m., ESPN	No. 19	No. 23 Illinois	W 71–63	21–9 (11–8)	19 – K. Wesson	11 – Liddell	5 – Walker	Value City Arena (16,382); Columbus, OH
March 8, 2020; 4:30 p.m., CBS	No. 19	at No. 16 Michigan State	L 69–80	21–10 (11–9)	16 – Washington	6 – K. Wesson	2 – A. Wesson	Breslin Center (14,797); East Lansing, MI
Big Ten tournament
March 12, 2020; 6:30 p.m., BTN	(7) No. 19	vs. (10) Purdue; Second round	Cancelled due to the COVID-19 pandemic					Bankers Life Fieldhouse; Indianapolis, IN
*Non-conference game. ^{#}Rankings from AP Poll. (#) Tournament seedings in parentheses. All times are in Eastern Time.

== Rankings ==
Ranking movements Legend: ██ Increase in ranking ██ Decrease in ranking RV = Received votes ( ) = First-place votes
	Week																			
Poll	Pre	1	2	3	4	5	6	7	8	9	10	11	12	13	14	15	16	17	18	Final
AP	18	16	10	10	6	3 (5)	5	2 (9)	5	11	21	RV	RV	RV	RV	25	23	19	19	19
Coaches	16	16	9	9 (1)	6 (1)	2 (2)	4	2 (7)	5	12	19	RV	RV	RV	RV	24	23	19	20	18

*AP does not release post-NCAA Tournament rankings

== Individual awards ==
Weekly Awards
Player	Award	Date Awarded	Ref.
Kaleb Wesson	Big Ten Player of the Week	November 18, 2019	
