= 2020 Big Ten men's basketball tournament =

- Classification: Division I
- Season: 2019–20
- Teams: 14
- Site: Bankers Life Fieldhouse; Indianapolis, Indiana
- Television: BTN, CBS

2019–20 Big Ten Conference men's basketball standings
	Conf.				Overall
Team	W		L	PCT	W		L	PCT
No. 17 Wisconsin	14	–	6	.700	21	–	10	.677
No. 9 Michigan State	14	–	6	.700	22	–	9	.710
No. 12 Maryland	14	–	6	.700	24	–	7	.774
No. 21 Illinois	13	–	7	.650	21	–	10	.677
No. 25 Iowa	11	–	9	.550	20	–	11	.645
Penn State	11	–	9	.550	21	–	10	.677
No. 19 Ohio State	11	–	9	.550	21	–	10	.677
Rutgers	11	–	9	.550	20	–	11	.645
Michigan	10	–	10	.500	19	–	12	.613
Purdue	9	–	11	.450	16	–	15	.516
Indiana	9	–	11	.450	20	–	12	.625
Minnesota	8	–	12	.400	15	–	16	.484
Northwestern	3	–	17	.150	8	–	23	.258
Nebraska	2	–	18	.100	7	–	25	.219
The 2020 Big Ten tournament was canceled prior to the second round due to the COVID-19 pandemic. Rankings from AP poll

The 2020 Big Ten men's basketball tournament was the postseason men's basketball tournament for the Big Ten Conference of the 2019–20 NCAA Division I men's basketball season. The tournament remained in its more traditional Midwest roots as it was held at the Bankers Life Fieldhouse in Indianapolis, Indiana.

The first-round games on March 11 were played with spectators in attendance. Later on March 11, the Big Ten conference announced that the remainder of the Big Ten tournament would proceed as scheduled but with no spectators in attendance due to the outbreak of the COVID-19 pandemic.

Also on March 11, the NCAA announced that no fans would be able to attend the men's and women's 2020 NCAA tournament games due to concerns about the outbreak of COVID-19. A number of college conferences followed suit by either cancelling their basketball tournaments entirely or limiting spectator attendance.

On March 12, the Big Ten announced the cancellation of the remainder of the tournament.

The NCAA further announced that all remaining winter and spring championships for both men's and women's sports were canceled due to the pandemic.

== Seeds ==
All 14 Big Ten schools were scheduled to participate in the tournament. Teams were seeded by conference record, with a tiebreaker system used to seed teams with identical conference records. The top 10 teams received a first round bye and the top four teams received a double bye. Tiebreaking procedures remained unchanged from the 2019 tournament.

Seed	School	Conf.	Tiebreak 1	Tiebreak 2
1	Wisconsin	14–6	2–1 vs. Michigan State/Maryland	
2	Michigan State	14–6	2–2 vs. Wisconsin/Maryland	
3	Maryland	14–6	1–2 vs. Wisconsin/Michigan State	
4	Illinois	13–7		
5	Iowa	11–9	3–1 vs. Ohio State/Penn State/Rutgers	
6	Penn State	11–9	3–3 vs. Iowa/Ohio State/Rutgers	2–2 vs. Wisconsin/Michigan State/Maryland
7	Ohio State	11–9	2–2 vs. Iowa/Penn State/Rutgers	1–4 vs. Wisconsin/Michigan State/Maryland
8	Rutgers	11–9	1–3 vs. Iowa/Penn State/Ohio State	
9	Michigan	10–10		
10	Purdue	9–11	2–0 vs. Indiana	
11	Indiana	9–11	0–2 vs. Purdue	
12	Minnesota	8–12		
13	Northwestern	3–17		
14	Nebraska	2–18		

== Schedule ==
Session	Game	Time*	Matchup^{#}	Television	Attendance	Score
First round – Wednesday, March 11
1	1	6:00 pm	No. 13 Northwestern vs. No. 12 Minnesota	BTN		57–74
1	2	8:30 pm	No. 14 Nebraska vs. No. 11 Indiana	BTN		64–89
Second round – Thursday, March 12
2	3	12:00 pm	No. 9 Michigan vs. No. 8 Rutgers	BTN	Cancelled	
2	4	2:30 pm	No. 12 Minnesota vs. No. 5 Iowa	BTN	Cancelled	
3	5	6:30 pm	No. 10 Purdue vs. No. 7 Ohio State	BTN	Cancelled	
3	6	9:00 pm	No. 11 Indiana vs. No. 6 Penn State	BTN	Cancelled	
Quarterfinals – Friday, March 13
4	7	12:00 pm	Game 3 winner vs. No. 1 Wisconsin	BTN	Cancelled	
4	8	2:30 pm	Game 4 winner vs. No. 4 Illinois	BTN	Cancelled	
5	9	6:30 pm	Game 5 winner vs. No. 2 Michigan State	BTN	Cancelled	
5	10	9:00 pm	Game 6 winner vs. No. 3 Maryland	BTN	Cancelled	
Semifinals – Saturday, March 14
6	11	1:00 pm	Game 7 winner vs. Game 8 winner	CBS	Cancelled	
6	12	3:30 pm	Game 9 winner vs. Game 10 winner	CBS	Cancelled	
Championship – Sunday, March 15
7	13	3:30 pm	Game 11 winner vs. Game 12 winner	CBS	Cancelled	

*Game times in Eastern Time. #Rankings denote tournament seeding.

== Bracket ==
First round Wednesday, March 11; BTN
12	Minnesota	72
13	Northwestern	57
11	Indiana	89
14	Nebraska	64

Second round Thursday, March 12; BTN
8	Rutgers
9	Michigan
5	Iowa
12	Minnesota
7	Ohio State
10	Purdue
6	Penn State
11	Indiana

Quarterfinals; Friday, March 13; BTN
1	Wisconsin
4	Illinois
2	Michigan State
3	Maryland

Semifinals; Saturday, March 14; CBS

Championship; Sunday, March 15; CBS

== Game summaries ==
=== First round ===
BTN

March 11
6:00 pm

No. 12 Minnesota 74, No. 13 Northwestern 57
Scoring by half: 29-31, 45-26
Pts: D. Oturu 24; Rebs: A. Demir 8, D. Oturu 8 Asts: M. Carr 5	Pts: P. Nance 15; Rebs: R. Young 8 Asts: P. Nance 3, R. Spencer 3

Bankers Life Fieldhouse
Indianapolis, IN

BTN

March 11
8:30 pm

No. 11 Indiana 89, No. 14 Nebraska 64
Scoring by half: 43-34, 46-30
Pts: A. Franklin 13; Rebs: T. Jackson-Davis 17; Asts: R. Phinisee 7	Pts: K. Cross 23; Rebs: K. Cross 9 Asts: J. Green 4

Bankers Life Fieldhouse
Indianapolis, IN

== See also ==
2020 Big Ten Conference women's basketball tournament
