= 2019–20 Northwestern Wildcats men's basketball team =

American college basketball season

2019–20 Northwestern Wildcats men's basketball
- Conference: Big Ten Conference
- Record: 8–23 (3–17 Big Ten)
- Head coach: Chris Collins (7th season)
- Assistant coaches: Brian James; Emanuel Dildy; Jon Borovich
- Home arena: Welsh–Ryan Arena

2019–20 Big Ten Conference men's basketball standings
	Conf.				Overall
Team	W		L	PCT	W		L	PCT
No. 17 Wisconsin	14	–	6	.700	21	–	10	.677
No. 9 Michigan State	14	–	6	.700	22	–	9	.710
No. 12 Maryland	14	–	6	.700	24	–	7	.774
No. 21 Illinois	13	–	7	.650	21	–	10	.677
No. 25 Iowa	11	–	9	.550	20	–	11	.645
Penn State	11	–	9	.550	21	–	10	.677
No. 19 Ohio State	11	–	9	.550	21	–	10	.677
Rutgers	11	–	9	.550	20	–	11	.645
Michigan	10	–	10	.500	19	–	12	.613
Purdue	9	–	11	.450	16	–	15	.516
Indiana	9	–	11	.450	20	–	12	.625
Minnesota	8	–	12	.400	15	–	16	.484
Northwestern	3	–	17	.150	8	–	23	.258
Nebraska	2	–	18	.100	7	–	25	.219
The 2020 Big Ten tournament was canceled prior to the second round due to the COVID-19 pandemic. Rankings from AP poll

The 2019–20 Northwestern Wildcats men's basketball team represented Northwestern University in the 2019–20 NCAA Division I men's basketball season. Led by seventh-year head coach Chris Collins, the Wildcats played their home games at Welsh-Ryan Arena in Evanston, Illinois as members of the Big Ten Conference. They finished the season 8–22, 3–17 to finish in 13th place in Big Ten play. They lost in the first round of the Big Ten tournament to Minnesota.

== Previous season ==
The Wildcats finished the 2018–19 season 13–19, 4–16 in Big Ten play to finish in last place. They lost in the first round of the Big Ten tournament to Illinois.

== Offseason ==
=== Coaching changes ===
In March 2019, assistant Billy Donlon was hired as the new head coach at Kansas City. Collins hired Jon Borovich as Donlon's replacement in May 2019.

=== Departures ===
Name	Number	Pos.	Height	Weight	Year	Hometown	Reason for departure
Vic Law	4	F	6'7"	200	Senior (RS)	South Holland, IL	Graduated
Dererk Pardon	5	F/C	6'8"	235	Senior	Cleveland, OH	Graduated
Ryan Taylor	14	G	6'6"	195	Senior (RS)	Gary, IN	Graduated
Jordan Ash	23	G	6'3"	200	Senior	Bolingbrook, IL	Graduate transferred to Wright State
Barret Benson	25	C	6'10"	240	Junior	Chicago, IL	Graduate transferred to Southern Illinois
Charlie Hall	34	G	6'5"	210	Junior (RS)	Los Angeles, CA	Graduated; chose to enter the workforce
Aaron Falzon	35	F	6'8"	235	Junior (RS)	Newton, MA	Graduate transferred to Quinnipiac

=== Incoming transfers ===
Name	Number	Pos.	Height	Weight	Year	Hometown	Remaining Seasons	Previous School	Notes
Chase Audige	1	G	6'4"	193	Freshman	Coram, NY	3	William & Mary	Sat out the 2019–20 season due to NCAA transfer rules.
Pat Spencer	12	G	6'3"	205	Graduate	Davidsonville, MD	1	Loyola (MD)	Was immediately eligible for the 2019–20 season, having graduated from Loyola University Maryland. Eligible to play basketball because he never played that sport while at Loyola, instead playing lacrosse.

=== 2019 recruiting class ===
College recruiting information
Name	Hometown	School	Height	Weight	Commit date
Robbie Beran; PF	Richmond, VA	Collegiate School	6 ft 9 in (2.06 m)	215 lb (98 kg)	Oct 1, 2018
Robbie Beran; PF	Recruit ratings: Scout: Rivals: 247Sports: ESPN:				
Jared Jones; C	Jacksonville, FL	McEachern High School	6 ft 9 in (2.06 m)	232 lb (105 kg)	Sep 30, 2018
Jared Jones; C	Recruit ratings: Scout: Rivals: 247Sports: ESPN:				
Daniel Buie; PG	Troy, NY	Gould Academy	6 ft 2 in (1.88 m)	170 lb (77 kg)	Sep 14, 2018
Daniel Buie; PG	Recruit ratings: Scout: Rivals: 247Sports: ESPN:				
Overall recruit ranking:
Note: In many cases, Scout, Rivals, 247Sports, On3, and ESPN may conflict in their listings of height and weight.; In these cases, the average was taken. ESPN grades are on a 100-point scale.; Sources: "2019 Northwestern Commits". Rivals.; "2019 Team Ranking". Rivals.

== Roster ==
2019–20 Northwestern Wildcats men's basketball team
Players
Coaches

Pos.	#	Name	Height	Weight	Year	Previous school	Hometown
G	0	Boo Buie	6 ft 2 in (1.88 m)	180 lb (82 kg)	Fr	Gould Academy	Albany, NY
G	1	Chase Audige (redshirt)	6 ft 4 in (1.93 m)	200 lb (91 kg)	Fr	The Hill School (PA); William & Mary	Coram, NY
G	2	Ryan Greer	6 ft 2 in (1.88 m)	185 lb (84 kg)	So	Northfield Mount Hermon	Atlanta, GA
F	4	Jared Jones	6 ft 10 in (2.08 m)	240 lb (109 kg)	Fr	McEachern HS	Hiram, GA
F	10	Miller Kopp	6 ft 7 in (2.01 m)	210 lb (95 kg)	So	Houston Christian HS	Houston, TX
G	11	Anthony Gaines	6 ft 4 in (1.93 m)	205 lb (93 kg)	Jr	New Hampton School	Kingston, NY
G	12	Pat Spencer	6 ft 3 in (1.91 m)	205 lb (93 kg)	GS	Loyola (MD)	Davidsonville, MD
C	15	Ryan Young	6 ft 10 in (2.08 m)	235 lb (107 kg)	RS Fr	Bethlehem Catholic HS	Stewartsville, NJ
F	21	A. J. Turner	6 ft 7 in (2.01 m)	200 lb (91 kg)	RS Sr	Boston College	Mount Clemens, MI
F	22	Pete Nance	6 ft 10 in (2.08 m)	225 lb (102 kg)	So	Revere HS	Akron, OH
F	31	Robbie Beran	6 ft 9 in (2.06 m)	205 lb (93 kg)	Fr	Collegiate School	Richmond, VA
G	33	Tino Malnati	6 ft 3 in (1.91 m)	195 lb (88 kg)	RS Jr	Menomonee Falls HS	Northfield, IL
G	53	Roy Dixon III (W)	5 ft 11 in (1.8 m)	170 lb (77 kg)	Fr	Greater Atlanta Christian School	Atlanta, GA
G	54	Dylan Sandhu (W)	6 ft 4 in (1.93 m)	165 lb (75 kg)	RS Fr	Detroit Country Day School	Northville, MI
G	55	Eric Zalewski (W)	6 ft 0 in (1.83 m)	185 lb (84 kg)	RS So	Stevenson HS	Buffalo Grove, IL

Head coach

- Chris Collins (Duke)

Assistant coach(es)

- Brian James (Illinois State)
- Emanuel Dildy (Eastern Illinois)
- Jon Borovich (Central Michigan)

Legend

- (C) Team captain
- (S) Suspended
- (I) Ineligible
- (W) Walk-on
- Injured
- Current redshirt

Roster
Last update: July 24, 2019

== Schedule and results ==
Date time, TV	Rank^{#}	Opponent^{#}	Result	Record	High points	High rebounds	High assists	Site (attendance) city, state
Exhibition
October 31, 2019*; 7:00 p.m., BTN Plus		Quincy	W 105–64	–	19 – Spencer	8 – Turner	5 – Buie/Turner	Welsh–Ryan Arena (N/A); Evanston, IL
Regular season
November 8, 2019*; 7:00 p.m., BTN Plus		Merrimack	L 61–71	0–1	19 – Nance	12 – Nance	5 – Greeg	Welsh–Ryan Arena (5,014); Evanston, IL
November 13, 2019*; 8:00 p.m., BTN		Providence; Gavitt Tipoff Games	W 72–63	1–1	16 – Young	8 – Nance	5 – Spencer	Welsh–Ryan Arena (5,204); Evanston, IL
November 19, 2019*; 7:00 p.m., BTN Plus		Radford; Fort Myers Tip Off campus site game	L 56–67	1–2	16 – Nance	10 – Nance	6 – Spencer	Welsh–Ryan Arena (4,834); Evanston, IL
November 22, 2019*; 7:00 p.m., BTN Plus		Norfolk State; Fort Myers Tip Off campus site game	W 70–59	2–2	19 – Young	12 – Young	5 – Spencer	Welsh–Ryan Arena (4,954); Evanston, IL
November 25, 2019*; 7:30 p.m., FS1		vs. Bradley; Fort Myers Tip Off semifinals	W 78–51	3–2	23 – Spencer	9 – Gaines	8 – Spencer	Suncoast Credit Union Arena (2,286); Fort Myers, FL
November 27, 2019*; 7:30 p.m., FS1		vs. Pittsburgh; Fort Myers Tip Off Finals	L 59–72	3–3	18 – Spencer	5 – Jones	3 – Spencer	Suncoast Credit Union Arena (2,046); Fort Myers, FL
December 3, 2019*; 7:00 p.m., ESPNU		at Boston College; ACC–Big Ten Challenge	W 82–64	4–3	20 – Tied	6 – Nance	4 – Nance	Conte Forum (4,004); Chestnut Hill, MA
December 8, 2019; 4:00 p.m., BTN		at Purdue	L 44–58	4–4 (0–1)	14 – Nance	7 – Young	3 – Young	Mackey Arena (14,804); West Lafayette, IN
December 15, 2019*; 3:00 p.m., ESPNU		SIU Edwardsville	W 72–54	5–4	25 – Young	12 – Young	6 – Buie	Welsh–Ryan Arena (5,464); Evanston, IL
December 18, 2019; 7:00 p.m., BTN		No. 15 Michigan State	L 72–77	5–5 (0–2)	26 – Buie	7 – Tied	4 – Buie	Welsh–Ryan Arena (6,734); Evanston, IL
December 21, 2019*; 7:30 p.m., CBSSN		at DePaul	L 78–83	5–6	25 – Buie	11 – Young	6 – Buie	Wintrust Arena (6,357); Chicago, IL
December 29, 2019*; 1:00 p.m., BTN		Hartford	L 66–67	5–7	24 – Kopp	5 – Nance	6 – Buie	Welsh–Ryan Arena (5,304); Evanston, IL
January 5, 2020; 6:30 p.m., BTN		at Minnesota	L 68–77	5–8 (0–3)	22 – Spencer	9 – Young	8 – Spencer	Williams Arena (9,574); Minneapolis, MN
January 8, 2020; 6:00 p.m., BTN		at Indiana	L 62–66	5–9 (0–4)	15 – Spencer	5 – Young	5 – Spencer	Simon Skjodt Assembly Hall (13,751); Bloomington, IN
January 11, 2020; 3:30 p.m., BTN		Nebraska	W 62–57	6–9 (1–4)	15 – Kopp	10 – Beran	4 – Nance	Welsh–Ryan Arena (5,664); Evanston, IL
January 14, 2020; 7:00 p.m., BTN		Iowa	L 62–75	6–10 (1–5)	15 – Kopp	10 – Nance	4 – Tied	Welsh–Ryan Arena (6,023); Evanston, IL
January 18, 2020; 4:00 p.m., BTN		at No. 24 Illinois	L 71–75	6–11 (1–6)	17 – Beran	5 – Tied	5 – Spencer	State Farm Center (14,131); Champaign, IL
January 21, 2020; 6:00 p.m., FS1		No. 17 Maryland	L 66–77	6–12 (1–7)	17 – Spencer	9 – Spencer	4 – Turner	Welsh–Ryan Arena (5,236); Evanston, IL
January 26, 2020; 5:30 p.m., BTN		Ohio State	L 59–71	6–13 (1–8)	20 – Kopp	6 – Nance	4 – Spencer	Welsh–Ryan Arena (6,121); Evanston, IL
January 29, 2020; 5:30 p.m., BTN		at No. 14 Michigan State	L 50–79	6–14 (1–9)	11 – Spencer	6 – Beran	2 – Tied	Breslin Student Events Center (14,797); East Lansing, MI
February 1, 2020; 8:00 p.m., BTN		Purdue	L 58–61	6–15 (1–10)	15 – Kopp	7 – Spencer	4 – Buie	Welsh–Ryan Arena (5,874); Evanston, IL
February 9, 2020; 5:30 p.m., BTN		at Rutgers	L 73–77 ^{OT}	6–16 (1–11)	19 – Buie	6 – Young	5 – Spencer	Louis Brown Athletic Center (8,000); Piscataway, NJ
February 12, 2020; 8:00 p.m., BTN		Michigan	L 54–79	6–17 (1–12)	12 – Jones	8 – Young	4 – Tied	Welsh–Ryan Arena (6,054); Evanston, IL
February 15, 2020; 11:00 a.m., BTN		at No. 13 Penn State	L 61–77	6–18 (1–13)	12 – Tied	7 – Tied	4 – Kopp	Bryce Jordan Center (14,402); University Park, PA
February 18, 2020; 7:00 p.m., BTN		at No. 7 Maryland	L 67–76	6–19 (1–14)	17 – Young	8 – Young	3 – Tied	Xfinity Center (15,486); College Park, MD
February 23, 2020; 2:00 p.m., BTN		Minnesota	L 57–83	6–20 (1–15)	11 – Nance	5 – Kopp	6 – Spencer	Welsh–Ryan Arena (5,815); Evanston, IL
February 27, 2020; 7:00 p.m., BTN		Illinois	L 66–74	6–21 (1–16)	18 – Spencer	7 – Nance	3 – Spencer	Welsh-Ryan Arena (7,039); Evanston, IL
March 1, 2020; 3:15 p.m., BTN		at Nebraska	W 81–76	7–21 (2–16)	21 – Kopp	14 – Nance	7 – Buie	Pinnacle Bank Arena (15,842); Lincoln, NE
March 4, 2020; 8:00 p.m., BTN		at No. 24 Wisconsin	L 48–63	7–22 (2–17)	14 – Nance	8 – Spencer	7 – Spencer	Kohl Center (17,287); Madison, WI
March 7, 2020; 3:00 p.m., BTN		No. 20 Penn State	W 80–69	8–22 (3–17)	21 – Kopp	8 – Young	6 – Spencer	Welsh–Ryan Arena (6,084); Evanston, IL
Big Ten tournament
March 11, 2020; 5:00 pm, BTN	(13)	vs. (12) Minnesota; First Round	L 57–74	8–23	15 – Nance	8 – Tied	3 – Tied	Bankers Life Fieldhouse; Indianapolis, IN
*Non-conference game. ^{#}Rankings from AP Poll. (#) Tournament seedings in parentheses. All times are in Central Time.
