= 2019–20 Maryland Terrapins men's basketball team =

American college basketball season

2019–20 Maryland Terrapins men's basketball
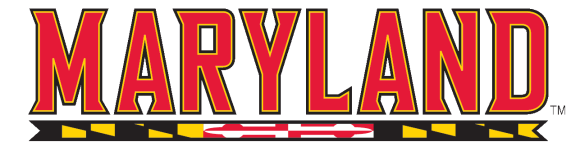

Orlando Invitational champions Big Ten regular season co-champions
- Conference: Big Ten Conference

Ranking
- Coaches: No. 11
- AP: No. 12
- Record: 24–7 (14–6 Big Ten)
- Head coach: Mark Turgeon (9th season)
- Assistant coaches: DeAndre Haynes; Matt Brady; Bino Ranson
- Home arena: Xfinity Center

2019–20 Big Ten Conference men's basketball standings
	Conf.				Overall
Team	W		L	PCT	W		L	PCT
No. 17 Wisconsin	14	–	6	.700	21	–	10	.677
No. 9 Michigan State	14	–	6	.700	22	–	9	.710
No. 12 Maryland	14	–	6	.700	24	–	7	.774
No. 21 Illinois	13	–	7	.650	21	–	10	.677
No. 25 Iowa	11	–	9	.550	20	–	11	.645
Penn State	11	–	9	.550	21	–	10	.677
No. 19 Ohio State	11	–	9	.550	21	–	10	.677
Rutgers	11	–	9	.550	20	–	11	.645
Michigan	10	–	10	.500	19	–	12	.613
Purdue	9	–	11	.450	16	–	15	.516
Indiana	9	–	11	.450	20	–	12	.625
Minnesota	8	–	12	.400	15	–	16	.484
Northwestern	3	–	17	.150	8	–	23	.258
Nebraska	2	–	18	.100	7	–	25	.219
The 2020 Big Ten tournament was canceled prior to the second round due to the COVID-19 pandemic. Rankings from AP poll

The 2019–20 Maryland Terrapins men's basketball team represented the University of Maryland, College Park in the 2019–20 NCAA Division I men's basketball season. They were led by ninth-year head coach Mark Turgeon and played their home games at Xfinity Center in College Park, Maryland, as members of the Big Ten Conference.

With a win over Michigan on March 8, 2020, the Terrapins earned a share of their first-ever Big Ten regular season championship. They finished the season 24–7, 14–6 in Big Ten play to finish in a three-way tie for first place. Their season ended following the cancellation of postseason tournaments due to the coronavirus pandemic.

== Previous season ==
The Terrapins finished the 2018–19 season 23–11, 13–7 in Big Ten play to finish in fifth place. They lost in the second round of the Big Ten tournament to Nebraska. They received an at-large bid to the NCAA tournament as the No. 6 seed in the East region. There they defeated Belmont before losing to LSU in the second round.

== Offseason ==
=== Coaching changes ===
In May 2019, assistant Kevin Broadus was hired as the new head coach at Morgan State. Turgeon hired DeAndre Haynes as Broadus' replacement in June 2019.

=== Departures ===
Name	Number	Pos.	Height	Weight	Year	Hometown	Reason for departure
Andrew Terrell	4	G	5'10"	190	Senior	Indianapolis, IN	Walk-on; graduated
Ivan Bender	13	F	6'9"	235	Senior	Čapljina, Bosnia and Herzegovina	Graduated
Bruno Fernando	23	F	6'10"	245	Sophomore	Luanda, Angola	Declared for the 2019 NBA draft; selected 34th overall by the Philadelphia 76ers.
Trace Ramsey	24	F	6'7"	200	Freshman	Valparaiso, IN	Transferred to UC San Diego

=== Recruiting classes ===
==== 2019 recruiting class ====
College recruiting
Name	Hometown	School	Height	Weight	Commit date
Hakim Hart; SG	Philadelphia, PA	Roman Catholic	6 ft 5 in (1.96 m)	185 lb (84 kg)	Apr 18, 2019
Hakim Hart; SG	Recruit ratings: Scout: Rivals: 247Sports: ESPN:				
Chol Marial; C	Rumbek, South Sudan	Compass Prep	7 ft 2 in (2.18 m)	230 lb (100 kg)	May 6, 2019
Chol Marial; C	Recruit ratings: Scout: Rivals: 247Sports:				
Makhi Mitchell; C	Washington, D.C.	Woodrow Wilson High School	6 ft 9 in (2.06 m)	215 lb (98 kg)	Aug 4, 2017
Makhi Mitchell; C	Recruit ratings: Scout: Rivals: 247Sports: ESPN:				
Makhel Mitchell; C	Washington, D.C.	Woodrow Wilson High School	6 ft 9 in (2.06 m)	225 lb (102 kg)	Aug 4, 2017
Makhel Mitchell; C	Recruit ratings: Scout: Rivals: 247Sports: ESPN:				
Donta Scott; SF	Philadelphia, PA	Imhotep Institute	6 ft 7 in (2.01 m)	200 lb (91 kg)	Oct 24, 2018
Donta Scott; SF	Recruit ratings: Scout: Rivals: 247Sports: ESPN:				
Overall recruit ranking:
Note: In many cases, Scout, Rivals, 247Sports, On3, and ESPN may conflict in their listings of height and weight.; In these cases, the average was taken. ESPN grades are on a 100-point scale.; Sources: "2019 Maryland Commits". Rivals.; "2019 Team Ranking". Rivals.

==== 2020 Recruiting class ====
College recruiting (2020)
Name	Hometown	School	Height	Weight	Commit date
Marcus Dockery; PG	Washington, DC	Bishop O'Connell High School	6 ft 1 in (1.85 m)	160 lb (73 kg)	Oct 18, 2018
Marcus Dockery; PG	Recruit ratings: Scout: Rivals: 247Sports: ESPN:				
Overall recruit ranking:
Note: In many cases, Scout, Rivals, 247Sports, On3, and ESPN may conflict in their listings of height and weight.; In these cases, the average was taken. ESPN grades are on a 100-point scale.; Sources: "2020 Maryland Commits". Rivals.; "2020 Team Ranking". Rivals.

== Roster ==
2019–20 Maryland Terrapins men's basketball team
Players
Coaches

Pos.	#	Name	Height	Weight	Year	Previous school	Hometown
F	0	Joshua Tomaic	6 ft 10 in (2.08 m)	235 lb (107 kg)	RS Jr	Canarias Basketball Academy	Lanzarote, Canary Islands
G	1	Anthony Cowan Jr.	6 ft 0 in (1.83 m)	180 lb (82 kg)	Sr	St. John's College HS	Bowie, Maryland
G	2	Aaron Wiggins	6 ft 6 in (1.98 m)	200 lb (91 kg)	So	Wesleyan Christian Academy	Greensboro, North Carolina
F	4	Ricky Lindo Jr.	6 ft 8 in (2.03 m)	220 lb (100 kg)	So	Woodrow Wilson HS	Washington, D.C.
G	5	Eric Ayala	6 ft 5 in (1.96 m)	195 lb (88 kg)	So	IMG Academy	Wilmington, Delaware
G	10	Serrel Smith Jr.	6 ft 4 in (1.93 m)	175 lb (79 kg)	So	St. Petersburg HS	St. Petersburg, Florida
G	11	Darryl Morsell	6 ft 5 in (1.96 m)	200 lb (91 kg)	Jr	Mount Saint Joseph HS	Baltimore, Maryland
G	12	Reese Mona (W)	6 ft 2 in (1.88 m)	180 lb (82 kg)	Jr	St. John's College HS	La Plata, Maryland
G	13	Hakim Hart	6 ft 6 in (1.98 m)	200 lb (91 kg)	Fr	Roman Catholic HS	Philadelphia, Pennsylvania
F	14	Will Clark (W)	6 ft 8 in (2.03 m)	195 lb (88 kg)	Sr	Loyola Blakefield	Baltimore, Maryland
C	15	Chol Marial	7 ft 2 in (2.18 m)	230 lb (104 kg)	Fr	AZ Compass Prep	Rumbek, South Sudan
G	20	Travis Valmon (W)	6 ft 1 in (1.85 m)	190 lb (86 kg)	Sr	Georgetown Prep	Rockville, Maryland
F	24	Donta Scott	6 ft 7 in (2.01 m)	225 lb (102 kg)	Fr	Imhotep Charter HS	Philadelphia, Pennsylvania
F	25	Jalen Smith	6 ft 10 in (2.08 m)	225 lb (102 kg)	So	Mount Saint Joseph HS	Baltimore, Maryland

Head coach

- Mark Turgeon (Kansas)

Assistant coach(es)

- Bino Ranson (Southern New Hampshire)
- Matt Brady (Siena)
- DeAndre Haynes (Kent State)

Legend

- (C) Team captain
- (S) Suspended
- (I) Ineligible
- (W) Walk-on
- Injured
- Current redshirt

Roster

=== Depth chart ===
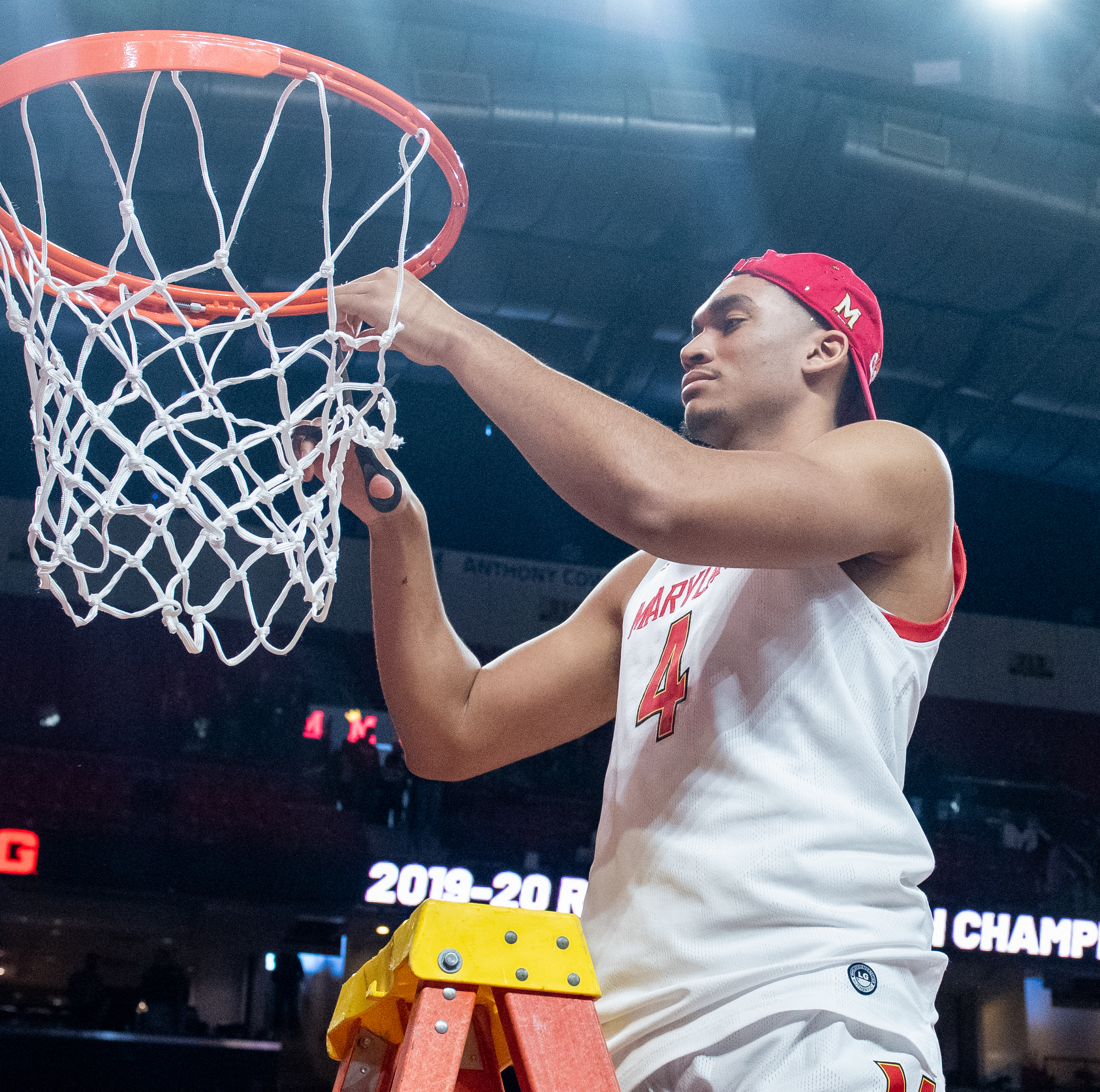
Ricky Lindo cutting down the net for Maryland, March 2020

Pos.	Starting 5	Bench 1	Bench 2
C	Jalen Smith	Chol Marial	Joshua Tomaic
PF	Donta Scott	Ricky Lindo Jr.	Will Clark
SF	Darryl Morsell	Hakim Hart
SG	Eric Ayala	Aaron Wiggins	Reese Mona
PG	Anthony Cowan Jr.	Serrel Smith Jr.	Travis Valmon

- Makhi and Makhel Mitchell entered the transfer portal in December 2019, leaving the team.

== Schedule and results ==
Date time, TV	Rank^{#}	Opponent^{#}	Result	Record	High points	High rebounds	High assists	Site (attendance) city, state
Exhibition
November 1, 2019*; 7:30 p.m., BTN Plus	No. 7	Fayetteville State	W 76–43	–	16 – Cowan Jr.	8 – Makhi Mitchell	3 – Morsell/Smith	Xfinity Center (N/A); College Park, MD
Regular season
November 5, 2019*; 7:30 p.m., BTN Plus	No. 7	Holy Cross	W 95–71	1–0	16 – Smith	11 – Smith	5 – Cowan Jr.	Xfinity Center (13,633); College Park, MD
November 9, 2019*; 9:00 p.m., FS1	No. 7	Rhode Island	W 73–55	2–0	19 – Smith	13 – Wiggins	5 – Cowan Jr.	Xfinity Center (14,263); College Park, MD
November 16, 2019*; 12:00 p.m., BTN Plus	No. 7	Oakland	W 80–50	3–0	14 – Morsell	7 – Tied	7 – Cowan Jr.	Xfinity Center (12,989); College Park, MD
November 19, 2019*; 8:30 p.m., BTN	No. 6	Fairfield	W 74–55	4–0	17 – Smith	8 – Smith	5 – Cowan Jr.	Xfinity Center (11,412); College Park, MD
November 22, 2019*; 7:00 p.m., BTN	No. 6	George Mason	W 86–63	5–0	16 – Cowan Jr.	10 – Smith	3 – Ayala	Xfinity Center (14,499); College Park, MD
November 28, 2019*; 11:00 am, ESPN2	No. 5	vs. Temple; Orlando Invitational quarterfinals	W 76–69	6–0	30 – Cowan Jr.	9 – Smith	4 – Cowan Jr.	HP Field House (2,014); Bay Lake, FL
November 29, 2019*; 11:30 am, ESPN2	No. 5	vs. Harvard; Orlando Invitational semifinals	W 80–73	7–0	20 – Cowan Jr.	12 – Morsell	5 – Cowan Jr.	HP Field House (2,014); Bay Lake, FL
December 1, 2019*; 1:00 pm, ESPN	No. 5	vs. Marquette; Orlando Invitational championship	W 84–63	8–0	22 – Cowan Jr.	10 – Morsell	4 – Cowan Jr.	HP Field House (2,439); Bay Lake, FL
December 4, 2019*; 7:30 p.m., ESPN	No. 3	Notre Dame; ACC–Big Ten Challenge	W 72–51	9–0	15 – Smith	17 – Smith	5 – Ayala	Xfinity Center (15,529); College Park, MD
December 7, 2019; 5:00 p.m., ESPN2	No. 3	Illinois	W 59–58	10–0 (1–0)	20 – Cowan Jr.	13 – Smith	6 – Cowan Jr.	Xfinity Center (16,690); College Park, MD
December 10, 2019; 7:00 p.m., ESPN2	No. 4	at Penn State	L 69–76	10–1 (1–1)	16 – Cowan Jr.	11 – Smith	3 – Cowan Jr.	Bryce Jordan Center (8,643); University Park, PA
December 19, 2019*; 7:00 p.m., FS1	No. 7	at Seton Hall	L 48–52	10–2	16 – Cowan Jr.	9 – Smith	6 – Cowan Jr.	Prudential Center (13,313); Newark, NJ
December 29, 2019*; 12:00 p.m., BTN	No. 13	Bryant	W 84–70	11–2	19 – Cowan Jr.	10 – Smith	5 – Morsell	Xfinity Center (14,777); College Park, MD
January 4, 2020; 12:00 p.m., FOX	No. 15	Indiana	W 75–59	12–2 (2–1)	19 – Smith	8 – Tied	6 – Cowan Jr.	Xfinity Center (16,631); College Park, MD
January 7, 2020; 7:00 p.m., ESPN	No. 12	No. 11 Ohio State	W 67–55	13–2 (3–1)	20 – Cowan Jr.	7 – Smith	4 – Ayala	Xfinity Center (16,192); College Park, MD
January 10, 2020; 7:00 p.m., FS1	No. 12	at Iowa	L 49–67	13–3 (3–2)	13 – Smith	6 – Morsell	3 – Cowan Jr.	Carver–Hawkeye Arena (11,721); Iowa City, IA
January 14, 2020; 9:00 p.m., ESPN2	No. 17	at Wisconsin	L 54–56	13–4 (3–3)	18 – Smith	9 – Smith	3 – Cowan Jr.	Kohl Center (16,157); Madison, WI
January 18, 2020; 2:00 p.m., ESPN2	No. 17	Purdue	W 57–50	14–4 (4–3)	18 – Smith	10 – Smith	7 – Cowan Jr.	Xfinity Center (16,099); College Park, MD
January 21, 2020; 7:00 p.m., FS1	No. 17	at Northwestern	W 77–66	15–4 (5–3)	25 – Smith	11 – Smith	6 – Cowan Jr.	Welsh–Ryan Arena (5,236); Evanston, IL
January 26, 2020; 1:00 p.m., CBS	No. 17	at Indiana	W 77–76	16–4 (6–3)	29 – Smith	11 – Smith	6 – Ayala	Simon Skjodt Assembly Hall (17,222); Bloomington, IN
January 30, 2020; 8:30 p.m., BTN	No. 15	No. 18 Iowa	W 82–72	17–4 (7–3)	31 – Cowan Jr.	14 – Smith	6 – Cowan Jr.	Xfinity Center (16,369); College Park, MD
February 4, 2020; 7:00 p.m., FS1	No. 9	Rutgers	W 56–51	18–4 (8–3)	17 – Cowan Jr.	15 – Smith	4 – Ayala	Xfinity Center (15,855); College Park, MD
February 7, 2020; 8:00 p.m., FS1	No. 9	at No. 20 Illinois	W 75–66	19–4 (9–3)	20 – Cowan Jr.	12 – Smith	6 – Cowan Jr.	State Farm Center (15,544); Champaign, IL
February 11, 2020; 8:30 p.m., BTN	No. 9	Nebraska	W 72–70	20–4 (10–3)	16 – Tied	13 – Smith	10 – Cowan Jr.	Xfinity Center (14,396); College Park, MD
February 15, 2020; 6:00 p.m., ESPN	No. 9	at Michigan State; ESPN College GameDay	W 67–60	21–4 (11–3)	24 – Cowan Jr.	10 – Smith	6 – Morsell	Breslin Center (14,797); East Lansing, MI
February 18, 2020; 8:00 p.m., BTN	No. 7	Northwestern	W 76–67	22–4 (12–3)	22 – Smith	19 – Smith	7 – Morsell	Xfinity Center (15,486); College Park, MD
February 23, 2020; 4:00 p.m., CBS	No. 7	at No. 25 Ohio State	L 72–79	22–5 (12–4)	20 – Wiggins	7 – Smith	7 – Cowan Jr.	Value City Arena (18,809); Columbus, OH
February 26, 2020; 9:00 p.m., BTN	No. 9	at Minnesota	W 74–73	23–5 (13–4)	16 – Tied	11 – Smith	9 – Cowan Jr.	Williams Arena (9,252); Minneapolis, MN
February 29, 2020; 8:00 p.m., ESPN	No. 9	No. 24 Michigan State; ESPN College GameDay	L 66–78	23–6 (13–5)	20 – Smith	12 – Smith	3 – Tied	Xfinity Center (17,950); College Park, MD
March 3, 2020; 7:00 p.m., BTN	No. 9	at Rutgers	L 67–78	23–7 (13–6)	19 – Cowan Jr.	10 – Smith	4 – Ayala	Louis Brown Athletic Center (8,000); Piscataway, NJ
March 8, 2020; 12:00 p.m., FOX	No. 9	No. 25 Michigan	W 83–70	24–7 (14–6)	20 – Cowan Jr.	11 – Smith	8 – Cowan Jr.	Xfinity Center (17,950); College Park, MD
Big Ten tournament
Cancelled
NCAA Tournament
Cancelled
*Non-conference game. ^{#}Rankings from AP Poll. (#) Tournament seedings in parentheses. All times are in Eastern Time.

== Rankings ==
Ranking movements Legend: ██ Increase in ranking ██ Decrease in ranking ( ) = First-place votes
	Week																			
Poll	Pre	1	2	3	4	5	6	7	8	9	10	11	12	13	14	15	16	17	18	Final
AP	7	7	6	5	3	4	7	13	15	12	17	17	15	9	9	7	9	9	12	12
Coaches	8	8*	7	8 (1)	4	4 (1)	8	12	15	14	17	17	15	9	9	7	8	9	11	11

^Coaches did not release a Week 2 poll.
*AP does not release post-NCAA Tournament rankings
