= PlaySight Interactive =

Sports technology company

- Type: Private
- Industry: Sports software
- Founded: 2010
- Founders: Chen M. Shachar, Evgeni Khazanov
- Headquarters: Boston, Massachusetts
- Website: playsight.com

PlaySight Interactive is a connected camera and artificial intelligence sports technology company, offering its Smart sports video platform for over 25 sports and across 20 countries, including basketball, tennis, ice hockey and soccer. There are over 1000 SmartCourts installed around the world, including with the NBA's Golden State Warriors, Toronto Raptors, Detroit Pistons and Phoenix Suns and over 70 NCAA sports programs, including Harvard University, the University of Southern California, Indiana University, Claremont Colleges, Fairleigh Dickinson University and Princeton University. The United States Tennis Association installed PlaySight's SmartCourt technology on 32 courts at its new national campus in Lake Nona, Florida. PlaySight was named one of Fast Company's Most Innovative Companies for consecutive years in both 2017 and 2018.

== Company history ==
In 2010, PlaySight was founded in Kfar Saba, Israel, using technology with roots in the Israeli military. PlaySight has continued to grow through partnerships and investment from players in the tennis industry including Billie Jean King, Ana Ivanovic, Chris Evert, Pete Sampras, Novak Djokovic, Tommy Haas, Paul Annacone, Darren Cahill, and Mark Ein. Since the technology was commercialized in 2013, the technology has been adapted for numerous other sports including soccer, martial arts, volleyball, squash, handball, gymnastics, dancing, hockey and wrestling. So far, PlaySight has raised over $20 million and now has offices in Kfar Saba, New Jersey and Los Angeles.

In June 2017, Verizon Ventures and golfer Greg Norman announced an $11 million investment in PlaySight to further SmartCourt expansion in tennis, basketball and other sports and to also introduce the technology to golf.

PlaySight installed its first SmartSchool in 2017. A SmartSchool is a fully connected high school, college or university campus (including Trinity-Pawling School, Oaks Christian School and Sierra Canyon School with PlaySight technology across several sports and venues – basketball, ice hockey, soccer and more. To date, there are over 20 SmartSchools across the country at the prep school level alone.

In 2018, PlaySight added new strategic investors, including SoftBank Group's Asia Ventures investment arm, CE Ventures, and Naver Corporation, an Internet content service company headquartered in Seongnam, South Korea that operates the Korean search engine Naver.

== Method of operation ==
PlaySight was the first company to develop advanced artificial intelligence (AI) software for sports that has enabled a pro-level platform to be brought to all levels of athletics. PlaySight makes courts, gyms, fields and rinks 'Smart' by installing its software and connected camera technology. Once set up, SmartCourts provide several benefits to athletes, coaches, teams and fans, from automated HD broadcast live streaming and advanced coaching tools to instant replay video, VAR, and a content platform to store, manage and share video quickly and seamlessly. For tennis, the technology uses image processing and analytical algorithms to track strokes, ball trajectory, player movement and shot speed and spin. PlaySight's SmartCourt system provides players and coaches instant multi-angle video and detailed statistics through the court side kiosk and on tablets and mobile devices. The cloud-based platform allows teams to live stream matches and stores all video from SmartCourt sessions for coaches and players to review later from any web enabled device. In 2017, PlaySight unveiled its SmartField technology for soccer and also released its SmartTracker technology - an autonomous 4K camera that follows all on-court action automatically.

== Automatic Production ==
PlaySight provides each of its clients with automatic production capabilities: automated live streaming and production tools, scoreboard integration and graphic overlays, as well as full tracking of games without the need for a cameraman or operator.

== PlayFair and VAR ==
Cheating has become a prominent issue in tennis particularly on junior circuits where players call their own lines. PlaySight developed the idea of PlayFair Tournaments that use the line-calling feature of PlaySight's SmartCourt technology to tackle the cheating problem in tennis. These tournaments allow players to challenge close line calls and use the PlaySight court side kiosk to access video replay to confirm or overrule the call. PlayFair Tournaments have been organized at both the junior club and collegiate levels.'

In late 2017, PlaySight and the ITA announced an expansion of the PlayFair initiative, bringing the technology to close to 30 NCAA dual matches for the 2018 season.

== Expansion into new sports and markets ==
PlaySight expanded into basketball, volleyball, soccer, and several other sports in 2017. In baseball/softball, PlaySight is partnered with Ripken Baseball and Big League Dreams, bringing live streaming and on demand video to all tournaments in addition to the coaching, analysis and player development technology. In basketball and other court sports, PlaySight works with leading academies and high performance training facilities across the country and world, including Kobe Bryant's Mamba Sports Academy

Purdue University was the first [NCAA] program to add PlaySight back in 2017, and now many programs in college basketball use similar technology in their practices and video analysis - Wake Forest University, the University of Oklahoma, and the University of North Carolina at Chapel Hill. Beyond college and the NBA, many international professional clubs and several NBA G League organizations use PlaySight SmartCourts for training.

In addition to a technology partnership with Tennis Canada, PlaySight technology is used by leading schools in Canada, including McGill University, Acadia University and several other U Sports programs.

== Fast Company ==
In 2017 and 2018, PlaySight was nominated by Fast Company as one of the 10 Most Innovative Companies in Sport. PlaySight's CEO, Chen M. Shachar, was featured in the print publication of the magazine. "The company signaled its intent to transform youth sports last year by announcing SmartSchools, an initiative to install PlaySight tools in existing facilities, and PlayFair, which seeks to remove cheating from junior tennis (and eventually other sports) using technology."

== Partnerships ==
In late 2018, PlaySight signed a partnership deal with the National Junior College Athletic Association, becoming the official autonomous video technology and SmartCourt streaming provider. To date, several National Junior College Athletic Association programs have added PlaySight's Smart AI and connected camera sports video technology, including the College of DuPage and the Mohawk Valley Community College."With the ever-growing need for technology in today's world, the NJCAA is pleased to announce its partnership with such a prominent company in the industry," stated NJCAA President & CEO Dr. Christopher Parker. "PlaySight will help take our student-athletes, member institutions, and the association as a whole to a new, much-anticipated level.

PlaySight is the official broadcast, live streaming, and performance technology partner of Brussels-based Pro Basketball League, operated by the BPL. PlaySight installed its SmartCourt basketball technology in each team’s arena to bring HD live streaming and automated video highlights to fans, something that PBL General Manager Wim Van de Keere said he hopes will increase visibility and elevate interest in the league.

PlaySight is also partnered with NBC Sports Group Sports Engine, with the goal to bring technology to the next generation of athletes at the youth and grassroots level.
