= 2021–22 Michigan Wolverines men's basketball team =

American college basketball season

2021–22 Michigan Wolverines men's basketball

NCAA tournament, Sweet Sixteen
- Conference: Big Ten Conference

Ranking
- Coaches: No. 25
- Record: 19–15 (11–9 Big Ten)
- Head coach: Juwan Howard (3rd season)
- Assistant coaches: Saddi Washington (6th season); Phil Martelli (3rd season); Howard Eisley (3rd season)
- MVP: Hunter Dickinson
- Captain: Eli Brooks
- Home arena: Crisler Center

2021–22 Big Ten Conference men's basketball standings
	Conf.				Overall
Team	W		L	PCT	W		L	PCT
No. 19 Illinois	15	–	5	.750	23	–	10	.697
No. 14 Wisconsin	15	–	5	.750	25	–	8	.758
No. 10 Purdue	14	–	6	.700	29	–	8	.784
Rutgers	12	–	8	.600	18	–	14	.563
No. 16 Iowa †	12	–	8	.600	26	–	10	.722
Ohio State	12	–	8	.600	20	–	12	.625
Michigan State	11	–	9	.550	23	–	13	.639
Michigan	11	–	9	.550	19	–	15	.559
Indiana	9	–	11	.450	21	–	14	.600
Maryland	7	–	13	.350	15	–	17	.469
Penn State	7	–	13	.350	14	–	17	.452
Northwestern	7	–	13	.350	15	–	16	.484
Nebraska	4	–	16	.200	10	–	22	.313
Minnesota	4	–	16	.200	13	–	17	.433
† Conference tournament winner Rankings from AP poll

The 2021–22 Michigan Wolverines men's basketball team represented the University of Michigan during the 2021–22 NCAA Division I men's basketball season. This season marked the program's 106th season and its 105th consecutive year as a member of the Big Ten Conference. The Wolverines, led by third-year head coach Juwan Howard, played their home games for the 55th consecutive year at the Crisler Center in Ann Arbor, Michigan.

== Previous season ==
The Wolverines finished the 2020–21 season 23–5, 14–3 in Big Ten play to its first Big Ten regular season championship since 2014. As the No. 1 seed in the Big Ten tournament, they defeated Maryland in the quarterfinals before losing to Ohio State in the semifinals. The Wolverines received an at-large bid to the NCAA tournament as the No. 1 seed in the East region, where they defeated Texas Southern and LSU to advance to their fourth straight Sweet Sixteen. In the Sweet Sixteen, they defeated Florida State before being upset by No. 11-seeded UCLA in the Elite Eight.

== Offseason ==
=== Departures ===
Due to the COVID-19 pandemic, the NCAA granted an extra year of eligibility for all winter sport athletes. Despite this, seniors Rico Ozuna-Harrison, C. J. Baird, Luke Wilson and Austin Davis announced they would not return to Michigan. On April 7, 2021, Mike Smith declared for the 2021 NBA draft. On April 10, Chaundee Brown declared for the NBA draft with the intention of hiring an agent. On April 16, Isaiah Livers declared for the NBA draft. On May 4, Franz Wagner declared for the draft.

Michigan Departures
Name	Number	Pos.	Height	Weight	Year	Hometown	Reason for departure
Isaiah Livers	2	F	6'7"	230	Sr	Kalamazoo, MI	Declared for NBA draft
Mike Smith	12	G	5'11"	185	GS	Burr Ridge, IL	Declared for NBA draft
Rico Ozuna-Harrison	14	G	5'11"	175	Sr	Detroit, MI	Graduated
Chaundee Brown	15	G	6'5"	215	Sr	Orlando, FL	Declared for NBA draft
Franz Wagner	21	F	6'9"	220	So	Berlin, Germany	Declared for NBA draft
C. J. Baird	24	F	6'5"	225	Sr	Novi, MI	Graduated
Luke Wilson	32	G	6'0"	175	Sr	Boulder, CO	Graduated
Austin Davis	51	F	6'10"	250	GS	Onsted, MI	Graduated

=== Incoming transfers ===
Incoming transfers
Name	Number	Pos.	Height	Weight	Year	Hometown	Previous School
DeVante' Jones	12	G	6'1"	200	Graduate Student	New Orleans, LA	Coastal Carolina

=== Recruiting classes ===
On June 24, 2020, Michigan received its first class of 2021 commitment from four-star small forward Isaiah Barnes. On July 6, Michigan received its second commitment of the 2021 class, three-star forward Will Tschetter. On July 10, Michigan received its third commitment of the 2021 class, four-star shooting guard Kobe Bufkin. He was ranked No. 63 overall and No. 12 shooting guard. Bufkin became the first in-state prospect to commit to Michigan under head coach Juwan Howard. On August 19, Michigan received its fourth commitment of the 2021 class, four-star point guard Frankie Collins. He was ranked the nation's No. 57 prospect and No. 9 point guard. On October 30, Michigan received its fifth commitment of the 2021 class, five-star forward Caleb Houstan. He was ranked the No. 8 overall prospect in the nation, and No. 2 power forward, becoming Michigan's highest-rated recruit in the 247Sports era. On November 9, Michigan received its sixth commitment of the 2021 class, five-star power forward Moussa Diabaté. He was ranked the No. 20 overall prospect in the nation and No. 6 power forward. Michigan's recruiting class was the top-ranked class in the nation.

==== 2021 recruiting class ====
College recruiting information
Name	Hometown	School	Height	Weight	Commit date
Isaiah Barnes; SF	Chicago, IL	Simeon	6 ft 6 in (1.98 m)	180 lb (82 kg)	Jun 24, 2020
Isaiah Barnes; SF	Recruit ratings: Rivals: 247Sports: ESPN: (81)				
Will Tschetter; PF	Stewartville, MN	Stewartville	6 ft 8 in (2.03 m)	225 lb (102 kg)	Jul 6, 2020
Will Tschetter; PF	Recruit ratings: Rivals: 247Sports: ESPN: (81)				
Kobe Bufkin; SG	Grand Rapids, MI	Grand Rapids Christian	6 ft 4 in (1.93 m)	175 lb (79 kg)	Jul 10, 2020
Kobe Bufkin; SG	Recruit ratings: Rivals: 247Sports: ESPN: (85)				
Frankie Collins; PG	Las Vegas, NV	Coronado	6 ft 1 in (1.85 m)	180 lb (82 kg)	Aug 19, 2020
Frankie Collins; PG	Recruit ratings: Rivals: 247Sports: ESPN: (86)				
Caleb Houstan; SF / PF	Mississauga, Ontario	Montverde Academy (FL)	6 ft 8 in (2.03 m)	205 lb (93 kg)	Oct 30, 2020
Caleb Houstan; SF / PF	Recruit ratings: Rivals: 247Sports: ESPN: (95)				
Moussa Diabaté; PF	Paris, France	IMG Academy (FL)	6 ft 10 in (2.08 m)	215 lb (98 kg)	Nov 9, 2020
Moussa Diabaté; PF	Recruit ratings: Rivals: 247Sports: ESPN: (95)				
Overall recruit ranking: Rivals: 1 247Sports: 1
Note: In many cases, Scout, Rivals, 247Sports, On3, and ESPN may conflict in their listings of height and weight.; In these cases, the average was taken. ESPN grades are on a 100-point scale.; Sources: "Michigan 2021 Basketball Commitments". Rivals.; "2021 Michigan Wolverines Recruiting Class". ESPN.; "2021 Team Ranking". Rivals.

==== 2022 Recruiting class ====
College recruiting information (2022)
Name	Hometown	School	Height	Weight	Commit date
Dug McDaniel; PG	Fairfax, VA	Paul VI Catholic	5 ft 10 in (1.78 m)	155 lb (70 kg)	Jun 17, 2021
Dug McDaniel; PG	Recruit ratings: Rivals: 247Sports: ESPN: (84)				
Tarris Reed; C	Branson, MO	Link Year Prep	6 ft 9 in (2.06 m)	230 lb (100 kg)	Aug 5, 2021
Tarris Reed; C	Recruit ratings: Rivals: 247Sports: ESPN: (88)				
Gregg Glenn III; PF	Fort Lauderdale, FL	Calvary Christian Academy	6 ft 7 in (2.01 m)	215 lb (98 kg)	Oct 5, 2021
Gregg Glenn III; PF	Recruit ratings: Rivals: 247Sports: ESPN: (82)				
Jett Howard; SF	Bradenton, FL	IMG Academy	6 ft 7 in (2.01 m)	220 lb (100 kg)	Oct 13, 2021
Jett Howard; SF	Recruit ratings: Rivals: 247Sports: ESPN: (87)				
Overall recruit ranking: Rivals: 4 247Sports: 3
Note: In many cases, Scout, Rivals, 247Sports, On3, and ESPN may conflict in their listings of height and weight.; In these cases, the average was taken. ESPN grades are on a 100-point scale.; Sources: "Michigan 2022 Basketball Commitments". Rivals.; "2022 Michigan Wolverines Recruiting Class". ESPN.; "2022 Team Ranking". Rivals.

== Roster ==
2021–22 Michigan Wolverines men's basketball team
Players
Coaches

Pos.	#	Name	Height	Weight	Year	Previous school	Hometown
G	0	Adrien Nunez	6 ft 6 in (1.98 m)	220 lb (100 kg)	Sr	St. Thomas More Prep (CT)	Brooklyn, NY
C	1	Hunter Dickinson	7 ft 1 in (2.16 m)	260 lb (118 kg)	So	DeMatha Catholic (MD)	Alexandria, VA
G	2	Kobe Bufkin	6 ft 4 in (1.93 m)	175 lb (79 kg)	Fr	Grand Rapids Christian	Grand Rapids, MI
G	3	Zeb Jackson	6 ft 5 in (1.96 m)	190 lb (86 kg)	So	Montverde Academy (FL)	Toledo, OH
G	4	Brandon Wade (W)	6 ft 1 in (1.85 m)	190 lb (86 kg)	Sr	Skyline	Ann Arbor, MI
F	5	Terrance Williams II	6 ft 7 in (2.01 m)	230 lb (104 kg)	So	Gonzaga College	Clinton, MD
G	10	Frankie Collins	6 ft 1 in (1.85 m)	185 lb (84 kg)	Fr	Coronado	Henderson, NV
G/F	11	Isaiah Barnes	6 ft 7 in (2.01 m)	185 lb (84 kg)	Fr	Simeon Career Academy	Chicago, IL
G	12	DeVante' Jones	6 ft 1 in (1.85 m)	200 lb (91 kg)	GS	Coastal Carolina	New Orleans, LA
G	13	Ian Burns (W)	6 ft 6 in (1.98 m)	200 lb (91 kg)	Fr	New Trier High School	Winnetka, IL
F	14	Moussa Diabaté	6 ft 11 in (2.11 m)	210 lb (95 kg)	Fr	IMG Academy (FL)	Paris, France
G/F	22	Caleb Houstan	6 ft 8 in (2.03 m)	205 lb (93 kg)	Fr	Montverde Academy (FL)	Mississauga, ON
F	23	Brandon Johns Jr.	6 ft 8 in (2.03 m)	240 lb (109 kg)	Sr	East Lansing	East Lansing, MI
G	25	Jace Howard	6 ft 7 in (2.01 m)	225 lb (102 kg)	So	NSU University School	Miami, FL
F	42	Will Tschetter (redshirt)	6 ft 8 in (2.03 m)	230 lb (104 kg)	Fr	Stewartville	Stewartville, MN
F	44	Jaron Faulds (W)	6 ft 10 in (2.08 m)	240 lb (109 kg)	GS	Holt	Holt, MI
G	55	Eli Brooks	6 ft 1 in (1.85 m)	185 lb (84 kg)	GS	Spring Grove Area	Spring Grove, PA

Head coach

Juwan Howard (Michigan)

Assistant coach(es)

- Saddi Washington (Western Michigan)
- Phil Martelli (Widener)
- Howard Eisley (Boston College)

Legend

- (C) Team captain
- (S) Suspended
- (I) Ineligible
- (W) Walk-on
- Injured
- Current redshirt

Roster
Last update: April 1, 2021

== Regular season ==
=== November ===
Michigan began the season on November 10 with an 88–76 victory over the Buffalo Bulls, winning their 19th consecutive season opener. Michigan was led by Hunter Dickinson with 27 points, his sixth career game with 20 or more points, while Terrance Williams II added a career-high 15 points and seven rebounds. On November 13, Michigan defeated Prairie View A&M 77–49. Michigan was led by Eli Brooks with 15 points, while Caleb Houstan added 13 points, and Dickinson added 11 points, including his first career three-pointer, and 10 rebounds, for his seventh career double-double. On November 16, Michigan was upset by Seton Hall 67–65 in the Gavitt Tipoff Games. Michigan was led by Dickinson with a game-high 18 points, and nine rebounds, while Brooks added 17 points, six rebounds and four assists, and DeVante' Jones recorded his 13th career double-double with 11 points and a team-high 12 rebounds. Williams drew a foul with 0.8 seconds remaining and had a chance to tie the game, however, he missed the first foul shot. On November 20, Michigan defeated UNLV 74–61 in the Roman Main Event semifinals. Michigan was led by Brooks with a game-high 22 points, his sixth career game with 20 or more points, while Moussa Diabaté added 14 points, seven rebounds, two blocks and a steal off the bench, and Dickinson added 13 points and seven rebounds. On November 21 Michigan lost to Arizona 80–62 in the Roman Main Event championship game. Michigan was led by Brooks with 14 points, while Dickinson added 11 points and a team-best seven rebounds. On November 24, Michigan defeated Tarleton State 65–54. Michigan was led by Brooks with 15 points, while Diabate added 14 points and seven rebounds, Houstan added 14 points and a career-high 10 rebounds for his first career double-double, and Dickinson added nine points, 10 rebounds, four blocks and three assists, one point shy of a double-double.

=== December ===
On December 1, Michigan lost to North Carolina 72–51 in the ACC–Big Ten Challenge. Michigan was led by Diabaté with 13 points in his first collegiate start, while Brooks added 11 points, six rebounds, three assists and two steals, and Houstan added eight points, and a team-high seven rebounds. On December 4, Michigan defeated San Diego State 72–58. Michigan was led by Dickinson with a game-high 23 points, 14 rebounds, three assists, three steals and a block for his eighth career double-double, while Houstan added a career-high 17 points, five rebounds, two steals and an assist, Brooks posted his eighth consecutive game in double figures with 10 points, and added four rebounds, five assists, three steals and a block, and Frankie Collins came off the bench and added a career-high eight points, four rebounds, three assists and a steal. On December 7, Michigan defeated Nebraska 102–67 in its Big Ten Conference season opener. Michigan was led by Williams with a career-high 22 points, while Johns tied a career-high with 20 points, Houstan added 16 points, Dickinson added 15 points and 12 rebounds for his ninth career double-double, and Brooks added 10 points. Michigan scored over 100 points for the first time since December 6, 2019. The Wolverines made 15 three-pointers, the most since November 17, 2018, when they also made 15 against George Washington. On December 11, Michigan lost to Minnesota 75–65. Michigan was led by Dickinson with 19 points and 10 rebounds, for his third consecutive double-double, while Jones added a season-high 14 points, Brooks added 12 points, his tenth consecutive game in double figures, and Diabate added seven points, 13 rebounds, three assists and two blocks. On December 18, Michigan defeated Southern Utah 87–50. Michigan was led by Dickinson with a game-high 22 points and 10 rebounds, for his fourth consecutive double-double, while Jones added 13 points, and a team-high six assists, and Kobe Bufkin added 11 points off the bench. On December 30, Michigan lost to UCF 85–71. Michigan was led by Brooks with 18 points, while Jones added 17 points, Diabate added 13 points, and Dickinson added 12 points and nine rebounds.

=== January ===
On January 4, Michigan lost to Rutgers 75–67. Michigan was led by Dickinson with 25 points, while Diabaté added 15 points and a team-high nine rebounds, Houstan added 12 points, and Brooks added 11 points. Michigan played without reserves Collins, Faulds, Johns and Williams II due to undisclosed medical reasons, while Jackson didn't make the trip for personal reasons. This marked Rutgers first victory over Michigan in their 15-game series that began on December 20, 1933. After having two games postponed due to COVID-19 complications within the Michigan program, they returned to action on January 14 and lost to (No. 25 AP Poll/No. 24 Coaches Poll) Illinois 68–53. Michigan was without leading scorer Dickinson and Johns Jr. for medical reasons. Michigan was led by Jones with a season-high-tying 17 points, six rebounds and three steals. On January 18, Michigan defeated Maryland 83–64. Michigan was led by Dickinson with 21 points, a team-best six assists and a team-high-tying six rebounds, while Houstan added 16 points, Diabaté added 14 points and Jones add 12 points. On January 23, Michigan defeated Indiana 80–62. Michigan was led by Dickinson with a game-high 25 points, and nine rebounds, finishing one rebound shy of a double-double, while Houstan added a career-high 19 points on a career-best five three pointers, Diabaté added 10 points, and Williams added 10 points off the bench. On January 26, Michigan defeated Northwestern 72–70. Michigan was led by Houstan with a game-high 18 points, his third consecutive game with 15 or more points, while Jones added 15 points and Brooks added 12 points. On January 29, Michigan lost their rivalry game against (No. 10 AP Poll/No. 10 Coaches Poll) Michigan State 83–67. Michigan was led by Dickinson with 25 points, six rebounds and a block, while Diabaté added 11 points and nine rebounds, one rebound shy of a double-double, and Houstan recorded his fourth consecutive double-figure scoring game with 11 points.

=== February ===
On February 1, Michigan defeated Nebraska 85–79. Michigan rallied from a seven-point half-time deficit, and scored the final six points of the game to secure the victory. Michigan was led by Dickinson with a game-high 26 points, with 20 points coming in the second half, while Brooks added 20 points, and Jones added 18 points, six rebounds and two assists. On February 5, Michigan lost to (No. 4 AP Poll/No. 3 Coaches Poll) Purdue 82–76. Michigan was led by Dickinson with a career-high-tying 28 points, his sixth 20+ point game over his last seven games, while Jones added 13 points, four rebounds and four assists, and Houstan added 11 points and three assists. On February 8, Michigan defeated Penn State 58–57. Michigan closed the first half on an 11–0 run to tie the score 34–34 at half-time. Michigan was led by Dickinson with 19 points, and a career-high-tying 15 rebounds for his sixth double-double, while Brooks added 16 points. On February 10, Michigan upset (No. 3 AP Poll/No. 3 Coaches Poll) Purdue 82–58. Michigan was led by Dickinson with a game-high 22 points, while Brooks added 18 points, six rebounds and four assists, Diabaté added a career-high-tying 15 points, Houstan added 14 points and Jones added 11 points, and a career-high-tying 10 assists for his second double-double of the season. Brooks set the Michigan program record for career games played with 147. The win was Michigan's first over a ranked opponent this season, and the highest-ranked opponent Michigan has defeated under head coach Juwan Howard. On February 12, Michigan lost their rivalry game to (No. 16 AP Poll/No. 16 Coaches Poll) Ohio State 68–57. Michigan was led by Brooks with 17 points, while Dickinson added 14 points and seven rebounds, and Jones nearly recorded a triple-double with eight points, 10 rebounds and eight assists. Brooks became the 56th Wolverine in program history to record 1,000 career points. On February 17, Michigan defeated Iowa 84–79. Michigan was led by Diabaté with a career-high 28 points, while Dickinson added 14 points, nine rebounds, and a career-high seven assists, Brooks added 13 points, five assists and four rebounds, and Jones added 11 points and 10 rebounds, five assists and four steals, for his third double-double of the season. On February 20, Michigan lost to (No. 15 AP Poll/No. 16 Coaches Poll) Wisconsin 77–63. Michigan was led by Dickinson with 21 points, while Brooks added 14 points, and Houstan added six points and a career-high 10 rebounds. Following the loss at Wisconsin, tempers flared between Michigan head coach Juwan Howard and Wisconsin head coach Greg Gard in the handshake line. Howard struck a Wisconsin assistant coach in the face, sparking a brawl between Michigan and Wisconsin players. The following day, Big 10 commissioner Kevin Warren suspended Howard for the rest of the regular season and fined him $40,000 for his actions, while Gard was fined $10,000. Three players were also suspended one game for their actions, Diabate and Williams for Michigan, and Jahcobi Neath for Wisconsin. On February 23, Michigan defeated Rutgers 71–62. Michigan was led by Houstan with a career-high 21 points, while Dickinson added 16 points, 11 rebounds, three blocks and two assists for his seventh double-double, Jones added 14 points, seven rebounds and three assists, and Brooks added 11 points. On February 27, Michigan lost to (No. 15 AP Poll/No. 14 Coaches Poll) Illinois 93–85. Michigan was led by Jones with 25 points, and 10 assists for his 16th career double-double, while Houstan added a career-high-tying 21 points, Dickinson added 13 points and 11 rebounds for his eighth double-double of the season, and Diabaté added 12 points.

=== March ===
On March 1, Michigan defeated Michigan State 87–70. Michigan was led by Dickinson with a career-high 33 points, nine rebounds, and a career-high-tying four blocks, while Houstan added 16 points, and Williams recorded a career-high-tying three three-pointers off the bench. On March 3, Michigan lost to (No. 24 AP Poll/No. 25 Coaches Poll) Iowa 82–71. Michigan was led by Dickinson with 21 points, 11 rebounds and four blocks for his tenth double-double of the season, while Brooks added 17 points, Houstan added 11 points and Jones added 10 points and a team-high six assists. On March 6, Michigan defeated (No. 23 AP Poll/No. 25 Coaches Poll) Ohio State 75–69. Michigan was led by Jones with 21 points, while Williams added 17 points off the bench, and Diabaté added seven rebounds and two assists.

== Postseason ==
=== Big Ten tournament ===
On March 10, Michigan opened its 2022 Big Ten men's basketball tournament play with a 74–69 loss to Indiana in the second round. Michigan was led by Jones with 18 points, four rebounds, three assists and two steal, while Brooks added 17 points, four steals, three assists and two rebounds in his 100th career start, and Dickinson added 15 points and five rebounds. Jones surpassed 1,600 career points and 600 rebounds for his collegiate career.

=== NCAA tournament ===
On March 13, Michigan received an at-large bid to the 2022 NCAA tournament as the No. 11 seed in the South Region. On March 17, Michigan begain their participation in the 2022 NCAA tournament with a 75–63 victory over (No. 24 AP Poll) Colorado State in the first round. Michigan was led by Dickinson with a game-high 21 points, six rebounds and four blocks, while Brooks added 16 points, Collins added a career-high 14 points, and Houstan added 13 points. Michigan rallied and overcame a 15-point deficit in the first half, as Colorado State recorded eight consecutive three-pointers on nine Michigan turnovers. Michigan was without starting point guard Jones due to concussion protocol.

On March 19, Michigan defeated (No. 5 AP Poll/No. 8 Coaches Poll) Tennessee 76–68 in the second round to upset the No. 3 seed in the South Region. Michigan was led by Dickinson with 27 points, including 3-of-5 on three-point field goals, 11 rebounds, four assists, a block and a steal, while Brooks added 23 points, and five assists and Diabaté added 13 points and six rebounds. Dickinson and Brooks outscored the entire Tennessee roster in the second half, 33–31. With the win, the Wolverines advanced to the Sweet Sixteen for the fifth consecutive year.

On March 24, Michigan lost to (No. 6 AP Poll/No. 5 Coaches Poll) Villanova 63–55 in the Sweet Sixteen. Michigan was led by Dickinson with 15 points, 15 rebounds, three assists and two blocks, for his second consecutive double-double of the tournament, while Brooks added 14 points, five rebounds, two assists and a steal. Michigan held Villanova to 9-of-30 on three-pointers, however, they struggled themselves, shooting just 21-of-61 from the field. After trailing by as many as nine points in the second half, Michigan reduced the lead to four points during the final 3:30 of the game. The Wolverines could not capitalize on three Villanova turnovers in the final 50 seconds of the game, as they made only one of their final 11 shots.

== Schedule and results ==
Date time, TV	Rank^{#}	Opponent^{#}	Result	Record	High points	High rebounds	High assists	Site (attendance) city, state
Exhibition
November 5, 2021*; 7:00 p.m.	No. 6	at Wayne State	W 87–54	–	14 – Tied	9 – Dickinson	7 – Jones	Wayne State Fieldhouse; Detroit, MI
Regular season
November 10, 2021*; 6:30 p.m., BTN	No. 6	Buffalo	W 88–76	1–0	27 – Dickinson	7 – Williams II	5 – Jones	Crisler Center (12,707); Ann Arbor, MI
November 13, 2021*; 8:00 p.m., BTN	No. 6	vs. Prairie View A&M; Coaches vs. Racism	W 77–49	2–0	15 – Brooks	10 – Dickinson	5 – Jones	Entertainment and Sports Arena (1,476); Washington, DC
November 16, 2021*; 9:00 p.m., FS1	No. 4	Seton Hall; Gavitt Tipoff Games	L 65–67	2–1	18 – Dickinson	12 – Jones	4 – Tied	Crisler Center (12,536); Ann Arbor, MI
November 20, 2021*; 12:30 a.m., ESPN2	No. 4	vs. UNLV; Roman Main Event Semifinals	W 74–61	3–1	22 – Brooks	7 – Tied	8 – Jones	T-Mobile Arena; Paradise, NV
November 21, 2021*; 9:30 p.m., ESPN	No. 4	vs. Arizona; Roman Main Event Championship	L 62–80	3–2	14 – Brooks	7 – Dickinson	2 – Tied	T-Mobile Arena; Paradise, NV
November 24, 2021*; 7:00 p.m., BTN	No. 20	Tarleton State; Roman Main Event On-Campus Game	W 65–54	4–2	15 – Brooks	10 – Tied	4 – Collins	Crisler Center (12,336); Ann Arbor, MI
December 1, 2021*; 9:15 p.m., ESPN	No. 24	at North Carolina; ACC–Big Ten Challenge	L 51–72	4–3	13 – Diabaté	7 – Houstan	3 – Tied	Dean Smith Center (19,938); Chapel Hill, NC
December 4, 2021*; 1:00 p.m., CBS	No. 24	San Diego State	W 72–58	5–3	23 – Dickinson	14 – Dickinson	5 – Brooks	Crisler Center (12,523); Ann Arbor, MI
December 7, 2021; 7:00 p.m., ESPN2		at Nebraska	W 102–67	6–3 (1–0)	22 – Williams II	12 – Dickinson	8 – Jones	Pinnacle Bank Arena (15,426); Lincoln, NE
December 11, 2021; 6:30 p.m., FS1		Minnesota	L 65–75	6–4 (1–1)	19 – Dickinson	13 – Diabaté	3 – Tied	Crisler Center (12,461); Ann Arbor, MI
December 18, 2021*; 7:00 p.m., BTN		Southern Utah	W 87–50	7–4	22 – Dickinson	10 – Dickinson	6 – Jones	Crisler Center (12,445); Ann Arbor, MI
December 21, 2021*; 7:00 p.m., BTN		Purdue Fort Wayne	Cancelled due to COVID-19 complications within Purdue Fort Wayne					Crisler Center; Ann Arbor, MI
December 30, 2021*; 7:00 p.m., ESPN2		at UCF	L 71–85	7–5	18 – Brooks	9 – Dickinson	4 – Brooks	Addition Financial Arena (9,358); Orlando, FL
January 4, 2022; 7:00 p.m., BTN		at Rutgers	L 67–75	7–6 (1–2)	25 – Dickinson	9 – Diabaté	6 – Brooks	Jersey Mike's Arena (8,014); Piscataway, NJ
January 8, 2022; 2:30 p.m., FOX		No. 10 Michigan State; Rivalry	Postponed until March 1 due to COVID-19 complications within Michigan					Crisler Center; Ann Arbor, MI
January 11, 2022; 9:00 p.m., ESPN2		No. 7 Purdue	Postponed until February 10 due to COVID-19 complications within Michigan					Crisler Center; Ann Arbor, MI
January 14, 2022; 9:00 p.m., FS1		at No. 25 Illinois	L 53–68	7–7 (1–3)	17 – Jones	6 – Tied	2 – Collins	State Farm Center (15,544); Champaign, IL
January 18, 2022; 7:00 p.m., ESPN2		Maryland	W 83–64	8–7 (2–3)	21 – Dickinson	6 – Tied	6 – Dickinson	Crisler Center (11,115); Ann Arbor, MI
January 23, 2022; 3:30 p.m., CBS		at Indiana	W 80–62	9–7 (3–3)	25 – Dickinson	9 – Dickinson	7 – Jones	Simon Skjodt Assembly Hall (17,222); Bloomington, IN
January 26, 2022; 6:30 p.m., BTN		Northwestern	W 72–70	10–7 (4–3)	18 – Houstan	7 – Diabaté	6 – Jones	Crisler Center (11,240); Ann Arbor, MI
January 29, 2022; 12:30 p.m., CBS		at No. 10 Michigan State; Rivalry	L 67–83	10–8 (4–4)	25 – Dickinson	9 – Diabaté	6 – Brooks	Breslin Center (14,797); East Lansing, MI
February 1, 2022; 9:00 p.m., BTN		Nebraska	W 85–79	11–8 (5–4)	26 – Dickinson	8 – Dickinson	3 – Tied	Crisler Center (9,301); Ann Arbor, MI
February 5, 2022; 2:30 p.m., FOX		at No. 4 Purdue	L 76–82	11–9 (5–5)	28 – Dickinson	4 – Jones	4 – Jones	Mackey Arena (14,804); West Lafayette, IN
February 8, 2022; 9:00 p.m., ESPN2		at Penn State	W 58–57	12–9 (6–5)	19 – Dickinson	15 – Dickinson	5 – Jones	Bryce Jordan Center (8,650); University Park, PA
February 10, 2022; 9:00 p.m., ESPN		No. 3 Purdue	W 82–58	13–9 (7–5)	22 – Dickinson	9 – Dickinson	10 – Jones	Crisler Center (11,452); Ann Arbor, MI
February 12, 2022; 6:00 p.m., ESPN		No. 16 Ohio State; Rivalry	L 57–68	13–10 (7–6)	17 – Brooks	10 – Jones	8 – Jones	Crisler Center (12,707); Ann Arbor, MI
February 17, 2022; 7:00 p.m., ESPN		at Iowa	W 84–79	14–10 (8–6)	28 – Diabaté	10 – Dickinson	7 – Dickinson	Carver–Hawkeye Arena (13,048); Iowa City, IA
February 20, 2022; 1:00 p.m., CBS		at No. 15 Wisconsin	L 63–77	14–11 (8–7)	21 – Dickinson	10 – Houstan	7 – Jones	Kohl Center (17,287); Madison, WI
February 23, 2022; 7:00 p.m., BTN		Rutgers	W 71–62	15–11 (9–7)	21 – Houstan	11 – Dickinson	3 – Jones	Crisler Center (11,336); Ann Arbor, MI
February 27, 2022; 2:00 p.m., CBS		No. 15 Illinois	L 85–93	15–12 (9–8)	25 – Jones	11 – Dickinson	10 – Jones	Crisler Center (12,707); Ann Arbor, MI
March 1, 2022; 8:30 p.m., FS1		Michigan State; Rivalry	W 87–70	16–12 (10–8)	33 – Dickinson	9 – Dickinson	4 – Collins	Crisler Center (11,721); Ann Arbor, MI
March 3, 2022; 9:00 p.m., FS1		No. 24 Iowa	L 71–82	16–13 (10–9)	21 – Dickinson	11 – Dickinson	6 – Jones	Crisler Center (12,707); Ann Arbor, MI
March 6, 2022; 12:30 p.m., FOX		at No. 23 Ohio State; Rivalry	W 75–69	17–13 (11–9)	21 – Jones	7 – Tied	9 – Jones	Value City Arena (18,809); Columbus, OH
Big Ten tournament
March 10, 2022; 11:30 a.m., BTN	(8)	vs. (9) Indiana; Second Round	L 69–74	17–14	18 – Jones	12 – Diabate	3 – Tied	Gainbridge Fieldhouse; Indianapolis, IN
NCAA tournament
March 17, 2022; 12:15 p.m., CBS	(11 S)	vs. (6 S) No. 24 Colorado State; First Round	W 75–63	18–14	21 – Dickinson	9 – Diabaté	6 – Brooks	Gainbridge Fieldhouse (15,782); Indianapolis, IN
March 19, 2022; 5:50 p.m., CBS	(11 S)	vs. (3 S) No. 5 Tennessee; Second Round	W 76–68	19–14	27 – Dickinson	11 – Dickinson	5 – Brooks	Gainbridge Fieldhouse (17,838); Indianapolis, IN
March 24, 2022; 7:29 p.m., TBS	(11 S)	vs. (2 S) No. 6 Villanova; Sweet Sixteen	L 55–63	19–15	15 – Dickinson	15 – Dickinson	4 – Jones	AT&T Center (17,357); San Antonio, TX
*Non-conference game. ^{#}Rankings from AP Poll. (#) Tournament seedings in parentheses. S=South. All times are in Eastern Time.

== Rankings ==
Ranking movements Legend: ██ Increase in ranking ██ Decrease in ranking — = Not ranked RV = Received votes т = Tied with team above or below
	Week																				
Poll	Pre	1	2	3	4	5	6	7	8	9	10	11	12	13	14	15	16	17	18	19	Final
AP	6	4	20	24	RV	RV	RV	RV	—	—	—	—	—	—	—	—	—	—	—	—	Not released
Coaches	6	6^	13т	24	RV	—	RV	RV	—	—	—	—	—	—	—	—	—	—	—	—	25

^Coaches did not release a Week 1 poll.
*AP does not release post-NCAA tournament rankings.

== Honors ==
Hunter Dickinson was a second team All-Big Ten honoree by both the coaches and the media. Moussa Diabate was a Big Ten All-Freshmen honoree by the coaches and Eli Brooks was an honorable mention All-Big Ten honoree.

== Team players drafted into the NBA ==
Caleb Houstan was drafted 32nd overall in the second round of the 2022 NBA draft by the Orlando Magic. Moussa Diabaté was drafted 43rd overall in the 2022 NBA draft by the Los Angeles Clippers.

Year	Round	Pick	Overall	Player	NBA Club
2022	2	2	32	Caleb Houstan	Orlando Magic
2022	2	13	43	Moussa Diabaté	Los Angeles Clippers
2023	1	15	15	Kobe Bufkin	Atlanta Hawks
