= 2020–21 Michigan Wolverines men's basketball team =

American college basketball season

2020–21 Michigan Wolverines men's basketball

Big Ten regular season champions

NCAA tournament, Elite Eight
- Conference: Big Ten Conference

Ranking
- Coaches: No. 4
- AP: No. 4
- Record: 23–5 (14–3 Big Ten)
- Head coach: Juwan Howard (2nd season)
- Assistant coaches: Saddi Washington (5th season); Phil Martelli (2nd season); Howard Eisley (2nd season)
- Captains: Isaiah Livers; Austin Davis; Eli Brooks
- Home arena: Crisler Center

2020–21 Big Ten Conference men's basketball standings
	Conf.				Overall
Team	W		L	PCT	W		L	PCT
No. 4 Michigan	14	–	3	.824	23	–	5	.821
No. 2 Illinois †	16	–	4	.800	24	–	7	.774
No. 8 Iowa	14	–	6	.700	22	–	9	.710
No. 20 Purdue	13	–	6	.684	18	–	10	.643
No. 7 Ohio State	12	–	8	.600	21	–	10	.677
Wisconsin	10	–	10	.500	18	–	13	.581
Rutgers	10	–	10	.500	16	–	12	.571
Maryland	9	–	11	.450	17	–	14	.548
Michigan State	9	–	11	.450	15	–	13	.536
Indiana	7	–	12	.368	12	–	15	.444
Penn State	7	–	12	.368	11	–	14	.440
Northwestern	6	–	13	.316	9	–	15	.375
Minnesota	6	–	14	.300	14	–	15	.483
Nebraska	3	–	16	.158	7	–	20	.259
† Conference tournament winner Rankings from AP poll

The 2020–21 Michigan Wolverines men's basketball team represented the University of Michigan during the 2020–21 NCAA Division I men's basketball season. This season marked the program's 105th season and its 104th consecutive year as a member of the Big Ten Conference. The Wolverines, led by second-year head coach Juwan Howard, played their home games for the 54th consecutive year at the Crisler Center in Ann Arbor, Michigan.

The Wolverines finished the season with a 23–5 record, including a 14–3 conference record, to win its first Big Ten championship since 2014. The team earned a one seed in the 2021 NCAA Division I men's basketball tournament, where they reached the Elite Eight before losing to UCLA.

== Previous season ==
The Wolverines finished the 2019–20 season 19–12, including 10–10 in Big Ten play. Michigan was scheduled to face Rutgers in the second round of the Big Ten tournament; however, on March 12, 2020, the Big Ten canceled the tournament. Also on March 12, the NCAA announced the cancellation of the NCAA tournament, along with all remaining winter and spring championships, due to the COVID-19 pandemic.

== Offseason ==
=== Departures ===
Michigan Departures
Name	Number	Pos.	Height	Weight	Year	Hometown	Notes
Zavier Simpson	3	G	6'0"	190	Sr	Lima, OH	Graduated
Jon Teske	15	F	7'1"	250	Sr	Indianapolis, IN	Graduated
David DeJulius	0	G	6'0"	190	So	Detroit, MI	Transferred to Cincinnati
Colin Castleton	11	F	6'11"	235	So	Daytona Beach, FL	Transferred to Florida
Cole Bajema	22	F	6'7"	175	Fr	Lynden, WA	Transferred to Washington

=== Incoming transfers ===
Incoming transfers
Name	Number	Pos.	Height	Weight	Year	Hometown	Previous School
Chaundee Brown	15	G	6'5"	220	Sr	Orlando, FL	Wake Forest
Mike Smith	12	G	5'11"	180	GS	Burr Ridge, IL	Columbia

=== Recruiting classes ===
==== 2020 recruiting class ====
On October 23, 2018, Michigan received its first class of 2020 commitment from four-star guard Zeb Jackson of Montverde Academy in suburban Orlando, Florida. Jackson had met assistant coach DeAndre Haynes when he was on the Toledo staff. On October 17, 2019, Michigan received its second commitment of the 2020 class and the first commitment of the Juwan Howard era, five-star power forward Isaiah Todd of Word of God Christian Academy in Raleigh, North Carolina. Todd was the highest-rated recruit to commit to Michigan since 2000 but Todd ended up decommitting from Michigan on April 14, 2020 to instead play in the NBA G League. Howard then picked up his third commitment of the 2020 class in Hunter Dickinson a four-star Center out of Hyattsville, Maryland. On January 1, 2020, Terrance Williams II, a four-star Forward out of Washington D.C. who de-committed from Georgetown in December 2019, became the fourth commit of the 2020 class. On January 20, Howard picked up his fifth commitment of the 2020 class, his son Jace Howard, a three-star small forward from Miami.

College recruiting
Name	Hometown	School	Height	Weight	Commit date
Zeb Jackson; SG	Toledo, OH	Montverde Academy (FL)	6 ft 2 in (1.88 m)	160 lb (73 kg)	Oct 23, 2018
Zeb Jackson; SG	Recruit ratings: Rivals: 247Sports: ESPN: (83)				
Hunter Dickinson; C	Alexandria, VA	DeMatha Catholic (MD)	7 ft 2 in (2.18 m)	255 lb (116 kg)	Dec 20, 2019
Hunter Dickinson; C	Recruit ratings: Rivals: 247Sports: ESPN: (87)				
Terrance Williams II; PF	Clinton, MD	Gonzaga College (DC)	6 ft 6 in (1.98 m)	215 lb (98 kg)	Jan 1, 2020
Terrance Williams II; PF	Recruit ratings: Rivals: 247Sports: ESPN: (82)				
Jace Howard; SF	Miami, FL	NSU University School (FL)	6 ft 8 in (2.03 m)	210 lb (95 kg)	Jan 20, 2020
Jace Howard; SF	Recruit ratings: Rivals: 247Sports: ESPN: (75)				
Overall recruit ranking: Rivals: 17 247Sports: 14 ESPN: 9
Note: In many cases, Scout, Rivals, 247Sports, On3, and ESPN may conflict in their listings of height and weight.; In these cases, the average was taken. ESPN grades are on a 100-point scale.; Sources: "Michigan 2020 Basketball Commitments". Rivals.; "2020 Michigan Wolverines Recruiting Class". ESPN.; "2020 Team Ranking". Rivals.

==== 2021 Recruiting class ====
College recruiting (2021)
Name	Hometown	School	Height	Weight	Commit date
Isaiah Barnes; SF	Chicago, IL	Simeon (IL)	6 ft 6 in (1.98 m)	180 lb (82 kg)	Jun 24, 2020
Isaiah Barnes; SF	Recruit ratings: Rivals: 247Sports: ESPN: (81)				
Will Tschetter; PF	Stewartville, MN	Stewartville (MN)	6 ft 8 in (2.03 m)	225 lb (102 kg)	Jul 6, 2020
Will Tschetter; PF	Recruit ratings: Rivals: 247Sports: ESPN: (81)				
Kobe Bufkin; SG	Grand Rapids, MI	Grand Rapids Christian (MI)	6 ft 4 in (1.93 m)	175 lb (79 kg)	Jul 10, 2020
Kobe Bufkin; SG	Recruit ratings: Rivals: 247Sports: ESPN: (85)				
Frankie Collins; PG	Las Vegas, NV	Coronado (NV)	6 ft 1 in (1.85 m)	180 lb (82 kg)	Aug 19, 2020
Frankie Collins; PG	Recruit ratings: Rivals: 247Sports: ESPN: (86)				
Caleb Houstan; SF / PF	Mississauga, Ontario	Montverde Academy (FL)	6 ft 8 in (2.03 m)	205 lb (93 kg)	Oct 30, 2020
Caleb Houstan; SF / PF	Recruit ratings: Rivals: 247Sports: ESPN: (95)				
Moussa Diabaté; PF	Paris, France	IMG Academy (FL)	6 ft 10 in (2.08 m)	215 lb (98 kg)	Nov 9, 2020
Moussa Diabaté; PF	Recruit ratings: Rivals: 247Sports: ESPN: (95)				
Overall recruit ranking: Rivals: 1 247Sports: 1 ESPN: 1
Note: In many cases, Scout, Rivals, 247Sports, On3, and ESPN may conflict in their listings of height and weight.; In these cases, the average was taken. ESPN grades are on a 100-point scale.; Sources: "Michigan 2021 Basketball Commitments". Rivals.; "2021 Michigan Wolverines Recruiting Class". ESPN.; "2021 Team Ranking". Rivals.

== Roster ==
2020–21 Michigan Wolverines men's basketball team
Players
Coaches

Pos.	#	Name	Height	Weight	Year	Previous school	Hometown
G	0	Adrien Nunez	6 ft 6 in (1.98 m)	210 lb (95 kg)	Jr	St. Thomas More Prep	Brooklyn, NY
C	1	Hunter Dickinson	7 ft 1 in (2.16 m)	255 lb (116 kg)	Fr	DeMatha Catholic	Alexandria, VA
F	2	Isaiah Livers (C)	6 ft 7 in (2.01 m)	230 lb (104 kg)	Sr	Kalamazoo Central	Kalamazoo, MI
G	3	Zeb Jackson	6 ft 5 in (1.96 m)	180 lb (82 kg)	Fr	Montverde Academy	Toledo, OH
G	4	Brandon Wade (W)	6 ft 1 in (1.85 m)	185 lb (84 kg)	Jr	Skyline	Ann Arbor, MI
F	5	Terrance Williams II	6 ft 7 in (2.01 m)	240 lb (109 kg)	Fr	Gonzaga College	Clinton, MD
G	12	Mike Smith	5 ft 11 in (1.8 m)	185 lb (84 kg)	GS	Columbia	Burr Ridge, IL
G	14	Rico Ozuna-Harrison (W)	5 ft 11 in (1.8 m)	175 lb (79 kg)	Sr	Cass Tech	Detroit, MI
G	15	Chaundee Brown	6 ft 5 in (1.96 m)	215 lb (98 kg)	Sr	Wake Forest	Orlando, FL
G	21	Franz Wagner	6 ft 9 in (2.06 m)	220 lb (100 kg)	So	Alba Berlin	Berlin, Germany
F	23	Brandon Johns Jr.	6 ft 8 in (2.03 m)	240 lb (109 kg)	Jr	East Lansing	East Lansing, MI
F	24	C. J. Baird (W)	6 ft 5 in (1.96 m)	225 lb (102 kg)	Sr	Detroit Catholic Central	Novi, MI
G	25	Jace Howard	6 ft 7 in (2.01 m)	210 lb (95 kg)	Fr	NSU University School	Miami, FL
G	32	Luke Wilson (W)	6 ft 0 in (1.83 m)	175 lb (79 kg)	Sr	Boulder	Boulder, CO
F	44	Jaron Faulds (W)	6 ft 10 in (2.08 m)	240 lb (109 kg)	Sr	Holt	Holt, MI
F	51	Austin Davis (C)	6 ft 10 in (2.08 m)	250 lb (113 kg)	GS	Onsted	Onsted, MI
G	55	Eli Brooks (C)	6 ft 1 in (1.85 m)	185 lb (84 kg)	Sr	Spring Grove	Spring Grove, PA

Head coach

Juwan Howard (Michigan)

Assistant coach(es)

- Saddi Washington (Western Michigan)
- Phil Martelli (Widener)
- Howard Eisley (Boston College)

Legend

- (C) Team captain
- (S) Suspended
- (I) Ineligible
- (W) Walk-on
- Injured
- Current redshirt

Roster
Last update: October 22, 2020

== Regular season ==
=== November ===
Michigan began the season with a 96–82 victory over Bowling Green. Michigan was led by Chaundee Brown with 19 points, while Isaiah Livers added 17 points and nine rebounds, one rebound shy of a double-double, and Mike Smith added 16 points and eight assists in his Michigan debut. On November 29, Michigan defeated Oakland 81–71 in overtime. Michigan was led by Livers with 22 points, while Hunter Dickinson scored a career-high 19-points.

=== December ===
On December 2, Michigan defeated Ball State 84–56. Michigan was led by Livers with a game-high 21 points, his second consecutive 20-plus point game, while Dickinson added 12 points and a season-high 11 rebounds for his first career double-double. On December 6, Michigan defeated UCF 80–58. Michigan was led by Brown with 18 points, while Dickinson added 14 points and seven rebounds, Eli Brooks added 10 points, and Terrance Williams II added a career-high 10 points and six rebounds. Michigan went on a 22–4 run to end the first half to take their first lead of the game, before closing out the game on a 29–5 run in the second half. Michigan was scheduled to face NC State in the ACC–Big Ten Challenge on December 9, however, the game was postponed due to COVID-19 concerns within the Wolfpack program. It was announced Michigan would then host Toledo for the first time since 1983. Michigan defeated Toledo 91–71. Michigan was led by Dickinson with a game-high 18 points and seven rebounds, while Livers added 16 points, Franz Wagner added 14 points, and Austin Davis and Brooks added 12 points each. On December 13, Michigan defeated Penn State 62–58 in its Big Ten Conference season opener. Michigan was led by Dickinson with a career-high 20 points, while Brooks added 12 points and Livers added 10 points. On December 25, Michigan defeated Nebraska 80–69. Michigan was led by Wagner with 20 points and nine rebounds, one rebound shy of a double-double, while Livers added 17 points, Dickinson added 13 points and a career-high 15 rebounds, for his second career double-double, Brown added 13 points and Smith added 10 points. On December 31, Michigan defeated Maryland 84–73. Michigan was led by Dickinson with a career-high 26 points and 11 rebounds, for his third career double-double, while Wagner added 19 points and Smith tied a season-high with 16 points.

=== January ===
On January 3, 2021, Michigan defeated (#19 AP Poll/#22 Coaches Poll) Northwestern 85–66. Michigan was led by Dickinson with a game-high 19 points, while Wagner added 14 points, 10 rebounds and a career-high five blockes, for his first double-double of the season, and Brown and Brooks added 14 points each. On January 6, Michigan defeated (#16/#17) Minnesota 82–57. Michigan was led by Dickinson with a career-high 28 points, his tenth consecutive game scoring in double-digits, while Livers added 14 points and seven rebounds and Wagner added 12 points. On January 12, Michigan defeated (#9/#9) Wisconsin 77–54. Michigan was led by Smith with 16 points, while Wagner added 15 points and 10 rebounds, for his third career double-double, Livers added 13 points, six rebounds, three assists and three blocks, and Dickinson added 12 points, six rebounds and three blocks. Michigan's blowout win included a 43–6 run that gave the Wolverines a 69–29 lead with 10:23 left in the game. Michigan became the first team in NCAA history to win three consecutive games against ranked opponents by 19 points or more. On January 16, Michigan lost to (#23/#19) Minnesota 57–75. Michigan was led by Brown with 14 points in his first start, replacing an injured Brooks, while Smith added a career-high 10 assists. Dickinson scored a season-low nine points, ending his streak of 11 consecutive games to start the season with double-digit points. Michigan shot a season-low 39.3 percent, and had a season-high-tying 20 turnovers. On January 19, Michigan defeated Maryland 87–63. Michigan was led by Livers with 20 points, while Wagner added 15 points and Smith added 11 points. On January 22, Michigan defeated Purdue 70–53. Michigan was led by Livers with a game-high 22 points and 10 rebounds, for his first double-double of the season. Michigan's defense held Purdue to a season-low 53 points and a 30.8 percent shooting, as the Boilermakers suffered their first home loss of the season. On January 23, the University of Michigan Athletic Department announced it would immediately pause athletic activities in all sports, including games, team and individual training sessions, for up to 14 days.

=== February ===
On February 14, Michigan defeated (#21/#21) Wisconsin 67–59. Michigan was led by Livers with a game-high 20 points, while Dickinson added 11 points and a career-high tying 15 rebounds, for his fourth career double-double. Michigan rallied from a 14-point deficit, including an 8–0 run to close out the final two minutes of the game to complete the comeback victory. On February 18 Michigan defeated Rutgers 71–64. Michigan was led by Wagner with a game-high 20 points, seven rebounds, three assists and one steal, while Smith added 12 points. According to a Fox Sports tweet, the 10–1 conference start was Michigan's first since the 1976–77 team. On February 21, Michigan defeated (#4/#4) Ohio State 92–87. Michigan was led by Dicksinson with 22 points, nine rebounds, two blocks and two assists, while Brooks added a season-high 17 points, and Brown Jr. scored 15 points off the bench. This game marked the first time in the rivalry between Michigan and Ohio State when both teams were ranked in the top five nationally. On February 25, Michigan defeated (#9/#12) Iowa 79–57. Michigan was led by Wagner with 21 points, 13 of which came in the second half, while Livers added 16 points, six rebounds, one assist and one steal, and Dickinson added 14 points and eight rebounds. Michigan's defense held Iowa to a season-low point total in a half, giving up just 29 points to the Hawkeyes in the first half, while forcing nine turnovers. On February 27, Michigan defeated Indiana 73–57. Michigan was led by Wagner with a season-high tying 21 points, while Livers added 16 points and 10 rebounds for his second double-double of the season.

=== March ===
On March 2, Michigan lost to (#4/#4) Illinois 76–53. Michigan was led by Brooks with 11 points, while Davis added nine points off the bench, and Livers added seven points and a team-high six rebounds. On March 4, Michigan defeated Michigan State 69–50 in their rivalry game. Michigan was led by Wagner with 19 points, while Dickinson added 14 points and 10 rebounds for his fifth career double-double, and Brooks, Livers and Smith added nine points each. With the win, the Wolverines clinched the Big Ten Conference regular-season championship for the first time since 2014 due to having the highest winning percentage in the conference. On March 7, Michigan lost to Michigan State 70–64 in its final game of the regular season. This was Michigan's first loss to an unranked opponent this season. Michigan was led by Brown with 13 points, while Dickinson added 12 points, Wagner added 11 points, six rebounds and five assists, and Smith added 11 points and seven assists to surpass 500 career assists. Brooks, who scored five of Michigan's first seven points, left the court with an ankle injury after a rough landing on a jumper less than five minutes into the game, and did not return to the game.

== Postseason ==
=== Big Ten tournament ===
On March 12, Michigan opened its 2021 Big Ten men's basketball tournament play with a 79–66 victory over Maryland in the quarterfinals. Michigan was led by Smith with 18 points and set a Big Ten tournament record with 15 assists, while Wagner and Brooks had 16 points and four rebounds each, and Brown had 10 points. Michigan rallied from a 12-point deficit in the first half, including a 16–2 run to close out the final four minutes of the half, to re-gain the lead they never relinquished. Michigan has won 14 straight tournament openers, the most of any major conference team.

The next day Michigan lost to (#9/#10) Ohio State 68–67 in the semifinals of the Big Ten tournament. Michigan was led by Dickinson with 21 points, nine of which came in the final four minutes of the game, while Brooks added 12 points, Smith added 10 points and Wagner added eight points, six rebounds, four assists and two blocks before fouling out late in the second half. Michigan rallied from a 13-point deficit in the second half, including a 11–0 run in the final four minutes of the game, however, their comeback attempt came up short. The Wolverines made a season-best 21 free throws on 23 attempts.

=== NCAA tournament ===
On March 20, Michigan began their participation in the 2021 NCAA tournament with an 82–66 victory over Texas Southern in the first round. Michigan was led by Smith with 18 points, five assists, four rebounds and one steal, while Dickinson added 16 points and three blocks before fouling out, Brooks and Johns Jr. added 11 points each, and Wagner added nine points, nine rebounds, and a career-high six assists.

On March 22, Michigan defeated LSU 86–78 in the second round. Michigan was led by Brown Jr. and Brooks with 21 points each, while Wagner added 15 points and Dickinson added 12 points and 11 rebounds for his sixth career double-double. LSU began the second half with a 9–2 run and regained a six-point lead, 51–45, four minutes into the second period. Michigan then went on a 10–0 run, and regained the lead 55–51. The Tigers responded with a 10–3 run, before the Wolverines used a 14–1 to regain the lead they never relinquished. With the win, the Wolverines advanced to the Sweet Sixteen for the fourth consecutive year, the second-longest active streak, behind Gonzaga with six.

On March 28, Michigan defeated (#14/#14) Florida State 76–58 in the Sweet Sixteen. Michigan was led by Johns Jr. with 14 points, six rebounds, two steals and two assists, while Dickinson added 14 points, eight rebounds, two blocks and two assists, Wagner added 13 points and 10 rebounds, for his third double-double of the season, and Brown Jr. added 12 points. Michigan scored 50 percent of its points in the paint and 24 points off turnovers. Michigan's defense held the Seminoles to under 60 points for the first time this season, and forced 14 turnovers. With the win, the Wolverines advanced to the Elite Eight for the fifteenth time in program history and first time since 2018. The Wolverines would then lose to #11 seed UCLA 51–49, ending their season.

==== NBA draft ====
Following the season, the NCAA declared that regardless of remaining eligibility all winter sports athletes could return for another season due to the impact of COVID-19. Nonetheless, several players declared for the 2021 NBA draft: Smith on April 7, On April 7, Brown on April 10, Livers on April 16, and Wagner on May 4.

== Schedule and results ==
Date time, TV	Rank^{#}	Opponent^{#}	Result	Record	High points	High rebounds	High assists	Site (attendance) city, state
Regular Season
November 25, 2020*; 4:00 pm, ESPN2	No. 25	Bowling Green	W 96–82	1–0	19 – Brown	9 – Livers	8 – Smith	Crisler Center (0); Ann Arbor, MI
November 29, 2020*; 6:00 pm, BTN	No. 25	Oakland	W 81–71 ^{OT}	2–0	22 – Livers	13 – Wagner	5 – Brooks	Crisler Center (0); Ann Arbor, MI
December 2, 2020*; 7:00 pm, BTN		Ball State	W 84–56	3–0	21 – Livers	11 – Dickinson	3 – Tied	Crisler Center (0); Ann Arbor, MI
December 6, 2020*; 4:00 pm, BTN		UCF	W 80–58	4–0	18 – Brown	7 – Tied	5 – Brooks	Crisler Center (0); Ann Arbor, MI
December 9, 2020*; 7:00 pm, ESPN2		NC State; ACC–Big Ten Challenge	Cancelled due to the COVID-19 pandemic					Crisler Center; Ann Arbor, MI
December 9, 2020*; 6:00 pm, FS1		Toledo	W 91–71	5–0	18 – Dickinson	7 – Dickinson	7 – Smith	Crisler Center (0); Ann Arbor, MI
December 13, 2020; 2:00 pm, BTN		Penn State	W 62–58	6–0 (1–0)	20 – Dickinson	7 – Tied	3 – Tied	Crisler Center (0); Ann Arbor, MI
December 25, 2020; 6:00 pm, BTN	No. 19	at Nebraska; Christmas Day	W 80–69	7–0 (2–0)	20 – Wagner	15 – Dickinson	6 – Smith	Pinnacle Bank Arena (0); Lincoln, NE
December 31, 2020; 8:00 pm, ESPN	No. 16	at Maryland; New Year's Eve	W 84–73	8–0 (3–0)	26 – Dickinson	11 – Dickinson	6 – Smith	Xfinity Center (0); College Park, MD
January 3, 2021; 7:30 pm, BTN	No. 16	No. 19 Northwestern	W 85–66	9–0 (4–0)	19 – Dickinson	10 – Wagner	6 – Smith	Crisler Center (88); Ann Arbor, MI
January 6, 2021; 8:30 pm, BTN	No. 10	No. 16 Minnesota	W 82–57	10–0 (5–0)	28 – Dickinson	8 – Dickinson	6 – Smith	Crisler Center (64); Ann Arbor, MI
January 12, 2021; 7:00 pm, ESPN	No. 7	No. 9 Wisconsin	W 77–54	11–0 (6–0)	16 – Smith	10 – Wagner	6 – Smith	Crisler Center (74); Ann Arbor, MI
January 16, 2021; 2:00 pm, ESPN2	No. 7	at No. 23 Minnesota	L 57–75	11–1 (6–1)	14 – Brown	9 – Tied	10 – Smith	Williams Arena (38); Minneapolis, MN
January 19, 2021; 7:00 pm, FS1	No. 7	Maryland	W 87–63	12–1 (7–1)	20 – Livers	6 – Tied	6 – Smith	Crisler Center (65); Ann Arbor, MI
January 22, 2021; 7:00 pm, FS1	No. 7	at Purdue	W 70–53	13–1 (8–1)	22 – Livers	10 – Livers	5 – Wagner	Mackey Arena (250); West Lafayette, IN
January 27, 2021; 7:00 pm, BTN	No. 4	at Penn State	Postponed due to the COVID-19 pandemic					Bryce Jordan Center; University Park, PA
January 30, 2021; 1:00 pm, CBS	No. 4	Indiana	Postponed due to the COVID-19 pandemic					Crisler Center; Ann Arbor, MI
February 3, 2021; 9:00 pm, BTN	No. 4	at Northwestern	Postponed due to the COVID-19 pandemic					Welsh-Ryan Arena; Evanston, IL
February 14, 2021; 1:00 pm, CBS	No. 3	at No. 21 Wisconsin	W 67–59	14–1 (9–1)	20 – Livers	15 – Dickinson	6 – Smith	Kohl Center (0); Madison, WI
February 18, 2021; 9:00 pm, FS1	No. 3	Rutgers	W 71–64	15–1 (10–1)	20 – Wagner	8 – Dickinson	4 – Brooks	Crisler Center (43); Ann Arbor, MI
February 21, 2021; 1:00 pm, CBS	No. 3	at No. 4 Ohio State; Rivalry	W 92–87	16–1 (11–1)	22 – Dickinson	9 – Dickinson	7 – Smith	Value City Arena (0); Columbus, OH
February 25, 2021; 7:00 pm, ESPN	No. 3	No. 9 Iowa	W 79–57	17–1 (12–1)	21 – Wagner	8 – Tied	4 – Tied	Crisler Center (83); Ann Arbor, MI
February 27, 2021; 12:00 pm, FOX	No. 3	at Indiana	W 73–57	18–1 (13–1)	21 – Wagner	10 – Livers	3 – Smith	Simon Skjodt Assembly Hall (0); Bloomington, IN
March 2, 2021; 7:00 pm, ESPN	No. 2	No. 4 Illinois	L 53–76	18–2 (13–2)	11 – Brooks	6 – Livers	2 – Tied	Crisler Center (94); Ann Arbor, MI
March 4, 2021; 7:00 pm, ESPN	No. 2	Michigan State; Rivalry	W 69–50	19–2 (14–2)	19 – Wagner	10 – Dickinson	5 – Smith	Crisler Center (133); Ann Arbor, MI
March 7, 2021; 4:30 pm, CBS	No. 2	at Michigan State; Rivalry	L 64–70	19–3 (14–3)	13 – Brown	7 – Dickinson	7 – Smith	Breslin Center (0); East Lansing, MI
Big Ten tournament
March 12, 2021; 11:30 am, BTN	(1) No. 4	vs. (8) Maryland; Quarterfinals	W 79–66	20–3	18 – Smith	8 – Davis	15 – Smith	Lucas Oil Stadium (7,634); Indianapolis, IN
March 13, 2021; 1:00 pm, CBS	(1) No. 4	vs. (5) No. 9 Ohio State; Semifinals/Rivalry	L 67–68	20–4	21 – Dickinson	8 – Tied	4 – Tied	Lucas Oil Stadium (8,000); Indianapolis, IN
NCAA tournament
March 20, 2021; 3:00 pm, CBS	(1 E) No. 4	vs. (16 E) Texas Southern; First Round	W 82–66	21–4	18 – Smith	9 – Wagner	6 – Wagner	Mackey Arena (1,307); West Lafayette, IN
March 22, 2021; 7:10 pm, CBS	(1 E) No. 4	vs. (8 E) LSU; Second Round	W 86–78	22–4	21 – Tied	11 – Dickinson	7 – Brooks	Lucas Oil Stadium (5,546); Indianapolis, IN
March 28, 2021; 5:00 pm, CBS	(1 E) No. 4	vs. (4 E) No. 14 Florida State; Sweet Sixteen	W 76–58	23–4	14 – Tied	10 – Wagner	5 – Wagner	Bankers Life Fieldhouse (3,645); Indianapolis, IN
March 30, 2021; 9:57 pm, TBS	(1 E) No. 4	vs. (11 E) UCLA; Elite Eight	L 49–51	23–5	11 – Dickinson	9 – Brown	4 – Tied	Lucas Oil Stadium (7,515); Indianapolis, IN
*Non-conference game. ^{#}Rankings from AP Poll. (#) Tournament seedings in parentheses. E=East. All times are in Eastern Time.

== Rankings ==
Ranking movements Legend: ██ Increase in ranking ██ Decrease in ranking RV = Received votes ( ) = First-place votes
	Week																	
Poll	Pre	1	2	3	4	5	6	7	8	9	10	11	12	13	14	15	16	Final
AP	25	RV	RV	25	19	16	10	7	7	4	4	3	3	3	2 (4)	4	4	Not released
Coaches'	RV	RV^	RV	24	19	15	9	5	7	4	4	3	3	3 (1)	2 (1)	4	4	4

^Coaches did not release a Week 1 poll.

== Honors ==
Following the season Juwan Howard was named Big Ten Conference Coach of the Year while Hunter Dickinson was named Big Ten Conference Freshman of the Year. Dickinson was also named a first team All-Big Ten selection by the media and a Big Ten All-Freshman honoree, Isaiah Livers was named a second team All-Big Ten selection by both the coaches and media, and Franz Wagner was named a second team All-Big Ten selection by the coaches.

Multiple Wolverines also earned national honors as well. Juwan Howard was named the National Coach of the Year by Sporting News and awarded the Henry Iba Award by the USBWA. Hunter Dickinson garnered consensus second team All-American honors, being chosen on the second team by each of the four major selectors. He became Michigan's first consensus All-American since Nik Stauskas in 2014 and 13th all time.

=== Team players drafted into the NBA ===
Franz Wagner was drafted 8th overall in the first round of the 2021 NBA draft by the Orlando Magic. Isaiah Livers was drafted 42nd overall in the 2021 NBA draft by the Detroit Pistons.

Year	Round	Pick	Overall	Player	NBA club
2021	1	8	8	Franz Wagner	Orlando Magic
2021	2	12	42	Isaiah Livers	Detroit Pistons
