= Eli Brooks =

American basketball player (born 1998)

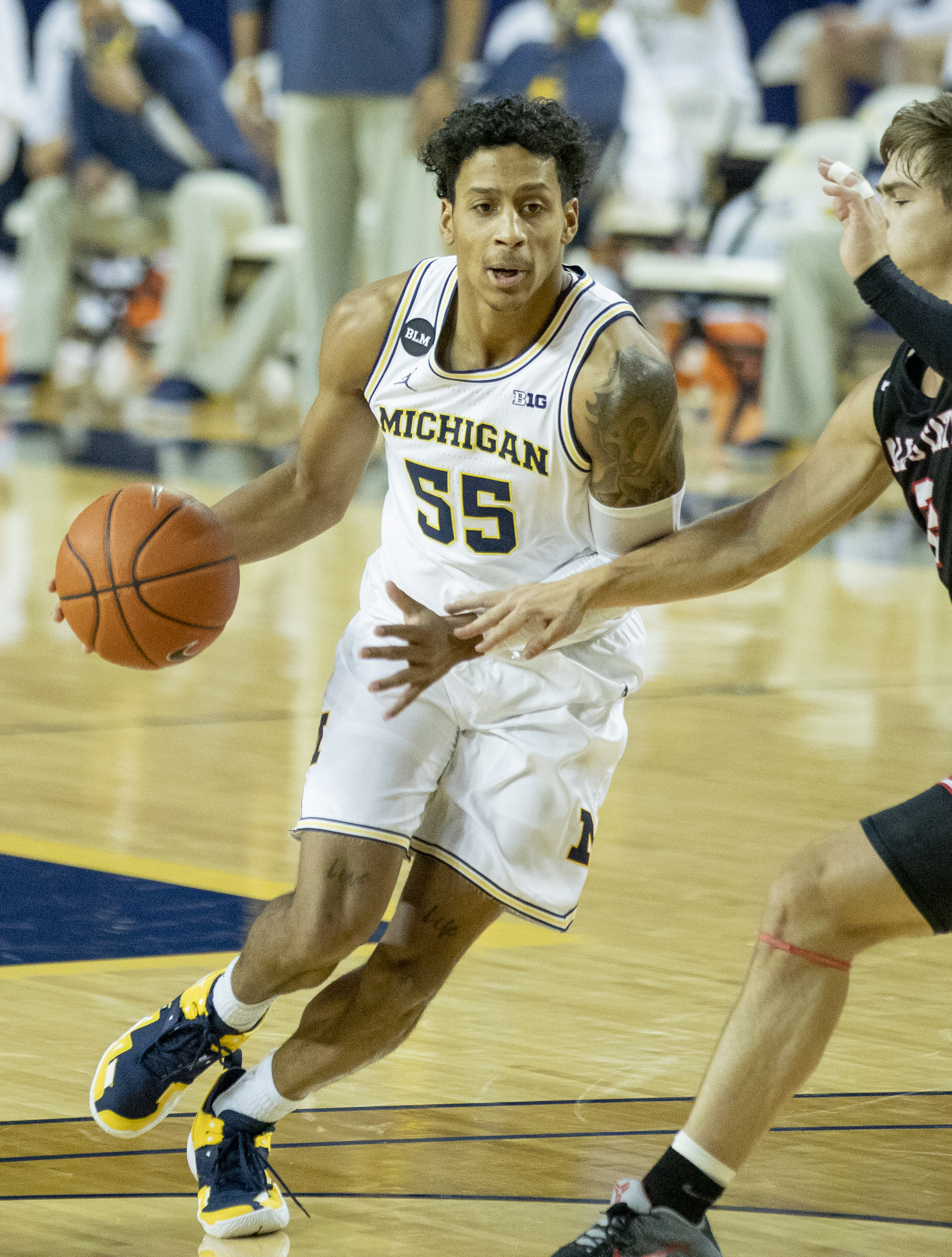
- Brooks with Michigan in 2020

No. 55 – Gladiators Trier
- Position: Point guard
- League: Basketball Bundesliga

Personal information
- Born: October 14, 1998 (age 28) Sumter, South Carolina
- Listed height: 6 ft 1 in (1.85 m)
- Listed weight: 185 lb (84 kg)

Career information
- High school: Spring Grove Area (Spring Grove, Pennsylvania)
- College: Michigan (2017–2022)
- NBA draft: 2022: undrafted
- Playing career: 2022–present

Career history
- 2022–2023: Fort Wayne Mad Ants
- 2023–2024: Pallacanestro Trieste
- 2024–2025: EWE Baskets Oldenburg
- 2025: Gladiators Trier
- 2025–2026: Bàsquet Manresa
- 2026–present: Gladiators Trier
- Stats at Basketball Reference

Eli James Brooks (born October 14, 1998) is an American professional basketball player for Gladiators Trier of the Basketball Bundesliga (BBL). He played college basketball for the Michigan Wolverines.

== High school career ==
Brooks attended Spring Grove Area High School in Spring Grove, Pennsylvania, where he was coached by his father. He played AAU Basketball for the Jersey Shore Warriors. Brooks averaged 20.1 points per game as a sophomore and led YAIAA guards in rebounding.

He averaged 24.7 points, 7.6 rebounds, 3.8 steals and 2.3 assists per game as a junior, leading Spring Grove to its first state tournament appearance in school history. As a senior, Brooks averaged 29.7 points, 12 rebounds, and four assists per game. He led the Rockets to a 22–9 record, helping the team to a quarterfinal berth in the PIAA Class 5-A playoffs. Brooks was named to the Class 5-A First Team All-State and was a finalist for Pennsylvania Mr. Basketball. He finished his career with 2,426 points. On July 19, 2016, Brooks committed to Michigan over offers such as defending national champion Villanova, Ohio State, N.C. State, Temple and Kansas State.

== College career ==
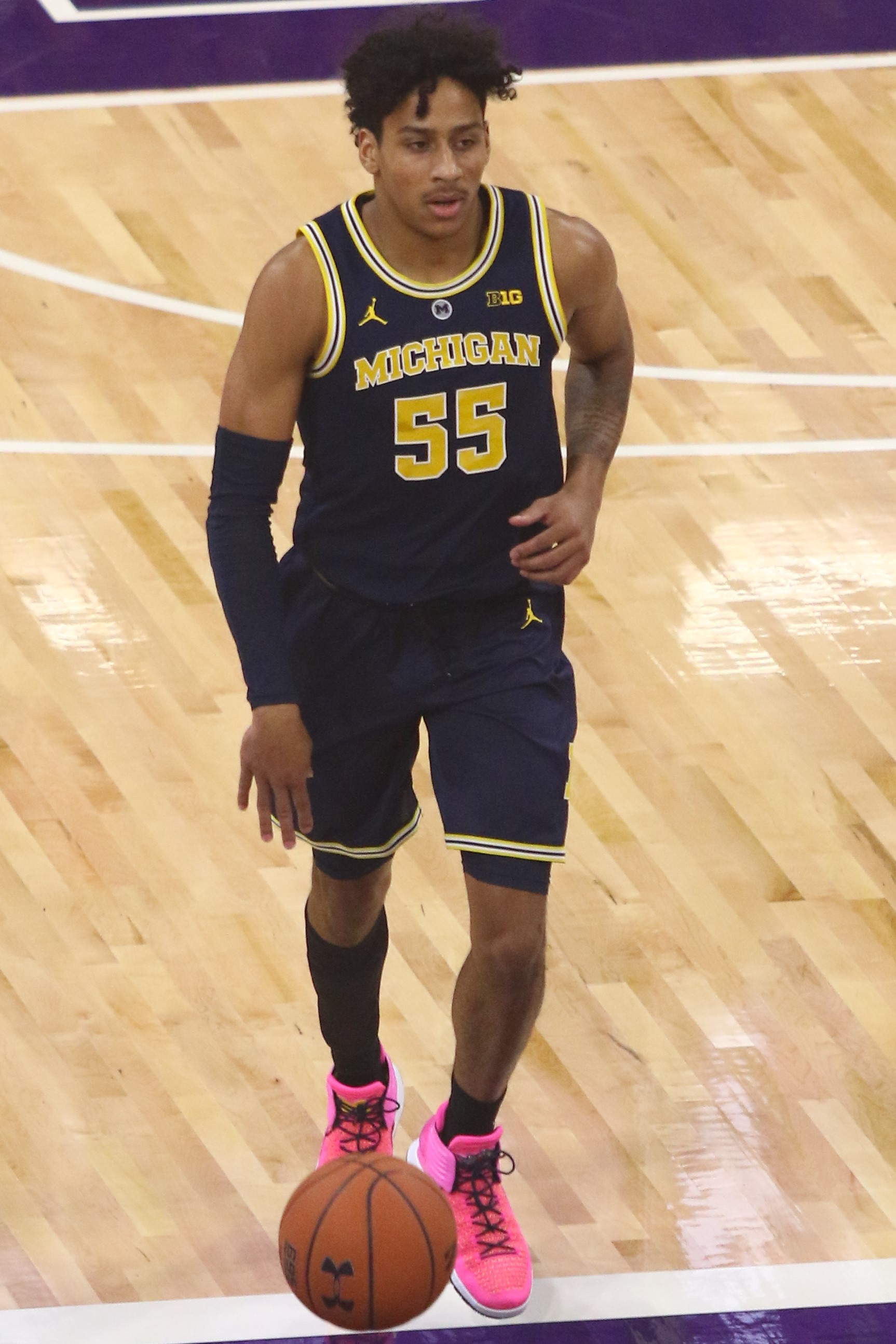
Brooks in 2018

Brooks started 12 games as a freshman. He averaged 1.8 points, 1.1 rebounds and one assist per game. As a sophomore, he averaged 2.5 points, 1.2 rebounds, and 1.1 assists per game. Following his sophomore season, Brooks considered transferring due to the departure of coach John Beilein. On January 17, 2020, Brooks scored a career-high 25 points in a 90–83 loss to Iowa. On February 27, he missed a game against Wisconsin due to a nose injury suffered several days prior. As a junior, Brooks averaged 10.6 points, 3.7 rebounds, and two assists per game.

Teammate Isaiah Livers called Brooks a "silent assassin," as he was known for leading by example. In the 2020–21 season, he averaged 9.5 points, 3.1 assists and 1.1 steals per game while shooting 39.6 percent from beyond the arc. His team reached the Elite Eight in the NCAA tournament. During the tournament, he was undecided on whether to come back for a fifth season or not due to the NCAA allowing seniors a one-time exemption to eligibility rules. Eventually, he decided to come back and play for one more season. Brooks was named Honorable Mention All-Big Ten by the media during his fifth season. With the COVID-19 exception, Brooks was able to play a fifth year and finished his career with a school record 158 games played. Brooks surpassed former teammate Zavier Simpson (146) for the record.

== Professional career ==
On June 24, 2022, Brooks signed an Exhibit-10 contract with the Indiana Pacers of the NBA. He was waived by the Pacers on October 15. On October 24, he signed with the Fort Wayne Mad Ants. Brooks averaged 6.9 points, 4.5 rebounds and 3.8 assists per game before an injury ended his season.

On July 27, 2023, Brooks signed with Pallacanestro Trieste of the Italian Serie A2. He averaged 14.5 points, 5.7 rebounds, and 3.3 assists per game.

On July 31, 2024, Brooks signed with EWE Baskets Oldenburg of the Basketball Bundesliga.

On July 7, 2025, he signed with Gladiators Trier of the Basketball Bundesliga.

On December 14, 2025, he signed with Bàsquet Manresa of the Liga ACB and EuroCup.

On June 10, 2026, he signed with Gladiators Trier of the Basketball Bundesliga (BBL).

== Career statistics ==
Legend
GP	Games played	GS	Games started	MPG	Minutes per game
FG%	Field goal percentage	3P%	3-point field goal percentage	FT%	Free throw percentage
RPG	Rebounds per game	APG	Assists per game	SPG	Steals per game
BPG	Blocks per game	PPG	Points per game	**Bold**	Career high

=== College ===
Year	Team	GP	GS	MPG	FG%	3P%	FT%	RPG	APG	SPG	BPG	PPG
2017–18	Michigan	31	12	10.0	.302	.244	.615	1.1	1.0	.4	.1	1.8
2018–19	Michigan	**37**	0	12.9	.378	.292	.750	1.2	1.1	.3	.1	2.5
2019–20	Michigan	30	30	32.0	.410	.364	.729	**3.7**	2.0	.8	**.2**	10.6
2020–21	Michigan	27	27	31.1	.426	**.396**	**.909**	3.1	**3.1**	1.1	**.2**	9.5
2021–22	Michigan	34	**34**	**36.0**	**.444**	.394	.877	**3.7**	2.9	**1.2**	.1	**12.8**
Career		159	103	24.0	.415	.362	.826	2.5	2.0	.7	.1	7.3

== Personal life ==
Brooks is the son of Kelly and James Brooks. He has a tattoo of Buddha on his left shoulder, as he studied Buddhism and practices meditation.
