= 2019–20 Michigan Wolverines men's basketball team =

American college basketball season

2019–20 Michigan Wolverines men's basketball

Battle 4 Atlantis champions
- Conference: Big Ten Conference
- Record: 19–12 (10–10 Big Ten)
- Head coach: Juwan Howard (1st season)
- Assistant coaches: Saddi Washington (4th season); Phil Martelli (1st season); Howard Eisley (1st season)
- Captains: Zavier Simpson; Jon Teske
- Home arena: Crisler Center

2019–20 Big Ten Conference men's basketball standings
	Conf.				Overall
Team	W		L	PCT	W		L	PCT
No. 17 Wisconsin	14	–	6	.700	21	–	10	.677
No. 9 Michigan State	14	–	6	.700	22	–	9	.710
No. 12 Maryland	14	–	6	.700	24	–	7	.774
No. 21 Illinois	13	–	7	.650	21	–	10	.677
No. 25 Iowa	11	–	9	.550	20	–	11	.645
Penn State	11	–	9	.550	21	–	10	.677
No. 19 Ohio State	11	–	9	.550	21	–	10	.677
Rutgers	11	–	9	.550	20	–	11	.645
Michigan	10	–	10	.500	19	–	12	.613
Purdue	9	–	11	.450	16	–	15	.516
Indiana	9	–	11	.450	20	–	12	.625
Minnesota	8	–	12	.400	15	–	16	.484
Northwestern	3	–	17	.150	8	–	23	.258
Nebraska	2	–	18	.100	7	–	25	.219
The 2020 Big Ten tournament was canceled prior to the second round due to the COVID-19 pandemic. Rankings from AP poll

The 2019–20 Michigan Wolverines men's basketball team represented the University of Michigan during the 2019–20 NCAA Division I men's basketball season. The Wolverines were led by first-year head coach Juwan Howard, following the departure of long-time head coach John Beilein. They played their home games for the 53rd consecutive year at the Crisler Center in Ann Arbor, Michigan. This season marked the program's 104th season and its 103rd consecutive year as a member of the Big Ten Conference.

== Previous season ==
The Wolverines finished the 2018–19 season 30–7, 15–5 in Big Ten play to finish in third place. They defeated Iowa and Minnesota in the Big Ten tournament before losing for the third time on the season to Michigan State in the tournament championship. They received an at-large bid to the NCAA tournament as the No. 2 seed in the West regional. They defeated Montana and Florida to advance to the Sweet Sixteen before losing to eventual National Runner-Up Texas Tech.

== Offseason ==
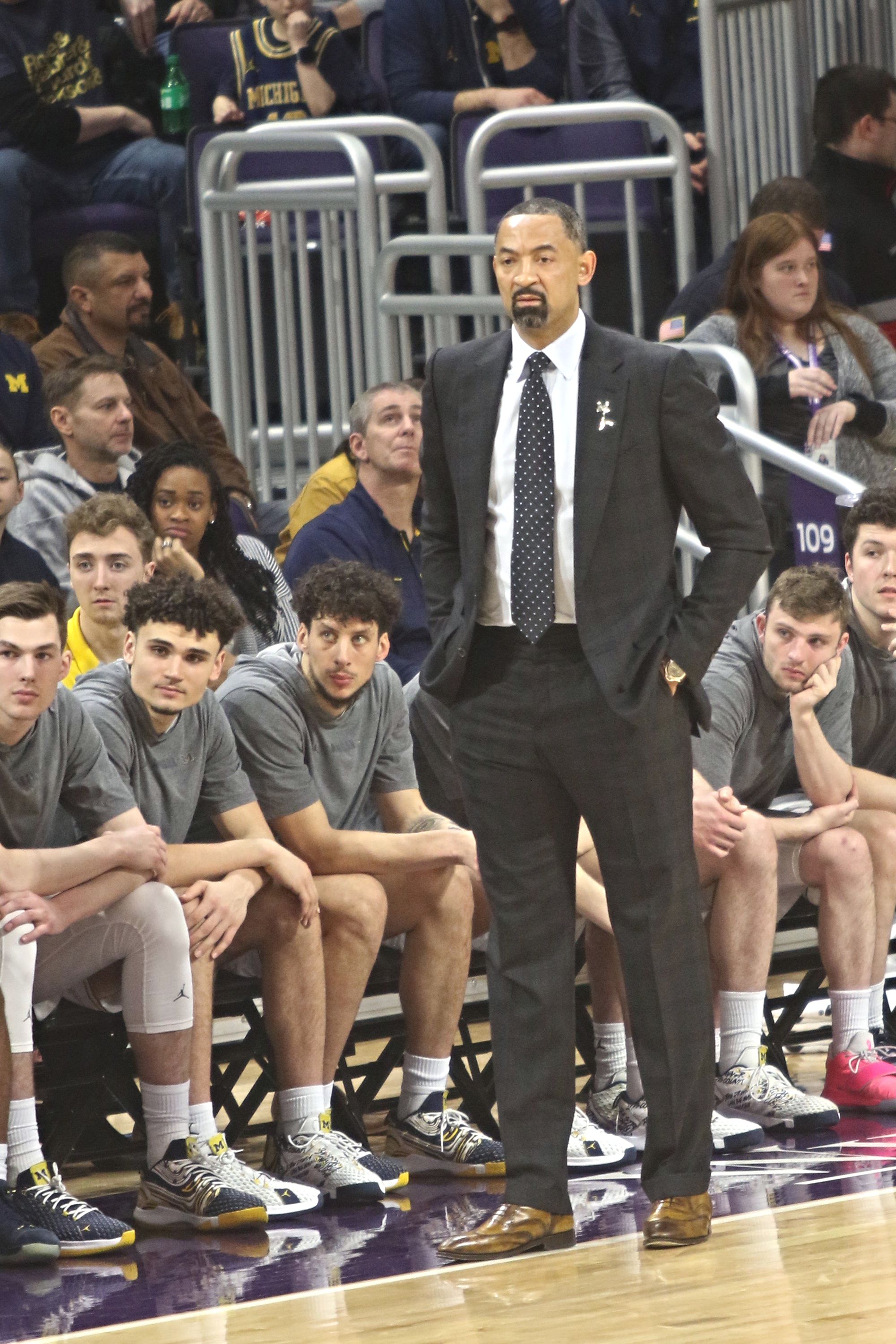
First-year coach Juwan Howard, February 2020

On May 13, 2019, it was announced that John Beilein was hired as the head coach of the Cleveland Cavaliers of the National Basketball Association (NBA). On May 22, the Wolverines named Juwan Howard head coach, agreeing on a five-year contract. It was announced on May 28, 2019 that assistant coach Luke Yaklich accepted an offer to join Shaka Smart's staff at Texas, effective May 31. DeAndre Haynes announced his departure on May 30 via Twitter. He was announced as a member of Mark Turgeon's staff at Maryland on June 10. Phil Martelli, former head coach at Saint Joseph's, joined Howard's staff as an assistant coach on June 3.

=== Departures ===
On April 9, 2019, Ignas Brazdeikis, Charles Matthews and Jordan Poole declared for the 2019 NBA draft with the intention of hiring agents.

Michigan Departures
Name	Number	Pos.	Height	Weight	Year	Hometown	Notes
Ignas Brazdeikis	13	F	6'7"	215	Fr	Mono, ON	Declared for NBA Draft
Jordan Poole	2	G	6'5"	195	So	Milwaukee, WI	Declared for NBA Draft
Charles Matthews	1	G	6'6"	205	RS Jr	Chicago, IL	Declared for NBA Draft

=== Expectations ===
Prior to the season, Simpson was named to the 10-man preseason All-Big Ten team. He was also named to the preseason Cousy Award 20-man watchlist, while Teske was named to the preseason Abdul-Jabbar Award 20-man watchlist. The team began the season unranked but receiving votes in the national polls. With the departure of Beilein and three starters from previous year, 2019 was expected to be a transition year under new head coach Howard.

=== Recruits ===
==== 2019–20 ====
After receiving an offer during an unofficial visit on May 13, 2018 Jalen Wilson became the first verbal commitment to the 2019 class on May 30, 2018. During the summer of 2018, Cole Bajema went from being unknown and unranked to being a top 60 recruit. After accumulating offers from San Francisco, Eastern Washington, Santa Clara, Pepperdine, Portland, Washington, Oregon State, Virginia and Xavier, Bajema committed to Michigan on August 4. On November 14, 2018, Wilson and Bajema signed their National Letters of Intent. As a senior, Bajema received first- and second-team all-state (WA) recognition. In the class 1A State Championship tournament, Bajema's undefeated defending champion Lynden Christian Schools team was upset in the quarterfinals, leaving it with a 24–1 record and snapping its 31-game winning streak, and he was named to the Class 1A All-tournament first team. Wilson was a Class 6A All-state (TX) selection. With the departure of John Beilein, Wilson requested for a release and re-opened his recruitment on May 16, 2019 and eventually committed to Kansas.

On July 6, 2019, new Wolverines head coach Juwan Howard announced that German shooting guard Franz Wagner, younger brother of former Wolverines star and current Washington Wizards player Moritz Wagner, had signed a financial aid agreement to join the team for the 2019–20 season. Franz Wagner was playing professionally with Alba Berlin of the Basketball Bundesliga before signing with Michigan. He averaged 3.8 points per game while shooting 38.3% from 3-point range in 56 combined appearances with Alba Berlin.

College recruiting
Name	Hometown	School	Height	Weight	Commit date
Cole Bajema; SF	Lynden, WA	Lynden Christian Schools	6 ft 7 in (2.01 m)	175 lb (79 kg)	Aug 4, 2018
Cole Bajema; SF	Recruit ratings: Rivals: 247Sports: ESPN:				
Franz Wagner; SG	Berlin, Germany	Alba Berlin	6 ft 7 in (2.01 m)	190 lb (86 kg)	Jul 6, 2019
Franz Wagner; SG	Recruit ratings: Rivals: 247Sports: ESPN:				
Overall recruit ranking:
Note: In many cases, Scout, Rivals, 247Sports, On3, and ESPN may conflict in their listings of height and weight.; In these cases, the average was taken. ESPN grades are on a 100-point scale.; Sources: "Michigan 2019 Basketball Commitments". Rivals.; "2019 Team Ranking". Rivals.

==== 2020–21 ====
On October 23, 2018, Michigan received its first class of 2020 commitment from four-star guard Zeb Jackson of Montverde Academy in suburban Orlando, Florida. Jackson had met assistant coach DeAndre Haynes when he was on the Toledo staff. On October 17, 2019, Michigan received its second commitment of the 2020 class and the first commitment of the Juwan Howard era, five-star power forward Isaiah Todd of Word of God Christian Academy in Raleigh, North Carolina. Todd is the highest-rated recruit to commit to Michigan since 2000. Howard then picked up his third commitment of the 2020 class in Hunter Dickinson a four-star Center out of Hyattsville, Maryland. On January 1, 2020, Terrance Williams, a four-star Forward out of Washington D.C. who de-committed from Georgetown in December 2019, became the fourth commit of the 2020 class. On January 20, Howard picked up his fifth commitment of the 2020 class, his son Jace Howard, a three-star small forward from Miami.

College recruiting
Name	Hometown	School	Height	Weight	Commit date
Zeb Jackson; SG/PG	Toledo, OH	Montverde Academy	6 ft 2 in (1.88 m)	160 lb (73 kg)	Oct 23, 2018
Zeb Jackson; SG/PG	Recruit ratings: Rivals: 247Sports: ESPN:				
Hunter Dickinson; C	Hyattsville, MD	DeMatha Catholic High School	7 ft 2 in (2.18 m)	255 lb (116 kg)	Dec 20, 2019
Hunter Dickinson; C	Recruit ratings: Rivals: 247Sports: ESPN:				
Terrance Williams II; PF	Washington, D.C.	Gonzaga College High School	6 ft 6 in (1.98 m)	215 lb (98 kg)	Jan 1, 2020
Terrance Williams II; PF	Recruit ratings: Rivals: 247Sports: ESPN:				
Jace Howard; SF	Miami, FL	NSU University School	6 ft 7 in (2.01 m)	200 lb (91 kg)	Jan 21, 2020
Jace Howard; SF	Recruit ratings: Rivals: 247Sports: ESPN:				
Overall recruit ranking: Scout: 4 Rivals: 4 ESPN: 4
Note: In many cases, Scout, Rivals, 247Sports, On3, and ESPN may conflict in their listings of height and weight.; In these cases, the average was taken. ESPN grades are on a 100-point scale.; Sources: "Michigan 2020 Basketball Commitments". Rivals.; "2020 Team Ranking". Rivals.

== Roster ==
2019–20 Michigan Wolverines men's basketball team
Players
Coaches

Pos.	#	Name	Height	Weight	Year	Hometown
G	0	David DeJulius	6 ft 0 in (1.83 m)	190 lb (86 kg)	So	Detroit, MI
F	2	Isaiah Livers	6 ft 7 in (2.01 m)	230 lb (104 kg)	Jr	Kalamazoo, MI
G	3	Zavier Simpson (C)	6 ft 0 in (1.83 m)	190 lb (86 kg)	Sr	Lima, OH
G	5	Adrien Nunez	6 ft 6 in (1.98 m)	210 lb (95 kg)	So	Brooklyn, NY
C	11	Colin Castleton	6 ft 11 in (2.11 m)	235 lb (107 kg)	So	Daytona Beach, FL
G	14	Rico Ozuna-Harrison (W)	5 ft 11 in (1.8 m)	175 lb (79 kg)	Jr	Detroit, MI
C	15	Jon Teske	7 ft 1 in (2.16 m)	265 lb (120 kg)	Sr	Medina, OH
G	21	Franz Wagner	6 ft 9 in (2.06 m)	205 lb (93 kg)	Fr	Berlin, Germany
F	22	Cole Bajema	6 ft 7 in (2.01 m)	175 lb (79 kg)	Fr	Lynden, WA
F	23	Brandon Johns Jr.	6 ft 8 in (2.03 m)	235 lb (107 kg)	So	East Lansing, MI
F	24	C. J. Baird (W)	6 ft 5 in (1.96 m)	225 lb (102 kg)	Jr	Novi, MI
F	32	Luke Wilson (W)	6 ft 0 in (1.83 m)	175 lb (79 kg)	Jr	Boulder, CO
F	44	Jaron Faulds (W)	6 ft 10 in (2.08 m)	240 lb (109 kg)	Jr	Holt, MI
F	51	Austin Davis	6 ft 10 in (2.08 m)	250 lb (113 kg)	Sr	Onsted, MI
G	55	Eli Brooks	6 ft 1 in (1.85 m)	185 lb (84 kg)	Jr	Spring Grove, PA

Head coach

- Juwan Howard (Michigan)

Assistant coach(es)

- Saddi Washington (Western Michigan)
- Phil Martelli (Widener)
- Howard Eisley (Boston College)

Legend

- (C) Team captain
- (S) Suspended
- (I) Ineligible
- (W) Walk-on
- Injured
- Current redshirt

Roster
Last update: November 27, 2019

== Rankings ==
Ranking movements Legend: ██ Increase in ranking ██ Decrease in ranking — = Not ranked RV = Received votes ( ) = First-place votes
	Week																			
Poll	Pre	1	2	3	4	5	6	7	8	9	10	11	12	13	14	15	16	17	18	Final
AP	RV	—	RV	RV	4 (9)	5	14	11	12	19	19	RV	—	RV	RV	RV	19	25	RV	RV
Coaches'	RV	RV^	RV	RV	5 (1)	7	15	15	13	19	20	RV	—	—	RV	RV	22	RV	RV	RV

^Coaches did not release a Week 2 poll.

== Regular season ==
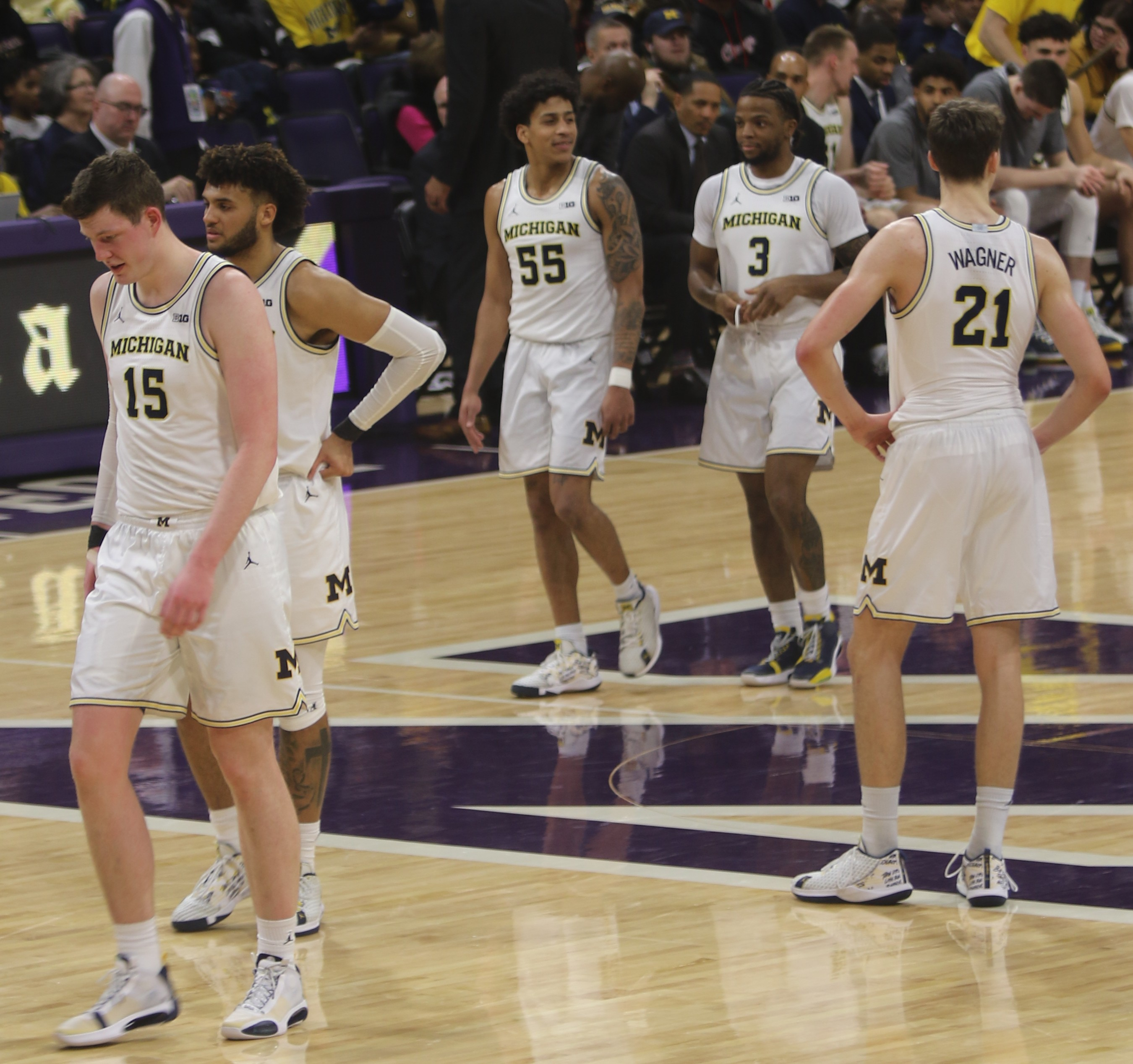
(left to right) Jon Teske (#15), Isaiah Livers (?), Eli Brooks (#55), Zavier Simpson (#3), and Franz Wagner (#21)

=== November ===
Michigan began the season with a 79–71 victory over Appalachian State. Michigan was led by Eli Brooks with a career-high 24 points, while Jon Teske added 17 points and a career-high 13 rebounds, for his 11th career double-double. Michigan's defense forced 19 Appalachian State turnovers. On November 12, Michigan defeated Creighton 79–69 in the Gavitt Tipoff Games. Michigan was led by Isaiah Livers with a then career-high 22 points, while Zavier Simpson and Teske added 17 points each. On November 15, Michigan defeated Elon 70–50. Michigan was led by Teske with 16 points, while David DeJulius added 10 points and eight assists, both career-highs, and Colin Castleton added a then career-high eight rebounds off the bench. On November 22, Michigan defeated Houston Baptist 111–68. Michigan was led by Livers with a career-high 24 points, while Simpson added 22 points and 14 assists, both career-highs, for his fifth career double-double. Michigan had its first 60-point half since 2013, also against Houston Baptist, and surpassed 100 points in a game for the first time since a 102–64 victory over Chaminade in 2017. Michigan's 111 points were the most points scored in a game since a 112–64 victory over Indiana in 1998.

On November 27, Michigan defeated Iowa State 83–76 in the quarterfinals of the Battle 4 Atlantis tournament. Michigan was led by Livers with 17 points, while Simpson added 10 points and a tournament-record 13 assists for his seventh career double-double, and DeJulius added a career-high 14 points. Freshman Franz Wagner made his season debut following injury, and finished with six points, three rebounds, and one block in 23 minutes. On November 28, Michigan defeated (#6 AP Poll/#4 Coaches Poll) North Carolina 73–64 in the semifinals of the Battle 4 Atlantis. Michigan was led by Brooks with a career-tying 24 points. Michigan used a 19–0 run early in the second half to secure the upset victory. On November 29, Michigan defeated (#8/#7) Gonzaga 82–64 to win the Battle 4 Atlantis. Michigan was led by Livers with a game-high 21 points, while Teske added 19 points, a career-high 15 rebounds and four blocks, and Simpson added 13 points and 13 assists for his third double-double of the season. Teske was named tournament MVP. On December 2, Teske was recognized as co-Big Ten Player of the Week, after he averaged 13.3 points, 9.7 rebounds and 3.3 blocked shots per game. As a result of their quality wins in the tournament, Michigan tied the 1989–90 Kansas Jayhawks for the largest jump in the history of the AP Poll as they jumped from unranked to number 4 in the 2019–20 basketball rankings.

=== December ===
On December 3, Michigan lost to (#1/#1) Louisville 58–43 in the ACC–Big Ten Challenge, as Michigan shot a season-low 37 percent from the field. Michigan was led by Teske with 18 points and 10 rebounds for his 13th career double-double, while Simpson added nine points and three assists, becoming the fourth player in program history to surpass 500 career assists. On December 6, Michigan defeated Iowa 103–91 in its Big Ten Conference season opener, as Michigan had six double-digit scorers, including all five starters. Michigan was led by Wagner with a career-high 18 points, while Simpson and Teske added 16 points each, Livers added 14 points, Brandon Johns Jr. added a career-high 12 points, and Austin Davis added a career-high eight points off the bench. This marked the first time Michigan surpassed 100 points in multiple games during a season since 2015–16, and the most points scored in a Big Ten game since 1998 (112 against Indiana). The 44 points by Iowa's Luka Garza are the most points ever surrendered to an opposing player at Crisler Arena and the most points by a Big Ten player since Glenn Robinson scored 44 for Purdue against Kansas in the 1994 NCAA Division I men's basketball tournament.

On December 11, Michigan lost to Illinois 71–62. Michigan was led by Teske with 16 points, while Livers and Brooks added 12 points each. Illinois led by as many as ten points in the second half. With less than three minutes to play, Michigan reduced the lead to four points, but Illinois went on an 8–0 run to secure the victory. On December 14, Michigan lost to (#10/#13) Oregon 71–70 in overtime. Michigan was led by Wagner with a career-high 21 points, while DeJulius added a career-tying 14 points off the bench. Oregon led by as many as 16 points in the first half; however, Michigan overcame an eight-point halftime deficit to force overtime. On December 21, Michigan defeated Presbyterian 86–44. Michigan was led by Brooks with a game-high 16 points, while Teske added 15 points and seven rebounds. Michigan's bench scored a season-high 41 points. Michigan's defense held Presbyterian to 44 points, the lowest total allowed by the Wolverines this season, including 28% shooting (17-of-60) from the field. On December 29, Michigan defeated UMass Lowell 86–60. Michigan was led by Teske with a career-high 25 points, while Simpson added 10 assists and nine points, one point shy of a double-double, and Castleton added a career-high nine rebounds off the bench. This was their first game without leading scorer Livers following a groin injury he sustained the previous week against Presbyterian.

=== January ===
On January 5, Michigan lost their rivalry game to #14/#16 Michigan State 87–69. Michigan was led by Teske with 15 points, while Simpson added 14 points. On January 9, Michigan defeated Purdue 84–78 in double-overtime. Michigan was led by Simpson with 22 points and nine assists, one assist shy of a double-double, while Teske added 18 points and nine rebounds, one rebound shy of a double-double. This was Michigan's first double-overtime game since 2015, and their first double-overtime victory since 2006. On January 12, Michigan lost to Minnesota 75–67. Michigan was led by Simpson with a team-high 19 points, nine assists, and six rebounds, one assist shy of a double-double, while Wagner added 17 points. On January 17, Michigan lost to Iowa 90–83. Michigan was led by Brooks with a career-high 25 points, while Wagner added 18 points and Teske added 14 points, a career-high seven assists and career-high four steals. With six assists in the game, Simpson moved into second place on Michigan's all-time assists list with 579. On January 22, Michigan lost to Penn State 72–63. Michigan was led by Simpson with 18 points, while Johns Jr. added a career-high 14 points and Brooks added 12 points. On January 25, Michigan lost to (#21/#22) Illinois 64–62 following a game-winning shot by Ayo Dosunmu with 0.5 seconds remaining in the game. Michigan was led by Simpson with 17 points, while Teske and Wagner added 12 points each. On January 28, Michigan defeated Nebraska 79–68. Michigan was led by Brooks with 20-points and nine rebounds, one rebound shy of a double-double, while Wagner posted 18 points and 8 rebounds and Johns Jr. added a career-high 16 points. Simpson was suspended one-game for an unspecified violation of team rules. This was the first game he missed in his career, ending his streak of 135 consecutive games played.

=== February ===
On February 1, Michigan defeated (#25/#25) Rutgers 69–63. Michigan was led by Johns Jr. with a career-high 20 points, while Teske added 13 points, Wagner added 11 points, and Simpson added nine points and 10 assists, one point shy of a double-double. On February 3, Wagner earned Big Ten Freshman of the Week recognition for his performance in the two previous games. On February 4, Michigan lost to Ohio State 61–61. Michigan was led by Simpson with 15 points and five assists, while Davis added a career-high 11 points, and Wagner added eights points and a career-high 14 rebounds. With his five assists in the game, Simpson became the second player in Michigan program history to surpass 600 career assists. On February 8, Michigan defeated (#14/#16) Michigan State 77–68. Michigan was led by Simpson with 16 points and game-high eight assists, including a season-high four three-pointers, while Livers added 14 points in his first game back since injuring his groin in December. On February 12, Michigan defeated Northwestern 79–54. Michigan was led by Brooks with 18 points, while Livers added 17 points. On February 16, Michigan defeated Indiana 89–65 as Michigan had five double-digit scorers. Michigan was led by Wagner with 16 points, while Simpson added 12 points and 11 assists, for his ninth career double-double. With the win, Simpson and Teske became the winningest players in program history with 105 career victories. Simpson also set a program record for the most games with 10 or more assists (15). On February 19, Michigan defeated Rutgers 60–52, giving Rutgers their first home loss of the season to end their 17–0 home win streak. Michigan was led by Simpson with 16 points, while Wagner added 12 points. Simpson became the fourth player in program history to surpass 1,000 career points and 500 career assists. On February 22, Michigan defeated Purdue 71–63. Michigan was led by Wagner with a career-high 22 points, while Livers added 19 points, and Teske added 11 points. This was the Wolverines' first win at Mackey Arena since 2014. On February 27, Michigan lost to Wisconsin 81–74. Michigan was led by Simpson with a career-high 32 points, six assists and five rebounds, while Wagner added 17 points.

=== March ===
On March 1, Michigan lost to (#23/#23) Ohio State 77–63. Michigan was led by Wagner with 18 points and 10 rebounds, for his first career double-double, while Simpson added 12 points and seven assists. On March 5, Michigan defeated Nebraska 82–58. Michigan was led by Livers with 18 points and ten rebounds, for his second career double-double, while Simpson added 11 points and 10 assists, for his tenth career double-double and Teske added 12 points, five rebounds, two blocks and two steals. On March 8, Michigan lost to (#9/#9) Maryland 83–70 in their final game of the regular season. Michigan was led by DeJulius with a career-high 20 points, while Wagner added 15 points and Simpson added 13 points. Michigan was scheduled to play Rutgers in the Big Ten tournament on March 12. However, the tournament and the remainder of the college basketball season was cancelled due to the coronavirus pandemic.

== Schedule and results ==
Date time, TV	Rank^{#}	Opponent^{#}	Result	Record	High points	High rebounds	High assists	Site (attendance) city, state
Exhibition
November 1, 2019*; 7:00 p.m., BTN Plus		Saginaw Valley State	W 82–51	–	20 – Livers	10 – Brooks	11 – Simpson	Crisler Center (12,585); Ann Arbor, MI
Regular season
November 5, 2019*; 7:00 p.m., BTN		Appalachian State	W 79–71	1–0	24 – Brooks	13 – Teske	6 – Simpson	Crisler Center (11,325); Ann Arbor, MI
November 12, 2019*; 6:30 p.m., FS1		Creighton; Gavitt Tipoff Games	W 79–69	2–0	22 – Livers	7 – DeJulius	9 – Simpson	Crisler Center (11,398); Ann Arbor, MI
November 15, 2019*; 7:00 p.m., BTN		Elon; Battle 4 Atlantis campus site game	W 70–50	3–0	16 – Teske	8 – Tied	7 – Simpson	Crisler Center (12,707); Ann Arbor, MI
November 22, 2019*; 7:00 p.m., BTN Plus		Houston Baptist	W 111–68	4–0	24 – Livers	12 – Teske	14 – Simpson	Crisler Center (12,707); Ann Arbor, MI
November 27, 2019*; 12:00 pm, ESPN		vs. Iowa State; Battle 4 Atlantis Quarterfinals	W 83–76	5–0	17 – Livers	7 – Simpson	13 – Simpson	Imperial Arena (1,531); Nassau, Bahamas
November 28, 2019*; 1:30 pm, ESPN		vs. No. 6 North Carolina; Battle 4 Atlantis Semifinals	W 73–64	6–0	24 – Brooks	8 – Teske	6 – Simpson	Imperial Arena (1,828); Nassau, Bahamas
November 29, 2019*; 2:00 pm, ESPN		vs. No. 8 Gonzaga; Battle 4 Atlantis Final	W 82–64	7–0	21 – Livers	15 – Teske	13 – Simpson	Imperial Arena (1,503); Nassau, Bahamas
December 3, 2019*; 7:30 p.m., ESPN	No. 4	at No. 1 Louisville; ACC–Big Ten Challenge	L 43–58	7–1	18 – Teske	10 – Teske	3 – Simpson	KFC Yum! Center (21,674); Louisville, KY
December 6, 2019; 6:30 p.m., FS1	No. 4	Iowa	W 103–91	8–1 (1–0)	18 – Wagner	8 – Johns Jr.	7 – Simpson	Crisler Center (12,707); Ann Arbor, MI
December 11, 2019; 9:00 p.m., BTN	No. 5	at Illinois	L 62–71	8–2 (1–1)	16 – Teske	7 – Teske	8 – Simpson	State Farm Center (13,277); Champaign, IL
December 14, 2019*; 12:00 p.m., CBS	No. 5	No. 10 Oregon	L 70–71 ^{OT}	8–3	21 – Wagner	9 – Johns Jr.	11 – Simpson	Crisler Center (12,707); Ann Arbor, MI
December 21, 2019*; 12:00 p.m., BTN	No. 14	Presbyterian	W 86–44	9–3	16 – Brooks	8 – Davis	9 – Simpson	Crisler Center (12,707); Ann Arbor, MI
December 29, 2019*; 2:00 p.m., FS1	No. 11	UMass Lowell	W 86–60	10–3	25 – Teske	9 – Castleton	10 – Simpson	Crisler Center (12,707); Ann Arbor, MI
January 5, 2020; 1:30 p.m., CBS	No. 12	at No. 14 Michigan State; Rivalry	L 69–87	10–4 (1–2)	15 – Teske	7 – Wagner	8 – Simpson	Breslin Center (14,797); East Lansing, MI
January 9, 2020; 7:00 p.m., FS1	No. 19	Purdue	W 84–78 ^{2OT}	11–4 (2–2)	22 – Simpson	9 – Teske	9 – Simpson	Crisler Center (12,707); Ann Arbor, MI
January 12, 2020; 1:00 p.m., BTN	No. 19	at Minnesota	L 67–75	11–5 (2–3)	19 – Simpson	6 – Simpson	9 – Simpson	Williams Arena (10,453); Minneapolis, MN
January 17, 2020; 9:00 p.m., FS1	No. 19	at Iowa	L 83–90	11–6 (2–4)	25 – Brooks	5 – Tied	7 – Teske	Carver–Hawkeye Arena (14,136); Iowa City, IA
January 22, 2020; 7:00 p.m., BTN		Penn State	L 63–72	11–7 (2–5)	18 – Simpson	11 – Teske	6 – Simpson	Crisler Center (12,707); Ann Arbor, MI
January 25, 2020; 12:00 p.m., FS1		No. 21 Illinois	L 62–64	11–8 (2–6)	17 – Simpson	8 – Wagner	3 – Simpson	Crisler Center (12,707); Ann Arbor, MI
January 28, 2020; 7:00 p.m., ESPNU		at Nebraska	W 79–68	12–8 (3–6)	20 – Brooks	9 – Brooks	4 – Brooks	Pinnacle Bank Arena (15,868); Lincoln, NE
February 1, 2020; 4:30 p.m., BTN		vs. No. 25 Rutgers; B1G Super Saturday	W 69–63	13–8 (4–6)	20 – Johns Jr.	7 – Tied	10 – Simpson	Madison Square Garden (13,127); New York, NY
February 4, 2020; 7:00 p.m., ESPN2		Ohio State	L 58–61	13–9 (4–7)	15 – Simpson	14 – Wagner	5 – Simpson	Crisler Center (12,707); Ann Arbor, MI
February 8, 2020; 12:00 p.m., FOX		No. 16 Michigan State; Rivalry	W 77–68	14–9 (5–7)	16 – Simpson	9 – Brooks	8 – Simpson	Crisler Center (12,707); Ann Arbor, MI
February 12, 2020; 9:00 p.m., BTN		at Northwestern	W 79–54	15–9 (6–7)	18 – Brooks	8 – Teske	7 – DeJulius	Welsh–Ryan Arena (6,054); Evanston, IL
February 16, 2020; 1:00 p.m., CBS		Indiana	W 89–65	16–9 (7–7)	16 – Wagner	8 – Wagner	11 – Simpson	Crisler Center (12,707); Ann Arbor, MI
February 19, 2020; 7:00 p.m., BTN		at Rutgers	W 60–52	17–9 (8–7)	16 – Simpson	8 – Wagner	5 – Simpson	Louis Brown Athletic Center (8,000); Piscataway, NJ
February 22, 2020; 2:00 p.m., ESPN		at Purdue	W 71–63	18–9 (9–7)	22 – Wagner	7 – Simpson	6 – Simpson	Mackey Arena (14,804); West Lafayette, IN
February 27, 2020; 7:00 p.m., ESPN2	No. 19	Wisconsin	L 74–81	18–10 (9–8)	32 – Simpson	7 – Wagner	6 – Simpson	Crisler Center (12,707); Ann Arbor, MI
March 1, 2020; 4:00 p.m., CBS	No. 19	at No. 23 Ohio State	L 63–77	18–11 (9–9)	18 – Wagner	10 – Wagner	7 – Simpson	Value City Arena (18,809); Columbus, OH
March 5, 2020; 6:30 p.m., FS1	No. 25	Nebraska	W 82–58	19–11 (10–9)	18 – Livers	10 – Livers	10 – Simpson	Crisler Center (12,707); Ann Arbor, MI
March 8, 2020; 12:00 p.m., FOX	No. 25	at No. 9 Maryland	L 70–83	19–12 (10–10)	20 – DeJulius	7 – Simpson	6 – Simpson	Xfinity Center (17,950); College Park, MD
Big Ten tournament
March 12, 2020; 12:00 p.m., BTN	(9)	vs. (8) Rutgers; Second round	Canceled due to the COVID-19 pandemic					Bankers Life Fieldhouse; Indianapolis, IN
*Non-conference game. ^{#}Rankings from AP Poll. (#) Tournament seedings in parentheses. W=West. All times are in Eastern Time.

== Honors ==
=== In-season honors ===
On December 5, Jon Teske was one of six Big Ten athletes named to the Oscar Robertson Trophy Watch List. On February 27, Zavier Simpson was one of 10 players named a semifinalist for the Naismith Defensive Player of the Year Award, and the lone Big Ten athlete. Following the season, Simpson was named a second team All-Big Ten selection by both the coaches and the media, while Livers was named an honorable mention, and Wagner was named an All-Freshman selection.

=== Team players drafted into the NBA ===
Franz Wagner was drafted 8th overall in the first round of the 2021 NBA draft by the Orlando Magic. Isaiah Livers was drafted 42nd overall in the 2021 NBA draft by the Detroit Pistons.

Year	Round	Pick	Overall	Player	NBA club
2021	1	8	8	Franz Wagner	Orlando Magic
2021	2	12	42	Isaiah Livers	Detroit Pistons
