= Spring Grove Area School District =

School district in Pennsylvania

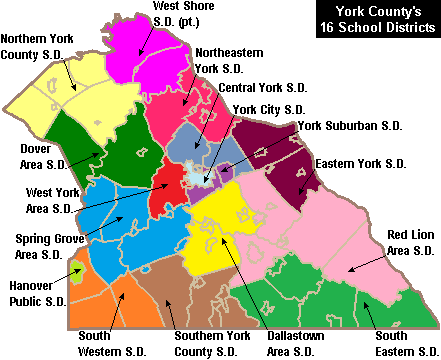

Address
- 100 East College Avenue Spring Grove, York County, Pennsylvania; United States

District information
- Type: Public
- Motto: Shaping the future, one student at a time!

Other information
- Website: sgasd.org

Spring Grove Area School District is a midsized, suburban, public school district located in Spring Grove, York County, Pennsylvania. It encompasses approximately 96 square miles (250 km^{2}). According to 2000 federal census data, it serves a resident population of 24,401. By 2010, the district's population increased to 27,417 people. In 2009, the district residents’ per capita income was $20,078, while the median family income was $52,385. In the Commonwealth, the median family income was $49,501 and the United States median family income was $49,445, in 2010.

== Schools ==
=== Elementary schools ===
Spring Grove Area School District currently operates three elementary schools.

- New Salem Elementary School
- Paradise Elementary School
- Spring Grove Elementary School

=== Middle school ===
Spring Grove Area School District currently operates two junior high school. Intermediate is 5th and 6th grade, middle is 7th and 8th.

- Spring Grove Intermediate School
- Spring Grove Middle School

=== High school ===
Spring Grove Area School District currently operates one senior high school.

- Spring Grove Area High School

== Extracurriculars ==
The district's students have access to a wide variety of clubs, activities and an extensive sports program.

Extracurricular activities available at Spring Grove include academics, such as Science Olympiad, Team America Rocketry Challenge, Student Launch Initiative, Envirothon, Vex Robotics, and Physics Olympics, and clubs, such as Key Club, GSA, Hacky Sack Club, Academic Booster club, Art Club, Book Club, Debate Club, Drama Club, Film Club, FBLA, Future Educators Club, History Club, Journalism, Link Crew, National Honor Society, Peer Mentoring, Physics Club, Power of One Club, Psychology Club, Project Harmony, Recycling Club, Rocket Scientists, SADD, Student Council, Ski Club, Spanish Club, Tech Squad, Tri-M Music Honor Society, Ultimate Frisbee, Yearbook, and York County Science and Engineering Fair.

=== Sports ===
The District funds:

Co-ed:

- Indoor Colorguard - KIDA
- Indoor Percussion - KIDA

Boys

- Baseball - AAAA
- Basketball- AAAA
- Cross Country - AAA
- Football - AAA
- Golf - AAA
- Lacrosse - AAAA
- Soccer - AAA
- Swimming and Diving - AAA
- Tennis - AAA
- Track and Field - AAA
- Volleyball - AAA
- Wrestling - AAA

Girls

- Basketball - AAAA
- Cheer - AAAA
- Cross Country - AAA
- Field Hockey - AAA
- Golf - AAA
- Lacrosse - AAAA
- Soccer (Fall) - AAA
- Softball - AAAA
- Swimming and Diving - AAA
- Girls' Tennis - AAA
- Track and Field - AAA
- Volleyball - AAA

Junior High School Sports

Boys

- Basketball
- Cross Country
- Football
- Track and Field
- Wrestling

Girls

- Basketball
- Cross Country
- Field Hockey
- Track and Field
- Volleyball
- Girls Wrestling

According to PIAA directory July 2012
