= Chaundee Brown Jr. =

American basketball player (born 1998)

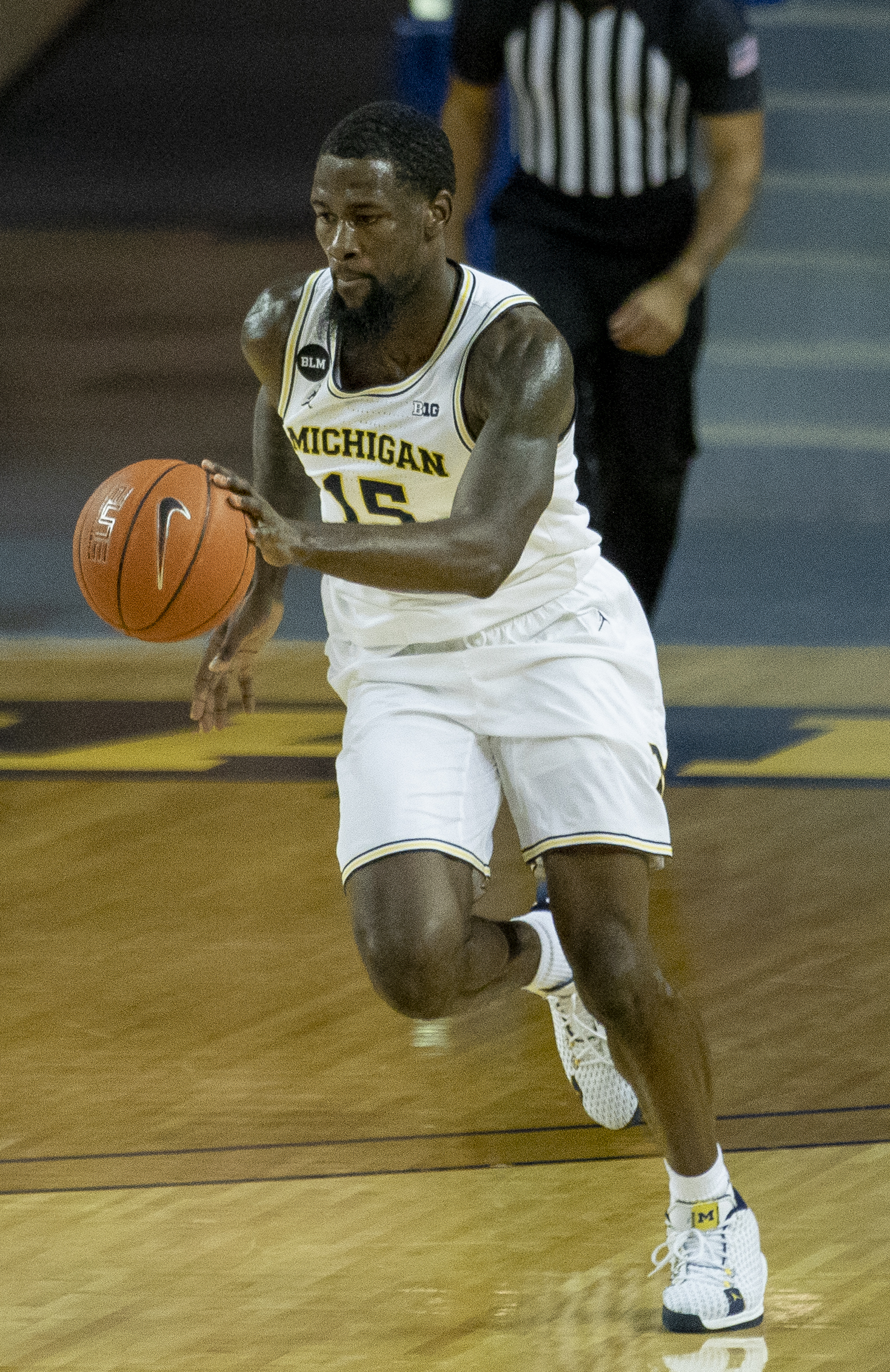
- Brown with Michigan in 2020

No. 15 – Fukui Blowinds
- Position: Small forward / shooting guard
- League: B.League

Personal information
- Born: December 4, 1998 (age 27) Orlando, Florida, U.S.
- Listed height: 196 cm (6 ft 5 in)
- Listed weight: 98 kg (216 lb)

Career information
- High school: Dr. Phillips (Dr. Phillips, Florida); The First Academy (Orlando, Florida)
- College: Wake Forest (2017–2020); Michigan (2020–2021)
- NBA draft: 2021: undrafted
- Playing career: 2021–present

Career history
- 2021: South Bay Lakers
- 2021: Los Angeles Lakers
- 2021: →South Bay Lakers
- 2021–2022: Atlanta Hawks
- 2022–2023: Austin Spurs
- 2023: Indios de Mayagüez
- 2023: Scarborough Shooting Stars
- 2023: SIG Strasbourg
- 2023–2024: Baskets Oldenburg
- 2024–2025: Kobe Storks
- 2025: New Taipei Kings
- 2026: London Lions
- 2026–present: Fukui Blowinds
- Stats at NBA.com
- Stats at Basketball Reference

Chaundee Dwaine Brown Jr. (born December 4, 1998) is an American professional basketball player for the Fukui Blowinds of the Japanese B.League. He played college basketball for the Wake Forest Demon Deacons and the Michigan Wolverines.

== High school career ==
Brown attended Dr. Phillips High School in Dr. Phillips, Florida and transferred to The First Academy in Orlando, Florida for his junior year. As a senior, he averaged 24.7 points and 6.7 rebounds per game. Brown was named Florida Gatorade Player of the Year and 4A Player of the Year. He committed to playing college basketball for Wake Forest over offers from Kansas, Indiana and Florida, among others. A four-star recruit, Brown became the program's highest-ranked commitment since Al-Farouq Aminu and Tony Woods in 2008.

== College career ==
As a freshman, Brown was a regular starter at Wake Forest, averaging 7.6 points and three rebounds per game. In his sophomore season, he averaged 11.9 points and 4.9 rebounds per game. Brown averaged 12.1 points and 6.5 rebounds per game as a junior. He was sidelined for eight games with ankle and calf injuries. For his senior season, Brown transferred to Michigan, choosing the Wolverines over Gonzaga and Illinois. He received a waiver for immediate eligibility from the NCAA. He averaged 8 points and 3.1 rebounds per game while shooting 41.9% from 3-point range. On April 10, 2021, Brown declared for the 2021 NBA draft forgoing an extra year of college eligibility.

== Professional career ==
=== South Bay Lakers (2021) ===
After going undrafted in the 2021 NBA draft, Brown signed with the Los Angeles Lakers on August 10, 2021. However, he was waived on October 15. On October 23, Brown signed with the South Bay Lakers as an affiliate player, playing one game.

=== Los Angeles Lakers (2021) ===
On November 16, 2021, Brown signed a two-way contract with the Los Angeles Lakers. However, he was waived on December 21, after making two appearances with Los Angeles.

=== Atlanta Hawks / Return to South Bay (2021–2022) ===
On December 27, 2021, the Atlanta Hawks signed Brown to a 10-day contract. After his deal expired, he returned to South Bay.

On April 9, 2022, Brown signed a two-way contract with the Hawks. On September 11, he was waived by the Hawks.

=== Austin Spurs (2022–2023) ===
On September 28, 2022, the Austin Spurs announced that they had acquired the returning right of Brown from South Bay Lakers for a first round pick in the 2023 NBA G League Draft and the returning player rights to Galen Robinson Jr. On October 24, 2022, Brown joined the Austin Spurs training camp roster.

=== Indios de Mayagüez (2023) ===
On April 19, 2023, Brown signed with Indios de Mayagüez of the Puerto Rican league. He was released on May 22 after appearing in 12 games and signed with Gigantes de Carolina on May 24, but left the team a day later.

=== Scarborough Shooting Stars (2023) ===
On July 19, 2023, Brown signed with the Scarborough Shooting Stars of the Canadian Elite Basketball League, making his debut two days later. On July 29, he was released from the club.

=== SIG Strasbourg (2023) ===
On July 22, 2023, Brown signed with SIG Strasbourg of the French LNB Pro A.

On June 13, 2024, Brown was selected by the Valley Suns in the 2024 NBA G League expansion draft.

=== New Taipei Kings (2025) ===
On August 21, 2025, Brown signed with New Taipei Kings of the Taiwan Professional Basketball League (TPBL). On January 12, 2026, the New Taipei Kings terminated the contract relationship with Brown.

=== London Lions (2026) ===
On January 10, 2026, Brown signed with London Lions of the Super League Basketball.

=== Fukui Blowinds (2026–present) ===
On July 28, 2026, Brown signed with the Fukui Blowinds of the Japanese B.League.

== Career statistics ==
Legend
GP	Games played	GS	Games started	MPG	Minutes per game
FG%	Field goal percentage	3P%	3-point field goal percentage	FT%	Free throw percentage
RPG	Rebounds per game	APG	Assists per game	SPG	Steals per game
BPG	Blocks per game	PPG	Points per game	**Bold**	Career high

=== NBA ===
==== Regular season ====
Year	Team	GP	GS	MPG	FG%	3P%	FT%	RPG	APG	SPG	BPG	PPG
2021–22	L.A. Lakers	2	0	10.5	.143	.000	–	1.0	.0	.0	.0	1.0
2021–22	Atlanta	**3**	**2**	**27.7**	**.360**	**.400**	**.833**	**4.7**	**1.3**	**.7**	.0	**9.7**
Career		5	2	20.8	.313	.333	.833	3.2	.8	.4	.0	6.2

=== College ===
Year	Team	GP	GS	MPG	FG%	3P%	FT%	RPG	APG	SPG	BPG	PPG
2017–18	Wake Forest	30	**29**	20.9	.411	.342	.806	3.0	1.1	.2	.2	7.6
2018–19	Wake Forest	**31**	**29**	**29.0**	.408	.323	**.840**	4.9	1.2	**.7**	.2	11.9
2019–20	Wake Forest	23	15	28.2	.456	.322	.831	**6.5**	**1.4**	.5	.1	**12.1**
2020–21	Michigan	28	1	20.6	**.488**	**.419**	.690	3.1	.6	.1	**.3**	8.0
Career		112	74	24.6	.435	.352	.812	4.3	1.1	.4	.2	9.8
