= Saddi Washington =

American basketball player and coach (born 1975)

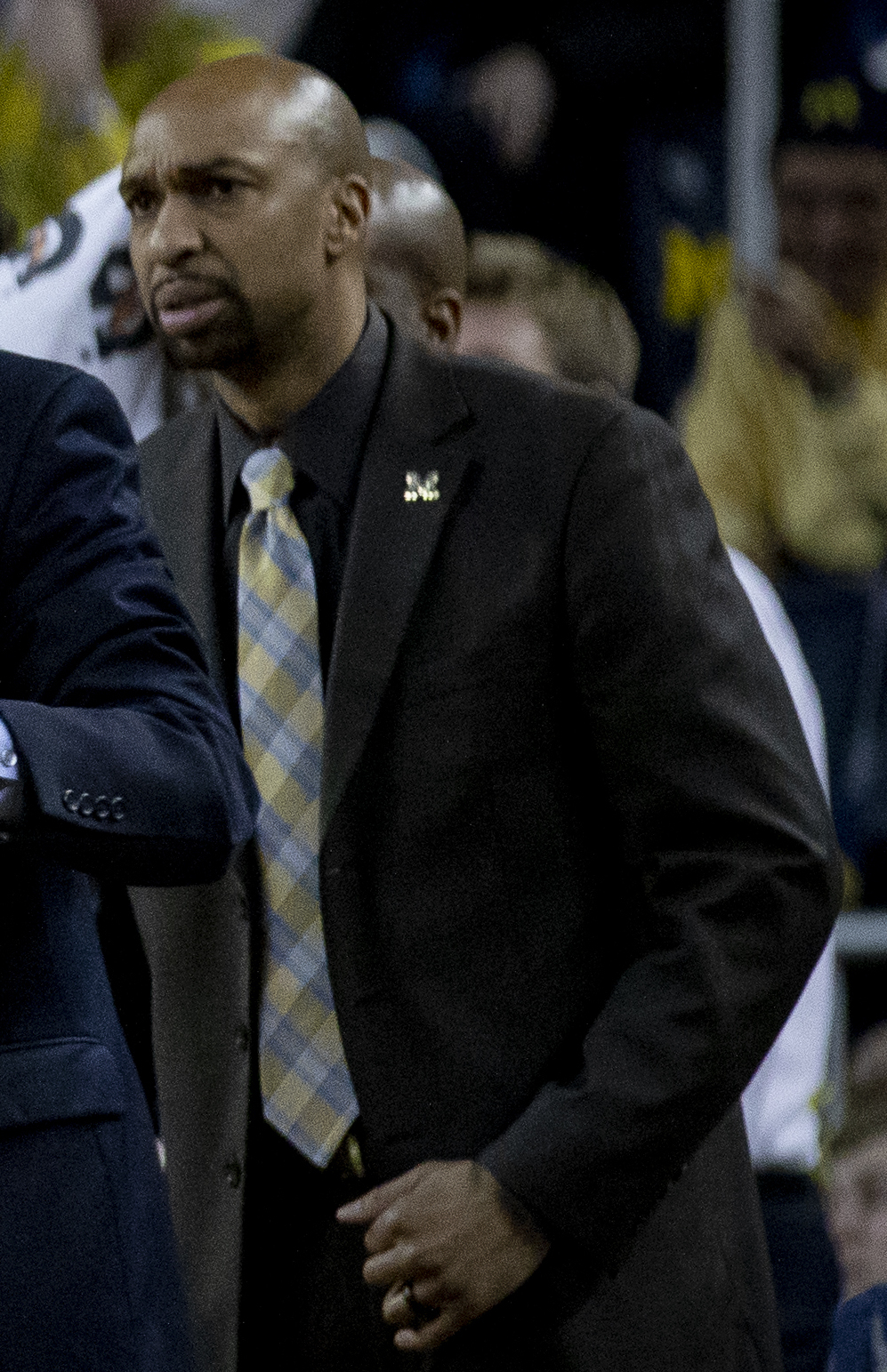
- Washington in 2019

Current position
- Title: Assistant coach
- Team: Michigan State
- Conference: Big Ten Conference

Biographical details
- Born: July 30, 1975 (age 51); Lansing, Michigan, U.S.

Playing career
- 1994–1998: Western Michigan

Coaching career (HC unless noted)
- 2005–2006: Romulus HS (volunteer)
- 2006–2013: Oakland (assistant)
- 2013–2016: Oakland (assoc. HC)
- 2016–2024: Michigan (assistant)
- 2024–present: Michigan State (assistant)

Accomplishments and honors

Championships
- As an assistant: 2× Big Ten tournament champions (2017, 2018); Big Ten Champions (2021, 2025)

Saddi Washington (born July 30, 1975) is an American college basketball coach and former player. He currently serves as a men's basketball assistant coach for the Michigan State basketball team. He played college basketball at Western Michigan. Before becoming a collegiate assistant coach, he was a volunteer coach at Romulus Senior High School under current Alabama head coach Nate Oats.

== Playing career ==
Washington attended Sexton High School, where he was a four-year letter winner in basketball and track, receiving all-state recognition in both sports in 1993. Following his high school career, he went on to start at Western Michigan. In 1994, he made the Mid-American Conference (MAC) All-Freshman team after scoring 14 points per game. He was a two-time All-MAC recipient in his career, including a first-team selection in 1998. He graduated with a double major in business management and marketing.

After graduation, Washington signed with the Utah Jazz and attended training camp in 1998. He attended training camps with Utah (1998 and 1999), the Denver Nuggets (2001) and the Atlanta Hawks (2004). Washington, however, never played a regular season game in the National Basketball Association.

== Coaching career ==
=== Early years ===
Washington started his coaching career by volunteering at Romulus Senior High School under current Alabama head coach Nate Oats. The team went 18–8 in 2005 with an 8–4 conference record. The season was lackluster compared to the previous season, where they had won a state championship.

=== College assistant coach ===
==== Oakland ====
In 2006, Washington joined longtime Oakland head coach Greg Kampe's basketball staff as an assistant. The team had a winning season every year from the year he got there, 2006, to 2012. On September 3, 2013, Washington was promoted to Associate Head Coach. From 2013 to 2015, the team improved on every single year.

==== Michigan ====
On May 4, 2016, Washington was announced as a new assistant coach on the Michigan basketball staff under former head coach John Beilein. He was responsible for coaching the big men, including Moritz Wagner and D. J. Wilson whom both became NBA first-round picks. He was retained under new head coach Juwan Howard in 2019.

In December 2020, Washington became the top ranked recruiter in the class of 2021 according to 247Sports Composite ranking for his involvement in the recruitment of five-star Michigan signees Moussa Diabaté and Caleb Houstan, along with four-star in-state Top100 Kobe Bufkin and Top100 point guard Frankie Collins.

On April 8, 2024, it was announced that Washington would not return to Michigan under new head coach Dusty May.

==== Michigan State ====
On June 5, 2024, Washington joined Michigan State as an assistant coach under Tom Izzo.

== Personal life ==
He is married to Dr. Channon Washington and has two children, Sidney and Caleb. Sidney competed two seasons at University of Pittsburgh Panthers as a member of their women's gymnastics team. She transferred to The Ohio State University and will compete with the Buckeyes for her final two years.
