= Spring Grove Area High School =

Location
- 1490 Roth's Church Road; Spring Grove, Pennsylvania 17362; United States
- 39°53′6″N 76°52′46″W

Information
- Type: Public secondary school
- School district: Spring Grove Area School District
- Principal: Christian Ehrhart
- Teaching staff: 76.83 (FTE)
- Grades: 9–12
- Enrollment: 1,198 (2023–2024)
- Student to teacher ratio: 15.59
- Colors: Royal blue, red and white
- Nickname: Rockets
- Website: sgahs.sgasd.org

Spring Grove Area High School is one of two, public secondary schools within the Spring Grove Area School District. The School is located in Spring Grove, York County, Pennsylvania, United States.

== Athletics ==
The School provides the following sports:

- Boys
  - Baseball - AAAAA
  - Basketball- AAAAA
  - Bowling - AAAA
  - Cross Country - AAA
  - Football - AAAAA
  - Golf - AAA
  - Lacrosse - AA
  - Soccer - AAA
  - Swimming and Diving - AAA
  - Tennis - AAA
  - Track and Field - AAA
  - Volleyball - AAA
  - Wrestling - AAA
- Girls
  - Basketball - AAAAA
  - Bowling - AAAA
  - Cheer - AAA
  - Cross Country - AAA
  - Field Hockey - AA
  - Lacrosse - AA
  - Soccer - AAA
  - Softball - AAAAA
  - Swimming and Diving - AAA
  - Tennis - AAA
  - Track and Field - AAA
  - Volleyball - AAA
  - Wrestling - AAAA

According to PIAA directory, 2023-24

== Notable alumni ==
- Eli Brooks basketball player
- Torren Ecker, State Representative (Adams-R) in the 193rd District
- Hali Flickinger, Olympic Swimmer
- Seth Grove, State Representative (York-R) in the 196th District
