= Spring Grove, Pennsylvania =

Borough in Pennsylvania, US

- Borough
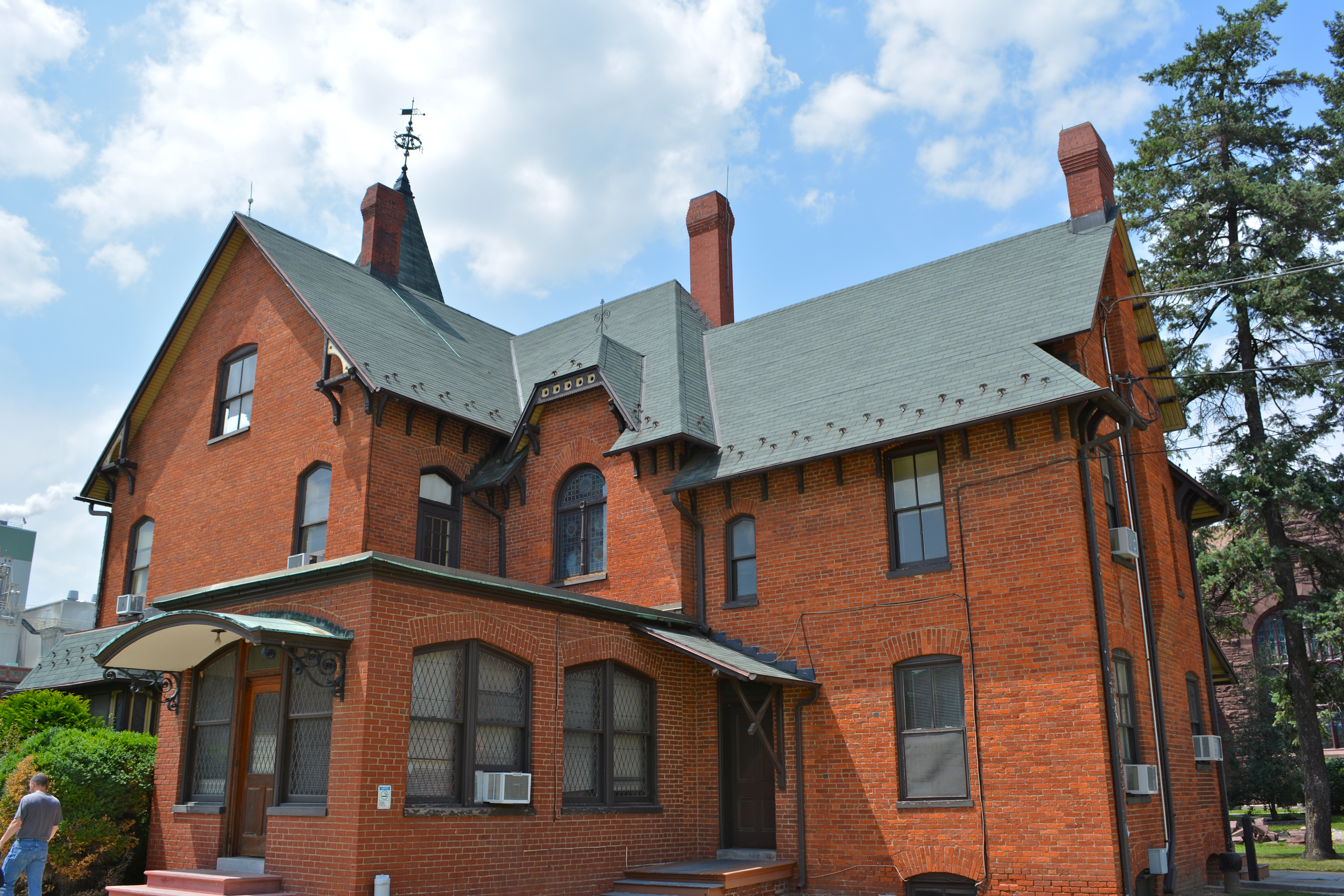
- Glatfelter House on Main Street

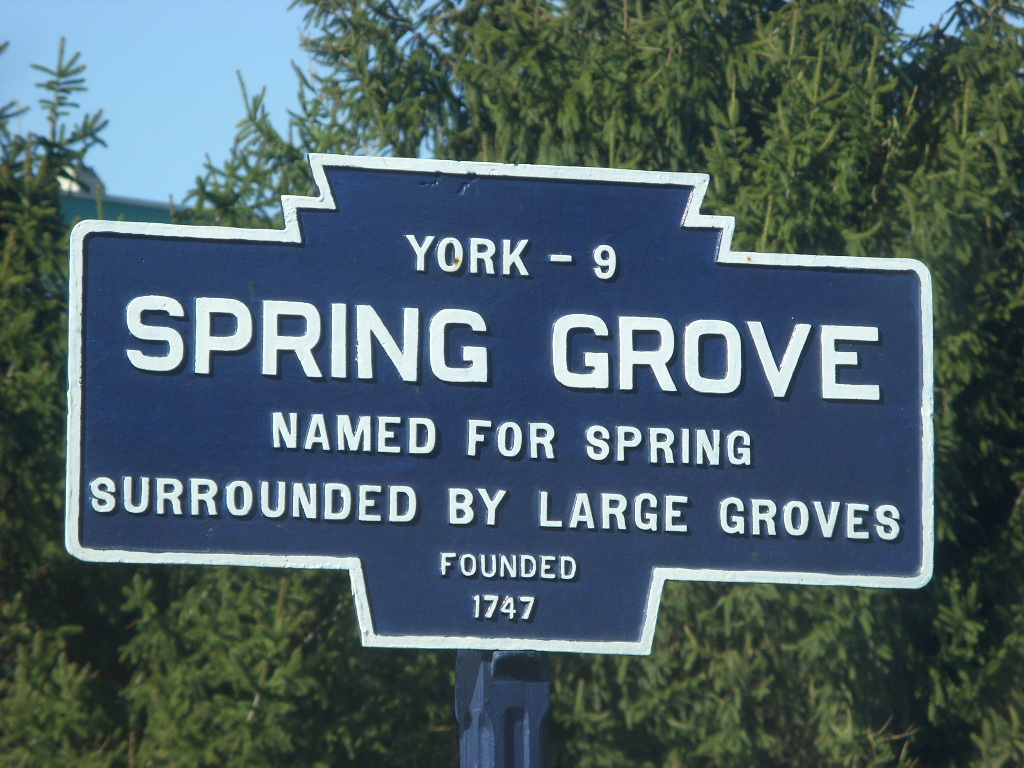
- Keystone Marker

- Location in York County and the U.S. state of Pennsylvania.

- Location of Spring Grove in Pennsylvania Spring Grove (the United States)
- Coordinates: 39°52′37″N 76°51′56″W
- Country: United States
- State: Pennsylvania
- County: York
- Settled: 1747
- Incorporated: 1882

Government
  - Type: Borough Council

Area
  - Total: 0.78 sq mi (2.03 km^{2})
  - Land: 0.78 sq mi (2.03 km^{2})
  - Water: 0 sq mi (0.00 km^{2})
- Elevation: 443 ft (135 m)

Population (2020)
  - Total: 2,372 ▲
  - Estimate (2021): 2,373
  - Density: 2,781.6/sq mi (1,073.97/km^{2})
- Time zone: UTC-5 (Eastern (EST))
  - Summer (DST): UTC-4 (EDT)
- ZIP Codes: 17354 and 17362
- Area code: 717
- FIPS code: 42-73192

Spring Grove is a borough in York County, Pennsylvania, United States. The population was 2,372 at the 2020 census. It is part of the York–Hanover metropolitan area.

== History ==
The site of Spring Grove was laid out in 1747 on the banks of Codorus Creek, midway between York and Hanover, by a surveyor for the Penns. Its growth since that time falls into two periods, each lasting approximately 100 years. The first witnessed development of the borough as an iron-making center. The second, which extends to the present day, is as a papermaking center. The businesses of both periods have relied on certain natural resources of the area.

Originally, Spring Grove was a part of Paradise Township and was contained within the boundaries of Lancaster County. York County was formed in 1749 and Jackson Township, including Spring Grove, in 1853. The residents of the community petitioned the County Court in 1882 for incorporation as a borough, and in August of that year their petition was granted. Since that time, the borough has grown in area as a result of annexation of the surrounding land, the largest annexation having taken place in 1953.

In the 1770s, attracted by the presence of water, iron ore and wood for charcoal in the Pigeon Hills, an iron manufacturer established a forge at "Spring Forge". It is known as Spring Grove. The early German and English woodchoppers who flocked to this first Pennsylvania iron industry west of the Susquehanna River were the forebears of today's community. By the mid-19th century, the manufacturing of iron had grown to a point where almost 200 short tons (180,000 kg) of iron bar were produced locally each year.

By 1851, however, the iron business had been suspended, and its buildings were converted to the manufacturing of paper. Once again local resources, wood and water, were largely responsible for the location of this industry in the Spring Grove area. Thirteen years later, the plant was purchased by P. H. Glatfelter for $14,000.

Other basic industries, such as brick-making and the manufacture of explosives, have from time to time established themselves in the borough. None, however, have remained as long nor have been as successful as the paper mill. Since 1865, the growth of the borough has reflected growth of the Glatfelter Paper Mill.

In August 2018, Glatfelter announced an agreement to sell its Specialty Papers division, which includes the Spring Grove mill, to private investment firm Lindsay Goldberg for $360 million, with the sale to close before 2019. In April 2025, mill owner Pixelle Specialty Solutions, which Lindsay Goldberg sold to H.I.G. Capital in 2022, announced a plan to close its paper mill in Chillicothe, Ohio, and move some operations to the Spring Grove mill.

The Spring Grove Borough Historic District was listed on the National Register of Historic Places in 1984.

== Geography ==
Spring Grove is located at 39°52′37″N 76°51′56″W (39.876827, -76.865536).

According to the United States Census Bureau, the borough has a total area of 0.8 square miles (2.1 km^{2}), all land.

== Demographics ==
Historical population
Census	Pop.	Note	%±
1880	208		—
1890	576		176.9%
1900	1,005		74.5%
1910	1,152		14.6%
1920	1,115		−3.2%
1930	1,236		10.9%
1940	1,259		1.9%
1950	1,238		−1.7%
1960	1,675		35.3%
1970	1,669		−0.4%
1980	1,832		9.8%
1990	1,863		1.7%
2000	2,050		10.0%
2010	2,167		5.7%
2020	2,372		9.5%
2021 (est.)	2,373	▲	0.0%

As of the census of 2000, there were 2,050 people, 817 households, and 570 families residing in the borough. The population density was 2,698.1 inhabitants per square mile (1,041.7/km^{2}). There were 848 housing units at an average density of 1,116.1 per square mile (430.9/km^{2}). The racial makeup of the borough was 97.56% White, 0.20% African American, 0.15% Native American, 0.63% Asian, 0.83% from other races, and 0.63% from two or more races. Hispanic or Latino of any race were 1.66% of the population.

There were 817 households, out of which 36.6% had children under the age of 18 living with them, 51.5% were married couples living together, 13.5% had a female householder with no husband present, and 30.2% were non-families. Of all households 25.6% were made up of individuals, and 11.0% had someone living alone who was 65 years of age or older. The average household size was 2.51 and the average family size was 3.01.

In the borough the population was spread out, with 27.3% under the age of 18, 9.6% from 18 to 24, 30.7% from 25 to 44, 20.4% from 45 to 64, and 12.0% who were 65 years of age or older. The median age was 34 years. For every 100 females there were 99.4 males. For every 100 females age 18 and over, there were 91.3 males.

The median income for a household in the borough was $42,609, and the median income for a family was $52,228. Males had a median income of $36,842 versus $25,714 for females. The per capita income for the borough was $20,124. About 2.9% of families and 5.8% of the population were below the poverty line, including 7.5% of those under age 18 and 5.0% of those age 65 or over.

== Education ==
Spring Grove Area School District currently operates three primary schools, an intermediate school, a middle school, and one secondary school in the Spring Grove area. The high school is called Spring Grove Area High School. A new high school was recently built closer to the middle and intermediate schools. The high school opened in 2008, and the 2009 class was the first class to graduate from the new high school.
