= 2019–20 Wisconsin Badgers men's basketball team =

American college basketball season

2019–20 Wisconsin Badgers men's basketball

Big Ten regular season co-champions
- Conference: Big Ten Conference

Ranking
- Coaches: No. 19
- AP: No. 17
- Record: 21–10 (14–6 Big Ten)
- Head coach: Greg Gard (5th season)
- Assistant coaches: Howard Moore*; Joe Krabbenhoft; Dean Oliver; Alando Tucker (interim)
- Home arena: Kohl Center

2019–20 Big Ten Conference men's basketball standings
	Conf.				Overall
Team	W		L	PCT	W		L	PCT
No. 17 Wisconsin	14	–	6	.700	21	–	10	.677
No. 9 Michigan State	14	–	6	.700	22	–	9	.710
No. 12 Maryland	14	–	6	.700	24	–	7	.774
No. 21 Illinois	13	–	7	.650	21	–	10	.677
No. 25 Iowa	11	–	9	.550	20	–	11	.645
Penn State	11	–	9	.550	21	–	10	.677
No. 19 Ohio State	11	–	9	.550	21	–	10	.677
Rutgers	11	–	9	.550	20	–	11	.645
Michigan	10	–	10	.500	19	–	12	.613
Purdue	9	–	11	.450	16	–	15	.516
Indiana	9	–	11	.450	20	–	12	.625
Minnesota	8	–	12	.400	15	–	16	.484
Northwestern	3	–	17	.150	8	–	23	.258
Nebraska	2	–	18	.100	7	–	25	.219
The 2020 Big Ten tournament was canceled prior to the second round due to the COVID-19 pandemic. Rankings from AP poll

The 2019–20 Wisconsin Badgers men's basketball team represented the University of Wisconsin–Madison in the 2019–20 NCAA Division I men's basketball season. The Badgers were led by fifth-year head coach Greg Gard and played their home games at the Kohl Center in Madison, Wisconsin as members of the Big Ten Conference.

With a win over Indiana on March 7, 2020, the Badgers earned a share of the Big Ten regular season championship. They finished the season 21–10, 14–6 in Big Ten play to finish in a three-way tie for first place. Their season ended following the cancellation of postseason tournaments due to the coronavirus pandemic.

== Previous season ==
The Badgers finished the 2018–19 season 23–11, 14–6 in Big Ten play to finish in fourth place. In the Big Ten tournament, the Badgers defeated Nebraska in the quarterfinals before losing to Michigan State in the semifinals. They received an at-large bid to the NCAA tournament as the No. 5 seed in the South Region, their 24th trip to the NCAA Tournament. They were upset in the First Round by No. 12-seeded Oregon.

== Offseason ==
=== Moore family car accident ===
In the early morning hours of May 25, 2019, assistant coach Howard Moore and his family were involved in a car accident near Ann Arbor, Michigan that claimed the lives of his wife Jennifer and daughter Jaidyn. Moore was hospitalized for several weeks with severe burns while his son Jerell escaped with minor injuries. After a setback in his home and subsequent stint in the ICU, 46-year-old Moore was moved to a long-term care and rehab facility in July.

On July 31, 2019, Wisconsin named all-time leading scorer Alando Tucker an interim assistant coach to fulfill Moore's coaching duties for the 2019–20 season. Tucker had been serving as the athletic department's director of student-athlete engagement. "Do Moore. Be Moore. 4 Moore" became the 2019–20 team's motto.

=== Departures ===
Name	Number	Pos.	Height	Weight	Year	Hometown	Reason for departure
Tai Strickland	13	G	6'2"	172	Freshman	Tampa, FL	Transferred to Temple
Charles Thomas IV	15	F	6'8"	250	Senior	Highland, MD	Graduated
Khalil Iverson	21	G/F	6'5"	217	Senior	Delaware, OH	Graduated
Ethan Happ	22	F	6'8"	237	RS Senior	Milan, IL	Graduated/Undrafted 2019 NBA draft
Taylor Currie	33	F	6'8"	226	Freshman	Clarktson, MI	Transferred to Mott CC

=== 2019 recruiting class ===
College recruiting
Name	Hometown	School	Height	Weight	Commit date
Tyler Wahl; SF	Lakeville, MN	Lakeville North High School	6 ft 7 in (2.01 m)	200 lb (91 kg)	Jun 21, 2018
Tyler Wahl; SF	Recruit ratings: Scout: Rivals: 247Sports: (N/A)				
Overall recruit ranking:
Note: In many cases, Scout, Rivals, 247Sports, On3, and ESPN may conflict in their listings of height and weight.; In these cases, the average was taken. ESPN grades are on a 100-point scale.; Sources: "2019 Wisconsin Commitments". Rivals.; "Men's Basketball Recruiting". Scout.; "ESPN- Wisconsin Badgers Men's Basketball Recruiting". ESPN.; "Scout.com Team Recruiting Rankings". Scout.; "2019 Team Ranking". Rivals.

=== 2020 recruiting class ===
College recruiting (2020)
Name	Hometown	School	Height	Weight	Commit date
Lorne Bowman; PG	Detroit, MI	St. Mary's Preparatory	6 ft 1 in (1.85 m)	180 lb (82 kg)	Nov 16, 2018
Lorne Bowman; PG	Recruit ratings: Scout: Rivals: 247Sports: (81)				
Johnny Davis; SG	La Crosse, WI	La Crosse Central High School	6 ft 5 in (1.96 m)	188 lb (85 kg)	Jun 15, 2019
Johnny Davis; SG	Recruit ratings: Scout: Rivals: 247Sports: (79)				
Jordan Davis; SF	La Crosse, WI	La Crosse Central High School	6 ft 5 in (1.96 m)	180 lb (82 kg)	Jun 15, 2019
Jordan Davis; SF	Recruit ratings: Scout: Rivals: 247Sports: (N/A)				
Steven Crowl; C	Eagan, MN	Eastview High School	6 ft 9 in (2.06 m)	210 lb (95 kg)	Sep 17, 2019
Steven Crowl; C	Recruit ratings: Scout: Rivals: 247Sports: (N/A)				
Ben Carlson; PF	Woodbury, MN	East Ridge High School	6 ft 9 in (2.06 m)	205 lb (93 kg)	Sep 18, 2019
Ben Carlson; PF	Recruit ratings: Scout: Rivals: 247Sports: (N/A)				
Overall recruit ranking:
Note: In many cases, Scout, Rivals, 247Sports, On3, and ESPN may conflict in their listings of height and weight.; In these cases, the average was taken. ESPN grades are on a 100-point scale.; Sources: "2020 Wisconsin Commitments". Rivals.; "Men's Basketball Recruiting". Scout.; "ESPN- Wisconsin Badgers Men's Basketball Recruiting". ESPN.; "Scout.com Team Recruiting Rankings". Scout.; "2020 Team Ranking". Rivals.

== Roster ==
2019–20 Wisconsin Badgers men's basketball team
Players
Coaches

Pos.	#	Name	Height	Weight	Year	Previous school	Hometown
G	0	D'Mitrik Trice	6 ft 0 in (1.83 m)	184 lb (83 kg)	RS Jr	Wayne High School (OH)	Huber Heights, Ohio
G	1	Brevin Pritzl	6 ft 3 in (1.91 m)	204 lb (93 kg)	RS Sr	De Pere High School	De Pere, Wisconsin
F	2	Aleem Ford	6 ft 8 in (2.03 m)	217 lb (98 kg)	RS Jr	Archer High School	Lawrenceville, Georgia
G	3	Walt McGrory (W)	6 ft 3 in (1.91 m)	205 lb (93 kg)	Jr	Edina High School	Edina, Minnesota
G	4	Carter Higginbottom (W)	6 ft 0 in (1.83 m)	187 lb (85 kg)	RS Fr	St. Ignatius College Prep (IL)	Chicago, Illinois
F	5	Tyler Wahl	6 ft 7 in (2.01 m)	214 lb (97 kg)	Fr	North High School	Lakeville, Minnesota
F	11	Micah Potter	6 ft 10 in (2.08 m)	248 lb (112 kg)	RS Jr	Montverde Academy/Ohio State	Mentor, Ohio
G	12	Trevor Anderson	6 ft 2 in (1.88 m)	200 lb (91 kg)	RS Jr	Stevens Point H.S./Green Bay	Stevens Point, Wisconsin
F	15	Courtland Cuevas (W)	6 ft 5 in (1.96 m)	190 lb (86 kg)	Jr	Madison East H.S.	Madison, Wisconsin
F	20	Samad Qawi (W)	6 ft 6 in (1.98 m)	195 lb (88 kg)	Jr	William Horlick H.S.	Racine, Wisconsin
G	23	Kobe King	6 ft 4 in (1.93 m)	205 lb (93 kg)	RS So	La Crosse Central High School	La Crosse, Wisconsin
C	30	Owen Hamilton (W)	7 ft 0 in (2.13 m)	266 lb (121 kg)	RS So	Prescott H.S. (WI)/Northern Illinois	Prescott, Wisconsin
G	31	Michael Ballard (W)	6 ft 4 in (1.93 m)	204 lb (93 kg)	RS Jr	Fenwick High School (IL)	Oak Park, Illinois
C	32	Joe Hedstrom	7 ft 0 in (2.13 m)	240 lb (109 kg)	RS Fr	Hopkins High School	Hopkins, Minnesota
G	34	Brad Davison	6 ft 4 in (1.93 m)	206 lb (93 kg)	Jr	Maple Grove High School	Maple Grove, Minnesota
F	35	Nate Reuvers	6 ft 11 in (2.11 m)	235 lb (107 kg)	Jr	Lakeville North High School	Lakeville, Minnesota

Head coach

- Greg Gard (UW-Platteville)

Assistant coach(es)

- Joe Krabbenhoft (Wisconsin)
- Dean Oliver (Iowa)
- Alando Tucker (Wisconsin)

Legend

- (C) Team captain
- (S) Suspended
- (I) Ineligible
- (W) Walk-on
- Injured
- Current redshirt

Roster

== Season Notes ==
=== Micah Potter's eligibility ===
A month before the season opener, the NCAA denied Wisconsin's waiver request to allow Micah Potter to compete during the fall semester, arguing he had not sat out a full year after enrolling at Wisconsin. Potter did not play during the 2018–19 season, but stayed in classes at Ohio State before transferring to Wisconsin for the spring 2019 semester.

"I don't understand why I am being punished additionally for doing what is encouraged of a student-athlete," Potter said in a statement released by UW. "The penalty of a third semester to what I have already sat out seems unjust."

Wisconsin continued to appeal Potter's case throughout November. After the final denial, Gard called the situation "unprecedented" and expressed frustration with the NCAA's inconsistency on transfer rulings. "I was hoping common sense would prevail in this," Gard said. "Unfortunately, it didn’t."

Potter made his Badger debut on December 21, 2019, against Wisconsin-Milwaukee after missing the first 10 games of the season.

=== Circumstances surrounding Kobe King transfer ===
On January 25, 2020, the day after a humbling loss to Purdue in which he was held scoreless, sophomore Kobe King informed coaches and teammates via text message that he intended to leave the team. At the time, King was Wisconsin's leading scorer (12.6 ppg) and second in minutes (28.9 mpg) in Big Ten games. King did not travel with the Badgers to Iowa City for the team's next game and publicly announced his decision to transfer two days later, citing unhappiness with the program. King originally committed to Bo Ryan and Wisconsin on September 16, 2015, and reaffirmed his commitment after Gard was hired.

In the aftermath of King's announcement, strength and conditioning coach Erik Helland self-reported an incident in which he repeated a "repugnant word" in front of several players while telling a story from his days on the Chicago Bulls training staff. King admitted mentioning the incident with UW officials during a January 31 meeting. Helland resigned on January 6, 2020, after an investigation by the university.

== Schedule and results ==
Date time, TV	Rank^{#}	Opponent^{#}	Result	Record	High points	High rebounds	High assists	Site (attendance) city, state
Exhibition
November 1, 2019*; 7:00 p.m., BTN Plus		Wisconsin–La Crosse	W 82–53		15 – Reuvers	8 – King	5 – King	Kohl Center (17,147); Madison, WI
Regular season
November 5, 2019*; 8:00 p.m., ESPNU		vs. No. 20 Saint Mary's; Sioux Falls Showcase	L 63–65 ^{OT}	0–1	22 – Reuvers	6 – Reuvers	3 – Trice	Sanford Pentagon (3,301); Sioux Falls, SD
November 8, 2019*; 7:00 p.m., BTN Plus		Eastern Illinois	W 65–52	1–1	18 – King	14 – Reuvers	4 – Davison	Kohl Center (17,106); Madison, WI
November 13, 2019*; 6:00 p.m., BTN		McNeese State; Legends Classic campus-site game	W 83–63	2–1	24 – Davison	4 – Reuvers	4 – Anderson	Kohl Center (16,816); Madison, WI
November 17, 2019*; 12:00 p.m., FS1		Marquette; Rivalry	W 77–61	3–1	15 – Tied	13 – Pritzl	4 – King	Kohl Center (17,287); Madison, WI
November 21, 2019*; 8:00 p.m., BTN		Green Bay; Legends Classic campus-site game	W 88–70	4–1	19 – Reuvers	8 – Trice	7 – Trice	Kohl Center (16,837); Madison, WI
November 25, 2019*; 6:00 pm, ESPN2		vs. Richmond; Legends Classic semifinals	L 52–62	4–2	17 – Reuvers	7 – Tied	5 – Trice	Barclays Center (6,812); Brooklyn, NY
November 26, 2019*; 4:00 pm, ESPN2		vs. New Mexico; Legends Classic	L 50–59	4–3	16 – Reuvers	7 – Trice	2 – Tied	Barclays Center (6,420); Brooklyn, NY
December 4, 2019*; 9:15 p.m., ESPN2		at NC State; ACC–Big Ten Challenge	L 54–69	4–4	13 – Ford	8 – Wahl	4 – Trice	PNC Arena (16,035); Raleigh, NC
December 7, 2019; 3:30 p.m., BTN		Indiana	W 84–64	5–4 (1–0)	24 – King	5 – Tied	4 – Trice	Kohl Center (17,287); Madison, WI
December 11, 2019; 6:00 p.m., BTN		at Rutgers	L 65–72	5–5 (1–1)	18 – King	5 – Tied	3 – King	Louis Brown Athletic Center (6,361); Piscataway, NJ
December 21, 2019*; 4:00 p.m., BTN		Milwaukee	W 83–64	6–5	31 – Trice	5 – Tied	5 – Davison	Kohl Center (17,030); Madison, WI
December 28, 2019*; 12:30 p.m., CBS		at Tennessee	W 68–48	7–5	21 – Trice	7 – Reuvers	3 – Tied	Thompson–Boling Arena (21,678); Knoxville, TN
December 31, 2019*; 6:00 p.m., BTN		Rider	W 65–37	8–5	15 – Reuvers	7 – Potter	7 – Trice	Kohl Center (17,287); Madison, WI
January 3, 2020; 6:00 p.m., FS1		at No. 5 Ohio State	W 61–57	9–5 (2–1)	17 – Reuvers	9 – Reuvers	2 – Tied	Value City Arena (19,049); Columbus, OH
January 8, 2020; 8:00 p.m., BTN		Illinois	L 70–71	9–6 (2–2)	21 – King	9 – Potter	4 – Trice	Kohl Center (16,108); Madison, WI
January 11, 2020; 1:15 p.m., BTN		at No. 20 Penn State	W 58–49	10–6 (3–2)	24 – Potter	13 – Tied	4 – King	Bryce Jordan Center (10,139); University Park, PA
January 14, 2020; 8:00 p.m., ESPN2		No. 17 Maryland	W 56–54	11–6 (4–2)	17 – Reuvers	5 – Reuvers	4 – Trice	Kohl Center (16,157); Madison, WI
January 17, 2020; 6:00 p.m., FS1		at No. 15 Michigan State	L 55–67	11–7 (4–3)	19 – Reuvers	7 – Reuvers	4 – Tied	Breslin Center (14,797); East Lansing, MI
January 21, 2020; 8:00 p.m., BTN		Nebraska	W 82–68	12–7 (5–3)	14 – Davison	10 – Trice	7 – Trice	Kohl Center (16,856); Madison, WI
January 24, 2020; 6:00 p.m., FS1		at Purdue	L 51–70	12–8 (5–4)	11 – Potter	4 – Davison	4 – King	Mackey Arena (14,804); West Lafayette, IN
January 27, 2020; 7:30 p.m., BTN		at No. 18 Iowa	L 62–68	12–9 (5–5)	16 – Trice	9 – Trice	6 – Trice	Carver–Hawkeye Arena (12,566); Iowa City, IA
February 1, 2020; 12:00 p.m., FOX		No. 14 Michigan State	W 64–63	13–9 (6–5)	15 – Reuvers	7 – Pritzl	5 – Trice	Kohl Center (17,287); Madison, WI
February 5, 2020; 8:00 p.m., BTN		at Minnesota	L 52–70	13–10 (6–6)	14 – Reuvers	15 – Potter	6 – Trice	Williams Arena (11,389); Minneapolis, MN
February 9, 2020; 12:00 p.m., CBS		Ohio State	W 70–57	14–10 (7–6)	19 – Pritzl	9 – Ford	8 – Trice	Kohl Center (17,287); Madison, WI
February 15, 2020; 1:15 p.m., BTN		at Nebraska	W 81–64	15–10 (8–6)	30 – Davison	10 – Ford	5 – Trice	Pinnacle Bank Arena (15,864); Lincoln, NE
February 18, 2020; 6:00 p.m., ESPN		Purdue	W 69–65	16–10 (9–6)	19 – Ford	7 – Ford	5 – Trice	Kohl Center (17,042); Madison, WI
February 23, 2020; 12:00 p.m., BTN		Rutgers	W 79–71	17–10 (10–6)	18 – Potter	9 – Potter	9 – Trice	Kohl Center (17,287); Madison, WI
February 27, 2020; 6:00 p.m., ESPN2		at No. 19 Michigan	W 81–74	18–10 (11–6)	28 – Trice	8 – Ford	4 – Tied	Crisler Center (12,707); Ann Arbor, MI
March 1, 2020; 5:30 p.m., BTN		Minnesota	W 71–69	19–10 (12–6)	20 – Davison	7 – Davison	6 – Trice	Kohl Center (17,287); Madison, WI
March 4, 2020; 8:00 p.m., BTN	No. 24	Northwestern	W 63–48	20–10 (13–6)	11 – Reuvers	8 – Tied	4 – Trice	Kohl Center (17,287); Madison, WI
March 7, 2020; 11:00 a.m., ESPN	No. 24	at Indiana	W 60–56	21–10 (14–6)	17 – Reuvers	11 – Potter	5 – Trice	Simon Skjodt Assembly Hall (17,222); Bloomington, IN
Big Ten tournament
Canceled
NCAA tournament
Canceled
*Non-conference game. ^{#}Rankings from AP Poll. (#) Tournament seedings in parentheses. All times are in Central Time.

== Rankings ==
Ranking movements Legend: ██ Increase in ranking ██ Decrease in ranking — = Not ranked RV = Received votes
	Week																			
Poll	Pre	1	2	3	4	5	6	7	8	9	10	11	12	13	14	15	16	17	18	Final
AP	—	—	RV	RV	—	—	—	—	—	RV	RV	RV	RV	—	—	—	RV	24	18	17
Coaches	RV	RV	RV	RV	—	—	—	—	—	RV	RV	RV	—	RV	—	RV	RV	24	19	19

*AP does not release post-NCAA Tournament rankings

== Player statistics ==
Individual player statistics (through 3/07/2020)
			Minutes		Scoring		Total FGs			3-point FGs			Free-Throws			Rebounds							
Player	GP	GS	Tot	Avg	Pts	Avg	FG	FGA	Pct	3FG	3FA	Pct	FT	FTA	Pct	Off	Def	Tot	Avg	A	Stl	Blk	TO
Anderson, Trevor	30	0	369	12.3	54	1.8	18	47	.383	7	25	.280	11	14	.786	6	33	39	1.3	37	4	1	16
Ballard, Michael	10	0	10	1.0	4	0.4	1	1	1.000	0	0	-	2	2	1.000	0	1	1	0.1	0	0	0	0
Cuevas, Courtland	6	0	6	1.0	1	0.2	0	1	.000	0	1	.000	1	2	.500	0	0	0	0.0	0	1	0	0
Davison, Brad	29	29	893	30.8	290	10.0	90	225	.400	45	124	.363	65	77	.844	15	109	124	4.3	55	23	0	25
Ford, Aleem	30	30	758	25.3	261	8.7	94	214	.439	40	117	.342	33	47	.702	37	98	135	4.5	33	15	12	30
Hedstrom, Joe	6	0	14	2.3	2	0.3	1	2	.500	0	0	-	0	0	-	1	1	2	0.3	0	0	0	1
Higginbottom, Carter	9	0	9	1.0	0	0.0	0	1	.000	0	0	-	0	0	-	0	1	1	0.1	0	0	0	1
King, Kobe	19	19	538	28.3	190	10.0	73	159	.459	7	28	.250	37	55	.673	22	32	54	2.8	30	10	6	29
McGrory, Walt	14	0	59	4.2	15	1.1	5	13	.385	2	7	.286	3	4	.750	2	7	9	0.6	5	1	0	1
Potter, Micah	20	3	359	18.0	205	10.3	73	137	.533	23	49	.469	36	42	.857	30	95	125	6.3	7	7	19	32
Pritzl, Brevin	30	7	807	26.9	240	8.0	79	203	.389	48	129	.372	34	40	.850	24	88	112	3.7	20	17	7	21
Qawi, Samad	7	0	7	1.0	0	0.0	0	1	.000	0	0	-	0	0	-	0	1	1	0.1	0	0	0	1
Reuvers, Nate	30	30	783	26.1	392	13.1	141	313	.450	30	87	.345	80	100	.800	34	103	137	4.6	18	15	56	46
Trice, D'Mitrik	30	30	960	32.0	289	9.6	99	264	.375	53	143	.371	38	51	.745	7	109	116	3.9	125	23	4	52
Wahl, Tyler	30	2	453	15.1	77	2.6	32	73	.438	6	26	.231	7	17	.412	32	43	75	2.5	31	20	5	31
Total	30	-	6025	-	2020	67.3	706	1654	.427	261	736	.355	347	451	.769	242	769	1011	33.7	361	136	110	300
Opponents	30	-	6025	-	1859	62.0	697	1687	.413	185	548	.338	280	410	.683	267	757	1024	34.1	333	152	85	333

Legend
GP	Games played	GS	Games started	Avg	Average per game
FG	Field-goals made	FGA	Field-goal attempts	Off	Offensive rebounds
Def	Defensive rebounds	A	Assists	TO	Turnovers
Blk	Blocks	Stl	Steals	High	Team high
