= 2019–20 Indiana Hoosiers men's basketball team =

American college basketball season

2019–20 Indiana Hoosiers men's basketball
- Conference: Big Ten Conference
- Record: 20–12 (9–11 Big Ten)
- Head coach: Archie Miller (3rd season)
- Assistant coaches: Tom Ostrom (3rd season); Bruiser Flint (3rd season); Mike Roberts (1st season)
- Captains: Devonte Green; Al Durham
- Home arena: Simon Skjodt Assembly Hall

2019–20 Big Ten Conference men's basketball standings
	Conf.				Overall
Team	W		L	PCT	W		L	PCT
No. 17 Wisconsin	14	–	6	.700	21	–	10	.677
No. 9 Michigan State	14	–	6	.700	22	–	9	.710
No. 12 Maryland	14	–	6	.700	24	–	7	.774
No. 21 Illinois	13	–	7	.650	21	–	10	.677
No. 25 Iowa	11	–	9	.550	20	–	11	.645
Penn State	11	–	9	.550	21	–	10	.677
No. 19 Ohio State	11	–	9	.550	21	–	10	.677
Rutgers	11	–	9	.550	20	–	11	.645
Michigan	10	–	10	.500	19	–	12	.613
Purdue	9	–	11	.450	16	–	15	.516
Indiana	9	–	11	.450	20	–	12	.625
Minnesota	8	–	12	.400	15	–	16	.484
Northwestern	3	–	17	.150	8	–	23	.258
Nebraska	2	–	18	.100	7	–	25	.219
The 2020 Big Ten tournament was canceled prior to the second round due to the COVID-19 pandemic. Rankings from AP poll

The 2019–20 Indiana Hoosiers men's basketball team represented Indiana University (IU) in the 2019–20 NCAA Division I men's basketball season. Their head coach was Archie Miller, in his third year as Indiana head coach. The team played its home games at Simon Skjodt Assembly Hall in Bloomington, Indiana, as a member of the Big Ten Conference. The season officially kicked off with the annual event, Hoosier Hysteria, on October 5, 2019.

The Hoosiers started off another strong campaign by going 11–1 before dropping back-to-back games in late December 2019 and early January 2020. During the bulk of the conference season, IU was able to win most of their home games (7–3), while stealing a few road games (2–8) to end their final season with an overall record of 20–12 and a conference record of 9–11. Indiana entered the Big Ten tournament as the 11 seed where they faced the 14th-seeded Nebraska Cornhuskers. The first-round matchup ended in an 89–64 IU victory, staging a second-round matchup with 6 seed Penn State. However, on the morning of March 12, 2020, the Big Ten Conference announced that it would be cancelling the remaining tournament games due to the COVID-19 pandemic. Following suit, that afternoon, the NCAA announced that it was cancelling all winter and spring championships. This announcement officially, and abruptly, ended the Hoosiers' season, where they were expected to make the NCAA tournament for the first time in four years.

== Previous season ==
Despite getting off to a strong start of 12–2, which included three conference wins, IU struggled mightily down the backstretch of the season. Riddled with injuries and the inability to shoot, the Hoosiers lost 12 of 13 games before turning things around and finishing the regular season with a four-game winning streak. Having put themselves back into the conversation for making the NCAA tournament for the first time in three years, the Hoosiers looked to knock off Ohio State in the Big Ten tournament. With a win, many bracketologists had IU safely in the field. However, the Hoosiers fell short and lost to Ohio State, 79–75. IU was deemed one of the Last Four Out in the NCAA tournament, so they earned 1 seed in the NIT, where they advanced to the quarterfinals before losing to Wichita State, 73–63. Thus, the Hoosiers' 119th season ended with an overall record of 19–16 and 8–12 in the Big Ten.

== Offseason ==
=== Departures ===
Indiana departures
Name	Number	Pos.	Height	Weight	Year	Hometown	Reason for departure
Romeo Langford	0	G	6'6"	215	Freshman	New Albany, Indiana	Declared for the NBA draft; selected 14th overall by the Boston Celtics
Johnny Jager	2	G	6'0"	185	Senior	Bloomington, Indiana	Graduated
Jake Forrester	4	F	6'8"	218	Freshman	Harrisburg, Pennsylvania	Transferred to Temple
Quentin Taylor	5	G	6'2"	185	Senior	Indianapolis, Indiana	Graduated
Juwan Morgan	13	F	6'8"	232	Senior	Waynesville, Missouri	Graduated
Zach McRoberts	15	F	6'6"	210	Senior	Carmel, Indiana	Graduated
Clifton Moore	22	F	6'10"	230	Sophomore	Horsham, Pennsylvania	Transferred to La Salle
Vijay Blackmon	24	G	6'2"	185	Junior	Fort Wayne, Indiana	Transferred to Lindenwood
Evan Fitzner	55	F	6'10"	225	Graduate student	San Diego, California	Graduated

=== Recruiting class ===
College recruiting
Name	Hometown	School	Height	Weight	Commit date
Armaan Franklin; SG	Indianapolis, IN	Cathedral High School	6 ft 4 in (1.93 m)	185 lb (84 kg)	Sep 6, 2018
Armaan Franklin; SG	Recruit ratings: Scout: Rivals: 247Sports: ESPN: (80)				
Trayce Jackson-Davis; F	Greenwood, IN	Center Grove High School	6 ft 9 in (2.06 m)	235 lb (107 kg)	Nov 30, 2018
Trayce Jackson-Davis; F	Recruit ratings: Scout: Rivals: 247Sports: ESPN: (94)				
Overall recruit ranking:
Note: In many cases, Scout, Rivals, 247Sports, On3, and ESPN may conflict in their listings of height and weight.; In these cases, the average was taken. ESPN grades are on a 100-point scale.; Sources: "2019 Team Ranking". Rivals.

== Future recruits ==
=== 2020–21 team recruits ===
College recruiting
Name	Hometown	School	Height	Weight	Commit date
Trey Galloway; SG	Culver, IN	Culver Academies	6 ft 5 in (1.96 m)	200 lb (91 kg)	Jul 26, 2019
Trey Galloway; SG	Recruit ratings: Scout: Rivals: 247Sports: ESPN: (80)				
Anthony Leal; SG	Bloomington, IN	Bloomington South High School	6 ft 5 in (1.96 m)	195 lb (88 kg)	Aug 9, 2019
Anthony Leal; SG	Recruit ratings: Scout: Rivals: 247Sports: ESPN: (80)				
Jordan Geronimo; F	Concord, NH	St. Paul's School	6 ft 6 in (1.98 m)	195 lb (88 kg)	Sep 2, 2019
Jordan Geronimo; F	Recruit ratings: Scout: Rivals: 247Sports: ESPN: (80)				
Khristian Lander; PG	Evansville, IN	FJ Reitz High School	6 ft 2 in (1.88 m)	165 lb (75 kg)	Feb 25, 2020
Khristian Lander; PG	Recruit ratings: Scout: Rivals: 247Sports: ESPN: (93)				
Overall recruit ranking:
Note: In many cases, Scout, Rivals, 247Sports, On3, and ESPN may conflict in their listings of height and weight.; In these cases, the average was taken. ESPN grades are on a 100-point scale.; Sources: "2020 Team Ranking". Rivals.

== Roster ==
2019–20 Indiana Hoosiers men's basketball team
Players
Coaches

Pos.	#	Name	Height	Weight	Year	Previous school	Hometown
G	0	Cooper Bybee (W)	6 ft 1 in (1.85 m)	185 lb (84 kg)	Jr	Edgewood/Olney Central	Ellettsville, Indiana
G	1	Al Durham (C)	6 ft 4 in (1.93 m)	185 lb (84 kg)	Jr	Berkmar	Lilburn, Georgia
G	2	Armaan Franklin	6 ft 4 in (1.93 m)	195 lb (88 kg)	Fr	Cathedral	Indianapolis, Indiana
F	3	Justin Smith	6 ft 7 in (2.01 m)	230 lb (104 kg)	Jr	Stevenson	Buffalo Grove, Illinois
F	4	Trayce Jackson-Davis	6 ft 9 in (2.06 m)	245 lb (111 kg)	Fr	Center Grove	Greenwood, Indiana
G	5	Michael Shipp (W)	6 ft 3 in (1.91 m)	185 lb (84 kg)	Fr	Moeller	Cincinnati, Ohio
G	10	Rob Phinisee	6 ft 1 in (1.85 m)	190 lb (86 kg)	So	McCutcheon	Lafayette, Indiana
G	11	Devonte Green (C)	6 ft 3 in (1.91 m)	185 lb (84 kg)	Sr	Long Island Lutheran	North Babylon, New York
F	14	Nathan Childress (W)	6 ft 6 in (1.98 m)	210 lb (95 kg)	Fr	Zionsville	Zionsville, Indiana
G	15	Adrian Chapman (W)	6 ft 2 in (1.88 m)	190 lb (86 kg)	Sr	Brownsburg	Brownsburg, Indiana
F	20	De'Ron Davis	6 ft 10 in (2.08 m)	255 lb (116 kg)	Sr	Overland	Aurora, Colorado
F	21	Jerome Hunter	6 ft 7 in (2.01 m)	220 lb (100 kg)	RS Fr	Pickerington North	Pickerington, Ohio
G	22	Jacquez Henderson (W)	6 ft 0 in (1.83 m)	185 lb (84 kg)	Jr	The Geneva School/Louisville	Winter Park, Florida
F	23	Damezi Anderson	6 ft 7 in (2.01 m)	225 lb (102 kg)	So	Riley	South Bend, Indiana
F	25	Race Thompson	6 ft 8 in (2.03 m)	235 lb (107 kg)	RS So	Armstrong	Plymouth, Minnesota
C	50	Joey Brunk	6 ft 11 in (2.11 m)	245 lb (111 kg)	RS Jr	Southport/Butler	Indianapolis, Indiana

Head coach

- Archie Miller (NC State)

Assistant coach(es)

- Tom Ostrom (Minnesota)
- Bruiser Flint (Saint Joseph's)
- Mike Roberts (Indiana)

Legend

- (C) Team captain
- (S) Suspended
- (I) Ineligible
- (W) Walk-on
- Injured
- Current redshirt

Roster
Last update: 15-02-2024

== Depth chart ==
Pos.	Starting 5	Bench 1	Bench 2	Bench 3
C	Joey Brunk	De'Ron Davis
PF	Trayce Jackson-Davis	Race Thompson
SF	Justin Smith	Jerome Hunter	Damezi Anderson	Nathan Childress
SG	Al Durham	Devonte Green	Adrian Chapman	Michael Shipp
PG	Rob Phinisee	Armaan Franklin	Cooper Bybee	Jacquez Henderson

== Schedule and results ==
Date time, TV	Rank^{#}	Opponent^{#}	Result	Record	High points	High rebounds	High assists	Site (attendance) city, state
Exhibition
October 29, 2019*; 7:00 pm, BTN Plus		Gannon	W 84–54	–	18 – Smith	9 – Jackson-Davis	4 – Tied	Simon Skjodt Assembly Hall (N/A); Bloomington, IN
Regular season
November 5, 2019*; 7:00 pm, BTN Plus		Western Illinois	W 98–65	1–0	24 – Smith	7 – Tied	8 – Franklin	Simon Skjodt Assembly Hall (17,222); Bloomington, IN
November 9, 2019*; 2:00 pm, BTN Plus		Portland State	W 85–74	2–0	18 – Durham	10 – Jackson-Davis	7 – Phinisee	Simon Skjodt Assembly Hall (17,222); Bloomington, IN
November 12, 2019*; 7:00 pm, BTN		North Alabama	W 91–65	3–0	20 – Jackson-Davis	8 – Jackson-Davis	6 – Phinisee	Simon Skjodt Assembly Hall (17,222); Bloomington, IN
November 16, 2019*; 8:00 pm, BTN		Troy; Indiana Challenge	W 100–62	4–0	22 – Smith	14 – Jackson-Davis	4 – Tied	Simon Skjodt Assembly Hall (17,222); Bloomington, IN
November 20, 2019*; 7:00 pm, BTN		Princeton; Indiana Challenge	W 79–54	5–0	16 – Tied	8 – Brunk	6 – Durham	Simon Skjodt Assembly Hall (17,222); Bloomington, IN
November 25, 2019*; 8:30 pm, BTN		Louisiana Tech; Indiana Challenge	W 88–75	6–0	21 – Jackson-Davis	11 – Jackson-Davis	4 – Tied	Simon Skjodt Assembly Hall (11,930); Bloomington, IN
November 30, 2019*; 4:00 pm, BTN Plus		South Dakota State; Indiana Challenge	W 64–50	7–0	19 – Jackson-Davis	14 – Jackson-Davis	4 – Franklin	Simon Skjodt Assembly Hall (12,562); Bloomington, IN
December 3, 2019*; 9:00 pm, ESPN2		No. 17 Florida State; ACC–Big Ten Challenge	W 80–64	8–0	30 – Green	8 – Jackson-Davis	4 – Durham	Simon Skjodt Assembly Hall (17,222); Bloomington, IN
December 7, 2019; 4:30 pm, BTN		at Wisconsin	L 64–84	8–1 (0–1)	17 – Durham	6 – Brunk	3 – Green	Kohl Center (17,287); Madison, WI
December 10, 2019*; 9:00 pm, ESPN		vs. UConn; Jimmy V Classic	W 57–54	9–1	9 – Tied	7 – Jackson-Davis	3 – Tied	Madison Square Garden (10,945); New York City, NY
December 13, 2019; 8:00 pm, BTN		Nebraska	W 96–90 ^{OT}	10–1 (1–1)	25 – Jackson-Davis	15 – Jackson-Davis	4 – Phinisee	Simon Skjodt Assembly Hall (17,222); Bloomington, IN
December 21, 2019*; 12:00 pm, ESPN		vs. Notre Dame; Crossroads Classic	W 62–60	11–1	17 – Franklin	14 – Brunk	4 – Durham	Bankers Life Fieldhouse (18,538); Indianapolis, IN
December 29, 2019*; 6:00 pm, BTN		Arkansas	L 64–71	11–2	20 – Jackson-Davis	9 – Brunk	3 – Green	Simon Skjodt Assembly Hall (14,892); Bloomington, IN
January 4, 2020; 12:00 pm, FOX		at No. 15 Maryland	L 59–75	11–3 (1–2)	18 – Green	10 – Brunk	2 – Tied	Xfinity Center (16,631); College Park, MD
January 8, 2020; 7:00 pm, BTN		Northwestern	W 66–62	12–3 (2–2)	21 – Jackson-Davis	12 – Brunk	4 – Durham	Simon Skjodt Assembly Hall (13,751); Bloomington, IN
January 11, 2020; 12:00 pm, FOX		No. 11 Ohio State	W 66–54	13–3 (3–2)	19 – Green	7 – Phinisee	3 – Smith	Simon Skjodt Assembly Hall (15,456); Bloomington, IN
January 15, 2020; 7:00 pm, BTN		at Rutgers	L 50–59	13–4 (3–3)	15 – Smith	10 – Brunk	2 – Durham	Louis Brown Athletic Center (8,000); Piscataway, NJ
January 18, 2020; 7:00 pm, BTN		at Nebraska	W 82–74	14–4 (4–3)	18 – Jackson-Davis	13 – Jackson-Davis	4 – Tied	Pinnacle Bank Arena (15,925); Lincoln, NE
January 23, 2020; 8:30 pm, FS1		No. 11 Michigan State	W 67–63	15–4 (5–3)	14 – Brunk	6 – Brunk	4 – Phinisee	Simon Skjodt Assembly Hall (17,222); Bloomington, IN
January 26, 2020; 1:00 pm, CBS		No. 17 Maryland	L 76–77	15–5 (5–4)	16 – Green	8 – Tied	7 – Phinisee	Simon Skjodt Assembly Hall (17,222); Bloomington, IN
January 29, 2020; 8:30 pm, BTN		at No. 24 Penn State	L 49–64	15–6 (5–5)	14 – Jackson-Davis	7 – Tied	4 – Phinisee	Bryce Jordan Center (7,656); University Park, PA
February 1, 2020; 12:00 pm, ESPN		at Ohio State	L 59–68	15–7 (5–6)	13 – Green	7 – Jackson-Davis	3 – Tied	Value City Arena (18,809); Columbus, OH
February 8, 2020; 2:00 pm, ESPN		Purdue; Rivalry/Indiana National Guard Governor's Cup	L 62–74	15–8 (5–7)	16 – Jackson-Davis	8 – Jackson-Davis	4 – Tied	Simon Skjodt Assembly Hall (17,222); Bloomington, IN
February 13, 2020; 8:00 pm, BTN		No. 21 Iowa	W 89–77	16–8 (6–7)	27 – Green	10 – Jackson-Davis	5 – Phinisee	Simon Skjodt Assembly Hall (17,222); Bloomington, IN
February 16, 2020; 1:00 pm, CBS		at Michigan	L 65–89	16–9 (6–8)	18 – Davis	5 – Hunter	2 – Tied	Crisler Center (12,707); Ann Arbor, MI
February 19, 2020; 9:00 pm, BTN		at Minnesota	W 68–56	17–9 (7–8)	27 – Jackson-Davis	16 – Jackson-Davis	6 – Phinisee	Williams Arena (9,686); Minneapolis, MN
February 23, 2020; 12:00 pm, FS1		No. 9 Penn State	W 68–60	18–9 (8–8)	14 – Durham	10 – Jackson-Davis	3 – Green	Simon Skjodt Assembly Hall (17,222); Bloomington, IN
February 27, 2020; 7:00 pm, FS1		at Purdue; Rivalry/Indiana National Guard Governor's Cup	L 49–57	18–10 (8–9)	11 – Green	8 – Thompson	2 – Jackson-Davis	Mackey Arena (14,804); West Lafayette, IN
March 1, 2020; 2:00 pm, BTN		at Illinois; Rivalry	L 66–67	18–11 (8–10)	13 – Durham	12 – Jackson-Davis	3 – Green	State Farm Center (15,544); Champaign, IL
March 4, 2020; 7:00 pm, BTN		Minnesota	W 72–67	19–11 (9–10)	18 – Jackson-Davis	9 – Jackson-Davis	5 – Phinisee	Simon Skjodt Assembly Hall (17,222); Bloomington, IN
March 7, 2020; 12:00 pm, ESPN		No. 24 Wisconsin	L 56–60	19–12 (9–11)	16 – Green	11 – Thompson	7 – Phinisee	Simon Skjodt Assembly Hall (17,222); Bloomington, IN
Big Ten tournament
March 11, 2020; 8:30 pm, BTN	(11)	vs. (14) Nebraska; First round	W 89–64	20–12	13 – Franklin	17 – Jackson-Davis	7 – Phinisee	Bankers Life Fieldhouse; Indianapolis, IN
March 12, 2020; 9:00 pm, BTN	(11)	at (6) Penn State; Second round	Cancelled due to the COVID-19 pandemic					Bankers Life Fieldhouse; Indianapolis, IN
*Non-conference game. ^{#}Rankings from AP poll. (#) Tournament seedings in parentheses. All times are in Eastern Time.

== Player statistics ==
Individual player statistics (final)
			Minutes		Scoring		Total FGs			3-point FGs			Free-throws			Rebounds							
Player	GP	GS	Tot	Avg	Pts	Avg	FG	FGA	Pct	3FG	3FGA	Pct	FT	FTA	Pct	Off	Def	Tot	Avg	A	Stl	Blk	TO
Anderson, Damezi	18	0	222	12.3	51	2.8	17	54	.315	8	35	.229	9	10	.900	11	28	39	2.2	17	4	3	13
Brunk, Joey	32	31	624	19.5	219	6.8	97	186	.522	0	0	.000	25	56	.446	53	112	165	5.2	20	6	11	33
Bybee, Cooper	7	0	5	0.7	3	0.4	1	1	1.000	1	1	1.000	0	0	.000	0	0	0	0.0	0	0	0	0
Chapman, Adrian	1	0	1	1.0	0	0.0	0	1	.000	0	0	.000	0	0	.000	0	0	0	0.0	0	0	0	0
Childress, Nathan	5	0	6	1.2	0	0.0	0	4	.000	0	0	.000	0	0	.000	2	1	3	0.6	0	0	0	0
Davis, De'Ron	31	1	266	8.6	85	2.7	35	70	.500	0	1	.000	15	33	.455	18	23	41	1.3	13	11	6	16
Durham, Al	32	32	846	26.4	312	9.8	93	211	.441	36	94	.383	90	111	.811	5	62	67	2.1	80	18	10	60
Franklin, Armaan	32	9	442	13.8	119	3.7	39	112	.348	17	64	.266	24	39	.615	2	50	52	1.6	41	8	3	30
Green, Devonte	29	7	644	22.2	313	10.8	103	282	.365	59	165	.358	48	68	.706	8	69	77	2.7	62	20	6	52
Henderson, Jacquez	1	0	1	1.0	0	0.0	0	0	.000	0	0	.000	0	0	.000	0	0	0	0.0	0	0	0	0
Hunter, Jerome	31	0	431	13.9	115	3.7	36	103	.350	19	63	.302	24	32	.750	15	47	62	2.0	9	11	7	26
Jackson-Davis, Trayce	32	32	940	29.4	433	13.5	159	281	.566	0	0	.000	115	168	.685	96	174	270	8.4	37	22	59	42
Phinisee, Robert	27	16	627	23.2	196	7.3	68	182	.374	23	69	.333	37	51	.725	6	61	67	2.5	93	27	6	52
Shipp, Michael	1	0	1	1.0	0	0.0	0	0	.000	0	0	.000	0	0	.000	0	0	0	0.0	0	0	0	0
Smith, Justin	32	32	971	30.3	334	10.4	127	258	.492	10	38	.263	70	104	.673	62	103	165	5.2	29	31	10	50
Thompson, Race	30	0	398	13.3	106	3.5	37	80	.463	3	10	.300	29	44	.659	37	77	114	3.8	13	20	19	12
Total	32	-	6425	200.8	2286	71.44	812	1825	.445	176	540	.326	486	716	.679	361	849	1210	37.8	414	178	140	402
Opponents	-	-	6425	200.8	2135	66.72	754	1809	.417	225	698	.322	402	589	.683	276	753	1029	32.2	387	199	107	392

Legend
GP	Games played	GS	Games started	Avg	Average per game
FG	Field goals made	FGA	Field goal attempts	Off	Offensive rebounds
Def	Defensive rebounds	A	Assists	TO	Turnovers
Blk	Blocks	Stl	Steals	High	Team high

== Rankings ==
Ranking movements Legend: ██ Increase in ranking ██ Decrease in ranking — = Not ranked RV = Received votes
	Week																			
Poll	Pre	1	2	3	4	5	6	7	8	9	10	11	12	13	14	15	16	17	18	Final
AP	—	—	—	—	RV	RV	RV	RV	RV	RV	—	RV	RV	RV	—	—	—	—	—	Not released
Coaches	—	—	—	RV	RV	RV	RV	RV	RV	—	—	RV	RV	RV	RV	—	—	—	—	—

*AP does not release post-NCAA tournament rankings

== See also ==
- 2019–20 Indiana Hoosiers women's basketball team
