= 2019–20 Iowa Hawkeyes men's basketball team =

American college basketball season

2019–20 Iowa Hawkeyes men's basketball
- Conference: Big Ten Conference

Ranking
- Coaches: No. 25
- AP: No. 25
- Record: 20–11 (11–9 Big Ten)
- Head coach: Fran McCaffery (10th season)
- Assistant coaches: Sherman Dillard; Kirk Speraw; Billy Taylor
- Home arena: Carver–Hawkeye Arena

2019–20 Big Ten Conference men's basketball standings
	Conf.				Overall
Team	W		L	PCT	W		L	PCT
No. 17 Wisconsin	14	–	6	.700	21	–	10	.677
No. 9 Michigan State	14	–	6	.700	22	–	9	.710
No. 12 Maryland	14	–	6	.700	24	–	7	.774
No. 21 Illinois	13	–	7	.650	21	–	10	.677
No. 25 Iowa	11	–	9	.550	20	–	11	.645
Penn State	11	–	9	.550	21	–	10	.677
No. 19 Ohio State	11	–	9	.550	21	–	10	.677
Rutgers	11	–	9	.550	20	–	11	.645
Michigan	10	–	10	.500	19	–	12	.613
Purdue	9	–	11	.450	16	–	15	.516
Indiana	9	–	11	.450	20	–	12	.625
Minnesota	8	–	12	.400	15	–	16	.484
Northwestern	3	–	17	.150	8	–	23	.258
Nebraska	2	–	18	.100	7	–	25	.219
The 2020 Big Ten tournament was canceled prior to the second round due to the COVID-19 pandemic. Rankings from AP poll

The 2019–20 Iowa Hawkeyes men's basketball team represented the University of Iowa during the 2019–20 NCAA Division I men's basketball season. The team was led by 10th-year head coach Fran McCaffery and played their home games at Carver–Hawkeye Arena as members of the Big Ten Conference. They finished the season 20–11, 11–9 in Big Ten play to finish in four-way tie for fifth place. Their season ended when postseason tournaments including the Big Ten tournament and the NCAA tournament were canceled due to the coronavirus pandemic.

Forward Luka Garza was named Big Ten Player of the Year and was a consensus All-American.

== Previous season ==
The Hawkeyes finished the 2018–19 season 23–12, 10–10 in Big Ten play to finish in sixth place. They defeated Illinois in the second round of the Big Ten tournament before losing to Michigan in the quarterfinals. They received an at-large bid to the NCAA tournament as the No. 10 seed in the South region. There they defeated No. 7-seeded Cincinnati in the first round before losing to No. 2-seeded Tennessee in the second round.

== Offseason ==
=== Departures ===
Name	Number	Pos.	Height	Weight	Year	Hometown	Reason for departure
Maishe Dailey	1	G	6'7"	200	Junior	Beachwood, OH	Transferred to Akron
Isaiah Moss	4	G	6'5"	208	RS Junior	Chicago, IL	Graduate transferred to Kansas
Tyler Cook	25	F	6'9"	253	Junior	St. Louis, MO	Play professionally
Nicholas Baer	51	F	6'7"	218	RS Senior	Bettendorf, IA	Graduated

=== Incoming transfers ===
Name	Number	Pos.	Height	Weight	Year	Hometown	Previous School
Bakari Evelyn	4	G	6'2"	180	Graduate Student	Detroit, MI	Transferred from Valparaiso. Will be eligible to play immediately since Evelyn graduated from Valpariso.

=== 2019 recruiting class ===
College recruiting information
Name	Hometown	School	Height	Weight	Commit date
Patrick McCaffery; PF	Iowa City, IA	West High School	6 ft 9 in (2.06 m)	180 lb (82 kg)	Oct 5, 2017
Patrick McCaffery; PF	Recruit ratings: Scout: Rivals: 247Sports: ESPN:				
Joe Toussaint; PG	Bronx, NY	Cardinals Hayes High School	6 ft 0 in (1.83 m)	165 lb (75 kg)	Nov 14, 2018
Joe Toussaint; PG	Recruit ratings: Scout: Rivals: 247Sports: ESPN:				
Overall recruit ranking:
Note: In many cases, Scout, Rivals, 247Sports, On3, and ESPN may conflict in their listings of height and weight.; In these cases, the average was taken. ESPN grades are on a 100-point scale.; Sources: "ESPN- Iowa Hawkeyes Men's Basketball Recruiting". ESPN.; "2019 Team Ranking". Rivals.

=== 2020 recruiting class ===
College recruiting information (2020)
Name	Hometown	School	Height	Weight	Commit date
Ahron Ulis; PG	Chicago Heights, IL	Marian Catholic School	6 ft 2 in (1.88 m)	175 lb (79 kg)	Aug 6, 2019
Ahron Ulis; PG	Recruit ratings: Scout: Rivals: 247Sports:				
Overall recruit ranking:
Note: In many cases, Scout, Rivals, 247Sports, On3, and ESPN may conflict in their listings of height and weight.; In these cases, the average was taken. ESPN grades are on a 100-point scale.; Sources: "ESPN- Iowa Hawkeyes Men's Basketball Recruiting". ESPN.; "2020 Team Ranking". Rivals.

== Roster ==
2019–20 Iowa Hawkeyes men's basketball team
Players
Coaches

Pos.	#	Name	Height	Weight	Year	Previous school	Hometown
F	0	Michael Baer (W)	6 ft 7 in (2.01 m)	205 lb (93 kg)	Jr	Bettendorf HS	Bettendorf, IA
G	1	Joe Toussaint	6 ft 0 in (1.83 m)	185 lb (84 kg)	Fr	Cardinal Hayes HS	Bronx, NY
F	2	Jack Nunge (injured)	6 ft 11 in (2.11 m)	245 lb (111 kg)	RS So	Castle HS	Newburgh, IN
G	3	Jordan Bohannon (injured)	6 ft 1 in (1.85 m)	185 lb (84 kg)	Sr	Linn-Mar HS	Marion, IA
G	4	Bakari Evelyn	6 ft 2 in (1.88 m)	180 lb (82 kg)	GS	Valparaiso	Detroit, MI
G	5	CJ Fredrick	6 ft 3 in (1.91 m)	195 lb (88 kg)	RS Fr	Covington Catholic HS	Cincinnati, OH
G	10	Joe Wieskamp	6 ft 6 in (1.98 m)	210 lb (95 kg)	So	Muscatine HS	Muscatine, IA
G	13	Austin Ash (W)	6 ft 2 in (1.88 m)	170 lb (77 kg)	RS So	Mount Vernon HS	Cedar Rapids, IA
F	15	Ryan Kriener	6 ft 9 in (2.06 m)	255 lb (116 kg)	Sr	Spirit Lake HS	Spirit Lake, IA
F	20	Riley Till (W)	6 ft 7 in (2.01 m)	205 lb (93 kg)	RS Jr	Wahlert Catholic HS	Dubuque, IA
F	22	Patrick McCaffery (redshirt)	6 ft 9 in (2.06 m)	190 lb (86 kg)	Fr	Iowa City West HS	Iowa City, IA
G	24	Nicolas Hobbs (W)	6 ft 2 in (1.88 m)	200 lb (91 kg)	Jr	Fenwick HS	Chicago, IL
G	30	Conner McCaffery	6 ft 5 in (1.96 m)	205 lb (93 kg)	RS So	Iowa City West HS	Iowa City, IA
F	35	Cordell Pemsl	6 ft 8 in (2.03 m)	230 lb (104 kg)	Sr	Wahlert Catholic HS	Dubuque, IA
G	51	Aidan Vanderloo (W) (redshirt)	6 ft 2 in (1.88 m)	190 lb (86 kg)	Fr	Sioux City East HS	Sioux City, IA
C	55	Luka Garza	6 ft 11 in (2.11 m)	260 lb (118 kg)	Jr	Maret School	Washington, D.C.

Head coach

- Fran McCaffery (Penn)

Assistant coach(es)

- Sherman Dillard (James Madison)
- Kirk Speraw (Iowa)
- Billy Taylor (Notre Dame)

Legend

- (C) Team captain
- (S) Suspended
- (I) Ineligible
- (W) Walk-on
- Injured
- Current redshirt

Roster

== Schedule and results ==
Date time, TV	Rank^{#}	Opponent^{#}	Result	Record	High points	High rebounds	High assists	Site (attendance) city, state
Exhibition
November 4, 2019*; 7:00 p.m., BTN Plus		Lindsey Wilson	W 96–58		19 – Wieskamp	7 – Toussiant	11 – C. McCaffery	Carver–Hawkeye Arena (9,830); Iowa City, IA
Regular season
November 8, 2019*; 8:00 p.m., BTN		SIU Edwardsville	W 87–60	1–0	20 – Garza	12 – Garza	4 – Tied	Carver–Hawkeye Arena (10,300); Iowa City, IA
November 11, 2019*; 7:00 p.m., FS1		DePaul; Gavitt Tipoff Games	L 78–93	1–1	16 – Fredrick	8 – Tied	3 – Tied	Carver–Hawkeye Arena (9,961); Iowa City, IA
November 15, 2019*; 7:00 p.m., BTN Plus		Oral Roberts	W 87–74	2–1	30 – Garza	10 – Tied	7 – McCaffery	Carver–Hawkeye Arena (11,021); Iowa City, IA
November 21, 2019*; 6:00 p.m., BTN		North Florida; Las Vegas Invitational campus site game	W 83–68	3–1	29 – Garza	12 – Garza	7 – McCaffery	Carver–Hawkeye Arena (9,389); Iowa City, IA
November 24, 2019*; 4:00 p.m., BTN		Cal Poly; Las Vegas Invitational campus site game	W 85–59	4–1	21 – Fredrick	9 – Garza	5 – Fredrick	Carver–Hawkeye Arena (10,730); Iowa City, IA
November 28, 2019*; 7:00 pm, FS1		vs. No. 12 Texas Tech; Las Vegas Invitational semifinals	W 72–61	5–1	20 – Bohannon	12 – Garza	6 – Bohannon	Orleans Arena; Paradise, NV
November 29, 2019*; 7:00 pm, FS1		vs. San Diego State; Las Vegas Invitational championship game	L 73–83	5–2	16 – Fredrick	8 – Garza	5 – Fredrick	Orleans Arena (4,855); Paradise, NV
December 3, 2019*; 6:00 p.m., ESPN2		at Syracuse; ACC–Big Ten Challenge	W 68–54	6–2	23 – Garza	9 – Tied	4 – Tied	Carrier Dome (20,844); Syracuse, NY
December 6, 2019; 5:30 p.m., FS1		at No. 4 Michigan	L 91–103	6–3 (0–1)	44 – Garza	8 – Garza	5 – Fredrick	Crisler Center (12,707); Ann Arbor, MI
December 9, 2019; 7:00 p.m., BTN		Minnesota	W 72–52	7–3 (1–1)	23 – Wieskamp	10 – Garza	10 – Bohannon	Carver–Hawkeye Arena (10,442); Iowa City, IA
December 12, 2019*; 7:00 pm, ESPN2		at Iowa State; Iowa Corn Cy-Hawk Series	W 84–68	8–3	21 – Garza	11 – Garza	3 – Tied	Hilton Coliseum (14,384); Ames, IA
December 21, 2019*; 8:00 pm, BTN		vs. Cincinnati; Chicago Legends	W 77–70	9–3	21 – Fredrick	13 – Garza	4 – Tied	United Center (6,814); Chicago, IL
December 29, 2019*; 3:00 p.m., ESPNU	No. 25	Kennesaw State	W 93–51	10–3	23 – Garza	8 – Garza	7 – Toussiant	Carver–Hawkeye Arena (15,056); Iowa City, IA
January 4, 2020; 1:00 p.m., BTN	No. 23	vs. No. 21 Penn State	L 86–89	10–4 (1–2)	34 – Garza	12 – Garza	4 – Tied	Palestra (7,881); Philadelphia, PA
January 7, 2020; 8:00 p.m., BTN		at Nebraska	L 70–76	10–5 (1–3)	21 – Wieskamp	18 – Garza	4 – 2 tied	Pinnacle Bank Arena (14,722); Lincoln, NE
January 10, 2020; 6:00 p.m., FS1		No. 12 Maryland	W 67–49	11–5 (2–3)	26 – Wieskamp	13 – Garza	5 – Toussaint	Carver–Hawkeye Arena (11,721); Iowa City, IA
January 14, 2020; 7:00 p.m., BTN		at Northwestern	W 75–62	12–5 (3–3)	27 – Garza	7 – McCaffery	7 – Evelyn	Welsh–Ryan Arena (6,023); Evanston, IL
January 17, 2020; 8:00 p.m., FS1		No. 19 Michigan	W 90–83	13–5 (4–3)	33 – Garza	13 – McCaffery	5 – Tied	Carver–Hawkeye Arena (14,136); Iowa City, IA
January 22, 2020; 8:00 p.m., BTN	No. 19	No. 24 Rutgers	W 85–80	14–5 (5–3)	28 – Garza	13 – Garza	4 – Wieskamp	Carver–Hawkeye Arena (10,006); Iowa City, IA
January 27, 2020; 7:30 p.m., BTN	No. 18	Wisconsin	W 68–62	15–5 (6–3)	21 – Garza	18 – Garza	4 – Toussaint	Carver–Hawkeye Arena (12,566); Iowa City, IA
January 30, 2020; 7:30 p.m., BTN	No. 18	at No. 15 Maryland	L 72–82	15–6 (6–4)	21 – Garza	8 – Pemsl	5 – McCaffery	Xfinity Center (16,369); College Park, MD
February 2, 2020; 12:00 p.m., FS1	No. 18	No. 19 Illinois; Rivalry	W 72–65	16–6 (7–4)	25 – Garza	10 – Garza	7 – McCaffery	Carver–Hawkeye Arena (15,056); Iowa City, IA
February 5, 2020; 6:00 p.m., BTN	No. 17	at Purdue	L 68–104	16–7 (7–5)	26 – Garza	4 – Tied	5 – Evelyn	Mackey Arena (14,804); West Lafayette, IN
February 8, 2020; 5:00 p.m., BTN	No. 17	Nebraska	W 96–72	17–7 (8–5)	30 – Wieskamp	8 – Garza	4 – McCaffery	Carver–Hawkeye Arena (15,056); Iowa City, IA
February 13, 2020; 7:00 p.m., BTN	No. 21	at Indiana	L 77–89	17–8 (8–6)	38 – Garza	8 – Garza	5 – Toussaint	Simon Skjodt Assembly Hall (17,222); Bloomington, IN
February 16, 2020; 12:00 p.m., FS1	No. 21	at Minnesota	W 58–55	18–8 (9–6)	24 – Garza	8 – Tied	7 – McCaffery	Williams Arena (14,625); Minneapolis, MN
February 20, 2020; 6:00 p.m., ESPN	No. 20	No. 25 Ohio State	W 85–76	19–8 (10–6)	24 – Garza	8 – Pemsl	4 – Tied	Carver–Hawkeye Arena (14,001); Iowa City, IA
February 25, 2020; 6:00 p.m., ESPN2	No. 18	at No. 24 Michigan State	L 70–78	19–9 (10–7)	20 – Garza	9 – Garza	7 – McCaffery	Breslin Center (14,797); East Lansing, MI
February 29, 2020; 11:00 a.m., BTN	No. 18	No. 16 Penn State	W 77–68	20–9 (11–7)	25 – Garza	17 – Garza	8 – Toussaint	Carver–Hawkeye Arena (15,056); Iowa City, IA
March 3, 2020; 8:00 p.m., BTN	No. 18	Purdue	L 68–77	20–10 (11–8)	26 – Garza	12 – Garza	5 – Fredrick	Carver–Hawkeye Arena (13,216); Iowa City, IA
March 8, 2020; 6:00 p.m., BTN	No. 18	at No. 23 Illinois; Rivalry	L 76–78	20–11 (11–9)	28 – Garza	8 – Garza	8 – McCaffery	State Farm Center (15,544); Champaign, IL
Big Ten tournament
Canceled
NCAA tournament
Canceled
*Non-conference game. ^{#}Rankings from AP Poll. (#) Tournament seedings in parentheses. All times are in Central Time.

- Source: Schedule

== Rankings ==
Ranking movements Legend: ██ Increase in ranking ██ Decrease in ranking — = Not ranked RV = Received votes
	Week																			
Poll	Pre	1	2	3	4	5	6	7	8	9	10	11	12	13	14	15	16	17	18	Final
AP	—	—	—	—	—	—	RV	25	23	RV	RV	19	18	17	21	20	18	18	25	25
Coaches	—	—	—	—	—	—	RV	RV	25	RV	24	19	18	17	17	20	17	18	25	25

*Coaches did not release a Week 1 poll.
