= Joe Wieskamp =

American basketball player (born 1999)

- Wieskamp with ALBA Berlin in 2026

No. 11 – Alba Berlin
- Position: Shooting guard / small forward
- League: BBL

Personal information
- Born: August 23, 1999 (age 27) Muscatine, Iowa, U.S.
- Listed height: 6 ft 6 in (1.98 m)
- Listed weight: 205 lb (93 kg)

Career information
- High school: Muscatine (Muscatine, Iowa)
- College: Iowa (2018–2021)
- NBA draft: 2021: 2nd round, 41st overall pick
- Drafted by: San Antonio Spurs
- Playing career: 2021–present

Career history
- 2021–2022: San Antonio Spurs
- 2021–2022: →Austin Spurs
- 2022–2023: Wisconsin Herd
- 2023: Toronto Raptors
- 2023: →Raptors 905
- 2023–2024: Texas Legends
- 2024: Maine Celtics
- 2024–2025: South East Melbourne Phoenix
- 2025–2026: Science City Jena
- 2026–present: Alba Berlin

Career highlights
- Second-team All-Big Ten (2021); Third-team All-Big Ten (2020); Big Ten All-Freshman Team (2019); Iowa Mr. Basketball (2018)
- Stats at NBA.com
- Stats at Basketball Reference

Joseph Hinman Wieskamp (born August 23, 1999) is an American professional basketball player for Alba Berlin of the Basketball Bundesliga (BBL). He played college basketball for the Iowa Hawkeyes before being drafted 41st overall in the 2021 NBA draft by the San Antonio Spurs.

== Early life ==
In middle school, Wieskamp played football as a quarterback and was a talented baseball player. He quit football after breaking his thumb and eventually decided to focus solely on basketball. Wieskamp played basketball for Muscatine High School in his hometown of Muscatine, Iowa. In his freshman season, he averaged 18.6 points per game, which made him the top scoring freshman in Iowa. Wieskamp became the first freshman in Mississippi Athletic Conference (MAC) history to earn all-conference honors. In his sophomore season, he averaged 21.6 points and 10 rebounds per game and was named first-team all-state.

As a junior, Wieskamp averaged 30.4 points and 10.2 rebounds per game and was recognized as MAC Player of the Year. He became the first Iowa Class 4A player to average 30 points since Jeff Horner in 2002. Wieskamp scored a school-record 50 points in a win over Burlington High School to become Muscatine's all-time leading scorer. He was voted Iowa Gatorade Player of the Year. As a senior, Wieskamp averaged a state-high 33.5 points and 13.5 rebounds per game, leading his team to its first state tournament in 16 years. He repeated as Iowa Gatorade Player of the Year and was named Iowa Mr. Basketball. Wieskamp left high school as the Iowa Class 4A career scoring leader, with 2,376 points.

Wieskamp committed to play college basketball for Iowa on June 9, 2015, before his sophomore year. At the end of his high school career, he was considered a consensus four-star recruit and the best prospect in Iowa.

College recruiting
Name	Hometown	School	Height	Weight	Commit date
Joe Wieskamp; SG	Muscatine, IA	Muscatine (IA)	6 ft 6 in (1.98 m)	190 lb (86 kg)	Jun 9, 2015
Joe Wieskamp; SG	Recruit ratings: Rivals: 247Sports: ESPN: (84)				
Overall recruit ranking: Rivals: 43 247Sports: 55 ESPN: 77
Note: In many cases, Scout, Rivals, 247Sports, On3, and ESPN may conflict in their listings of height and weight.; In these cases, the average was taken. ESPN grades are on a 100-point scale.; Sources: "Iowa 2018 Basketball Commitments". Rivals.; "2018 Iowa Hawkeyes Recruiting Class". ESPN.; "2018 Team Ranking". Rivals.

== College career ==
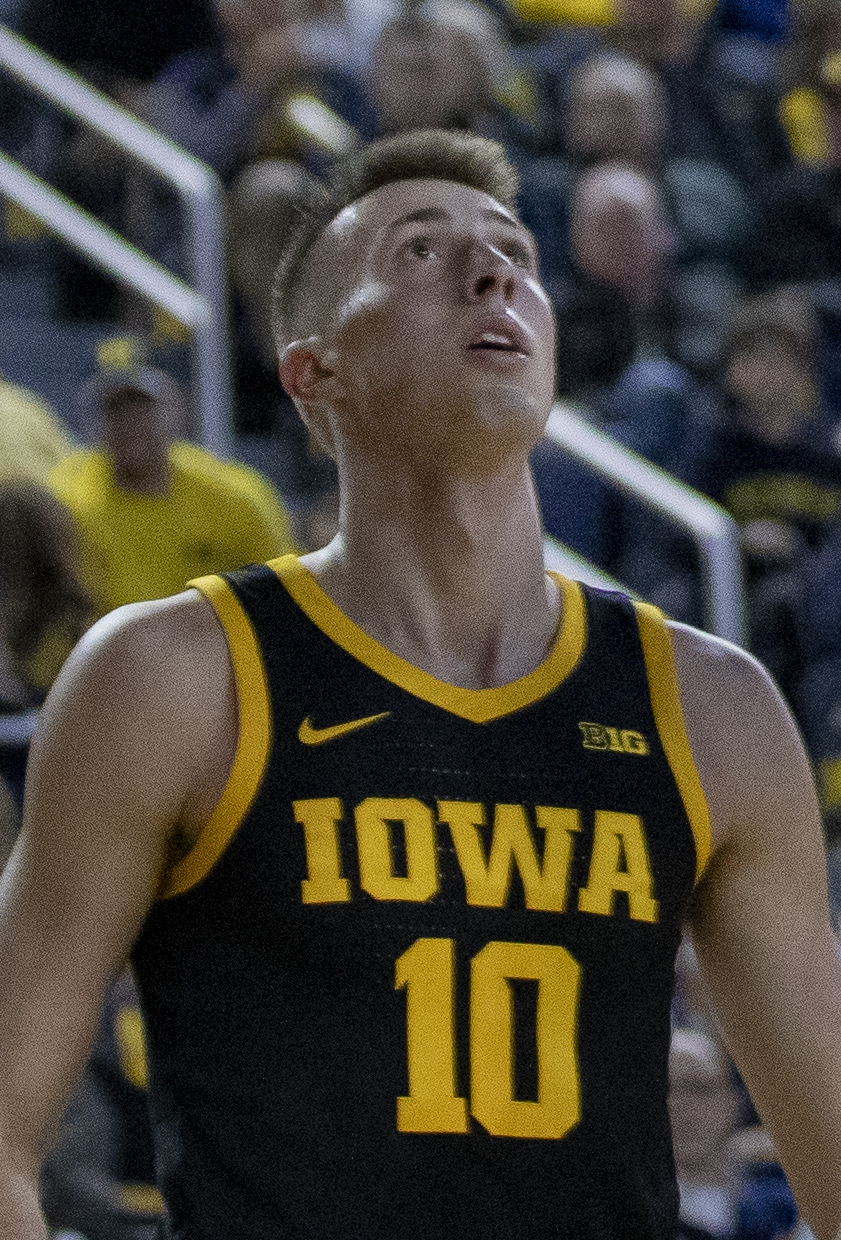
Wieskamp with Iowa in 2019

On January 20, 2019, Wieskamp went 8-for-8 from the floor and scored a season-high 24 points in a 95–71 win over Illinois. Wieskamp had 19 points and five rebounds against Cincinnati in the NCAA tournament. As a freshman he averaged 11.1 points and 4.9 rebounds per game, shooting 42.4 percent from beyond the arc. He started all 35 games and was named to the Big Ten All-freshman team. After the season he declared for the 2019 NBA draft but did not hire an agent. Wieskamp ultimately decided to withdraw from the draft and return to Iowa.

Coming into his sophomore season, Wieskamp was named to the preseason All-Big Ten team and the watchlist for the Jerry West Award. In his sophomore season opener, Wieskamp hyperextended his elbow and had a shooting slump to start the season. On December 9, he had 23 points in a 72–52 win over Minnesota. Wieskamp scored a then career-high 26 points on January 10, 2020, in a 67–49 win over Maryland. He set a new career-high with 30 points on February 8, in a 96–72 win over Nebraska. At the close of the regular season, Wieskamp was named third-team All-Big Ten by the coaches and media. He averaged 14.0 points and 6.1 rebounds per game and led the Big Ten in free throw shooting at 85.6 percent.

On February 10, 2021, Wieskamp recorded a junior season-high 26 points and 10 rebounds in a 79–66 win against Rutgers. As a junior, he averaged 14.8 points and 6.6 rebounds per game, shooting 46 percent from three-point range, and was named second-team All-Big Ten. On April 14, Wieskamp declared for the 2021 NBA draft while maintaining his college eligibility. He later decided to remain in the draft.

== Professional career ==
=== San Antonio Spurs (2021–2022) ===
On July 29, 2021, Wieskamp was drafted with the 41st overall pick in the 2021 NBA draft by the San Antonio Spurs. He joined the Spurs for the 2021 NBA Summer League. On September 7, he signed a two-way contract with the Spurs, splitting his time between San Antonio and their NBA G League affiliate, the Austin Spurs. On November 10, he made his NBA debut, scoring 3 points off the bench in a 136–117 win over the Sacramento Kings. On March 4, 2022, his contract was converted to a standard contract.

On August 24, 2022, Wieskamp re-signed with the Spurs, but was later waived on October 17, 2022.

=== Wisconsin Herd (2022) ===
On October 22, 2022, Wieskamp was selected second overall in 2022 NBA G League draft. On November 3, Wieskamp was named to the opening night roster for the Wisconsin Herd.

=== Toronto Raptors (2023) ===
On January 7, 2023, Wieskamp signed a 10-day contract with the Toronto Raptors. He was signed to a second 10-day contract on January 17. On January 19, he saw his first action for the Raptors and went 3-of-3 from 3-pointers in a 128–126 loss to the Minnesota Timberwolves. On January 27, Wieskamp was reacquired by the Herd. On February 11, he signed a multi-year contract with the Raptors. He appeared in nine games for the Raptors in the 2022–23 season.

On July 17, 2023, Wieskamp was waived by the Raptors following the NBA Summer League.

=== Texas Legends (2023–2024) ===
On August 14, 2023, Wieskamp signed with the Dallas Mavericks, but was waived on October 14. On October 29, he joined the Texas Legends.

=== Maine Celtics (2024) ===
On February 12, 2024, Wieskamp was acquired by the Maine Celtics in a three-team trade also including the Ontario Clippers.

Wieskamp joined the Minnesota Timberwolves for the 2024 NBA Summer League.

=== South East Melbourne Phoenix (2024–2025) ===
On July 8, 2024, Wieskamp signed with the South East Melbourne Phoenix of the Australian National Basketball League (NBL) for the 2024–25 season.

=== Science City Jena (2025–2026) ===
On July 29, 2025, he signed with Science City Jena of Basketball Bundesliga (BBL).

=== Alba Berlin (2026–present) ===
On July 20, 2026, he signed with Alba Berlin of the Basketball Bundesliga (BBL). He signed a three-year contract.

== Career statistics ==
Legend
GP	Games played	GS	Games started	MPG	Minutes per game
FG%	Field goal percentage	3P%	3-point field goal percentage	FT%	Free throw percentage
RPG	Rebounds per game	APG	Assists per game	SPG	Steals per game
BPG	Blocks per game	PPG	Points per game	**Bold**	Career high

=== NBA ===
Year	Team	GP	GS	MPG	FG%	3P%	FT%	RPG	APG	SPG	BPG	PPG
2021–22	San Antonio	**29**	0	**7.1**	**.357**	**.326**	.538	**.5**	**.3**	**.1**	**.1**	**2.1**
2022–23	Toronto	9	0	5.6	.214	.250	—	.4	**.3**	.0	.0	1.0
Career		38	0	6.7	.329	.309	.538	.5	.3	.1	.1	1.8

=== College ===
Year	Team	GP	GS	MPG	FG%	3P%	FT%	RPG	APG	SPG	BPG	PPG
2018–19	Iowa	**35**	**35**	27.7	.488	.424	.767	4.9	1.1	.9	**.5**	11.1
2019–20	Iowa	31	31	**32.5**	.427	.347	**.856**	6.1	1.6	**1.0**	**.5**	14.0
2020–21	Iowa	31	31	29.3	**.491**	**.462**	.677	**6.6**	**1.7**	.9	.3	**14.8**
Career		97	97	29.7	.467	.412	.771	5.8	1.5	.9	.4	13.2

== Personal life ==
Wieskamp's uncle is Jason Lunn. Lunn was the 2003 USA track and field national champion in the 1500m.
