= 2019–20 Big Ten Conference men's basketball season =

- League: NCAA Division I
- Sport: Basketball
- Teams: 14
- TV partner(s): Big Ten Network, ESPN, Fox, FS1, CBS

2019–20 NCAA Division I men's basketball season
- Regular season champions (shared): Maryland, Michigan State, and Wisconsin
- Season MVP: Luka Garza, Iowa
- Top scorer: Luka Garza

Tournament
- Venue: Bankers Life Fieldhouse, Indianapolis, Indiana

Basketball seasons
- 2018–19 2020–21

2019–20 Big Ten Conference men's basketball standings
	Conf.				Overall
Team	W		L	PCT	W		L	PCT
No. 17 Wisconsin	14	–	6	.700	21	–	10	.677
No. 9 Michigan State	14	–	6	.700	22	–	9	.710
No. 12 Maryland	14	–	6	.700	24	–	7	.774
No. 21 Illinois	13	–	7	.650	21	–	10	.677
No. 25 Iowa	11	–	9	.550	20	–	11	.645
Penn State	11	–	9	.550	21	–	10	.677
No. 19 Ohio State	11	–	9	.550	21	–	10	.677
Rutgers	11	–	9	.550	20	–	11	.645
Michigan	10	–	10	.500	19	–	12	.613
Purdue	9	–	11	.450	16	–	15	.516
Indiana	9	–	11	.450	20	–	12	.625
Minnesota	8	–	12	.400	15	–	16	.484
Northwestern	3	–	17	.150	8	–	23	.258
Nebraska	2	–	18	.100	7	–	25	.219
The 2020 Big Ten tournament was canceled prior to the second round due to the COVID-19 pandemic. Rankings from AP poll

The 2019–20 Big Ten men's basketball season began with practices in October 2019, followed by the start of the 2019–20 NCAA Division I men's basketball season on November 5, 2019. The regular season ended on March 8, 2020.

With a win against Indiana on March 7, 2020, Wisconsin earned a share of the Big Ten regular season championship. With a win over Michigan on March 8, Maryland earned a share of their first Big Ten regular season championship. Also with a win on March 8 against Ohio State, Michigan State earned a share of their third straight Big Ten regular season championship. Due to tie-breaking rules, Wisconsin received the No. 1 seed, Michigan State the No. 2 seed, and Maryland the No. 3 seed in the Big Ten tournament.

The Big Ten tournament was scheduled to be played at Bankers Life Fieldhouse in Indianapolis, Indiana from March 11 through 15, until the tournament was canceled due to the COVID-19 pandemic. The NCAA Tournament was likewise canceled on March 12.

Iowa big man Luka Garza was named Big Ten Player of the Year. Wisconsin coach Greg Gard was named Coach of the Year.

== Head coaches ==
=== Coaching changes prior to the season ===
==== Nebraska ====
On March 26, 2019, Nebraska fired head coach Tim Miles. Four days later, the school hired former Chicago Bulls' head coach Fred Hoiberg as the next head coach.

==== Michigan ====
On May 13, 2019, Michigan head coach John Beilein left the school to accept the head coaching position with the Cleveland Cavaliers. Nine days later, the school hired former Michigan player and member of the "Fab Five" Juwan Howard as head coach.

=== Coaches ===
Team	Head coach	Previous job	Years at school	Overall record	Big Ten record	Big Ten titles	Big Ten tournament titles	NCAA Tournaments	NCAA Final Fours	NCAA Championships
Illinois	Brad Underwood	Oklahoma State	3	26–39	11–27	0	0	0	0	0
Indiana	Archie Miller	Dayton	3	35–31	17–21	0	0	0	0	0
Iowa	Fran McCaffery	Siena	10	174–132	78–86	0	0	4	0	0
Maryland	Mark Turgeon	Texas A&M	9	180–92	62–37*	0	0	4	0	0
Michigan	Juwan Howard	Miami Heat (Asst.)	1	0–0	0–0	0	0	0	0	0
Michigan State	Tom Izzo	Michigan State (Asst.)	25	606–232	285–126	9	6	22	8	1
Minnesota	Richard Pitino	FIU	7	112–92	40–70	0	0	2	0	0
Nebraska	Fred Hoiberg	Chicago Bulls	1	0–0	0–0	0	0	0	0	0
Northwestern	Chris Collins	Duke (Asst.)	7	101–96	40–68	0	0	1	0	0
Ohio State	Chris Holtmann	Butler	3	45–19	23–15	0	0	2	0	0
Penn State	Pat Chambers	Boston University	8	127–140	45–100	0	0	0	0	0
Purdue	Matt Painter	Purdue (Assoc.)	15	321–159	158–92	3	1	11	0	0
Rutgers	Steve Pikiell	Stony Brook	4	44–54	13–43	0	0	0	0	0
Wisconsin	Greg Gard	Wisconsin (Assoc.)	5	80–47	45–29	1	0	3	0	0

Notes:

- All records, appearances, titles, etc. are from time with current school only.
- Year at school includes 2019–20 season.
- Overall and Big Ten records are from time at current school and are through the beginning of the season.
- Turgeon's ACC conference record excluded since Maryland began Big Ten Conference play in 2014–15.

== Preseason ==
=== Preseason conference poll ===
Prior to the conference's annual media day, unofficial awards and a poll were chosen by a panel of 28 writers, two for each team in the conference. Michigan State was the near unanimous selection to win the conference, receiving 27 of 28 first-place votes.

Rank	Team
1	Michigan State (27)
2	Maryland (1)
3	Ohio State
4	Purdue
5	Michigan
6	Wisconsin
7	Illinois
8	Iowa
9	Penn State
10	Indiana
11	Minnesota
12	Rutgers
13	Nebraska
14	Northwestern
(first place votes)

=== Preseason All-Big Ten ===
On October 2, 2019, a panel of conference media selected a 10-member preseason All-Big Ten Team and Player of the Year.

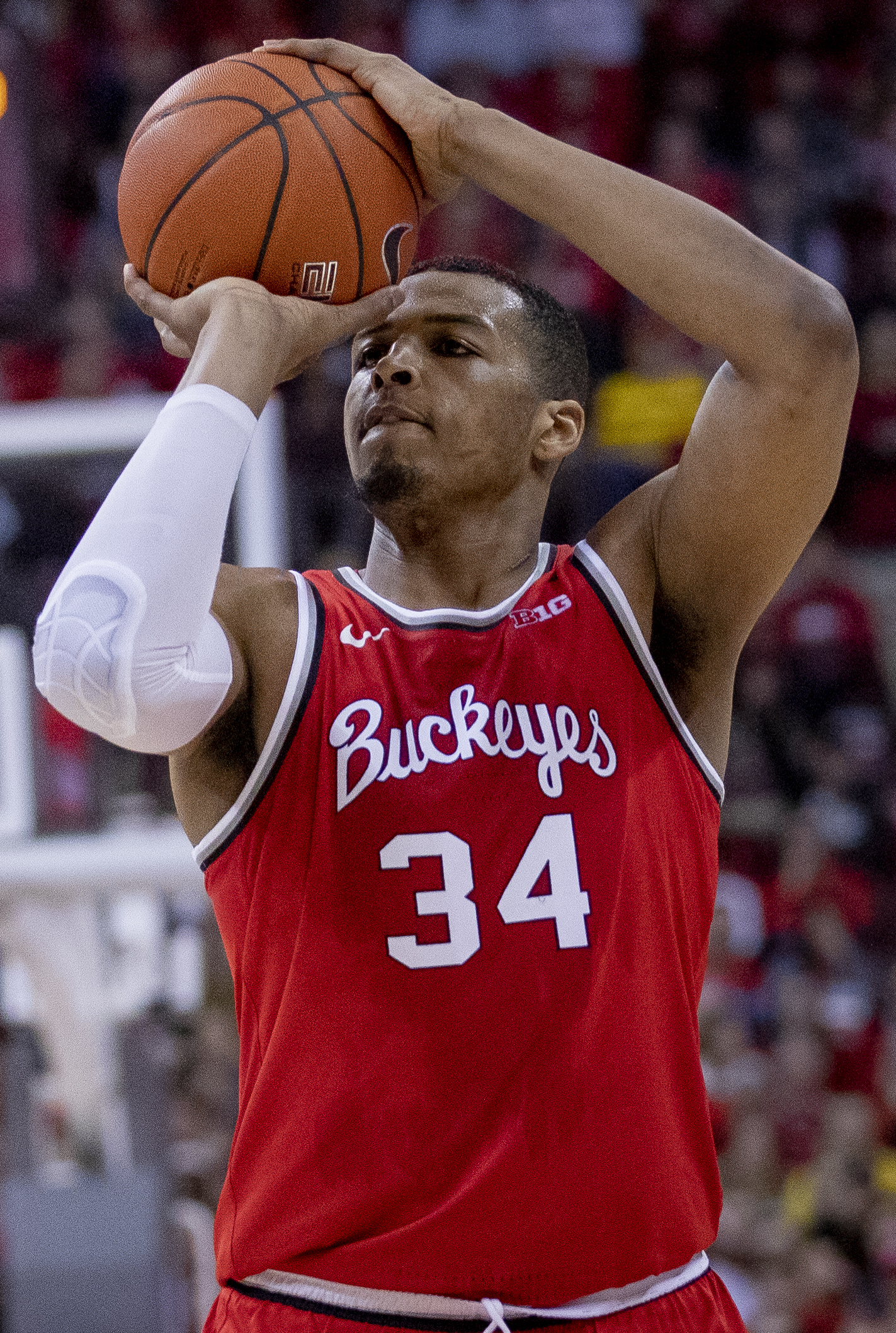
Kaleb Wesson

Honor	Recipient
Preseason Player of the Year	Cassius Winston*, Michigan State
Preseason All-Big Ten Team	Anthony Cowan*, Maryland
Preseason All-Big Ten Team	Ayo Dosunmu, Illinois
Preseason All-Big Ten Team	Nojel Eastern, Purdue
Preseason All-Big Ten Team	Zavier Simpson, Michigan
Preseason All-Big Ten Team	Jalen Smith, Maryland
Preseason All-Big Ten Team	Lamar Stevens, Penn State
Preseason All-Big Ten Team	Xavier Tillman, Michigan State
Preseason All-Big Ten Team	Kaleb Wesson*, Ohio State
Preseason All-Big Ten Team	Joe Wieskamp, Iowa
Preseason All-Big Ten Team	Cassius Winston*, Michigan State
*Unanimous selections

=== Preseason watchlists ===
Below is a table of notable preseason watch lists.

	Wooden	Naismith	Robertson	Cousy	West	Erving	Malone	Abdul-Jabbar
Anthony Cowan, Maryland	✓	✓		✓				
Ayo Dosunmu, Illinois	✓	✓		✓				
Trent Frazier, Illinois					✓			
Luka Garza, Iowa								✓
Matt Haarms, Purdue								✓
Joshua Langford, Michigan State					✓			
Zavier Simpson, Michigan		✓		✓				
Jalen Smith, Maryland	✓	✓					✓	
Lamar Stevens, Penn State	✓	✓					✓	
Jon Teske, Michigan								✓
Xavier Tillman, Michigan State		✓					✓	
Kaleb Wesson, Ohio State	✓	✓					✓	
Trevion Williams, Purdue							✓	
Cassius Winston, Michigan State	✓	✓		✓				

=== Preseason national polls ===
	AP	Athlon; Sports	Bleacher; Report	Blue Ribbon; Yearbook	CBS Sports	Coaches	ESPN	Lindy's; Sports	NBC Sports	SBNation	Sports; Illustrated	Street and Smith	USBWA
Illinois		23											
Indiana													
Iowa													
Maryland	7	7		7	5	8	10	9	7			6	
Michigan													
Michigan State	1	1		1	1	1	1	1	1			1	
Minnesota													
Nebraska													
Northwestern													
Ohio State	18	14		24	14	16	13	17	25				
Penn State													
Purdue	23	22		22	18	22						19	
Rutgers													
Wisconsin													

== Regular season ==
=== 2019 ACC–Big Ten Challenge (Big Ten 8–6) ===
Date	Time	ACC team	B1G team	Score	Location	Television	Attendance	Challenge leader
Dec 2	7:00 pm	**Miami**	Illinois	81–79	State Farm Center • Champaign, Illinois	ESPN2	11,819	ACC (1–0)
Dec 2	9:00 pm	Clemson	**Minnesota**	78–60	Williams Arena • Minneapolis, Minnesota	ESPN2	10,148	Tied (1–1)
Dec 3	7:00 pm	Boston College	**Northwestern**	82–64	Conte Forum • Chestnut Hill, Massachusetts	ESPNU	4,004	B1G (2–1)
Dec 3	7:00 pm	Syracuse	**Iowa**	68–54	Carrier Dome • Syracuse, New York	ESPN2	20,844	B1G (3–1)
Dec 3	7:30 pm	No. 1 **Louisville**	No. 4 Michigan	58–43	KFC Yum! Center • Louisville, Kentucky	ESPN	21,674	B1G (3–2)
Dec 3	9:00 pm	No. 17 Florida State	**Indiana**	80–64	Simon Skjodt Assembly Hall • Bloomington, Indiana	ESPN2	17,222	B1G (4–2)
Dec 3	9:00 pm	**Pittsburgh**	Rutgers	71–60	Petersen Events Center • Pittsburgh, Pennsylvania	ESPNU	7,894	B1G (4–3)
Dec 3	9:30 pm	No. 10 **Duke**	No. 11 Michigan State	87–75	Breslin Center • East Lansing, Michigan	ESPN	14,797	Tied (4–4)
Dec 4	7:15 pm	No. 5 Virginia	**Purdue**	69–40	Mackey Arena • West Lafayette, Indiana	ESPN2	14,804	B1G (5–4)
Dec 4	7:15 pm	**Georgia Tech**	Nebraska	73–56	McCamish Pavilion • Atlanta, Georgia	ESPNU	5,133	Tied (5–5)
Dec 4	7:30 pm	Notre Dame	No. 3 **Maryland**	72–51	Xfinity Center • College Park, Maryland	ESPN	15,529	B1G (6–5)
Dec 4	9:15 pm	**NC State**	Wisconsin	69–54	PNC Arena • Raleigh, North Carolina	ESPN2	16,035	Tied (6–6)
Dec 4	9:15 pm	Wake Forest	**Penn State**	76–54	Bryce Jordan Center • University Park, Pennsylvania	ESPNU	6,476	B1G (7–6)
Dec 4	9:30 pm	No. 7 North Carolina	No. 6 **Ohio State**	74–49	Dean Smith Center • Chapel Hill, North Carolina	ESPN	21,115	B1G (8–6)
**Winners are in bold** Game times in EST; Virginia Tech did not play due to the ACC having one more team than the B1G.

=== 2019 Gavitt Tipoff Games (Big Ten 5–3) ===
Date	Time	Big East team	Big Ten team	Score	Location	Television	Attendance	Leader
Mon., Nov. 11	8:00 PM	**DePaul**	Iowa	93–78	Carver–Hawkeye Arena • Iowa City, IA	FS1	9,961	Big East (1–0)
Tue., Nov. 12	6:30 PM	Creighton	**Michigan**	79–69	Crisler Center • Ann Arbor, MI	FS1	11,398	Tied (1–1)
Tue., Nov. 12	8:30 PM	**Butler**	Minnesota	64–56	Hinkle Fieldhouse • Indianapolis, IN	FS1	7,879	Big East (2–1)
Wed., Nov. 13	7:00 PM	No. 10 Villanova	No. 16 **Ohio State**	76–51	Value City Arena • Columbus, OH	FS1	16,419	Tied (2–2)
Wed., Nov. 13	9:00 PM	**Marquette**	Purdue	65–55	Fiserv Forum • Milwaukee, WI	FS1	15,659	Big East (3–2)
Wed., Nov. 13	9:00 PM	Providence	**Northwestern**	72–63	Welsh–Ryan Arena • Evanston, IL	BTN	5,204	Tied (3–3)
Thu., Nov. 14	6:30 PM	Georgetown	**Penn State**	81–66	Capital One Arena • Washington, D.C.	FS1	8,691	Big Ten (4–3)
Thu., Nov. 14	8:30 PM	No. 12 Seton Hall	No. 3 **Michigan State**	76–73	Prudential Center • Newark, NJ	FS1	14,051	Big Ten (5–3)
**WINNERS ARE IN BOLD**. Game Times in EST. Rankings from AP Poll (Nov 12). Did not participate: St. John's; Xavier (Big East); Illinois, Indiana, Maryland, Nebraska, Rutgers, Wisconsin (Big Ten)

=== Rankings ===
Legend
	Improvement in ranking
	Drop in ranking
	Not ranked previous week
RV	Received votes but were not ranked in Top 25 of poll
(Italics)	Number of first place votes

		Pre/ Wk 1	Wk 2	Wk 3	Wk 4	Wk 5	Wk 6	Wk 7	Wk 8	Wk 9	Wk 10	Wk 11	Wk 12	Wk 13	Wk 14	Wk 15	Wk 16	Wk 17	Wk 18	Wk 19	Final
Illinois	AP	RV										24	21	19	20	22	RV	RV	23	21	21
Illinois	C	RV						RV				RV	22	19	21	23	RV	RV	22	22	22
Indiana	AP					RV	RV	RV	RV	RV	RV	RV	RV	RV							
Indiana	C				RV	RV	RV	RV	RV	RV		RV	RV	RV	RV						
Iowa	AP							RV	25	23	RV	RV	19	18	17	21	20	18	18	25	25
Iowa	C							RV	RV	25	RV	24	19	18	17	17	20	17	18	25	25
Maryland	AP	7	7	6	5	3	4	7	13	15	12	17	17	15	9	9	7	9	9	12	12
Maryland	C	8		7 (1)	8 (1)	4 (2)	4 (1)	8	12	15	14	17	17	15	9	9	7	8	9	11	11
Michigan	AP	RV		RV	RV	4 (9)	5	14	11	12	19	19	RV		RV	RV	RV	19	25	RV	RV
Michigan	C	RV		RV	RV	5 (1)	7	15	15	13	19	20	RV			RV	RV	22	RV	RV	RV
Michigan State	AP	1 (60)	3	3 (4)	3 (4)	11	16	15	14	14	8	15	11	14	16	RV	RV	24	16	9	9
Michigan State	C	1 (30)		3 (4)	3 (1)	12	15	18	16	16	8	14	9	14	14	25	25	24	17	12	12
Minnesota	AP																				
Minnesota	C																				
Nebraska	AP																				
Nebraska	C																				
Northwestern	AP																				
Northwestern	C																				
Ohio State	AP	18	16	10	10	6	3 (5)	5	2 (9)	5	11	21	RV	RV	RV	RV	25	23	19	19	19
Ohio State	C	16		9	9 (1)	6 (1)	2 (2)	4 (1)	2 (7)	5	12	19	RV	RV	RV	RV	24	23	19	20	18
Penn State	AP				RV	RV	RV	23	20	21	20	RV	RV	24	22	13	9	16	20	RV	RV
Penn State	C			RV	RV	RV		24	21	21	20	RV	RV	23	20	13	9	14	20	RV	RV
Purdue	AP	23	RV	RV	RV	RV	RV	RV	RV	RV	RV	RV	RV	RV		RV					RV
Purdue	C	22		RV	RV	RV	RV	RV	RV	RV	RV	RV	RV			RV					
Rutgers	AP											RV	24	25	RV	RV	RV			RV	RV
Rutgers	C											RV	25	25	RV	RV	RV			RV	RV
Wisconsin	AP			RV	RV						RV	RV	RV	RV				RV	24	18	17
Wisconsin	C			RV	RV						RV	RV	RV		RV		RV	RV	24	19	19

On December 2, 2019, Michigan tied the 1989–90 Kansas Jayhawks for the largest jump in the history of the AP Poll as they jumped from unranked to No. 4.

=== Early season tournaments ===
Nine of the 14 Big Ten teams participated in early season tournaments. All Big Ten teams participated in the ACC–Big Ten Challenge against Atlantic Coast Conference teams, the 21st year for the event. Eight of the 14 teams participated in the Gavitt Tipoff Games, including Michigan State who participated for the first time.

Team	Tournament	Finish
Iowa	Las Vegas Invitational	2nd
Maryland	Orlando Invitational	1st
Michigan	Battle 4 Atlantis	1st
Michigan State	Maui Invitational	5th
Nebraska	Cayman Islands Classic	3rd
Northwestern	Fort Myers Tip-Off	4th
Purdue	Emerald Coast Classic	2nd
Penn State	NIT Season Tip-Off	3rd
Wisconsin	Legends Classic	4th

=== Player of the week ===
Throughout the conference regular season, the Big Ten offices named one or two players of the week and one or two freshmen of the week each Monday.

Cassius Winston was named the Naismith National Player of the Week on January 6, 2020.

Week	Player of the week	Freshman of the week
November 11, 2019	Nate Reuvers, Wisconsin	Kofi Cockburn, Illinois
November 18, 2019	Kaleb Wesson, Ohio State	Trayce Jackson-Davis, Indiana
November 18, 2019	Kaleb Wesson, Ohio State	Malik Hall, Michigan State
November 25, 2019	Kofi Cockburn, Illinois	Kofi Cockburn (2), Illinois
December 2, 2019	Anthony Cowan Jr., Maryland	Trayce Jackson-Davis (2), Indiana
December 2, 2019	Jon Teske, Michigan	Trayce Jackson-Davis (2), Indiana
December 9, 2019	Luka Garza, Iowa	Kofi Cockburn (3), Illinois
December 16, 2019	Lamar Stevens, Penn State	Trayce Jackson-Davis (3), Indiana
December 16, 2019	Lamar Stevens, Penn State	Kofi Cockburn (4), Illinois
December 23, 2019	Gabe Kalscheur, Minnesota	Armaan Franklin, Indiana
December 23, 2019	D'Mitrik Trice, Wisconsin	D.J. Carton, Ohio State
December 30, 2019	Daniel Oturu, Minnesota	Kofi Cockburn (5), Illinois
January 6, 2020	Cassius Winston, Michigan State	Joe Toussaint, Iowa
January 13, 2020	Daniel Oturu (2), Minnesota	Kofi Cockburn (6), Illinois
January 13, 2020	Trevion Williams, Purdue	Kofi Cockburn (6), Illinois
January 20, 2020	Luka Garza (2), Iowa	CJ Fredrick, Iowa
January 27, 2020	Jalen Smith, Maryland	Kofi Cockburn (7), Illinois
February 3, 2020	Anthony Cowan Jr. (2), Maryland	Franz Wagner, Michigan
February 10, 2020	Lamar Stevens (2), Penn State	Trayce Jackson-Davis (4), Indiana
February 17, 2020	Anthony Cowan Jr. (3), Maryland	Franz Wagner (2), Michigan
February 24, 2020	Ayo Dosunmu, Illinois	Trayce Jackson-Davis (5), Indiana
March 2, 2020	Cassius Winston (2), Michigan State	Franz Wagner (3), Michigan

=== Conference matrix ===
This table summarizes the head-to-head results between teams in conference play. Each team will play 20 conference games, and at least one game against each opponent.

	Illinois	Indiana	Iowa	Maryland	Michigan	Michigan St	Minnesota	Nebraska	Northwestern	Ohio St	Penn St	Purdue	Rutgers	Wisconsin
vs. Illinois	–	0–1	1–1	2–0	0–2	2–0	0–1	0–1	0–2	1–0	0–1	0–2	1–1	0–1
vs. Indiana	1–0	–	0–1	2–0	1-0	0–1	0–2	0–2	0–1	1–1	1–1	2–0	1–0	2–0
vs. Iowa	1–1	1–0	–	1–1	1–1	1–0	0–2	1–1	0–1	0–1	1–1	2–0	0–1	0–1
vs. Maryland	0–2	0–2	1–1	–	0–1	1–1	0–1	0–1	0–2	1–1	1–0	0–1	1–1	1–0
vs. Michigan	2–0	0–1	1–1	1–0	–	1–1	1–0	0–2	0–1	2–0	1–0	0–2	0–2	1–0
vs. Michigan St	0–2	1–0	0–1	1–1	1–1	–	0–2	0–1	0–2	0–1	1–1	1–0	0–1	1–1
vs. Minnesota	1–0	2–0	2–0	1–0	0–1	2–0	–	0–1	0–2	0–2	1–1	1–0	1–0	1–1
vs. Nebraska	1–0	2–0	1–1	1–0	2–0	1–0	1–0	–	2–0	2–0	1–0	0–1	2–0	2–0
vs. Northwestern	2–0	1–0	1–0	2–0	1–0	2–0	2–0	0–2	–	1–0	1–0	2–0	1–0	1–0
vs. Ohio State	0–1	1–1	1–0	1–1	0–2	1–0	2–0	0–2	0–1	–	1–1	0–1	0–1	2–0
vs. Penn State	1–0	1–1	1–1	0–1	0–1	1–1	1–1	0–1	0–1	1–1	–	0–1	1–1	1–0
vs. Purdue	2–0	0–2	0–2	1–0	2–0	0–1	0–1	1–0	0–2	1–0	1–0	–	2–0	1–1
vs. Rutgers	1–1	0–1	1–0	1–1	2–0	1–0	0–1	0–2	0–1	1–0	1–1	0–2	–	1–1
vs. Wisconsin	1–0	0–2	1–0	0–1	0–1	1–1	1–1	0–2	0–1	0–2	0–1	1–1	1–1	–
Total	**13–7**	**9–11**	**11–9**	**14–6**	**10–10**	**14–6**	**8–12**	**2–18**	**3–17**	**11–9**	**11–9**	**9–11**	**11–9**	**14–6**

For the 44th consecutive season, the Big Ten Conference led the nation in average attendance. The Big Ten average men's basketball attendance of 12,709 outpaced the SEC (11,188), ACC (10,886), Big 12 (10,521) and Big East (10,130). Wisconsin (6th, 16,912), Indiana (10th, 16,300), Nebraska (11th, 15,605), Maryland (13th, 15,336), Purdue (16th, 14,804), Michigan State (17th, 14,797), Ohio State (18th, 14,531), Illinois (24th, 13,041), Michigan (26th, 12,539) and Iowa (27th, 12,357) were all among the top 30 of the 350 schools that host Division I basketball.

== Honors and awards ==
=== All-Big Ten awards and teams ===
On March 9, 2020, the Big Ten announced most of its conference awards.

Honor	Coaches	Media
Player of the Year	Luka Garza, Iowa	Luka Garza, Iowa
Coach of the Year	Greg Gard, Wisconsin	Greg Gard, Wisconsin
Freshman of the Year	Kofi Cockburn, Illinois	Kofi Cockburn, Illinois
Defensive Player of the Year	Xavier Tillman, Michigan State	Not Selected
Sixth Man of the Year	Aaron Wiggins, Maryland	Not Selected
All-Big Ten First Team	Luka Garza, Iowa	Luka Garza, Iowa
All-Big Ten First Team	Jalen Smith, Maryland	Jalen Smith, Maryland
All-Big Ten First Team	Lamar Stevens, Penn State	Lamar Stevens, Penn State
All-Big Ten First Team	Cassius Winston, Michigan State	Cassius Winston, Michigan State
All-Big Ten First Team	Anthony Cowan Jr., Maryland	Ayo Dosunmu, Illinois
All-Big Ten Second Team	Ayo Dosunmu, Illinois	Anthony Cowan Jr., Maryland
All-Big Ten Second Team	Daniel Oturu, Minnesota	Daniel Oturu, Minnesota
All-Big Ten Second Team	Zavier Simpson, Michigan	Zavier Simpson, Michigan
All-Big Ten Second Team	Xavier Tillman, Michigan State	Xavier Tillman, Michigan State
All-Big Ten Second Team	Kaleb Wesson, Ohio State	Kaleb Wesson, Ohio State
All-Big Ten Third Team	Trayce Jackson-Davis, Indiana	Kofi Cockburn, Illinois
All-Big Ten Third Team	Nate Reuvers, Wisconsin	Trayce Jackson-Davis, Indiana
All-Big Ten Third Team	D'Mitrik Trice, Wisconsin	Nate Reuvers, Wisconsin
All-Big Ten Third Team	Joe Wieskamp, Iowa	Joe Wieskamp, Iowa
All-Big Ten Third Team	Geo Baker, Rutgers	Marcus Carr, Minnesota
All-Big Ten Honorable Mention	Marcus Carr, Minnesota	Geo Baker, Rutgers
All-Big Ten Honorable Mention	Kofi Cockburn, Illinois	Ron Harper Jr., Rutgers
All-Big Ten Honorable Mention	Ron Harper Jr., Rutgers	Myreon Jones, Penn State
All-Big Ten Honorable Mention	Trevion Williams, Purdue	Isaiah Livers, Michigan
All-Big Ten Honorable Mention	Not Selected	Cam Mack, Nebraska
All-Big Ten Honorable Mention	Not Selected	Darryl Morsell, Maryland
All-Big Ten Honorable Mention	Not Selected	D'Mitrik Trice, Wisconsin
All-Big Ten Honorable Mention	Not Selected	Trevion Williams, Purdue
All-Freshman Team	Kofi Cockburn, Illinois	Not Selected
All-Freshman Team	CJ Fredrick, Iowa	Not Selected
All-Freshman Team	Trayce Jackson-Davis, Indiana	Not Selected
All-Freshman Team	Franz Wagner, Michigan	Not Selected
All-Freshman Team	Rocket Watts, Michigan State	Not Selected
All-Defensive Team	Nojel Eastern, Purdue	Not Selected
All-Defensive Team	Daniel Oturu, Minnesota	Not Selected
All-Defensive Team	Jalen Smith, Maryland	Not Selected
All-Defensive Team	Xavier Tillman, Michigan State	Not Selected
All-Defensive Team	Jamari Wheeler, Penn State	Not Selected

=== USBWA ===
On March 10, the U.S. Basketball Writers Association released its Men's All-District Teams, based upon voting from its national membership. There were nine regions from coast to coast, and a player and coach of the year were selected in each. The following lists all the Big Ten representatives selected within their respective regions.

District II (NY, NJ, DE, DC, PA, WV)
- Lamar Stevens, Penn State
District III (VA, NC, SC, MD)
- Anthony Cowan, Maryland
- Jalen Smith, Maryland
District V (OH, IN, IL, MI, MN, WI)
- Ayo Dosunmu, Illinois
- Daniel Oturu, Minnesota
- Zavier Simpson, Michigan
- Xavier Tillman, Michigan State
- Kaleb Wesson, Ohio State
- Cassius Winston, Michigan State
District VI (IA, MO, KS, OK, NE, ND, SD)

Player of the Year

- Luka Garza, Iowa

All-District Team

- Luka Garza, Iowa,
- Joe Wieskamp, Iowa

=== NABC ===
The National Association of Basketball Coaches announced their Division I All-District teams on March 22, recognizing the nation's best men's collegiate basketball student-athletes. Selected and voted on by member coaches of the NABC, the selections on this list were then eligible for NABC Coaches' All-America Honors. The following list represented the District 7 players chosen to the list.

First Team

- Cassius Winston, Michigan State
- Lamar Stevens, Penn State
- Luka Garza, Iowa
- Anthony Cowan Jr., Maryland
- Daniel Oturu, Minnesota

Second Team

- Jalen Smith, Maryland
- Ayo Dosunmu, Illinois
- Joe Wieskamp, Iowa
- Kaleb Wesson, Ohio State
- Zavier Simpson, Michigan

== Postseason ==
=== Big Ten tournament ===
After the first two games of the tournament were played on March 11, the conference canceled the remainder of the tournament due to the ongoing COVID-19 pandemic.

First round Wednesday, March 11; BTN
12	Minnesota	72
13	Northwestern	57
11	Indiana	89
14	Nebraska	64

Second round Thursday, March 12; BTN
8	Rutgers
9	Michigan
5	Iowa
12	Minnesota
7	Ohio State
10	Purdue
6	Penn State
11	Indiana

Quarterfinals; Friday, March 13; BTN
1	Wisconsin
4	Illinois
2	Michigan State
3	Maryland

Semifinals; Saturday, March 14; CBS

Championship; Sunday, March 15; CBS

=== 2020 NBA draft ===
The following four players from the Big Ten Conference were drafted in the 2020 NBA draft.

Round	Pick	Overall	Player	Position	Nationality (Note: Nationality indicates the player's national team or representative nationality. If a player has not competed at the international level, then the nationality indicates the national team which the player is eligible to represent according to FIBA rules.)	NBA club	B1G team
1	10	10	Jalen Smith	PF/C	United States	Phoenix Suns	Maryland (So.)
2	3	33	Daniel Oturu	C	United States	Minnesota Timberwolves (traded to L.A. Clippers) (Note: November 19, 2020: Minnesota Timberwolves to Los Angeles Clippers: L.A. Clippers acquired the draft rights to Daniel Oturu; Minnesota acquired the draft rights to Mathias Lessort and Detroit's 2023 second-round pick)	Minnesota (So.)
2	5	35	Xavier Tillman	PF	United States	Sacramento Kings (from Detroit via Phoenix, (Note: July 9, 2015: Detroit Pistons to Phoenix Suns: Phoenix acquired a 2020 second-round pick; Detroit acquired Marcus Morris, Reggie Bullock, and Danny Granger; June 23, 2016: Phoenix Suns to Sacramento Kings, Sacramento acquired the draft rights to Bogdan Bogdanović, Georgios Papagiannis, Skal Labissière, and Detroit's 2020 second-round pick; Phoenix acquired the draft rights to Marquese Chriss) traded to Memphis) (Note: November 19, 2020: Sacramento Kings to Memphis Grizzlies: Memphis acquired the draft rights to Xavier Tillman; Sacramento acquired the draft rights to Robert Woodard II and a 2022 second-round pick)	Michigan State (Jr.)
2	23	53	Cassius Winston	PG	United States	Oklahoma City Thunder (traded to Washington) (Note: November 19, 2020: Washington Wizards to Oklahoma City Thunder: Oklahoma City acquired Admiral Schofield and the draft rights to Vít Krejčí; Washington acquired the draft rights to Cassius Winston (selected 53rd overall) and a 2024 second-round pick)	Michigan State (Sr.)
