= 2019–20 Illinois Fighting Illini men's basketball team =

American college basketball season

2019–20 Illinois Fighting Illini men's basketball
- Conference: Big Ten Conference

Ranking
- Coaches: No. 22
- AP: No. 21
- Record: 21–10 (13–7 Big Ten)
- Head coach: Brad Underwood (3rd season)
- Assistant coaches: Orlando Antigua (3rd season); Stephen Gentry (1st season); Ron Coleman (3rd season)
- Captains: Ayo Dosunmu; Andres Feliz
- Home arena: State Farm Center

2019–20 Big Ten Conference men's basketball standings
| | Conf. | | | | Overall |
| Team | W | | L | PCT | W | | L | PCT |
|---|---|---|---|---|---|---|---|---|
| No. 17 Wisconsin | 14 | – | 6 | .700 | 21 | – | 10 | .677 |
| No. 9 Michigan State | 14 | – | 6 | .700 | 22 | – | 9 | .710 |
| No. 12 Maryland | 14 | – | 6 | .700 | 24 | – | 7 | .774 |
| No. 21 Illinois | 13 | – | 7 | .650 | 21 | – | 10 | .677 |
| No. 25 Iowa | 11 | – | 9 | .550 | 20 | – | 11 | .645 |
| Penn State | 11 | – | 9 | .550 | 21 | – | 10 | .677 |
| No. 19 Ohio State | 11 | – | 9 | .550 | 21 | – | 10 | .677 |
| Rutgers | 11 | – | 9 | .550 | 20 | – | 11 | .645 |
| Michigan | 10 | – | 10 | .500 | 19 | – | 12 | .613 |
| Purdue | 9 | – | 11 | .450 | 16 | – | 15 | .516 |
| Indiana | 9 | – | 11 | .450 | 20 | – | 12 | .625 |
| Minnesota | 8 | – | 12 | .400 | 15 | – | 16 | .484 |
| Northwestern | 3 | – | 17 | .150 | 8 | – | 23 | .258 |
| Nebraska | 2 | – | 18 | .100 | 7 | – | 25 | .219 |
The 2020 Big Ten tournament was canceled prior to the second round due to the COVID-19 pandemic. Rankings from AP poll

The 2019–20 Illinois Fighting Illini men's basketball team represented the University of Illinois at Urbana–Champaign in the 2019–20 NCAA Division I men's basketball season. Led by third-year head coach Brad Underwood, the Illini played their home games at State Farm Center in Champaign, Illinois as members of the Big Ten Conference. The Illini finished the season 21–10, 13–7 in Big Ten play to finish in fourth place. Their season ended following the cancellation of postseason tournaments due to the COVID-19 pandemic.

== Previous season ==
The Illini finished the 2018–19 season 12–21, 7–13 in Big Ten play and finished in a three-way tie for 10th place. Due to the tie-breaking rules, they received the No. 11 seed in the Big Ten tournament where they defeated Northwestern in the first round before losing to Iowa in the second round.

== Offseason ==
The Illini took a trip to Italy and compiled a 3-1 record, beating the three Italian teams they faced and losing to the Dutch team. Cockburn and Feliz did not come on the trip due to visa issues.

=== Departures ===
| Name | Number | Pos. | Height | Weight | Year | Hometown | Notes |
|---|---|---|---|---|---|---|---|
| Drew Cayce | 3 | G | 6'1" | 175 | RS Junior | Libertyville, IL | Graduated |
| Adonis de La Rosa | 12 | C | 7'0" | 265 | RS Senior | Bronx, NY | Graduated |
| Anthony Higgs | 22 | F | 6'8" | 215 | Freshman | Baltimore, MD | Transferred to Chipola College |
| Aaron Jordan | 23 | G | 6'5" | 210 | Senior | Plainfield, IL | Graduated |
| Samba Kane | 34 | C | 7'0" | 220 | Freshman | Dakar, Senegal | Transferred to Indian Hills Community College |

=== 2019 recruiting class ===
College recruiting
| Name | Hometown | School | Height | Weight | Commit date |
|---|---|---|---|---|---|
| Benjamin Bosmans-Verdonk; PF | Lommel, Belgium | KA Pegasus | 6 ft 8 in (2.03 m) | 225 lb (102 kg) | Jun 8, 2019 |
| Benjamin Bosmans-Verdonk; PF | Recruit ratings: No ratings found | | | | |
| Kofi Cockburn; C | Kingston, Jamaica | Christ the King (NY) / Oak Hill Academy (VA) | 6 ft 11 in (2.11 m) | 290 lb (130 kg) | Jan 6, 2019 |
| Kofi Cockburn; C | Recruit ratings: Rivals: 247Sports: ESPN: (89) | | | | |
| Jermaine Hamlin; C | Lincoln, Illinois | Lincoln | 6 ft 10 in (2.08 m) | 240 lb (110 kg) | Aug 20, 2019 |
| Jermaine Hamlin; C | Recruit ratings: No ratings found | | | | |
Overall recruit ranking: Rivals: 58 247Sports: 70 On3: 56
Note: In many cases, Scout, Rivals, 247Sports, On3, and ESPN may conflict in their listings of height and weight.; In these cases, the average was taken. ESPN grades are on a 100-point scale.; Sources: "2019 Illinois Commits". Rivals.; "ESPN- Illinois Fighting Illini Men's Basketball Recruiting". ESPN.; "2019 Team Ranking". Rivals.; "2019–20 Illinois Fighting Illini men's basketball team". 247Sports.; "2019–20 Illinois Fighting Illini men's basketball team". On3.

== Roster ==
2019–20 Illinois Fighting Illini men's basketball team
Players
Coaches

| Pos. | # | Name | Height | Weight | Year | Previous school | Hometown |
|---|---|---|---|---|---|---|---|
| G | 0 | Alan Griffin | 6 ft 5 in (1.96 m) | 195 lb (88 kg) | So | Oak Park and River Forest HS/Archbishop Stepinac HS | White Plains, New York |
| G | 1 | Trent Frazier | 6 ft 2 in (1.88 m) | 175 lb (79 kg) | Jr | Wellington High School (FL) | West Palm Beach, Florida |
| F | 2 | Kipper Nichols | 6 ft 6 in (1.98 m) | 220 lb (100 kg) | RS Sr | St. Edward High School (OH) | Cleveland, Ohio |
| G/F | 3 | Jacob Grandison (redshirt) | 6 ft 6 in (1.98 m) | 220 lb (100 kg) | Jr | Phillips Exeter Academy / Holy Cross | Oakland, California |
| F | 4 | Zach Griffith (W) | 6 ft 6 in (1.98 m) | 210 lb (95 kg) | Jr | Fisher High School | Fisher, Illinois |
| F | 5 | Tevian Jones | 6 ft 7 in (2.01 m) | 205 lb (93 kg) | So | Culver City High School | Culver City, California |
| G | 10 | Andrés Feliz (C) | 6 ft 2 in (1.88 m) | 195 lb (88 kg) | Sr | West Oaks Academy/Northwest Florida State | Santo Domingo, Dominican Republic |
| G | 11 | Ayo Dosunmu (C) | 6 ft 5 in (1.96 m) | 185 lb (84 kg) | So | Morgan Park High School | Chicago, Illinois |
| F | 13 | Benjamin Bosmans-Verdonk (injured) (redshirt) | 6 ft 7 in (2.01 m) | 220 lb (100 kg) | Fr | KA Pegasus | Lommel, Belgium |
| F | 15 | Giorgi Bezhanishvili | 6 ft 9 in (2.06 m) | 235 lb (107 kg) | So | St. Patrick High School | Rustavi, Georgia |
| G | 20 | Da'Monte Williams | 6 ft 3 in (1.91 m) | 210 lb (95 kg) | Jr | Manual High School | Peoria, Illinois |
| C | 21 | Kofi Cockburn | 7 ft 0 in (2.13 m) | 290 lb (132 kg) | Fr | Oak Hill Academy (VA) | Kingston, Jamaica |
| G | 22 | Austin Hutcherson (redshirt) | 6 ft 6 in (1.98 m) | 175 lb (79 kg) | Jr | Hun School of Princeton / Wesleyan | New York City |
| G | 32 | Tyler Underwood (W) | 6 ft 2 in (1.88 m) | 180 lb (82 kg) | GS | Nacogdoches High School / Oklahoma State | Nacogdoches, Texas |
| F/C | 34 | Jermaine Hamlin | 6 ft 10 in (2.08 m) | 240 lb (109 kg) | Fr | Lincoln | Lincoln, Illinois |
| G | 35 | Samson Oladimeji (W) | 6 ft 4 in (1.93 m) | 210 lb (95 kg) | Sr | William Fremd High School | Rolling Meadows, Illinois |

Head coach

- Brad Underwood (Kansas State)

Assistant coach(es)

- Orlando Antigua (Pittsburgh)
- Ron Coleman (Lamar)
- Stephen Gentry (Gonzaga)

Legend

- (C) Team captain
- (S) Suspended
- (I) Ineligible
- (W) Walk-on
- Injured
- Current redshirt

Roster
Last update: November 6, 2019

Note: Alan Griffin would later be removed from the roster site due to transferring out of the program.

== Schedule and results ==
| Date time, TV | Rank^{#} | Opponent^{#} | Result | Record | High points | High rebounds | High assists | Site (attendance) city, state |
Italy Trip
| August 6, 2019*; 12:00 p.m. | | at CUS Insubria | W 118-56 | 1–0 | 27 – Dosunmu | 11 – Griffin | 5 – Dosunmu | (273); Varese, Italy |
| August 7, 2019*; 1:00 p.m. | | at Gazzada All-Stars | W 112-63 | 2–0 | 31 – Griffin | 9 – Bezhanishvili | 8 – Williams | (763); Gazzada Schianno, Italy |
| August 9, 2019*; 1:00 p.m. | | at Livorno All-Stars | W 107-74 | 3-0 | 26 – Dosunmu | 10 – Jones | 4 – Williams | (337); Livorno, Italy |
| August 10, 2019*; 12:00 p.m. | | vs. The Netherlands National B Team | L 72-82 | 3–1 | 27 – Dosunmu | 6 – Tied | 4 – Dosunmu | (171); Roma, Italy |
Exhibition
| November 1, 2019*; 8:00 p.m., BTN Plus | | Lewis | W 83–50 | 0–0 | 16 – Cockburn | 11 – Cockburn | 4 – Dosunmu | State Farm Center (12,867); Champaign, IL |
Regular season
| November 5, 2019*; 7:00 p.m., BTN Plus | | Nicholls | W 78–70 ^{OT} | 1–0 | 23 – Feliz | 11 – Tied | 4 – Frazier | State Farm Center (10,034); Champaign, IL |
| November 8, 2019*; 8:00 pm, WCIX | | at Grand Canyon | W 83–71 | 2–0 | 23 – Cockburn | 14 – Cockburn | 6 – Dosunmu | GCU Arena (7,498); Phoenix, AZ |
| November 10, 2019*; 8:00 p.m., P12N | | at No. 21 Arizona | L 69–90 | 2–1 | 15 – Dosunmu | 10 – Feliz | 4 – Dosunmu | McKale Center (13,780); Tucson, AZ |
| November 18, 2019*; 7:00 p.m., ESPNU | | Hawaii; O’ahu Classic | W 66–53 | 3–1 | 15 – Cockburn | 14 – Cockburn | 5 – Feliz | State Farm Center (11,589); Champaign, IL |
| November 20, 2019*; 8:00 p.m., BTN | | The Citadel; O’ahu Classic | W 85–57 | 4–1 | 18 – Cockburn | 17 – Cockburn | 5 – Frazier | State Farm Center (11,196); Champaign, IL |
| November 23, 2019*; 7:00 p.m., BTN Plus | | Hampton; O’ahu Classic | W 120–71 | 5–1 | 20 – Dosunmu | 13 – Cockburn | 5 – Tied | State Farm Center (9,732); Champaign, IL |
| November 26, 2019*; 7:00 pm, BTN Plus | | Lindenwood; O’ahu Classic | W 117–65 | 6–1 | 24 – Dosunmu | 8 – Cockburn | 9 – Feliz | State Farm Center (9,712); Champaign, IL |
| December 2, 2019*; 6:00 p.m., ESPN2 | | Miami (FL); ACC–Big Ten Challenge | L 79–81 | 6–2 | 23 – Cockburn | 8 – Bezhanishvili | 5 – Bezhanishvili | State Farm Center (11,819); Champaign, IL |
| December 7, 2019; 4:00 p.m., ESPN2 | | at No. 3 Maryland | L 58–59 | 6–3 (0–1) | 13 – Frazier | 8 – Tied | 3 – Dosunmu | Xfinity Center (16,690); College Park, MD |
| December 11, 2019; 8:00 p.m., BTN | | No. 5 Michigan | W 71–62 | 7–3 (1–1) | 19 – Cockburn | 10 – Cockburn | 3 – Dosunmu | State Farm Center (13,277); Champaign, IL |
| December 14, 2019*; 5:00 p.m., BTN | | Old Dominion | W 69–55 | 8–3 | 15 – Griffin | 9 – Cockburn | 4 – Bezhanishvili | State Farm Center (13,276); Champaign, IL |
| December 21, 2019*; 12:00 pm, SECN | | vs. Missouri; Braggin' Rights | L 56–63 | 8–4 | 21 – Dosunmu | 6 – Griffin | 2 – Bezhanishvili | Enterprise Center (15,259); St. Louis, MO |
| December 29, 2019*; 1:00 p.m., ESPNU | | North Carolina A&T | W 95–64 | 9–4 | 26 – Cockburn | 9 – Cockburn | 5 – Bezhanishvili | State Farm Center (13,676); Champaign, IL |
| January 2, 2020; 7:00 p.m., FS1 | | at No. 14 Michigan State | L 56–76 | 9–5 (1–2) | 18 – Dosunmu | 9 – Cockburn | 4 – Frazier | Breslin Student Events Center (14,797); East Lansing, MI |
| January 5, 2020; 7:00 p.m., FS1 | | Purdue | W 63–37 | 10–5 (2–2) | 16 – Griffin | 12 – Griffin | 6 – Feliz | State Farm Center (12,153); Champaign, IL |
| January 8, 2020; 8:00 p.m., BTN | | at Wisconsin | W 71–70 | 11–5 (3–2) | 18 – Dosunmu | 6 – Cockburn | 6 – Dosunmu | Kohl Center (16,108); Madison, WI |
| January 11, 2020; 11:00 a.m., BTN | | Rutgers | W 54–51 | 12–5 (4–2) | 18 – Dosunmu | 17 – Cockburn | 2 – Tied | State Farm Center (11,070); Champaign, IL |
| January 18, 2020; 4:00 p.m., BTN | No. 24 | Northwestern; Rivalry | W 75–71 | 13–5 (5–2) | 16 – Frazier | 7 – Cockburn | 6 – Dosunmu | State Farm Center (14,131); Champaign, IL |
| January 21, 2020; 6:00 p.m., ESPNU | No. 21 | at Purdue | W 79–62 | 14–5 (6–2) | 22 – Cockburn | 15 – Cockburn | 11 – Dosunmu | Mackey Arena (14,804); West Lafayette, IN |
| January 25, 2020; 11:00 a.m., FS1 | No. 21 | at Michigan | W 64–62 | 15–5 (7–2) | 27 – Dosunmu | 7 – Dosunmu | 2 – Dosunmu | Crisler Center (12,707); Ann Arbor, MI |
| January 30, 2020; 6:30 p.m., FS1 | No. 19 | Minnesota | W 59–51 | 16–5 (8–2) | 17 – Feliz | 10 – Cockburn | 4 – Bezhanishvili | State Farm Center (15,544); Champaign, IL |
| February 2, 2020; 12:00 p.m., FS1 | No. 19 | at No. 18 Iowa; Rivalry | L 65–72 | 16–6 (8–3) | 17 – Feliz | 6 – Tied | 3 – Dosunmu | Carver–Hawkeye Arena (15,056); Iowa City, IA |
| February 7, 2020; 7:00 p.m., FS1 | No. 20 | No. 9 Maryland | L 66–75 | 16–7 (8–4) | 16 – Dosunmu | 9 – Griffin | 4 – Dosunmu | State Farm Center (15,544); Champaign, IL |
| February 11, 2020; 8:00 p.m., ESPN | No. 22 | Michigan State | L 69–70 | 16–8 (8–5) | 17 – Dosunmu | 9 – Dosunmu | 4 – Frazier | State Farm Center (15,544); Champaign, IL |
| February 15, 2020; 3:30 p.m., BTN | No. 22 | at Rutgers | L 57–72 | 16–9 (8–6) | 14 – Griffin | 10 – Cockburn | 4 – Feliz | Louis Brown Athletic Center (8,000); Piscataway, NJ |
| February 18, 2020; 5:30 p.m., FS1 | | at No. 9 Penn State | W 62–56 | 17–9 (9–6) | 24 – Dosunmu | 7 – Tied | 4 – Williams | Bryce Jordan Center (9,506); University Park, PA |
| February 24, 2020; 7:00 p.m., BTN | | Nebraska | W 71–59 | 18–9 (10–6) | 18 – Dosunmu | 10 – Cockburn | 3 – Tied | State Farm Center (15,354); Champaign, IL |
| February 27, 2020; 7:00 p.m., BTN | | at Northwestern; Rivalry | W 74–66 | 19–9 (11–6) | 24 – Griffin | 14 – Cockburn | 7 – Feliz | Welsh–Ryan Arena (7,039); Evanston, IL |
| March 1, 2020; 1:00 p.m., BTN | | Indiana; Rivalry | W 67–66 | 20–9 (12–6) | 17 – Dosunmu | 7 – Feliz | 4 – Feliz | State Farm Center (15,554); Champaign, IL |
| March 5, 2020; 6:00 p.m., ESPN | No. 23 | at No. 19 Ohio State | L 63–71 | 20–10 (12–7) | 21 – Dosunmu | 11 – Feliz | 5 – Dosunmu | Value City Arena (16,382); Columbus, OH |
| March 8, 2020; 6:00 p.m., BTN | No. 23 | No. 18 Iowa; Rivalry | W 78–76 | 21–10 (13–7) | 17 – Dosunmu | 8 – Cockburn | 8 – Dosunmu | State Farm Center (15,554); Champaign, IL |
Big Ten tournament
Canceled
NCAA Tournament
Canceled
*Non-conference game. ^{#}Rankings from AP Poll. (#) Tournament seedings in parentheses. All times are in Eastern Time.

== Rankings ==
Ranking movements Legend: ██ Increase in ranking ██ Decrease in ranking — = Not ranked RV = Received votes т = Tied with team above or below
| | Week | | | | | | | | | | | | | | | | | | | |
| Poll | Pre | 1 | 2 | 3 | 4 | 5 | 6 | 7 | 8 | 9 | 10 | 11 | 12 | 13 | 14 | 15 | 16 | 17 | 18 | Final |
|---|---|---|---|---|---|---|---|---|---|---|---|---|---|---|---|---|---|---|---|---|
| AP | RV | RV | — | — | — | — | — | — | — | — | 24 | 21 | 19 | 20 | 22 | RV | RV | 23 | 21 | 21 |
| Coaches | RV | — | — | — | — | — | — | RV | — | — | RV | 22 | 19 | 21 | 23 | RV | RV | 22-T | 22 | 22 |

*AP does not release post-NCAA Tournament rankings
