= Hunter Dickinson =

American basketball player (born 2000)

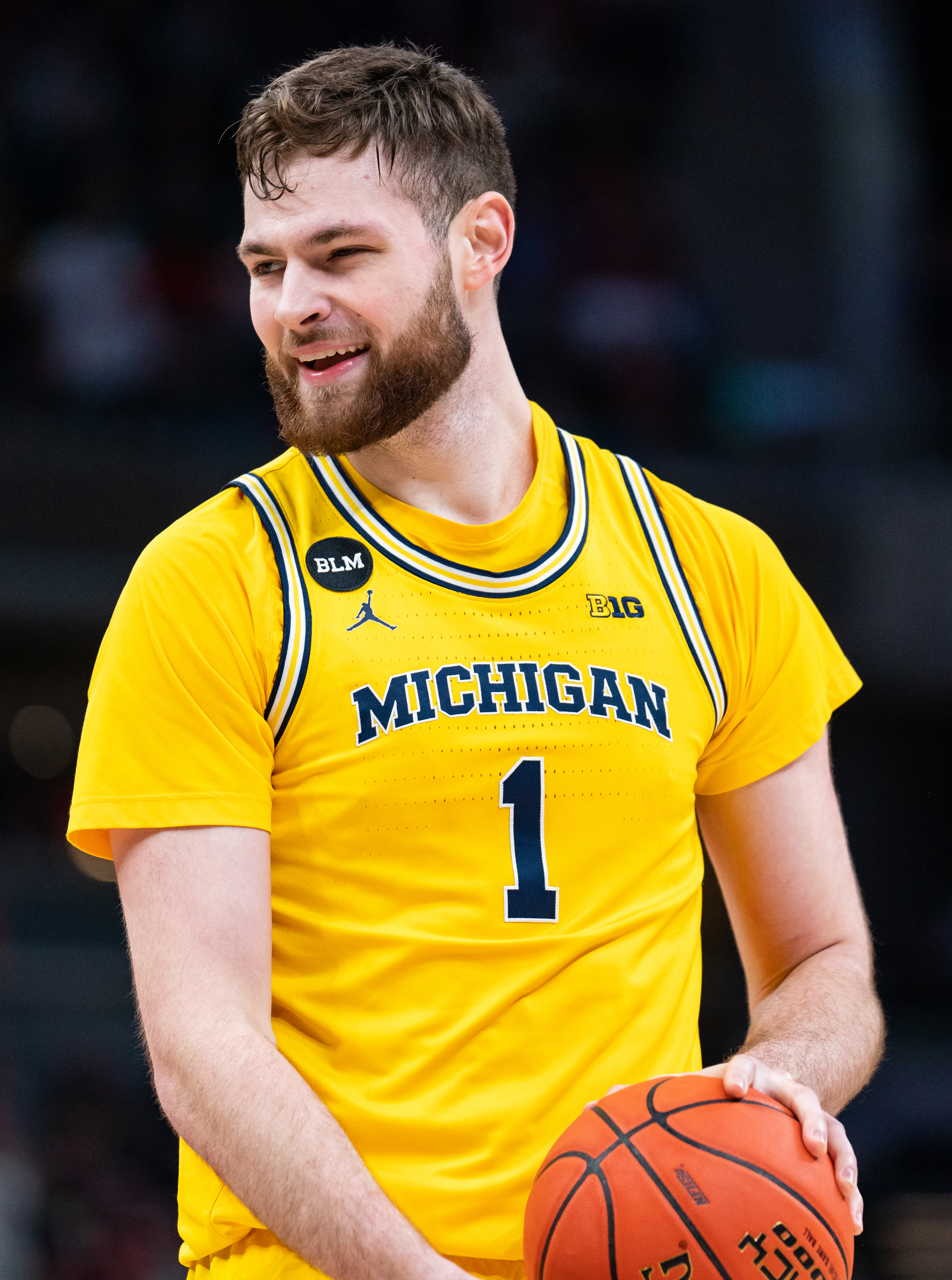
- Dickinson with Michigan in 2022

No. 4 – Laketown Squadron
- Position: Center
- League: NBA G League

Personal information
- Born: November 25, 2000 (age 25) Alexandria, Virginia, U.S.
- Listed height: 7 ft 1 in (2.16 m)
- Listed weight: 255 lb (116 kg)

Career information
- High school: DeMatha Catholic (Hyattsville, Maryland)
- College: Michigan (2020–2023); Kansas (2023–2025)
- NBA draft: 2025: undrafted
- Playing career: 2025–present

Career history
- 2025–2026: New Orleans Pelicans
- 2025–2026: →Birmingham Squadron
- 2026–present: Laketown Squadron

Career highlights
- 2× Consensus second-team All-American (2021, 2024); Third-team All-American – AP, USBWA (2025); 2× First-team All-Big 12 (2024, 2025); Big 12 Newcomer of the Year (2024); Big 12 All-Newcomer team (2024); 2× First-team All-Big Ten (2021, 2023); Second-team All-Big Ten (2022); Big Ten All-Defensive Team (2022); Big Ten Freshman of the Year (2021); Big Ten All-Freshman Team (2021)
- Stats at NBA.com
- Stats at Basketball Reference

Hunter Ryan Dickinson (born November 25, 2000) is an American professional basketball player for the Laketown Squadron of the NBA G League. He played college basketball for the Michigan Wolverines and Kansas Jayhawks.

Dickinson attended DeMatha Catholic High School in Hyattsville, Maryland. In high school, he was a Jordan Brand Classic honoree and the Maryland Gatorade Player of the Year in 2020, as well as a two-time state champion.

Dickinson was named a consensus second-team 2021 NCAA Men's Basketball All-American as a freshman for the 2020–21 Big Ten regular season champion Michigan Wolverines. During his three years at Michigan, the school reached the NCAA tournament Sweet Sixteen twice, advancing to the Elite Eight once. He was a three-time All-Big Ten (twice first team) honoree, leading Michigan in scoring and rebounding in all three seasons. Dickinson transferred to Kansas as a senior and played two seasons there, being granted a fifth year of eligibility. He was a 2024 and 2025 NCAA All-American and a two-time first-team All-Big 12 Conference honoree. He was the first men's basketball player recognized as a consensus All-American at two different schools.

During his first year as a professional basketball player he was selected for the 2026 NBA G League Next Up Game presented by AT&T. His NBA G League first-year performance was highlighted by efforts that broke (24) and then rebroke (27) the Birmingham Squadron single-game rebound record.

== Early life ==
Dickinson was born to Kathy and Tim Dickinson on November 25, 2000 in Alexandria, Virginia. Dickinson's mother, Kathy, played volleyball for Niagara. Dickinson's father, Tim, played collegiate baseball at Buffalo State University. He is a fan of the Buffalo Bills.

Dickinson has brothers—Ben, Grant and Jason. His older brother Ben played college basketball for NCAA Division I Binghamton, Loyola Marymount and UNC Greensboro. Ben (6 ft 9 in [2.06 m]) who attended Gonzaga High School and was a 2011–12 America East All-Rookie Team selection, also played as a graduate student for NCAA Division II Cal State San Marcos. After playing for T. C. Williams High School and the 2015–16 season for Division II Concord University, Grant (6 ft 10 in [2.08 m]) was affiliated with DII Mount Olive and Atlantic University Sport member CBU Capers.

== High school career ==
=== Freshman (2016–17) ===
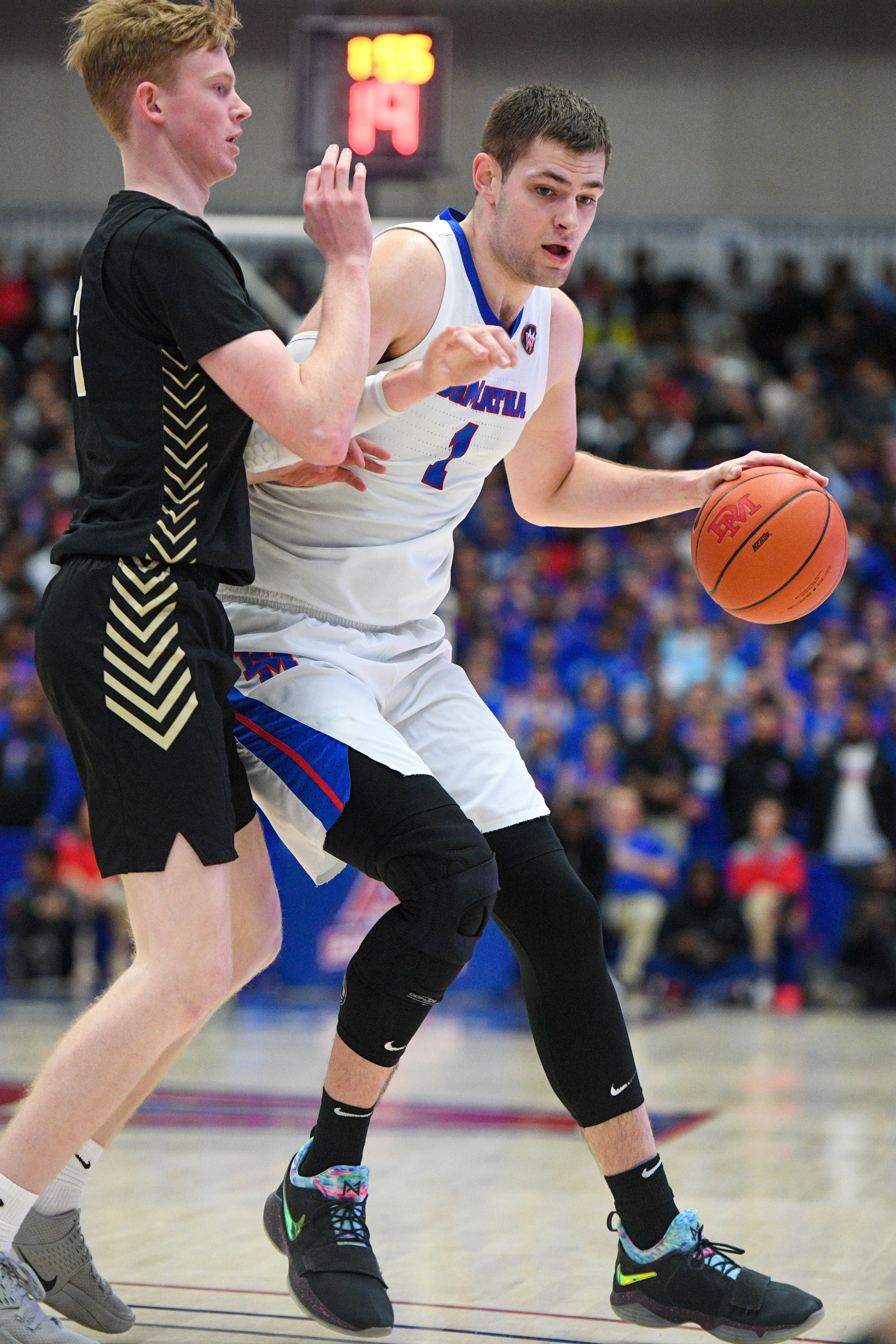
Dickinson (right) with DeMatha Catholic in 2020

Dickinson attended DeMatha Catholic High School in Hyattsville, Maryland. As an entering freshman in 2016, the highly regarded Dickinson stood at 6 ft 11 in (2.11 m) and joined a lineup that included Josh Carlton. By April 2017, he had offers from Penn State and Notre Dame as well as interest from many top programs. In June, he was ranked as the number nine prospect in the national class of 2020 (behind number one overall Isaiah Todd) by ESPN.

=== Sophomore (2017–18) ===
By December 2017, now a sophomore, Dickinson had grown to 7 ft 1 in (2.16 m). On February 26, 2018, he helped his team capture its first Washington Catholic Athletic Conference (WCAC) championship since 2011. A week later, on March 6, Dickinson earned MVP honors helping DeMatha win the Maryland private-school championship, scoring 31 points in the 64–58 victory over Rock Creek Christian Academy.

Towards the end of the season, Dickinson was named to the first-team All-WCAC alongside teammate Justin Moore. He was a third-team All-Met selection by The Washington Post, joining junior teammate Moore (first team) and fellow sophomore Earl Timberlake (fourth team). He was also considered (along with Jeremy Roach) one of the two best players in the DC metro area class of 2020, and was ranked 18th in the nation by USA Today.

=== Junior (2018–19) ===
The class of 2020 was the first junior class to benefit from expanded official visit rules (expanding from five total official college visits to five each as a high school junior and senior, and another five as a collegiate transfer). Dickinson visited Purdue in September 2018. As a junior, he was ranked as the number four center in the national class of 2020 by 247Sports, but regarded as more of a versatile center with the ability to stretch the court, making him better suited to high-level competition than centers like DC metro rival Qudus Wahab, who focused on the traditional key/low post inside game skill set for a basketball big man. Although DeMatha was knocked out of the WCAC tournament before the finals by St. John's College High School, they repeated as Maryland private-school champions. Dickinson led the team to three consecutive double-digit victories. He earned tournament MVP and posted 20 points in the 85–53 championship-game victory over Rock Creek. In his junior season, Dickinson averaged 17.6 points, 10.8 rebounds and 2.5 blocks per game. Dickinson repeated as a third-team All-Met selection by The Washington Post, joining senior teammate Moore (first team, player of the year), fellow junior Timberlake (second team) and senior Jahmir Young (honorable mention).

=== National team (2019) ===
In April 2019, Dickinson was one of 55 athletes invited to compete for a position on the 12-man United States men's national under-19 basketball team to participate in the 2019 FIBA Under-19 Basketball World Cup. That June, he was one of 31 players in Colorado Springs during the camp and selection process. When the roster was trimmed to 18 finalists and the subsequent 12-man Team USA, Dickinson was not included.

=== Senior (2019–20) ===
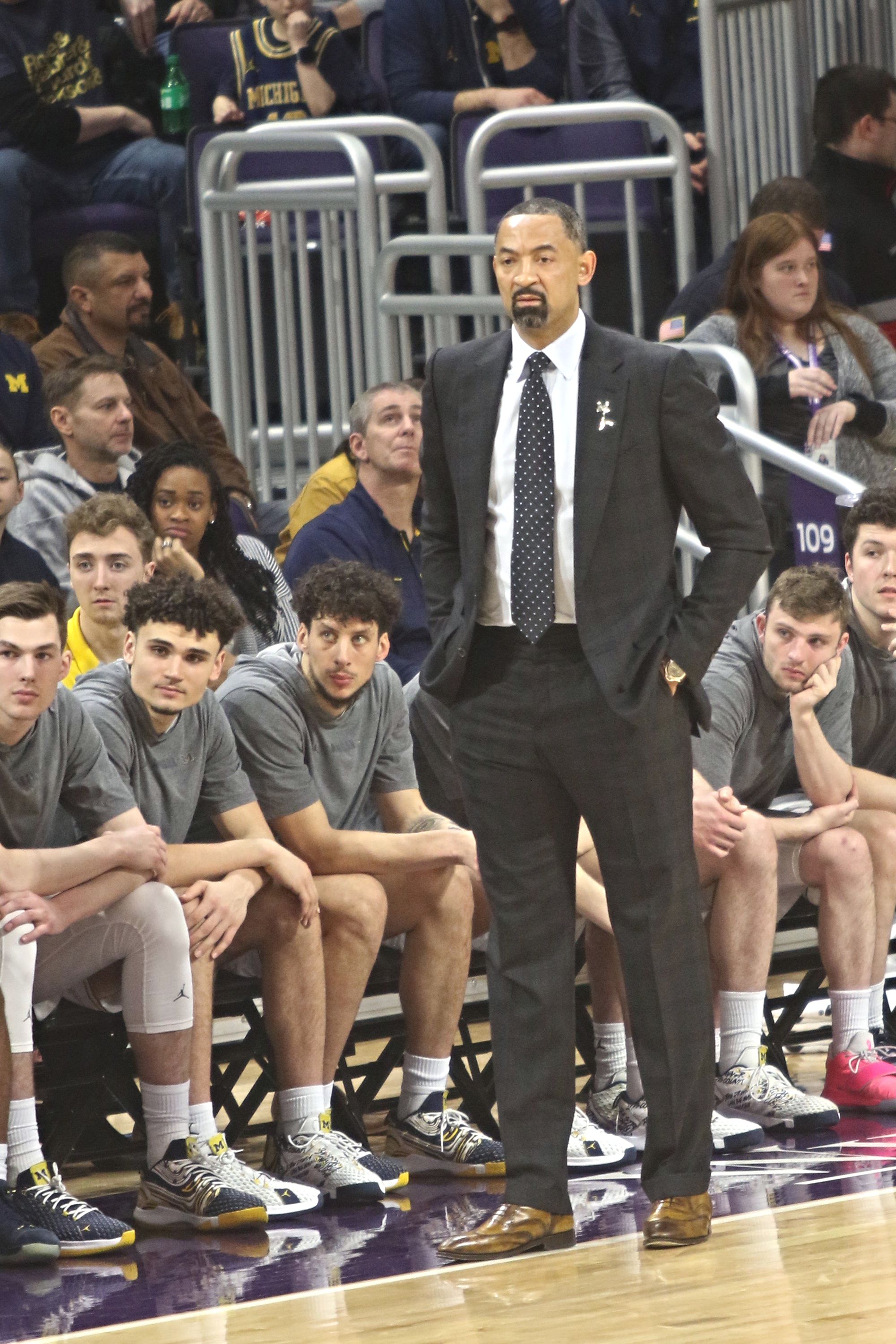
Juwan Howard 2 months after meeting with Dickinson for his verbal commitment.

Dickinson updated his list of college programs he was considering to Duke, Florida State, Michigan and Notre Dame in October 2019, at which time he was ranked 34th by 247 Sports. Dickinson verbally committed Michigan in early December by calling private a meeting with head coach Juwan Howard and assistant coach Phil Martelli on a day when they were in town to scout him at a tournament at DeMatha's home court. Dickinson told Howard that he felt Howard was the best coach to develop Dickinson's game. This was revealed in the press in 2023. He publicly announced his verbal commitment to Michigan with a video posted to Twitter on December 20, at which point he was still ranked 34th overall, and sixth among centers. Todd was among the other verbal commits to Michigan. On January 1, 2020, Dickinson's AAU teammate Terrance Williams (84th overall, 17th power forward) also verbally committed to Michigan.

By late January 2020, Dickinson was ranked 37th (behind Timberlake at 31). On January 21, however, he had the chance to go head-to-head against number-one-ranked Evan Mobley while playing Rancho Christian at the Hoophall Classic. Dickinson outscored Mobley 28–22 and led DeMatha to a 72–65 victory. On February 11, 2020, he recorded 40 points, nine rebounds and three blocks in a 71–63 win over St. John's College High School. Dickinson and Timberlake led DeMatha to a 70–56 WCAC championship-game victory over the Roach-led Paul VI Catholic High School. Dickinson earned 2020 All-Met Player of the Year and WCAC Player of the Year honors, and graduated as a three-time first-team All-WCAC selection. He was joined on the All-Met first team by Roach, Timberlake, Corey Dyches, Trevor Keels, Benny Williams, Avery Ford, Xavier Lipscomb, Ronald Polite and future teammate Terrance Williams. He was named Maryland Gatorade Player of the Year for his success in basketball and academics, and his exemplary character. Dickinson was invited to play in the 2020 Jordan Brand Classic, which was cancelled due to the Coronavirus. Despite not making a three-pointer in November and December 2019, Dickinson shot 40 percent from three-point range during his senior year. As a senior, Dickinson averaged 18.1 points, 10.3 rebounds, 3.8 assists and 2.1 blocks per game, leading his team to a WCAC title.

=== Recruiting ===
Dickinson had been one of the key class of 2020 targets (along with Jabri Abdur-Rahim) for Michigan head coach John Beilein's staff when Beilein announced he would be departing to coach the Cleveland Cavaliers in May 2019. Juwan Howard was named Michigan head coach on May 22 and made an offer to Dickinson on June 26. The Detroit Free Press reported that Dickinson said Michigan was the most aggressive pursuer of his talents. In July, Dickinson listed the top seven schools he was considering: Purdue, Florida State, Louisville, Michigan, North Carolina, Notre Dame and Providence. By August 2019, Dickinson was ranked 30th in the national class of 2020 by 247Sports. Dickinson was a consensus four-star recruit and ranked as the second-best player from Maryland in the 2020 class (behind Timberlake). On December 20, 2019, he committed to playing college basketball for Michigan over offers from Duke, Florida State and Notre Dame. He said he was drawn by his relationship with Howard, and Michigan's strength and conditioning program.

He joined a Michigan frontline that was expected to return sophomore Colin Castleton and fifth-year Austin Davis (2016 Mr. Basketball of Michigan runner-up). On April 9, however, Castleton (who had lost the role as Jon Teske's backup to Davis) entered the transfer portal, and committed to Florida on April 26. By April 17, when Dickinson signed his National Letter of Intent with Michigan, he was ranked 32nd overall and sixth at the center position, according to 247Sports.

College recruiting
Name	Hometown	School	Height	Weight	Commit date
Hunter Dickinson; C	Alexandria, VA	DeMatha Catholic (MD)	7 ft 1 in (2.16 m)	260 lb (120 kg)	Dec 20, 2019
Hunter Dickinson; C	Recruit ratings: Rivals: 247Sports: ESPN: (87)				
Overall recruit ranking: Rivals: 40 247Sports: 50 ESPN: 41
Note: In many cases, Scout, Rivals, 247Sports, On3, and ESPN may conflict in their listings of height and weight.; In these cases, the average was taken. ESPN grades are on a 100-point scale.; Sources: "Michigan 2020 Basketball Commitments". Rivals.; "2020 Michigan Wolverines Recruiting Class". ESPN.; "2020 Team Ranking". Rivals.

== College career ==
=== Michigan ===
==== Freshman season ====
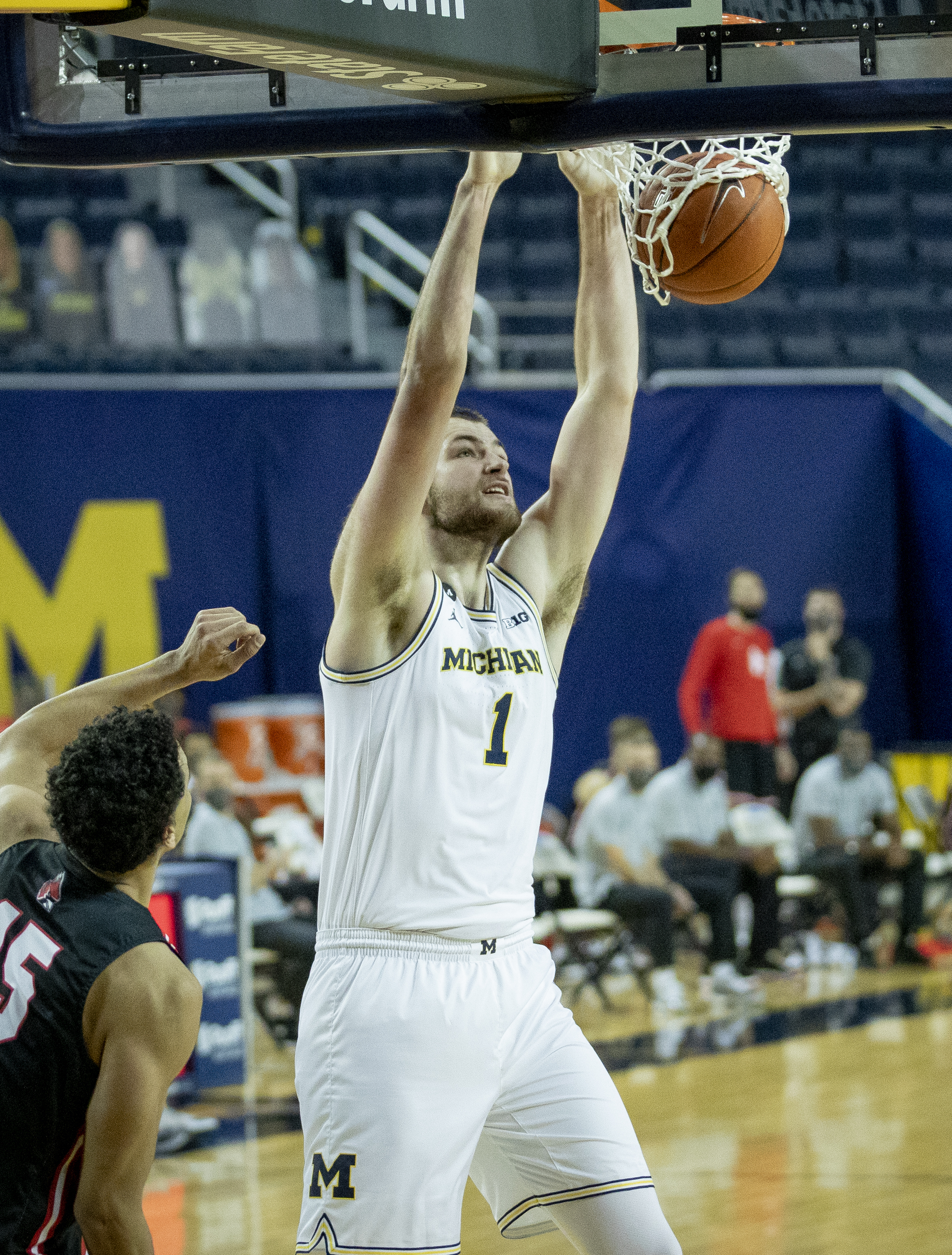
Dickinson with Michigan in 2020

Dickinson debuted for Michigan on November 25, 2020, scoring 11 points and collecting eight rebounds in a 96–82 win against Bowling Green. Dickinson averaged 13.0 points, 9.0 rebounds and one block per game and shot 73.3 percent from the floor (11-for-15) in wins over Ball State and Central Florida. He also recorded his first career double-double with 12 points and a career-high 11 rebounds in the Wolverines' 84–65 win against Ball State. This performance led to him being named the Big Ten Freshman of the Week for the week ending December 6. He then received the honor for a second consecutive week, this time for the week ending December 13, after he averaged 19.0 points, 7.0 rebounds and 3.5 blocked shots per game in wins over Toledo and Penn State. On December 25, Dickinson recorded 13 points and a career-high 15 rebounds, for his second career double-double, in an 80–69 victory against Nebraska. He was subsequently named the Big Ten Freshman of the Week for the week ending December 27. On December 31, Dickinson recorded a career-high 26 points and 11 rebounds, for his third career double-double in an 84–73 victory against Maryland. Dickinson averaged 22.5 points and 7.0 rebounds in wins over Maryland and No. 19/No. 22 Northwestern to help the Wolverines improve to 9–0 on the season. He finished the week shooting 18-for-23 from the field (.782 pct.) and 9-of-12 from the foul line (.750 pct.) for an overall shooting percentage of 78, and was named the Big Ten Freshman of the Week for the week ending January 3, 2021, his fourth such accolade. He followed this up with a 28-point performance on January 6 against Minnesota. By the time of his fifth Big Ten Freshman of the Week award on January 11 for the week ending January 10, Michigan had a 10–0 record and Dickinson ranked first among all power conferences players with a .730 field goal percentage and third among all NCAA men's freshman with 18.0 points per game.

After winning 5 of the first 7 awards, Dickinson did not win Freshman of the Week again until February 15 when he posted 11 points, 15 rebounds and 5 blocks against No. 21/No. 21 Wisconsin on February 14, which was Michigan's first 10-plus-point/15-plus-rebound/5-plus-block game since Courtney Sims on February 7, 2004 over 17 years earlier for the 2003–04 Wolverines. The following week Dickinson averaged 16.0 points, 8.5 rebounds and 1.5 blocks per game as Michigan defeated Rutgers February 18, 2021 and then defeated No. 4/No. 4 Ohio State on February 21, 2021—Michigan's first rivalry win at Columbus in 7 years. Dickinson was again named Big Ten Freshman of the week; with seven such awards, he was second in conference history to Jared Sullinger (12, in 2010–11). On March 4, Dickinson recorded his fifth career double-double with 14 points and 10 rebounds in a 69–50 rivalry win against Michigan State; the win clinched the 2020–21 Big Ten regular season championship for the 2020–21 Wolverines. They earned a #1 seed in the 2021 NCAA Division I men's basketball tournament. They reached the Elite Eight, where they lost to #11 seed UCLA 51–49, ending their season. Dickinson scored in double digits in all four of Michigan's games in the tournament.

For the season, Dickinson led Michigan in scoring (14.1), rebounding (7.4), double-doubles (5) and double-digit-rebounding games (5). Dickinson was named first-team All-Big Ten by the media, second-team All-Big Ten by the coaches (along with Isaiah Livers and Wagner), a Big Ten All-Freshman honoree (along with Andre Curbelo, Keegan Murray, Zach Edey and Jaden Ivey) and the Big Ten Freshman of the Year. His All-Freshman recognition marked Michigan's third straight season with such an honoree, following Ignas Brazdeikis (2019) and Franz Wagner (2020); Michigan would eventually extend the streak to five, with Moussa Diabaté and Jett Howard coming after Dickinson. He was also named a consensus second-team All-American, becoming Michigan's first consensus All-American since Nik Stauskas in 2014 and 13th all time. Dickinson declared himself eligible for the 2021 NBA draft on May 26. As of June 14, he was not projected to be drafted. As the July 7 deadline approached, he was not listed above the mid-second round by anyone, and on July 6, he declared his intent to return to Michigan.

==== Sophomore season ====
Dickinson and incoming freshman Caleb Houstan were named Preseason All-Big Ten honorees, marking the third time in school history that Michigan had two such selectees (Juwan Howard/Jalen Rose (1993–94) and Mitch McGary/Glenn Robinson III (2013–14)). Dickinson was one of five unanimous Preseason All-Big Ten selections, joining Conference Preseason Player of the Year Kofi Cockburn, Trayce Jackson-Davis, E.J. Liddell and Jaden Ivey. As a sophomore, Dickinson earned Big Ten Conference Player of the Week for the week ending January 23, 2022 for his play against Maryland and Indiana when he averaged 23.0 points, 7.5 rebounds, 5.0 points, 1.0 steal and 1.0 block. He posted a career-high 33 points in the rivalry game against Michigan State for interim coach Phil Martelli in an 87–70 victory on March 1. Following the regular season, Dickinson was named to the second-team All-Big Ten by both the coaches and the media as well as the All-Defensive Team.

During the 2022 NCAA tournament Michigan received an at-large bid as the #11 seed in the South Region. On March 17, Michigan defeated #6 seed (No. 24 AP Poll) Colorado State 75–63 behind Dickinson's game-high 21 points, 6 rebounds and 4 blocks. On March 19, Michigan defeated #3 seed (No. 5 /No. 8) Tennessee 76–68 in the second round. Michigan was led by Dickinson with 27 points, including 3-of-5 on three-point field goals, 11 rebounds, 4 assists, a block and a steal. With the win, the Wolverines advanced to the Sweet Sixteen for the fifth consecutive tournament. On March 24, Michigan lost to (No. 6/No. 5) Villanova 55–63 in the Sweet Sixteen despite 15 points, 15 rebounds, 3 assists and 2 blocks from Dickinson.

Dickinson earned Academic All-Big Ten Team recognition as well as CoSIDA Academic All-District recognition for his 3.32 GPA, making him one of three Big Ten basketball players among the 40 finalists for the 15-man Academic All-America team. For the season, Dickinson averaged 18.6 points, 8.6 rebounds and 2.3 assists, repeating as the team leader in scoring and rebounding, He became the fourth Wolverine to lead the team in both of those categories multiple times. Following the first season after NCAA v. Alston enabled college and pre-college athletes to earn significant student athlete compensation, known as name, image and likeness compensation (NIL), without losing athletic scholarship eligibility, he announced he would return for another season in April. Dickinson had 8 to 10 partnership arrangements before the basketball season started in 2021, and stated that the NIL deals contributed to his return.

==== Junior season ====
Dickinson entered the season as one of three unanimous Preseason All-Big Ten selection (along with Preseason Conference Player of the Year Jackson-Davis and Zach Edey). On November 8, 2022, in a 75–56 victory over Purdue Fort Wayne, Dickinson recorded a game-high 22 points and 12 rebounds, for his 18th career double-double. Dickinson reached 1,000 career points on a free throw with 3:43 remaining in the first half, becoming the 57th Wolverine to reach the milestone. That week, he earned Big Ten Player of the Week, averaging 26.5 points, 9.5 rebounds and 1.5 blocked shots. On November 16, in a 91–60 victory over Pittsburgh in the semifinals of the Legends Classic, Dickinson recorded 11 points and seven rebounds. This made Dickinson the 46th Wolverine to reach the 500-rebound milestone, and the 31st member of Michigan's 1,000-point/500-rebound club. On January 1, 2023, Dickinson posted his third career 30-point game with a 32-point/12-rebound effort against Maryland, which contributed to him being named Big Ten Player of the Week on January 3. On February 26, Dickinson scored a buzzer-beating three-point shot to force overtime in an 87–79 victory over Wisconsin. On March 2, Dickinson scored 31 points and a career high 16 rebounds in an 87–91 double-overtime loss to Illinois; he ended the game with 1,529 career points, becoming the 22nd Wolverine to reach the 1,500-point milestone, and surpassing head coach Juwan Howard (1,526) for 20th on Michigan's all-time scoring list. On March 5, Dickinson scored 24 points and 14 rebounds in a 73–75 overtime loss to Indiana. In doing so, he became the ninth Wolverine to surpass the 750-rebound mark, and the sixth have also scored 1,500 points.

Following the regular season, Dickinson earned All-Big Ten first-team recognition from the media and second-team recognition from the coaches, along with Michigan's third-team selections Kobe Bufkin and Jett Howard. He was an Associated Press honorable mention 2023 NCAA Men's Basketball All-Americans. On March 18, during the second round of the 2023 National Invitation Tournament, Dickinson recorded 21 points and 11 rebounds, for his 31st career double-double, tied with Loy Vaught for sixth most all time in Michigan program history. Dickinson repeated as an Academic All-Big Ten Team selectee; eligibility had been revamped in 2022 by the renamed College Sports Communicators, requiring a 3.5 GPA (previously 3.3). For the season, Dickinson averaged 18.5 points, 9.0 rebounds and 1.8 blocks. For his 94-game Michigan career, he averaged 17.2 points, 8.4 rebounds and 1.6 blocks and shot 57% from the field. Dickinson led the team in scoring and rebounding for a third season.

On March 31, Dickinson announced he was entering the NCAA transfer portal. His stated intention at the time was to graduate from Michigan following the Summer 2023 semester. Dickinson's departure would make way for returning sophomore Tarris Reed to play more frequently. Playing time, however, was not believed to be the reason for Dickinson's departure. Michigan's failure to make the 2023 NCAA Division I men's basketball tournament, and its dim championship prospects, was one speculated reason. Another was the likelihood that he could procure a superior NIL package, despite his endorsements with Lowe's, Ritz Crackers and Outback Steakhouse. In a May 2023 episode of a podcast he co-hosts with Barstool Sports' Marty Mush and Jordan Bohannon, Dickinson said that he made less than $100,000 ($110,020 in 2025 assuming deals were negotiated in 2022 dollars) for the 2022–23 NCAA basketball season and that the Wolverines were unwilling to guarantee him an acceptable higher number. The college-sports website On3.com estimated that Dickinson's 2022–23 market value was $868,000 ($954,960 in 2025) in endorsements, along with a $1,700 ($1,870 in 2025) fee per social-media post. The 2022–23 National Basketball Association (NBA) two-way contract value was $502,000 ($552,290 in 2025), which was half of the rookie minimum salary, $1.004 million ($1.1 million in 2025).

Dickinson was regarded as the top-rated men's basketball player (ahead of Max Abmas and Kel'el Ware) in the portal in 2023. He had offers from many schools, including Kansas, Villanova, Kentucky, Maryland and Georgetown. His high school coach, Mike Jones, had become an assistant coach at Maryland. Dickinson took unofficial visits to his hometown programs Maryland and Georgetown, both of which had changed head coaches since his high school recruitment. He described the visits as having been "spur-of-the-moment" since he was going home and deciding about transferring. He then visited Kansas, in addition to Kentucky and Villanova, before making his final decision to leave Michigan on May 3.

=== Kansas ===
==== Senior season ====
Dickinson committed to Kansas on May 4, 2023. The 2023–24 Jayhawks began the season as the number-one-ranked team in the country. Dickinson was the first player to be named both the Big 12 Conference Preseason Player of the Year and Preseason Newcomer of the Year. He was also named to the Associated Press preseason All-American team. Dickinson got off to a fast start at Kansas, earning Big 12 Newcomer of the week on November 13, for averaging 19.5 points and 8.0 rebounds in his first two games. On November 14, 2023, Dickinson took advantage of a Kentucky Wildcats lineup that was without 7 foot (2.1 metres) big men Aaron Bradshaw, Ugonna Onyenso and Zvonimir Ivišić. He posted 27 points and 21 rebounds. He was the first Big 12 Player to accumulate 25-plus points and 20-plus rebounds in a game against a ranked opponent since Blake Griffin on November 18, 2008 for Oklahoma vs. No. 21 Davidson, and the first Kansas player with such a game since Thomas Robinson on December 31, 2011 for the 2011–12 Jayhawks against North Dakota. The performance earned him both Big 12 Player of the Week and Big 12 Newcomer of the week recognition as well as Oscar Robertson National Player of the Week selection from the United States Basketball Writers Association (USBWA).

In Kansas' January 8, 2024, start to conference play against TCU, Dickinson posted 30 points and 11 rebounds, including game-tying free throws with 57 seconds left and the game-winning basket with 3.4 seconds left. The game marked his 40th career double-double and stretched his double-digit-rebound streak to a career-high six games. On February 5, Dickinson earned a third Big 12 Player of the Week award, when he collected his 2,000th point as he helped Kansas defeat Oklahoma State and No. 4 Houston with averages of 18 points, 9.5 rebounds and 3 assists for the week. He became the third active player with 1,000 career rebounds and 2,000 career points, and again earned Player of the Week recognition from the USBWA. Dickinson finished the season as the conference's leading rebounder (10.84 overall, 9.61 in conference games), its leading scorer in conference games (17.56), and its second-leading scorer overall (17.97). He earned Big 12 Newcomer of the Year, and All-Big 12 first-team recognition. Dickinson was a consensus second-team All-American selection, becoming the 17th consensus All-American for Bill Self as coach at Kansas, and marking the school's third consecutive season with such a recognition (Ochai Agbaji in 2022 and Jalen Wilson in 2023). He was the first men's basketball player to earn consensus All-American recognition at two different schools. Kansas entered the 2024 NCAA Division I men's basketball tournament with a #4 seed. In the first round, they defeated Samford behind 19 points and 20 rebounds from Dickinson. They were eliminated in the second round by #5 seed Gonzaga despite 15 points by Dickinson.

On April 26, Dickinson announced that he would return to Kansas for a final season. Although Kansas was not the school that had offered him the highest NIL compensation package during his transfer recruitement, his 2023–24 earnings were estimated at $586,000 (including Wendy's and Adidas sponsorships as well as a University of Kansas affiliate collective) according to a Fansided report.

==== Fifth-year season ====
Dickinson, like all spring-sport student-athletes, was provided an additional year of athletic eligibility by the NCAA Division I Council in place of the 2020–21 NCAA Division I men's basketball season. The 2024–25 Jayhawks were again the preseason number-one-ranked team in the country, marking the fifth time in school history that the team began the season so ranked. Dickinson repeated as Big 12 Preseason Player of the Year, and as an Associated Press preseason All-American, with ESPN naming him the fourth-highest-rated player in college basketball in the preseason.

Dickinson had several great performances in his fifth year. He again opened the season as Big 12 Player of the week, with a 20-point/10-rebound effort, including the final three points of the game, in a 92–89 victory over ninth-ranked North Carolina on November 8, 2024. Four days later, he posted his 50th career double-double with 28 points and 12 rebounds in a Champions Classic victory over Michigan State; the performance helped lead to a back-to-back Big 12 Player of the Week recognition on November 18. On November 26, Dickinson was ejected from a game against Duke after kicking Maliq Brown in the face. On December 14, Dickinson posted 21 points, 14 rebounds, a career-high 8 assists and 0 turnovers in a 75–60 victory over NC State. No Division I player had posted those three stats without turnovers since at least the 1996–97 NCAA basketball season. Dickinson also had two steals and a blocked shot in the game. The effort earned him another Big 12 Player of the Week selection. In a February 24, 2025, victory against Colorado, Dickinson posted 32 points on 13-for-18 shooting to establish a personal best as a Jayhawk. In the March 8 regular-season finale, Dickinson matched his career high with 33 points in an 83–76 victory against 24th-ranked Arizona, recording his fifth double-double in the final six regular-season games.

Dickinson earned first-team All-Big 12 recognition at the end of the regular season as he stood fourth in the conference in scoring (17.4) and second in rebounding (9.9). After the 2025 Big 12 men's basketball tournament, Dickinson earned 2025 third-team All-American recognition from the Associated Press and United States Basketball Writers Association. In addition to recognition from official selectors, Dickinson was a third-team All-American choice by Bleacher Report. Dickinson finished his career with 11 points and 9 rebounds when #7 seed Kansas' season ended in the first round of the 2025 NCAA Division I men's basketball tournament against #10 seed Arkansas.

== Professional career ==
The NBA draft combine list is determined by a vote of NBA teams. Dickinson was neither invited to the 2025 NBA draft combine nor selected for the 2025 NBA G League Elite Camp for a chance to earn support for a combine invitation. Dickinson poked fun at his low draft prospects, appearing in an ad for LinkedIn. He did ultimately work out for a handful of NBA teams, including the Pelicans.

Dickinson went undrafted in the 2025 NBA draft, held on June 25–26. On June 27, Dickinson signed a two-way contract with the New Orleans Pelicans. Although official contract terms were not announced, it was speculated that the standard terms of the 2025–26 NBA two-way contract salary was $636,000 and that the salary would be guaranteed through the conclusion of the season on January 7, 2026. The signing also put Dickinson on the Pelicans' NBA Summer League roster. Dickinson's Summer League play had mixed reviews with praise for his blocked shots and criticism of his general speed, especially footspeed. In the 2025 NBA Summer League, Dickinson averaged 6.3 points, 3.5 rebounds 2.5 assists and 17.5 minutes, across 4 games (including 2 starts). He was 0-for-4 on three-point shots and 11-for-15 on the rest of his shots. Criticism of Dickinson's speed continued through the NBA preseason.

Dickinson found himself battling Karlo Matković for NBA playing time behind Kevon Looney. Both were injured prior to the Pelicans' October 22 opener against the Memphis Grizzlies, leaving Dickinson, Yves Missi and Derik Queen as options at center. Missi was injured during the game, and Dickinson debuted and scored his first basket. On October 24, the Pelicans signed veteran center DeAndre Jordan. On November 7, Dickinson made his NBA G League debut with an 11-point, 10-rebound, 5-assist effort in the season opener for the Birmingham Squadron against the Austin Spurs. Dickinson was selected to the 2026 NBA G League Next Up Game after averaging 16.6 points, 10.1 rebounds, 3.3 assists. 1.2 blocks and 1.1 steals through 19 regular-season games with seven double-doubles, including the franchise's first 20=-point, 20-rebound game: a 23-point/24-rebound (the latter a franchise record) performance at Delaware on January 4, 2026. On March 17, while playing for Birmingham, Dickinson recorded career highs in points (34) and rebounds (27) in a 122–106 victory over the Maine Celtics.

On July 2, it was announced that Dickinson would be participating in the 2026 NBA Summer League. July 4, he re-signed with New Orleans on a two-way contract. On August 18, the Pelicans waived Dickinson, clearing roster space for two-way signee Malik Dia. The Pelicans re-signed Dickinson on October 15, 2026. He was assigned to the Laketown Squadron.

== Career statistics ==
Legend
GP	Games played	GS	Games started	MPG	Minutes per game
FG%	Field goal percentage	3P%	3-point field goal percentage	FT%	Free throw percentage
RPG	Rebounds per game	APG	Assists per game	SPG	Steals per game
BPG	Blocks per game	PPG	Points per game	**Bold**	Career high

=== NBA ===
Year	Team	GP	GS	MPG	FG%	3P%	FT%	RPG	APG	SPG	BPG	PPG
2025–26	New Orleans	5	0	8.4	.357	.000	1.000	1.0	.4	.2	.4	2.4
Career		5	0	8.4	.357	.000	1.000	1.0	.4	.2	.4	2.4

=== College ===
Year	Team	GP	GS	MPG	FG%	3P%	FT%	RPG	APG	SPG	BPG	PPG
2020–21	Michigan	28	23	26.0	**.598**	.000	.739	7.4	.9	.3	1.4	14.1
2021–22	Michigan	32	32	32.3	.563	.328	**.802**	8.6	**2.3**	.5	1.5	**18.6**
2022–23	Michigan	**34**	**34**	**32.7**	.560	**.421**	.727	9.0	1.5	.5	**1.8**	18.5
2023–24	Kansas	33	33	32.2	.548	.354	.624	**10.9**	**2.3**	.9	1.4	17.9
2024–25	Kansas	**34**	**34**	30.1	.526	.276	.748	10.0	2.1	**1.0**	1.3	17.4
Career		161	156	30.8	.555	.339	.729	9.2	1.8	.7	1.5	17.4

== See also ==
- List of NCAA Division I men's basketball players with 2,000 points and 1,000 rebounds
- List of NCAA Division I men's basketball career scoring leaders
- List of NCAA Division I men's basketball career rebounding leaders
- Michigan Wolverines men's basketball statistical leaders
- Kansas Jayhawks men's basketball statistical leaders
