= 2020–21 Big Ten Conference men's basketball season =

- League: NCAA Division I
- Sport: Basketball
- Teams: 14
- TV partner(s): Big Ten Network, ESPN, Fox, FS1, CBS

2020–21 NCAA Division I men's basketball season
- Regular season champions: Michigan
- Season MVP: Luka Garza, Iowa
- Top scorer: Luka Garza, Iowa

Tournament
- Venue: Lucas Oil Stadium, Indianapolis, Indiana (Note: The tournament was originally planned to be held at the United Center in Chicago, Illinois.)
- Champions: Illinois
- Runners-up: Ohio State
- Finals MVP: Ayo Dosunmu

Basketball seasons
- 2019–20 2021–22

2020–21 Big Ten Conference men's basketball standings
	Conf.				Overall
Team	W		L	PCT	W		L	PCT
No. 4 Michigan	14	–	3	.824	23	–	5	.821
No. 2 Illinois †	16	–	4	.800	24	–	7	.774
No. 8 Iowa	14	–	6	.700	22	–	9	.710
No. 20 Purdue	13	–	6	.684	18	–	10	.643
No. 7 Ohio State	12	–	8	.600	21	–	10	.677
Wisconsin	10	–	10	.500	18	–	13	.581
Rutgers	10	–	10	.500	16	–	12	.571
Maryland	9	–	11	.450	17	–	14	.548
Michigan State	9	–	11	.450	15	–	13	.536
Indiana	7	–	12	.368	12	–	15	.444
Penn State	7	–	12	.368	11	–	14	.440
Northwestern	6	–	13	.316	9	–	15	.375
Minnesota	6	–	14	.300	14	–	15	.483
Nebraska	3	–	16	.158	7	–	20	.259
† Conference tournament winner Rankings from AP poll

The 2020–21 Big Ten men's basketball season began with practices in October 2020, followed by the start of the 2020–21 NCAA Division I men's basketball season in November 2020. The regular season ended in March 2021.

The Big Ten announced the season schedule on November 18, 2020 with games starting on December 13 and featuring games played on December 25 and 26. The schedule had built-in collapsible byes to attempt to make up for expected COVID-19 issues. The conference played the highest percentage of scheduled conference games in the nation, having only four games that could not be played.

With a win over rival Michigan State on March 4, 2021, Michigan won the Big Ten regular season championship based on winning percentage as the Wolverines did not play a full 20-game schedule due to COVID-19 issues.

The Big Ten tournament was originally to be held at the United Center in Chicago, Illinois from March 10–14, 2021. However, on February 9, the conference announced the tournament would be played at Lucas Oil Stadium in Indianapolis, Indiana to better deal with testing concerns raised by the ongoing COVID-19 pandemic. Illinois defeated Ohio State in the championship game to win the Big Ten tournament and receive the conference's automatic bid to the NCAA tournament.

Iowa big man Luka Garza was named Big Ten Player of the Year for the second consecutive year. Michigan coach Juwan Howard was named Big Ten Coach of the Year. Garza and Illinois point guard Ayo Dosunmu were consensus first-team All-Americans.

In addition to Illinois, Iowa, Maryland, Michigan, Michigan State, Ohio State, Purdue, Rutgers, and Wisconsin received bids to the NCAA tournament. The nine bids to the tournament marked a conference record.

== Head coaches ==
=== Coaching changes ===
==== Penn State ====
On October 21, 2020, Pat Chambers resigned after an internal investigation by the school into inappropriate conduct by Chambers. It had been reported in July that former player Rasir Bolton had left the program due to comments to him by Chambers. New allegations involving Chambers surfaced after the school's investigation. Assistant coach Jim Ferry served as interim coach for the 2020–21 season.

=== Coaches ===
Team	Head coach	Previous job	Years at school	Overall record	Big Ten record	Big Ten titles	Big Ten tournament titles	NCAA tournaments	NCAA Final Fours	NCAA Championships
Illinois	Brad Underwood	Oklahoma State	4	47–49	24–34	0	0	0	0	0
Indiana	Archie Miller	Dayton	4	55–43	28–32	0	0	0	0	0
Iowa	Fran McCaffery	Siena	11	196–143	89–95	0	0	4	0	0
Maryland	Mark Turgeon	Texas A&M	10	204–99	76–43*	1	0	4	0	0
Michigan	Juwan Howard	Miami Heat (Asst.)	2	19–12	10–10	0	0	0	0	0
Michigan State	Tom Izzo	Michigan State (Asst.)	26	628–241	299–132	10	6	22	8	1
Minnesota	Richard Pitino	FIU	8	127–108	48–82	0	0	2	0	0
Nebraska	Fred Hoiberg	Chicago Bulls	2	7–25	2–18	0	0	0	0	0
Northwestern	Chris Collins	Duke (Asst.)	8	109–119	43–85	0	0	1	0	0
Ohio State	Chris Holtmann	Butler	4	66–29	34–24	0	0	2	0	0
Penn State	Jim Ferry (interim)	Penn State (Asst.)	1	0–0	0–0	0	0	0	0	0
Purdue	Matt Painter	Purdue (Assoc.)	16	337–174	167–103	3	1	11	0	0
Rutgers	Steve Pikiell	Stony Brook	5	64–65	24–32	0	0	0	0	0
Wisconsin	Greg Gard	Wisconsin (Assoc.)	6	101–57	56–35	1	0	3	0	0

Notes:

- All records, appearances, titles, etc. are from time with current school only.
- Year at school includes 2020–21 season.
- Overall and Big Ten records are from time at current school and are through the beginning of the season.
- Turgeon's ACC conference record excluded since Maryland began Big Ten Conference play in 2014–15.

== Preseason ==
=== Preseason All-Big Ten ===
On November 8, 2020, a panel of conference media selected a 10-member preseason All-Big Ten Team and Player of the Year.

Honor	Recipient
Preseason Player of the Year	Luka Garza*, Iowa
Preseason All-Big Ten Team	Kofi Cockburn, Illinois
Preseason All-Big Ten Team	Ayo Dosunmu*, Illinois
Preseason All-Big Ten Team	Luka Garza*, Iowa
Preseason All-Big Ten Team	Trayce Jackson-Davis, Indiana
Preseason All-Big Ten Team	Joe Wieskamp, Iowa
Preseason All-Big Ten Team	Aaron Henry, Michigan State
Preseason All-Big Ten Team	Marcus Carr, Minnesota
Preseason All-Big Ten Team	Trevion Williams, Purdue
Preseason All-Big Ten Team	Geo Baker, Rutgers
Preseason All-Big Ten Team	Nate Reuvers, Wisconsin
*Unanimous selections

=== Preseason national polls ===
	AP	Athlon; Sports	Blue Ribbon; Yearbook	CBS Sports	Coaches	ESPN	Lindy's; Sports	Sports; Illustrated
Illinois	8	9	11	4	10	8	12	4
Indiana				25				
Iowa	4	7	8	9	6	6	10	6
Maryland								
Michigan	25	17						
Michigan State	13	13	19	13	12	13	20	14
Minnesota								
Nebraska								
Northwestern								
Ohio State	23		21	23	24	24	22	21
Penn State								
Purdue								
Rutgers	24	19		24	23			
Wisconsin	7	6	7	8	7	7	6	16

== Regular season ==
=== 2020 ACC–Big Ten Challenge (Big Ten 7–5) ===
Date	Time	ACC team	B1G team	Score	Location	Television	Attendance	Challenge leader
Dec 8	5:00 p.m.	**Miami**	Purdue	58–54	Watsco Center • Coral Gables, Florida	ESPN2	0	ACC 1–0
Dec 8	7:00 p.m.	Boston College	**Minnesota**	80–85^{OT}	Williams Arena • Minneapolis, Minnesota	ESPNU	0	Tied 1–1
Dec 8	7:30 p.m.	No. 16 North Carolina	No. 3 **Iowa**	80–93	Carver–Hawkeye Arena • Iowa City, Iowa	ESPN	583	B1G 2–1
Dec 8	7:30 p.m.	Notre Dame	No. 22 **Ohio State**	85–90	Edmund P. Joyce Center • South Bend, Indiana	ESPN2	156	B1G 3–1
Dec 8	9:00 p.m.	No. 15 Virginia Tech	**Penn State**	55–75	Cassell Coliseum • Blacksburg, Virginia	ESPNU	250	B1G 4–1
Dec 8	9:30 p.m.	No. 10 Duke	No. 6 **Illinois**	68–83	Cameron Indoor Stadium • Durham, North Carolina	ESPN	0	B1G 5–1
Dec 8	9:30 p.m.	Syracuse	No. 21 **Rutgers**	69–79	Rutgers Athletic Center • Piscataway, New Jersey	ESPN2	0	B1G 6–1
Dec 9	5:00 p.m.	**Clemson**	Maryland	67–51	Littlejohn Coliseum • Clemson, South Carolina	ESPN2	1,876	B1G 6–2
Dec 9	~~7:15 p.m.~~	~~NC State~~	~~Michigan~~	Canceled	~~Crisler Center • Ann Arbor, Michigan~~	Canceled	Canceled	Canceled
Dec 9	7:15 p.m.	**Georgia Tech**	Nebraska	75–64	Pinnacle Bank Arena • Lincoln, Nebraska	ESPNU	0	B1G 6–3
Dec 9	7:15 p.m.	No. 20 **Florida State**	Indiana	69–67^{OT}	Donald L. Tucker Civic Center • Tallahassee, Florida	ESPN	2,956	B1G 6–4
Dec 9	~~9:15 p.m.~~	~~No. 18 Virginia~~	~~No. 4 Michigan State~~	Canceled	~~John Paul Jones Arena • Charlottesville, Virginia~~	Canceled	Canceled	Canceled
Dec 9	9:15 p.m.	**Pittsburgh**	Northwestern	71–70	Welsh-Ryan Arena • Evanston, Illinois	ESPNU	0	B1G 6–5
Dec 19	12:00 p.m.	No. 23 Louisville	No. 12 **Wisconsin**	48–85	Kohl Center • Madison, Wisconsin	ESPN2	0	B1G 7–5
**Winners are in bold** Game times in EST; Wake Forest did not play due to the ACC having one more team than the B1G. The NC State/Michigan, and Virginia/Michigan State games were canceled due to positive COVID-19 tests for NC State, and Virginia. The Louisville/Wisconsin game was postponed due to COVID-19 issues at Louisville, but the game was eventually played on December 19.

=== 2020 Gavitt Tipoff Games (Cancelled) ===
Plans announced in May 2020 called for Butler, Creighton, Georgetown, Marquette, Providence, St. John's, Villanova, and Xavier to represent the Big East and Illinois, Indiana, Iowa, Maryland, Michigan State, Purdue, Rutgers, and Wisconsin the Big Ten in the 2020 Gavitt Tipoff Games, which were scheduled for November 16–20, 2020. After the NCAA delayed the start of the 2020–21 season from November 10 to November 25 due to the COVID-19 pandemic, however, the Big East and Big Ten jointly announced on October 28, 2020, that the 2020 Gavitt Tipoff Games were cancelled and the series would be on hiatus for a year. In their statement, the two conferences also announced their intention to resume the games during the 2021–22 season.

=== Rankings ===
Legend
	Improvement in ranking
	Drop in ranking
	Not ranked previous week
RV	Received votes but were not ranked in Top 25 of poll
(Italics)	Number of first place votes

		Pre/ Wk 1	Wk 2	Wk 3	Wk 4	Wk 5	Wk 6	Wk 7	Wk 8	Wk 9	Wk 10	Wk 11	Wk 12	Wk 13	Wk 14	Wk 15	Wk 16	Wk 17	Final
Illinois	AP	8	5	6	13	18	15	12	14	22	19	12	6	5	5	4	3	2	
Illinois	C	10	10	9	13	18	16	12	13	24	22	13	6	5	4	4	3	2	8
Indiana	AP	RV	RV	RV	RV	RV	RV	RV	RV										
Indiana	C	RV	RV		RV	RV													
Iowa	AP	4	3	3	3 (1)	4	10	5	5	4	7	8	15	11	9	5	5	8	
Iowa	C	6	6	3 (1)	3 (2)	5	11	7	8	4	7	8	16	14	12	8	6	8	13
Maryland	AP		RV	RV												RV			
Maryland	C	RV	RV		RV											RV			RV
Michigan	AP	25	RV	RV	25	19	16	10	7	7	4	4	3	3	3	2 (4)	4	4	
Michigan	C	RV	RV	RV	24	19	15	9	5	7	4	4	3	3	3 (1)	2 (1)	4	4	4
Michigan State	AP	13	8	4	4	12	17	23	RV	RV							RV		
Michigan State	C	12	12	4	4	11	18	RV	RV	RV	RV					RV	RV		
Minnesota	AP				RV	RV	21	16	23	17	21	RV	RV						
Minnesota	C					RV	24	17	19	17	20	RV	RV						
Nebraska	AP																		
Nebraska	C																		
Northwestern	AP						19	RV	RV										
Northwestern	C						22	RV											
Ohio State	AP	23	23	22	20	23	25	RV	21	15	13	7	4	4	4	7	9	7	
Ohio State	C	24	24	20	19	20	21	RV	RV	18	15	9	5	4	5	10	10	7	15
Penn State	AP																		
Penn State	C				RV														
Purdue	AP					RV				RV	RV	24	24	RV	RV	23	20	20	
Purdue	C	RV	RV			RV	RV				RV	RV	25	RV	RV	23	19	20	RV
Rutgers	AP	24	24	21	19	11	14	15	RV			RV	25	RV					
Rutgers	C	23	23	22	17	12	13	14	RV	RV		RV	RV	RV		RV			RV
Wisconsin	AP	7	4	13	12	9	6	8	9	10	14	19	21	21	23	25	RV	RV	
Wisconsin	C	7	7	13	12	9	7	10	9	10	13	20	21	21	24	RV	RV		RV

- AP does not release a post-tournament poll.

=== Player of the week ===
Throughout the conference regular season, the Big Ten offices named one or two players of the week and one or two freshmen of the week each Monday.

Week	Player of the week	Freshman of the week
November 30, 2020	Luka Garza, Iowa	Zach Edey, Purdue
November 30, 2020	Luka Garza, Iowa	Adam Miller, Illinois
December 7, 2020	Trayce Jackson-Davis, Indiana	Hunter Dickinson, Michigan
December 14, 2020	Ayo Dosunmu, Illinois	Hunter Dickinson (2), Michigan
December 14, 2020	Luka Garza (2), Iowa	Hunter Dickinson (2), Michigan
December 21, 2020	Boo Buie, Northwestern	Mason Gillis, Purdue
December 28, 2020	Marcus Carr, Minnesota	Hunter Dickinson (3), Michigan
December 28, 2020	Ayo Dosunmu (2), Illinois	Hunter Dickinson (3), Michigan
January 3, 2021	Liam Robbins, Minnesota	Hunter Dickinson (4), Michigan
January 11, 2021	Trayce Jackson-Davis (2), Indiana	Hunter Dickinson (5), Michigan
January 11, 2021	Jordan Bohannon, Iowa	Hunter Dickinson (5), Michigan
January 18, 2021	Liam Robbins (2), Minnesota	Brandon Newman, Purdue
January 18, 2021	Trevion Williams, Purdue	Brandon Newman, Purdue
January 25, 2021	Isaiah Livers, Michigan	Jaden Ivey, Purdue
February 1, 2021	Ayo Dosunmu (3), Illinois	Brandon Newman (2), Purdue
February 8, 2021	Ayo Dosunmu (4), Illinois	Jaden Ivey (2), Purdue
February 15, 2021	Joe Wieskamp, Iowa	Hunter Dickinson (6), Michigan
February 22, 2021	Luka Garza (3), Iowa	Hunter Dickinson (7), Michigan
February 22, 2021	Duane Washington Jr., Ohio State	Hunter Dickinson (7), Michigan
March 1, 2021	Geo Baker, Rutgers	André Curbelo, Illinois
March 8, 2021	Aaron Henry, Michigan State	Zach Edey (2), Purdue

=== Conference matrix ===
This table summarizes the head-to-head results between teams in conference play. Each team was scheduled to play 20 conference games, and at least one game against each opponent. However, due to COVID-19 pandemic protocols some games were cancelled, officially declared as "no contest".

	Illinois	Indiana	Iowa	Maryland	Michigan	Michigan St	Minnesota	Nebraska	Northwestern	Ohio St	Penn St	Purdue	Rutgers	Wisconsin
vs. Illinois	–	0−2	0–1	1−0	0−1	1−0	0−2	0−2	0−2	1–1	0–2	0–1	1–0	0–2
vs. Indiana	2–0	–	0−2	0−1	1−0	2−0	0−1	0−1	1−1	1–0	0−1	2–0	2–0	1–0
vs. Iowa	1–0	2−0	–	0−1	1−0	0−2	1–1	0−1	0−2	1–1	0−1	0–1	0–2	0–2
vs. Maryland	0–1	1−0	1−0	–	2−0	0−1	0−2	0−2	1−0	1–0	2−0	1–1	1–1	1–1
vs. Michigan	1–0	0−1	0−1	0−2	–	1−1	1−1	0−1	0−1	0–1	0−1	0–1	0–1	0–2
vs. Michigan St	0–1	0−2	2–0	1−0	1−1	–	1−0	0−2	1−0	1–1	0−1	2–0	1–1	1–0
vs. Minnesota	2–0	1−0	1−1	2−0	1−1	0−1	–	1−1	1−0	0–1	1−0	1–1	2–0	1–0
vs. Nebraska	2–0	1−0	1−0	2−0	1−0	2−0	1−1	–	1−0	1–0	1−1	1–0	0–1	2–0
vs. Northwestern	2–0	1−1	2−0	0−1	1−0	0−1	0−1	0−1	–	1–1	1−0	1–0	2–0	2–0
vs. Ohio State	1–1	0−1	1−1	0−1	1−0	1−1	1−0	0−1	1−1	–	0−2	2–0	0–2	0–1
vs. Penn State	2–0	1−0	1−0	0−2	1−0	1−0	0−1	1−1	0−1	2–0	–	2–0	0–1	1–1
vs. Purdue	1–0	0−2	1−0	1−1	1−0	0−2	1−1	0−1	0−1	0–2	0−2	–	1–0	0–1
vs. Rutgers	0–1	0−2	2−0	1−1	1−0	1−1	0−2	1−0	0−2	2–0	1−0	0–1	–	1–0
vs. Wisconsin	2–0	0−1	2−0	1−1	2−0	0−1	0−1	0−2	0−2	1–0	1−1	1–0	0–1	–
Total	16–4	7–12	14–6	9–11	14–3	9–11	6–14	3–16	6–13	12–8	7–12	13–6	10–10	10–10

== Honors and awards ==
=== All-Big Ten awards and teams ===
On March 9, 2021, the Big Ten announced most of its conference awards.

Honor	Coaches	Media
Player of the Year	Luka Garza, Iowa	Luka Garza, Iowa
Coach of the Year	Juwan Howard, Michigan	Juwan Howard, Michigan
Freshman of the Year	Hunter Dickinson, Michigan	Hunter Dickinson, Michigan
Defensive Player of the Year	Darryl Morsell, Maryland	Not Selected
Sixth Man of the Year	André Curbelo, Illinois	Not Selected
All-Big Ten First Team	Kofi Cockburn, Illinois	Kofi Cockburn, Illinois
All-Big Ten First Team	Ayo Dosunmu, Illinois	Ayo Dosunmu, Illinois
All-Big Ten First Team	Luka Garza, Iowa	Luka Garza, Iowa
All-Big Ten First Team	E. J. Liddell, Ohio State	Trayce Jackson-Davis, Indiana
All-Big Ten First Team	Trevion Williams, Purdue	Hunter Dickinson, Michigan
All-Big Ten Second Team	Trayce Jackson-Davis, Indiana	E. J. Liddell, Ohio State
All-Big Ten Second Team	Joe Wieskamp, Iowa	Joe Wieskamp, Iowa
All-Big Ten Second Team	Hunter Dickinson, Michigan	Marcus Carr, Minnesota
All-Big Ten Second Team	Isaiah Livers, Michigan	Isaiah Livers, Michigan
All-Big Ten Second Team	Franz Wagner, Michigan	Trevion Williams, Purdue
All-Big Ten Third Team	Marcus Carr, Minnesota	Franz Wagner, Michigan
All-Big Ten Third Team	Aaron Henry, Michigan State	Aaron Henry, Michigan State
All-Big Ten Third Team	Duane Washington Jr., Ohio State	Duane Washington Jr., Ohio State
All-Big Ten Third Team	Ron Harper Jr., Rutgers	Ron Harper Jr., Rutgers
All-Big Ten Third Team	D'Mitrik Trice, Wisconsin	D'Mitrik Trice, Wisconsin
All-Big Ten Honorable Mention	Trent Frazier, Illinois	Trent Frazier, Illinois
All-Big Ten Honorable Mention	Jordan Bohannon, Iowa	Jordan Bohannon, Iowa
All-Big Ten Honorable Mention	Eric Ayala, Maryland	Eric Ayala, Maryland
All-Big Ten Honorable Mention	Aaron Wiggins, Maryland	Aaron Wiggins, Maryland
All-Big Ten Honorable Mention	Geo Baker, Rutgers	CJ Fredrick, Iowa
All-Big Ten Honorable Mention	Not Selected	Darryl Morsell, Maryland
All-Big Ten Honorable Mention	Not Selected	Teddy Allen, Nebraska
All-Big Ten Honorable Mention	Not Selected	John Harrar, Penn State
All-Big Ten Honorable Mention	Not Selected	Myreon Jones, Penn State
All-Big Ten Honorable Mention	Not Selected	Myles Johnson, Rutgers
All-Big Ten Honorable Mention	Not Selected	Jacob Young, Rutgers
All-Freshman Team	Andre Curbelo, Illinois	Not Selected
All-Freshman Team	Keegan Murray, Iowa	Not Selected
All-Freshman Team	Hunter Dickinson, Michigan	Not Selected
All-Freshman Team	Zach Edey, Purdue	Not Selected
All-Freshman Team	Jaden Ivey, Purdue	Not Selected
All-Defensive Team	Trent Frazier, Illinois	Not Selected
All-Defensive Team	Darryl Morsell, Maryland	Not Selected
All-Defensive Team	Aaron Henry, Michigan State	Not Selected
All-Defensive Team	Jamari Wheeler, Penn State	Not Selected
All-Defensive Team	Myles Johnson, Rutgers	Not Selected

== Postseason ==
=== Big Ten tournament ===
First round Wednesday, March 10; BTN
12	Northwestern	46
13	Minnesota	51
11	Penn State	72
14	Nebraska	66

Second round Thursday, March 11; BTN
8	Maryland	68
9	Michigan State	57
5	Ohio State	79
13	Minnesota	75
7	Rutgers	61
10	Indiana	50
6	Wisconsin	75
11	Penn State	74

Quarterfinals; Friday, March 12; BTN
1	Michigan	79
8	Maryland	66
4	Purdue	78
5	Ohio State	87*
2	Illinois	90
7	Rutgers	68
3	Iowa	62
6	Wisconsin	57

Semifinals; Saturday, March 13; CBS
1	Michigan	67
5	Ohio State	68
2	Illinois	82
3	Iowa	71

Championship; Sunday, March 14; CBS
5	Ohio State	88
2	Illinois	91*

* denotes overtime period

=== NCAA tournament ===
The winner of the Big Ten tournament, Illinois, received the conference's automatic bid to the NCAA tournament. Nine Big Ten teams received bids to the NCAA tournament, the most of any conference in the tournament and the most in the conference's history.

Seed	Region	School	First Four	First Round	Second Round	Sweet Sixteen	Elite Eight	Final Four	Championship
1	Midwest	Illinois	N/A	defeated (16) Drexel 78–49	lost to (8) Loyola–Chicago 58–71				
1	East	Michigan	N/A	defeated (16) Texas Southern 82–66	defeated (8) LSU 86–78	defeated (4) Florida State 76–58	lost to (11) UCLA 49–51		
2	South	Ohio State	N/A	lost to (15) Oral Roberts 72–75^{OT}					
2	West	Iowa	N/A	defeated (15) Grand Canyon 86–74	lost to (7) Oregon 80–95				
4	South	Purdue	N/A	lost to (13) North Texas 69–78^{OT}					
9	South	Wisconsin	N/A	defeated (8) North Carolina 85–62	lost to (1) Baylor 63–76				
10	Midwest	Rutgers	N/A	defeated (7) Clemson 60–56	lost to (2) Houston 60–63				
10	East	Maryland	N/A	defeated (7) UConn 63–54	lost to (2) Alabama 77–96				
11	East	Michigan State	lost to (11) UCLA 80–86^{OT}						
		W–L (%):	0–1 (.000)	6–2 (.750)	1–5 (.167)	1–0 (1.000)	0–1 (.000)	0–0 (–)	0–0 (–) Total: 8–9 (.471)

=== 2021 NBA draft ===
Seven Big Ten athletes were selected in the 2021 NBA draft.

Rnd.	Pick	Player	Pos.	Nationality (Note: Nationality indicates the player's national team or representative nationality. If a player has not competed at the international level, then the nationality indicates the national team which the player is eligible to represent according to FIBA rules.)	Team	School / club team
1	8	Franz Wagner	SF	Germany	Orlando Magic (from Chicago) (Note: March 25, 2021: Chicago Bulls to Orlando Magic: Orlando acquired Wendell Carter Jr., Otto Porter Jr., 2021 and 2023 first-round picks; Chicago acquired Nikola Vučević, and Al-Farouq Aminu)	Michigan (So.)
2	38	Ayo Dosunmu	PG	United States	Chicago Bulls (from New Orleans) (Note: February 1, 2018: New Orleans Pelicans to Chicago Bulls: Chicago acquired Ömer Aşık, Tony Allen, Jameer Nelson, a 2018 first-round pick, and the option to swap a 2021 second-round pick with New Orleans; New Orleans Pelicans acquired Nikola Mirotić and a 2018 second-round pick)	Illinois (Jr.)
2	41	Joe Wieskamp	SF	United States	San Antonio Spurs	Iowa (Jr.)
2	42	Isaiah Livers	SF	United States	Detroit Pistons (from Charlotte via New York) (Note: February 7, 2018: Charlotte Hornets to New York Knicks: New York acquired Johnny O'Bryant III, a 2020 second-round pick, and a 2021 second-round pick; Charlotte acquired Willy Hernangómez; February 8, 2021: New York Knicks to Detroit Pistons.: Detroit acquired Dennis Smith Jr. and a 2021 second-round pick; New York acquired Derrick Rose)	Michigan (Sr.)
2	46	Dalano Banton	PG	Canada	Toronto Raptors (from Memphis via Sacramento) (Note: July 17, 2018: Memphis Grizzlies to Sacramento Kings: Sacramento acquired Ben McLemore, Deyonta Davis, a 2021 second-round pick, and cash considerations; Memphis acquired Garrett Temple; March 25, 2021: Sacramento Kings to Toronto Raptors: Toronto acquired a 2021 second-round pick; Sacramento acquired Terence Davis)	Nebraska (So.)
2	52	Luka Garza	C	United States	Detroit Pistons (from LA Lakers via Detroit to Houston to Sacramento) (Note: February 6, 2019: Los Angeles Lakers to Detroit Pistons: Detroit acquired Sviatoslav Mykhailiuk, and a 2021 second-round pick; LA Lakers acquired Reggie Bullock; November 24, 2020: Detroit Pistons to Houston Rockets: Houston acquired Christian Wood, a conditional first-round pick, and a 2021 second-round pick; Detroit acquired Trevor Ariza, the draft rights to Isaiah Stewart, a 2027 second-round pick, and cash considerations; November 25, 2020: Houston Rockets to Sacramento Kings: Sacramento acquired a 2021 second-round pick and cash considerations; Houston acquired the draft rights to Kenyon Martin Jr.; March 25, 2021: Sacramento Kings to Detroit Pistons: Detroit acquired Cory Joseph, 2021and 2024 second-round picks; Sacramento acquired Delon Wright)	Iowa (Sr.)
2	55	Aaron Wiggins	SG	United States	Oklahoma City Thunder (from Denver via Philadelphia to Golden State) (Note: July 6, 2018: Denver Nuggets to Philadelphia 76ers: Philadelphia acquired Wilson Chandler and a 2021 second round pick; Denver acquired cash considerations; February 6, 2020: Philadelphia 76ers to Golden State Warriors: Golden State acquired 2020, 2021, and 2022 second-round picks; Philadelphia acquired Alec Burks and Glenn Robinson III)	Maryland (Jr.)

==== Pre-draft trades ====
Prior to the draft, the following trades were made and resulted in exchanges of draft picks between teams.
