= Kansas Jayhawks men's basketball statistical leaders =

The Kansas Jayhawks men's basketball statistical leaders are individual statistical leaders of the Kansas Jayhawks men's basketball program in various categories, including points, rebounds, assists, steals, and blocks. Within those areas, the lists identify single-game, single-season, and career leaders. The Jayhawks represent the University of Kansas in the NCAA's Big 12 Conference.

Kansas began competing in intercollegiate basketball in 1898. However, the school's record book does not generally list records from before the 1950s, as records from before this period are often incomplete and inconsistent. Since scoring was much lower in this era, and teams played much fewer games during a typical season, it is likely that few or no players from this era would appear on these lists anyway.

The NCAA did not officially record assists as a stat until the 1983–84 season, and blocks and steals until the 1985–86 season, but Kansas' record books includes players in these stats before these seasons. These lists are updated through the end of the 2020–21 season.

== Scoring ==
Career
Rank	Player	Points	Seasons
1	Danny Manning	2,951	1984–85 1985–86 1986–87 1987–88
2	Nick Collison	2,097	1999–00 2000–01 2001–02 2002–03
3	Raef LaFrentz	2,066	1994–95 1995–96 1996–97 1997–98
4	Clyde Lovellette	1,979	1949–50 1950–51 1951–52
5	Sherron Collins	1,888	2006–07 2007–08 2008–09 2009–10
6	Frank Mason III	1,885	2013–14 2014–15 2015–16 2016–17
7	Darnell Valentine	1,821	1977–78 1978–79 1979–80 1980–81
8	Keith Langford	1,812	2001–02 2002–03 2003–04 2004–05
9	Perry Ellis	1,798	2012–13 2013–14 2014–15 2015–16
10	Paul Pierce	1,768	1995–96 1996–97 1997–98

Season
Rank	Player	Points	Season
1	Danny Manning	942	1987–88
2	Clyde Lovellette	886	1951–52
3	Danny Manning	860	1986–87
4	Wilt Chamberlain	800	1956–57
5	Paul Pierce	777	1997–98
6	Frank Mason III	753	2016–17
7	Drew Gooden	734	2001–02
8	Ochai Agbaji	732	2021–22
9	Jalen Wilson	723	2022–23
10	Nick Collison	702	2002–03

Single game
Rank	Player	Points	Season	Opponent
1	Wilt Chamberlain	52	1956–57	Northwestern
2	Bud Stallworth	50	1971–72	Missouri
3	John Douglas	46	1976–77	Iowa State
	Wilt Chamberlain	46	1957–58	Nebraska
5	Wilt Chamberlain	45	1956–57	Colorado
6	B. H. Born	44	1952–53	Colorado
	Clyde Lovellette	44	1951–52	Saint Louis
8	Terry Brown	42	1990–91	N.C. State
	Danny Manning	42	1986–87	SMS
	Walt Wesley	42	1964–65	Loyola (Ill.)
	Clyde Lovellette	42	1951–52	SMU

== Rebounds ==
Career
Rank	Player	Rebounds	Seasons
1	Danny Manning	1,187	1984–85 1985–86 1986–87 1987–88
2	Raef LaFrentz	1,186	1994–95 1995–96 1996–97 1997–98
3	Nick Collison	1,143	1999–00 2000–01 2001–02 2002–03
4	Bill Bridges	1,081	1958–59 1959–60 1960–61
5	Eric Chenowith	933	1997–98 1998–99 1999–00 2000–01
6	Drew Gooden	905	1999–00 2000–01 2001–02
7	Wayne Simien	884	2001–02 2002–03 2003–04 2004–05
8	Wilt Chamberlain	877	1956–57 1957–58
9	Cole Aldrich	860	2007–08 2008–09 2009–10
10	Scot Pollard	850	1993–94 1994–95 1995–96 1996–97

Season
Rank	Player	Rebounds	Season
1	Wilt Chamberlain	510	1956–57
2	Thomas Robinson	463	2011–12
3	Drew Gooden	423	2001–02
4	Clyde Lovellette	410	1951–52
5	Cole Aldrich	387	2008–09
6	Bill Bridges	385	1959–60
7	Nick Collison	380	2002–03
8	Dedric Lawson	371	2018–19
9	Wilt Chamberlain	367	1957–58
10	Hunter Dickinson	361	2023–24

Single game
Rank	Player	Rebounds	Season	Opponent
1	Wilt Chamberlain	36	1957–58	Iowa State
2	Wilt Chamberlain	31	1957–58	Northwestern
3	Bill Bridges	30	1960–61	Northwestern
4	Wilt Chamberlain	28	1957–58	Washington
5	Wilt Chamberlain	27	1957–58	Missouri
6	Dave Robisch	26	1969–70	Iowa State
7	Bill Bridges	24	1960–61	Nebraska
	Bill Bridges	24	1958–59	Nebraska
	Wilt Chamberlain	24	1956–57	Iowa State
	Wilt Chamberlain	24	1956–57	Iowa State
	Wilt Chamberlain	24	1956–57	Wisconsin
	Lew Johnson	24	1954–55	Oklahoma

== Assists ==
Career
Rank	Player	Assists	Seasons
1	Aaron Miles	954	2001–02 2002–03 2003–04 2004–05
2	Dajuan Harris Jr.	865	2020–21 2021–22 2022–23 2023–24 2024–25
3	Jacque Vaughn	804	1993–94 1994–95 1995–96 1996–97
4	Cedric Hunter	684	1983–84 1984–85 1985–86 1986–87
5	Kirk Hinrich	668	1999–00 2000–01 2001–02 2002–03
6	Devonte' Graham	632	2014–15 2015–16 2016–17 2017–18
7	Darnell Valentine	609	1977–78 1978–79 1979–80 1980–81
8	Frank Mason III	576	2013–14 2014–15 2015–16 2016–17
9	Tyshawn Taylor	575	2008–09 2009–10 2010–11 2011–12
10	Adonis Jordan	568	1989–90 1990–91 1991–92 1992–93

Season
Rank	Player	Assists	Season
1	Devonte' Graham	282	2017–18
2	Cedric Hunter	278	1985–86
3	Aaron Miles	252	2001–02
4	Ryan Robertson	248	1997–98
5	Aaron Miles	244	2002–03
6	Aaron Miles	242	2003–04
7	Jacque Vaughn	238	1994–95
8	Kirk Hinrich	229	2000–01
9	Dajuan Harris Jr.	224	2022–23
10	Jacque Vaughn	223	1995–96

Single game
Rank	Player	Assists	Season	Opponent
1	Tom Kivisto	18	1973–74	Nebraska
2	Cedric Hunter	16	1985–86	Oklahoma
3	Aaron Miles	15	2001–02	Texas Tech
4	Cedric Hunter	14	1985–86	Duke
5	Devonte' Graham	13	2017–18	West Virginia
	Tyshawn Taylor	13	2011–12	Ohio State
	Aaron Miles	13	2002–03	Emporia State
	Aaron Miles	13	2001–02	Texas
	Jacque Vaughn	13	1995–96	Rice
	Jacque Vaughn	13	1994–95	SMU

== Steals ==
Career
Rank	Player	Steals	Seasons
1	Darnell Valentine	336	1977–78 1978–79 1979–80 1980–81
2	Mario Chalmers	283	2005–06 2006–07 2007–08
3	Aaron Miles	264	2001–02 2002–03 2003–04 2004–05
4	Dajuan Harris Jr.	262	2020–21 2021–22 2022–23 2023–24 2024–25
5	Danny Manning	250	1984–85 1985–86 1986–87 1987–88
6	Russell Robinson	247	2004–05 2005–06 2006–07 2007–08
7	Kirk Hinrich	206	1999–00 2000–01 2001–02 2002–03
8	Devonte' Graham	197	2014–15 2015–16 2016–17 2017–18
9	Kevin Pritchard	190	1986–87 1987–88 1988–89 1989–90
10	Nick Bradford	187	1996–97 1997–98 1998–99 1999–00

Season
Rank	Player	Steals	Season
1	Mario Chalmers	97	2007–08
	Mario Chalmers	97	2006–07
3	Darnell Valentine	92	1980–81
4	Aaron Miles	91	2002–03
	Darnell Valentine	91	1978–79
6	Mario Chalmers	89	2005–06
7	Alonzo Jamison	83	1991–92
8	Alonzo Jamison	80	1990–91
	Danny Manning	80	1985–86
	Darnell Valentine	80	1977–78

Single game
Rank	Player	Steals	Season	Opponent
1	Aaron Miles	9	2002–03	Iowa State
2	Russell Robinson	8	2007–08	Yale
	Nick Bradford	8	1999–00	Kansas State
	Alonzo Jamison	8	1991–92	Pepperdine
	Alonzo Jamison	8	1990–91	Marquette
6	Xavier Henry	7	2009–10	Baylor
	Mario Chalmers	7	2007–08	DePaul
	Russell Robinson	7	2005–06	Oklahoma State
	Aaron Miles	7	2003–04	Michigan State
	Adonis Jordan	7	1992–93	N.C. State
	Kevin Pritchard	7	1987–88	Pomona-Pitzer
	Danny Manning	7	1985–86	Missouri
	Darnell Valentine	7	1980–81	Oklahoma
	Tony Guy	7	1978–79	Kansas State
	Darnell Valentine	7	1977–78	Fordham

== Blocks ==
Career
Rank	Player	Blocks	Seasons
1	Jeff Withey	311	2009–10 2010–11 2011–12 2012–13
2	Greg Ostertag	258	1991–92 1992–93 1993–94 1994–95
3	Cole Aldrich	253	2007–08 2008–09 2009–10
4	Nick Collison	243	1999–00 2000–01 2001–02 2002–03
5	Eric Chenowith	242	1997–98 1998–99 1999–00 2000–01
6	Scot Pollard	218	1993–94 1994–95 1995–96 1996–97
7	Danny Manning	200	1984–85 1985–86 1986–87 1987–88
8	Udoka Azubuike	172	2016–17 2017–18 2018–19 2019–20
9	John Crawford	155	1977–78 1978–79 1979–80 1980–81
10	Sasha Kaun	150	2004–05 2005–06 2006–07 2007–08

Season
Rank	Player	Blocks	Season
1	Jeff Withey	146	2012–13
2	Jeff Withey	140	2011–12
3	Cole Aldrich	125	2009–10
4	Greg Ostertag	97	1993–94
5	Cole Aldrich	94	2008–09
6	Greg Ostertag	91	1994–95
	Flory Bidunga	91	2025–26
8	Scot Pollard	84	1995–96
9	Nick Collison	83	2001–02
10	Udoka Azubuike	80	2019–20

Single game
Rank	Player	Blocks	Season	Opponent
1	Jeff Withey	12	2012–13	San Jose State
2	Jeff Withey	10	2011–12	North Carolina State
	Cole Aldrich	10	2008–09	Dayton
4	Jeff Withey	9	2012–13	West Virginia
	Jeff Withey	9	2012–13	Temple
	Jeff Withey	9	2011–12	Kansas State
	Jeff Withey	9	2011–12	Long Beach State
8	Joel Embiid	8	2013–14	Oklahoma State
	Jeff Withey	8	2011–12	Texas A&M
	Greg Ostertag	8	1994–95	Florida
	Greg Ostertag	8	1993–94	Oklahoma State
	Rick Suttle	8	1974–75	Kansas State
