= Kofi Cockburn =

Jamaican basketball player (born 1999)

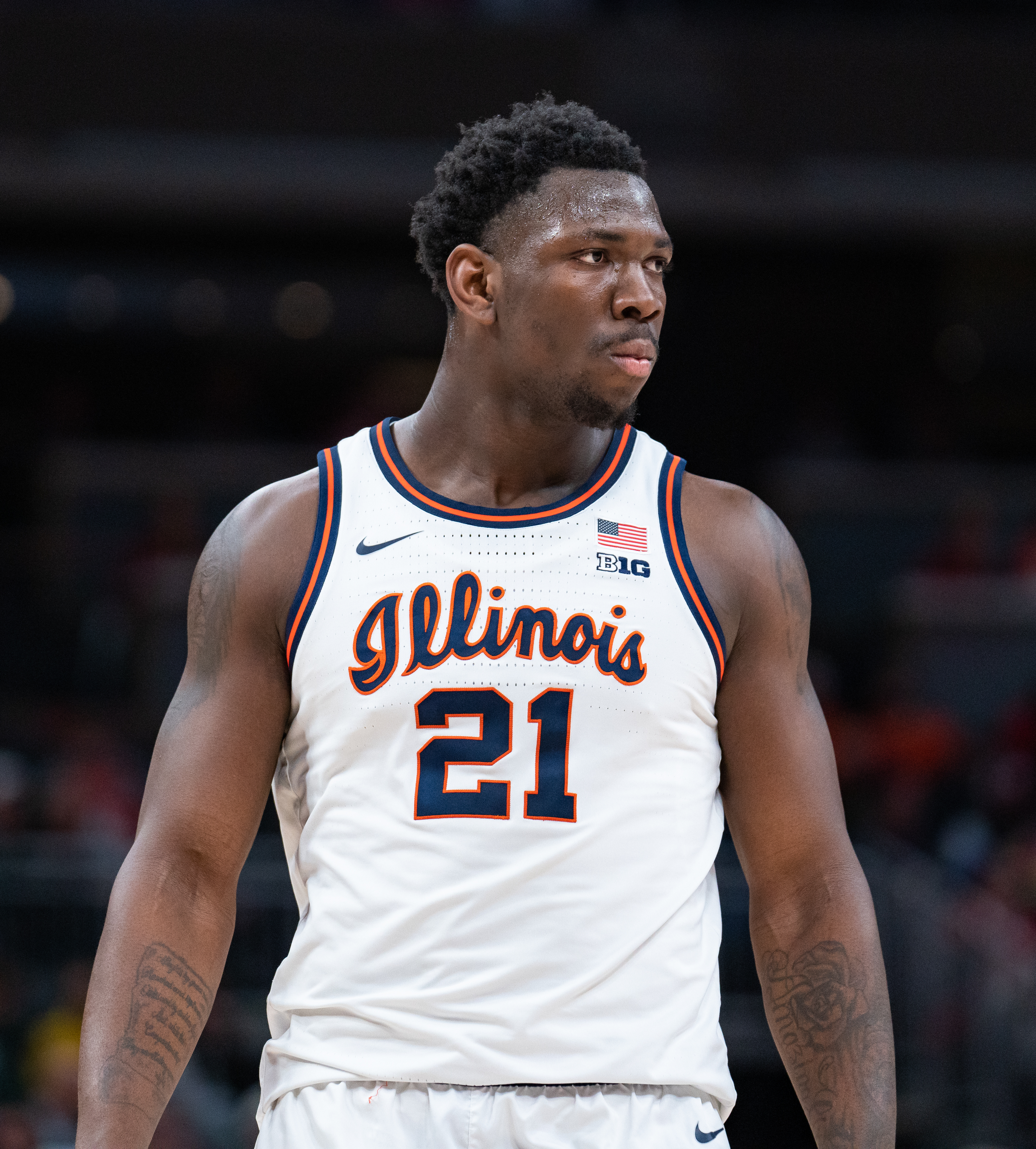
- Cockburn with Illinois in 2022

No. 23 – Hiroshima Dragonflies
- Position: Center
- League: B.League

Personal information
- Born: 1 September 1999 (age 27) Kingston, Jamaica
- Listed height: 7 ft 0 in (2.13 m)
- Listed weight: 293 lb (133 kg)

Career information
- High school: Christ the King (Middle Village, New York); Oak Hill Academy (Mouth of Wilson, Virginia)
- College: Illinois (2019–2022)
- NBA draft: 2022: undrafted
- Playing career: 2022–present

Career history
- 2022–2023: Niigata Albirex
- 2023–2025: Seoul Samsung Thunders
- 2025–present: Hiroshima Dragonflies

Career highlights
- Consensus first-team All-American (2022); Consensus second-team All-American (2021); 2× First-team All-Big Ten (2021, 2022); Big Ten Freshman of the Year (2020); 2× Nike Hoop Summit (2018, 2019)

Kofi Mazeze Cockburn (/ˈkoʊbɜːrn/ KOH-burn; born 1 September 1999) is a Jamaican professional basketball player for the Hiroshima Dragonflies of the Japanese B.League. He played college basketball for the Illinois Fighting Illini.

== Early life ==
Cockburn was born in Kingston, Jamaica, and in 2014, moved to Queens, New York, to be with his mother, who had moved to Queens in 2009. In addition to his participation in basketball at a young age, Cockburn also played soccer, cricket, and ran in track and field.

== High school career ==
Cockburn first enrolled in high school at St. Andrew Technical High in Kingston, Jamaica, then Christ the King Regional High School in Middle Village, New York. He played Amateur Athletic Union (AAU) basketball for the New York (NY) Rens, and was teammates with his future Illinois teammate Alan Griffin. During the summer of 2018 on the Nike Elite Youth Basketball League (EYBL) circuit with the NY Rens, Cockburn averaged 16.3 points and 10.3 rebounds per game, while shooting 53.9 percent from the field. Prior to his junior year, Cockburn was selected to participate in the 2017 Basketball Without Borders Americas camp that was held in Nassau, Bahamas. After his junior season, Cockburn was named to the World Team for the 2018 Nike Hoop Summit. For his senior season, Cockburn transferred to Oak Hill Academy in Mouth of Wilson, Virginia, where he was teammates with fellow five-star recruits Cole Anthony and Cameron Thomas.

=== Recruiting ===
Prior to his senior high school season at Oak Hill Academy, Cockburn held 26 scholarship offers and narrowed the list of schools he was considering to 12, which included Cincinnati, Florida State, Illinois, Kansas, Kentucky, LSU, Oregon, Pittsburgh, South Carolina, St. John's, Syracuse and UConn. Citing his relationship with Illinois assistant coach Orlando Antigua and the rest of the Illinois coaching staff, Cockburn committed to playing college basketball for Illinois on 6 January 2019. Cockburn was a consensus four-star recruit and was considered a top 50 player in the 2019 class.

College recruiting
Name	Hometown	School	Height	Weight	Commit date
Kofi Cockburn; C	Kingston, Jamaica	Oak Hill Academy (VA)	6 ft 11 in (2.11 m)	255 lb (116 kg)	Jan 6, 2019
Kofi Cockburn; C	Recruit ratings: Rivals: 247Sports: ESPN: (88)				
Overall recruit ranking: Rivals: 45 247Sports: 54 ESPN: 50
Note: In many cases, Scout, Rivals, 247Sports, On3, and ESPN may conflict in their listings of height and weight.; In these cases, the average was taken. ESPN grades are on a 100-point scale.; Sources: "Illinois 2019 Basketball Commitments". Rivals.; "2019 Illinois Fighting Illini Recruiting Class". ESPN.; "2019 Team Ranking". Rivals.

== College career ==
=== 2019–20 season ===
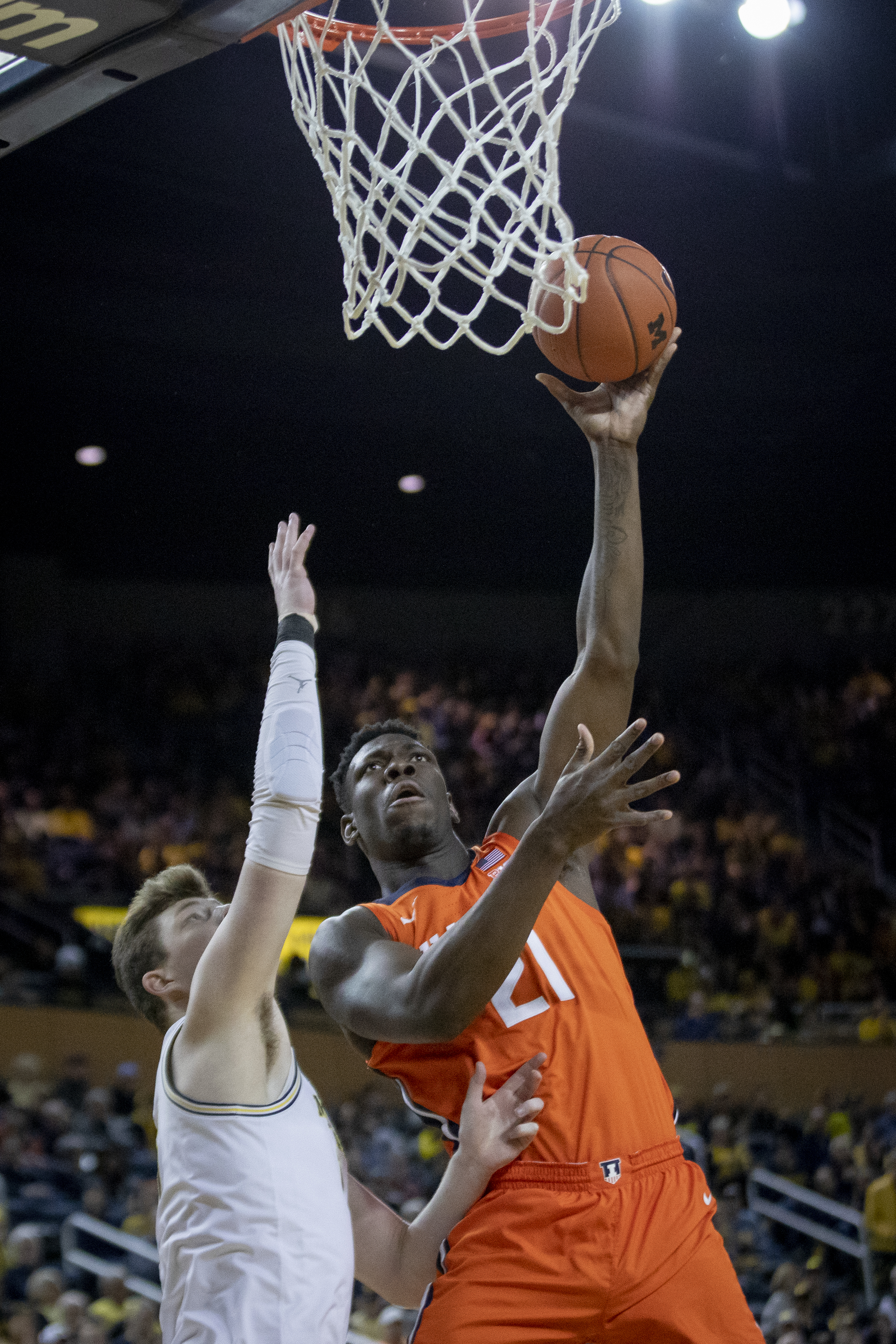
Cockburn (right) with Illinois in 2020

In his debut for Illinois, Cockburn had 10 points and 11 rebounds to help defeat Nicholls 78–70 in overtime. The following game, Cockburn scored 23 points and pulled down 14 rebounds in a 83–71 win over Grand Canyon. Cockburn was named Big Ten player of the week on 25 November after setting a school freshman record for rebounds in a game with 17 to go along with 18 points in a win versus The Citadel. On 11 December 2020, Cockburn had 19 points, 10 rebounds and four blocks in a 71–62 victory over fifth-ranked Michigan, Illinois' first win over a top-five program since 2013. At the close of the regular season, Cockburn was named Big Ten Freshman of the Year. He was selected to the Third Team All-Big Ten by the media and was Honorable Mention All-Conference according to the coaches. As a freshman, Cockburn was Illinois' second-leading scorer and top rebounder, averaging 13.3 points and 8.8 rebounds per game while leading the Illini with 1.4 blocks per game. He shot 53.2 percent from the floor and 67.7 percent at the foul line. Following the season, he declared for the 2020 NBA draft.

=== 2020–21 season ===
On August 1, Cockburn announced he was pulling out of the draft and returning for his sophomore season. As a sophomore, Cockburn averaged 17.7 points, 9.5 rebounds and 1.3 blocks per game, shooting 65.4 percent from the field. He was a Second Team All-American and First Team All-Big Ten selection. Following the season, he declared for the 2021 NBA draft and entered the transfer portal.

=== 2021–22 season ===
Cockburn ultimately returned for his junior season at Illinois. He was suspended for the first three games of his junior season due to selling apparel and memorabilia. On 26 November 2021, Cockburn scored a career-high 38 points along with 10 rebounds in a 94–85 win against Texas–Rio Grande Valley. He was named to the First Team All-Big Ten. As a junior, Cockburn averaged 20.9 points and 10.6 rebounds per game. On 20 April 2022, he declared for the 2022 NBA draft, forgoing his remaining college eligibility.

== Professional career ==
Cockburn went undrafted in the 2022 NBA draft. He then signed an Exhibit 10 contract with the Utah Jazz. His contract wasn't picked up by the Jazz.

On 16 November 2022, Cockburn signed with the Niigata Albirex of the Japanese B. League. He averaged 19 points and 12.3 rebounds per game.

On 20 June 2023, Cockburn signed with the Seoul Samsung Thunders of the Korean Basketball League (KBL). In May 2024, Cockburn re-signed with the Seoul Samsung Thunders.

On 19 May 2025, Cockburn signed with the Hiroshima Dragonflies of the Japanese B.League.

== Career statistics ==
Legend
GP	Games played	GS	Games started	MPG	Minutes per game
FG%	Field goal percentage	3P%	3-point field goal percentage	FT%	Free throw percentage
RPG	Rebounds per game	APG	Assists per game	SPG	Steals per game
BPG	Blocks per game	PPG	Points per game	**Bold**	Career high

=== Domestic leagues ===
Year	Team	League	GP	GS	MPG	FG%	3P%	FT%	RPG	APG	SPG	BPG	PPG
2022–23	(Japan) Niigata	B.League	49	43	32.3	.571	–	.607	12.2	1.9	.7	.8	19.0
2023–24	(South Korea) Seoul Samsung	KBL	48	43	28.9	.576	–	.623	11.8	2.3	.5	.8	23.6
2024–25	(South Korea) Seoul Samsung	KBL	25	18	24.4	.588	–	.656	10.2	1.3	.4	.5	17.5

=== College ===
Year	Team	GP	GS	MPG	FG%	3P%	FT%	RPG	APG	SPG	BPG	PPG
2019–20	Illinois	**31**	**31**	27.4	.532	.000	**.677**	8.8	.6	.5	**1.4**	13.3
2020–21	Illinois	**31**	**31**	27.0	**.654**	–	.553	9.5	.2	.3	1.3	17.7
2021–22	Illinois	28	28	**30.7**	.593	–	.655	**10.6**	**.8**	**.8**	1.0	**20.9**
Career		90	90	28.3	.596	.000	.623	9.6	.5	.6	1.2	17.2
