= 2021 NCAA Men's Basketball All-Americans =

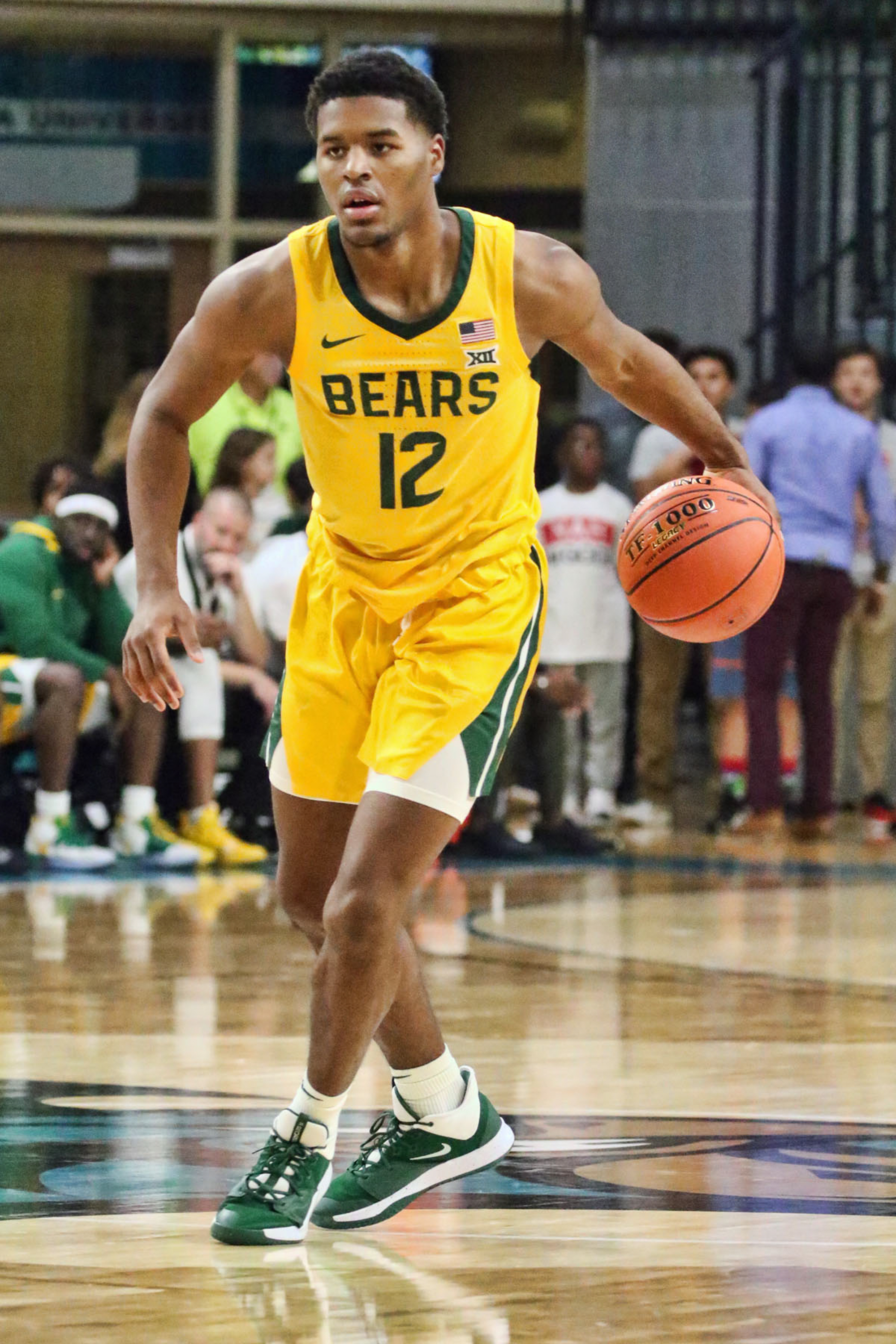
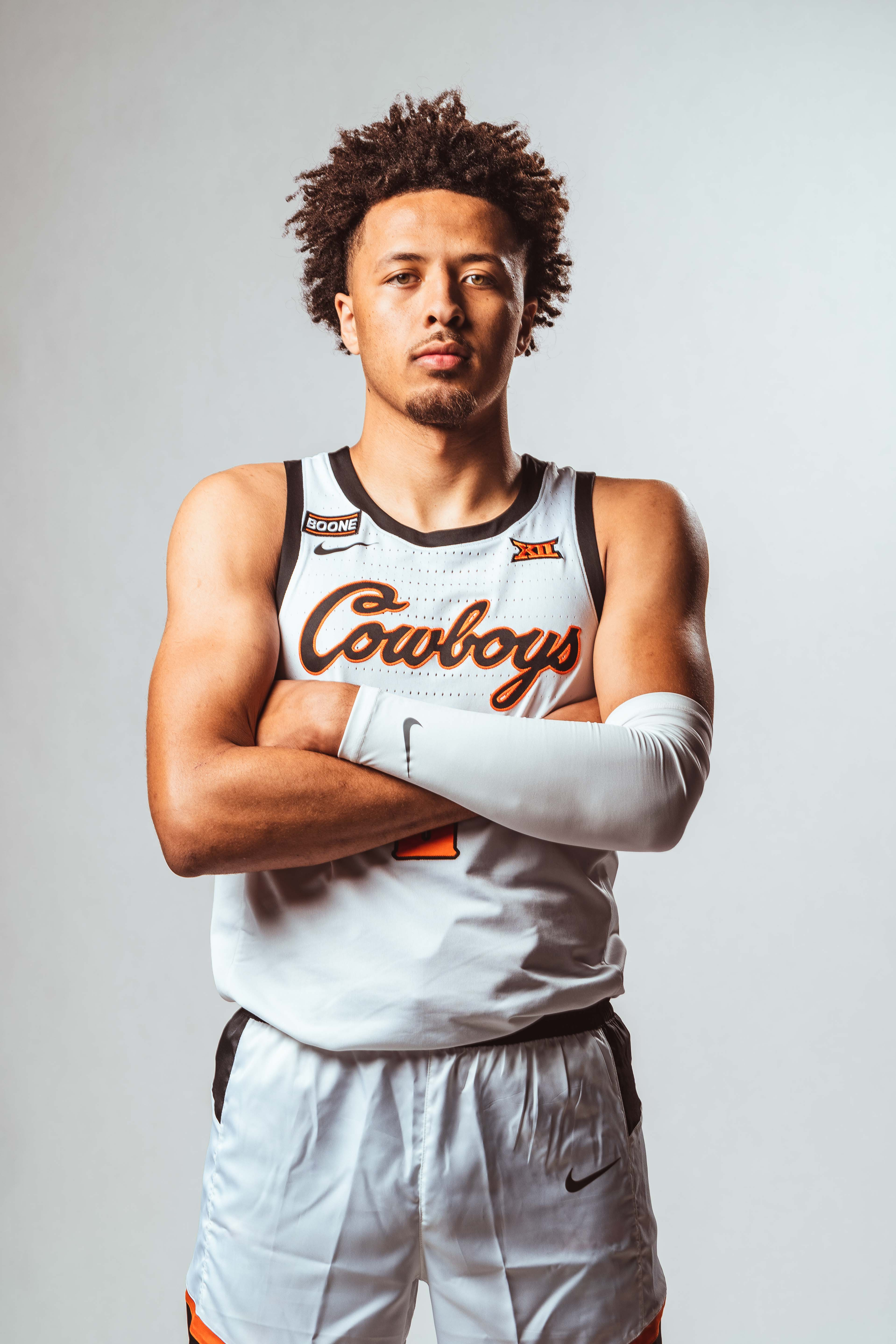
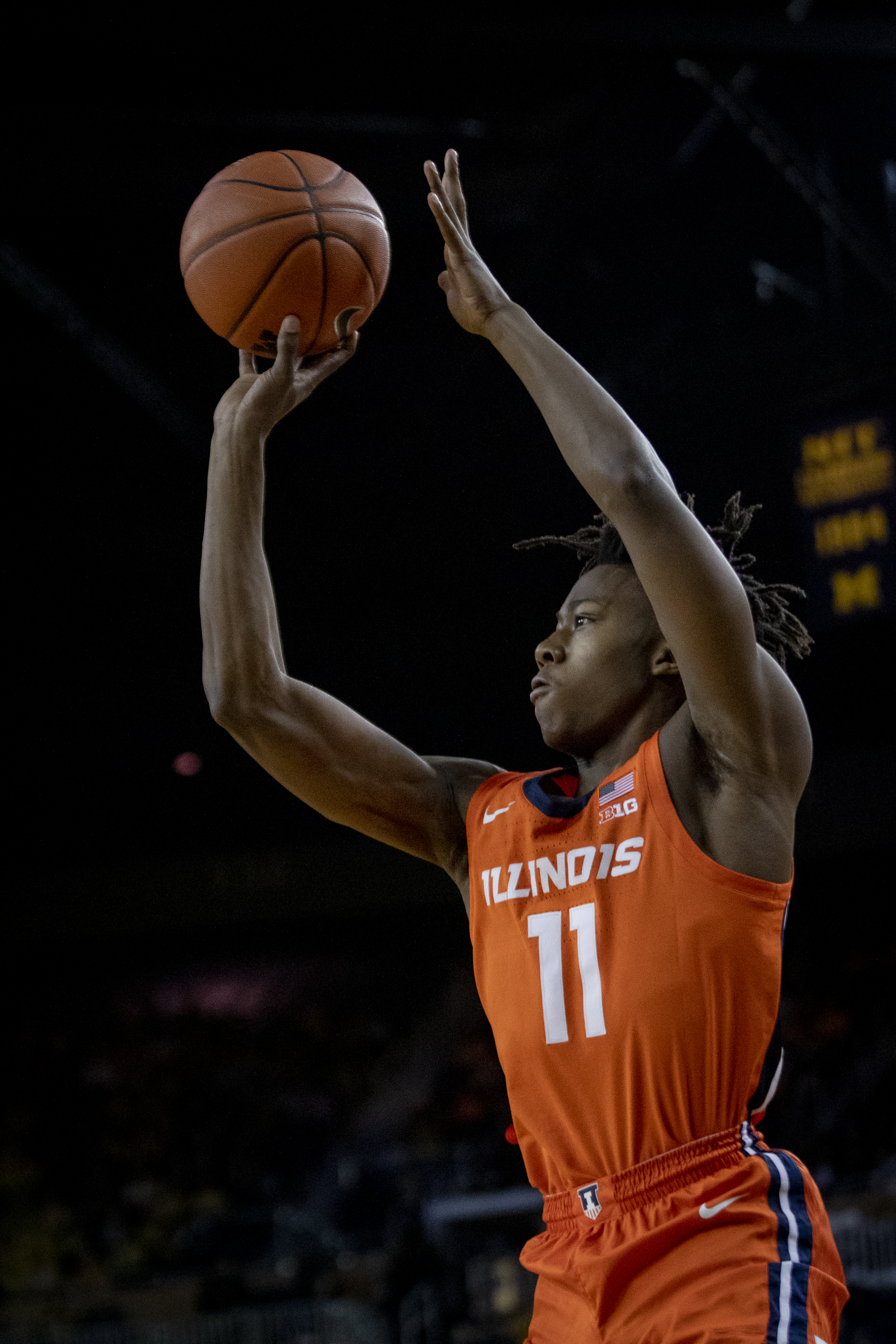
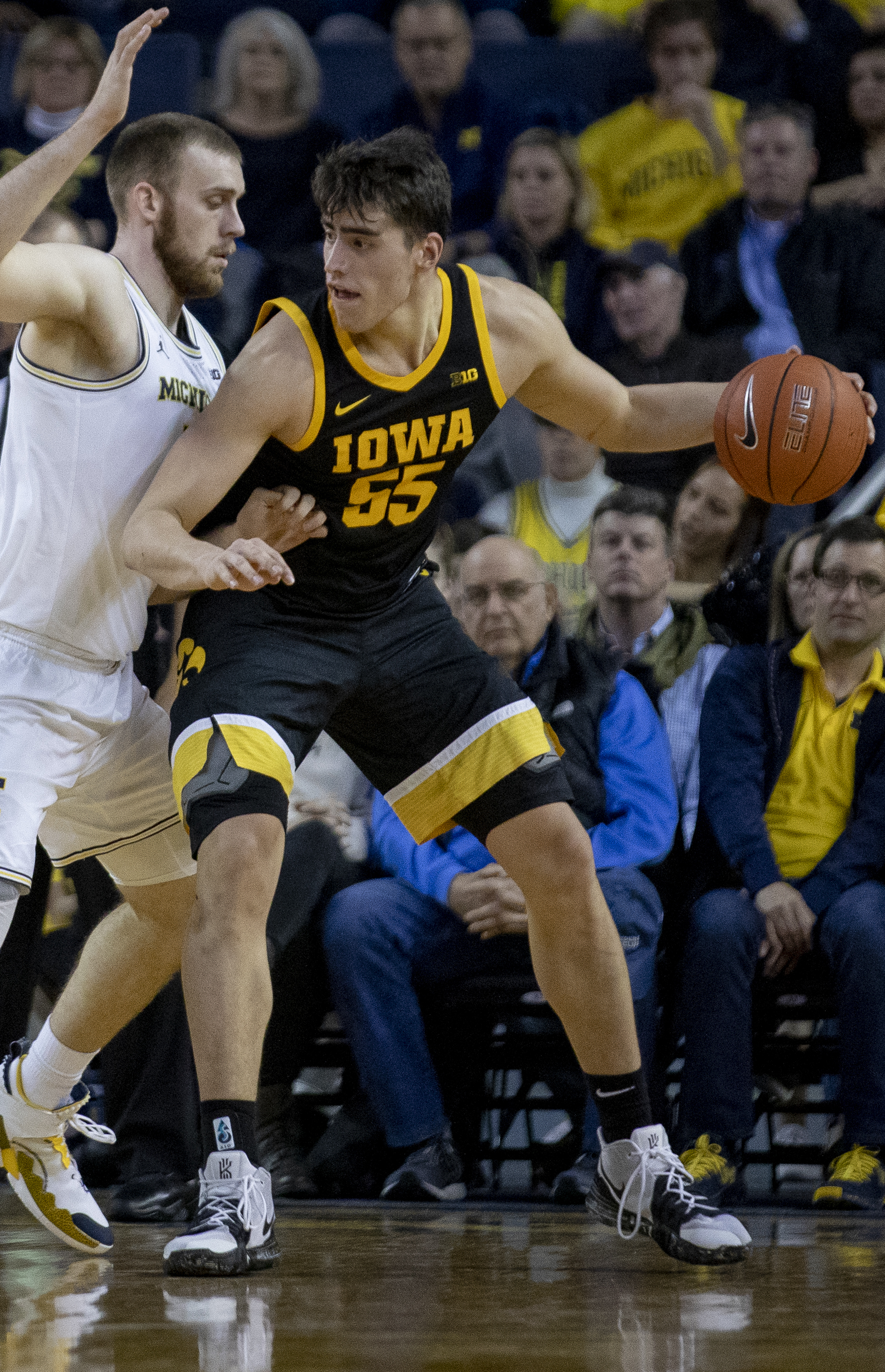
- Members of the 2021 Consensus All-America first team. Clockwise from upper left: Butler, Cunningham, Garza, Dosunmu (not pictured: Kispert).
- Awarded for: 2020–21 NCAA Division I men's basketball season

An All-American team is an honorary sports team composed of the best amateur players of a specific season for each team position—who in turn are given the honorific "All-America" and typically referred to as "All-American athletes", or simply "All-Americans". Although the honorees generally do not compete together as a unit, the term is used in U.S. team sports to refer to players who are selected by members of the national media. Walter Camp selected the first All-America team in the early days of American football in 1889. The 2021 NCAA Men's Basketball All-Americans are honorary lists that include All-American selections from the Associated Press (AP), the United States Basketball Writers Association (USBWA), Sporting News (SN), and the National Association of Basketball Coaches (NABC) for the 2020–21 NCAA Division I men's basketball season. All selectors choose three teams, while AP also lists honorable mention selections.

The Consensus 2021 College Basketball All-American team will be determined by aggregating the results of the four major All-American teams as determined by the National Collegiate Athletic Association (NCAA). Since United Press International was replaced by TSN in 1997, the four major selectors have been the aforementioned ones. AP has been a selector since 1948, NABC since 1957 and USBWA since 1960. To earn "consensus" status, a player must win honors based on a point system computed from the four different all-America teams. The point system consists of three points for first team, two points for second team and one point for third team. No honorable mention or fourth team or lower are used in the computation. The top five totals plus ties are first team and the next five plus ties are second team.

Although the aforementioned lists are used to determine consensus honors, there are numerous other All-American lists. The ten finalists for the John Wooden Award are described as Wooden All-Americans. The ten finalists for the Senior CLASS Award are described as Senior All-Americans. Other All-American lists include those determined by USA Today, Fox Sports, Yahoo! Sports and many others. The scholar-athletes selected by College Sports Information Directors of America (CoSIDA) are termed Academic All-Americans.

== 2021 Consensus All-America team ==
PG – Point guard
SG – Shooting guard
PF – Power forward
SF – Small forward
C – Center

Consensus First Team
Player	Position	Class	Team
Jared Butler	PG	Junior	Baylor
Cade Cunningham	PG/SG	Freshman	Oklahoma State
Ayo Dosunmu	SG	Junior	Illinois
Luka Garza	C	Senior	Iowa
Corey Kispert	SF	Senior	Gonzaga

Consensus Second Team
Player	Position	Class	Team
Kofi Cockburn	C	Sophomore	Illinois
Hunter Dickinson	C	Freshman	Michigan
Evan Mobley	PF/C	Freshman	Southern California
Jalen Suggs	PG/SG	Freshman	Gonzaga
Drew Timme	PF	Sophomore	Gonzaga

== Individual All-America teams ==
=== By player ===
Player	School	AP	USBWA	NABC	SN	CP	Notes
Jared Butler	Baylor	1	1	1	1	12	NCAA Final Four Most Outstanding Player
Cade Cunningham	Oklahoma State	1	1	1	1	12	USBWA National Freshman of the Year, Sporting News Freshman of the Year, Big 12 Player of the Year
Ayo Dosunmu	Illinois	1	1	1	1	12	Bob Cousy Award
Luka Garza	Iowa	1	1	1	1	12	Naismith Player of the Year, Wooden Award, AP Player of the Year, Oscar Robertson Trophy, Sporting News Player of the Year, NABC Player of the Year, Kareem Abdul-Jabbar Award, Pete Newell Big Man Award, Lute Olson Award, Senior CLASS Award, Big Ten Player of the Year
Corey Kispert	Gonzaga	1	1	1	1	12	Julius Erving Award, WCC Player of the Year, Academic All-American of the Year
Kofi Cockburn	Illinois	2	2	2	2	8	
Hunter Dickinson	Michigan	2	2	2	2	8	
Evan Mobley	USC	2	2	2	2	8	Pac-12 Player of the Year
Jalen Suggs	Gonzaga	2	2	2	2	8	
Drew Timme	Gonzaga	2	2	2	2	8	Karl Malone Award
Quentin Grimes	Houston	3	3	3	3	4	AAC co-Player of the Year
Trayce Jackson-Davis	Indiana		3	3	3	3	
Davion Mitchell	Baylor	3		3	3	3	NABC Defensive Player of the Year, Lefty Driesell Award, Naismith Defensive Player of the Year
Chris Duarte	Oregon	3	3			2	Jerry West Award
Collin Gillespie	Villanova		3	3		2	Big East co-Player of the Year, Robert V. Geasey Trophy
Herbert Jones	Alabama	3			3	2	SEC Player of the Year
Jeremiah Robinson-Earl	Villanova			3	3	2	Big East co-Player of the Year
Charles Bassey	Western Kentucky		3			1	C-USA Player of the Year
Cameron Krutwig	Loyola Chicago	3				1	MVC Player of the Year

=== By team ===
All-America Team
All-America Team	First team		Second team		Third team	
All-America Team	Player	School	Player	School	Player	School
Associated Press	Jared Butler	Baylor	Kofi Cockburn	Illinois	Chris Duarte	Oregon
Associated Press	Cade Cunningham	Oklahoma State	Hunter Dickinson	Michigan	Quentin Grimes	Houston
Associated Press	Ayo Dosunmu	Illinois	Evan Mobley	USC	Herbert Jones	Alabama
Associated Press	Luka Garza	Iowa	Jalen Suggs	Gonzaga	Cameron Krutwig	Loyola Chicago
Associated Press	Corey Kispert	Gonzaga	Drew Timme	Gonzaga	Davion Mitchell	Baylor
USBWA	Jared Butler	Baylor	Kofi Cockburn	Illinois	Charles Bassey	Western Kentucky
USBWA	Cade Cunningham	Oklahoma State	Hunter Dickinson	Michigan	Chris Duarte	Oregon
USBWA	Ayo Dosunmu	Illinois	Evan Mobley	USC	Collin Gillespie	Villanova
USBWA	Luka Garza	Iowa	Jalen Suggs	Gonzaga	Quentin Grimes	Houston
USBWA	Corey Kispert	Gonzaga	Drew Timme	Gonzaga	Trayce Jackson-Davis	Indiana
NABC	Jared Butler	Baylor	Kofi Cockburn	Illinois	Collin Gillespie	Villanova
NABC	Cade Cunningham	Oklahoma State	Hunter Dickinson	Michigan	Quentin Grimes	Houston
NABC	Ayo Dosunmu	Illinois	Evan Mobley	USC	Trayce Jackson-Davis	Indiana
NABC	Luka Garza	Iowa	Jalen Suggs	Gonzaga	Davion Mitchell	Baylor
NABC	Corey Kispert	Gonzaga	Drew Timme	Gonzaga	Jeremiah Robinson-Earl	Villanova
Sporting News
Sporting News	Jared Butler	Baylor	Kofi Cockburn	Illinois	Quentin Grimes	Houston
Sporting News	Cade Cunningham	Oklahoma State	Hunter Dickinson	Michigan	Trayce Jackson-Davis	Indiana
Sporting News	Ayo Dosunmu	Illinois	Evan Mobley	USC	Herbert Jones	Alabama
Sporting News	Luka Garza	Iowa	Jalen Suggs	Gonzaga	Davion Mitchell	Baylor
Sporting News	Corey Kispert	Gonzaga	Drew Timme	Gonzaga	Jeremiah Robinson-Earl	Villanova

AP Honorable Mention:

- Max Abmas, Oral Roberts
- Joël Ayayi, Gonzaga
- Alex Barcello, BYU
- Scottie Barnes, Florida State
- Charles Bassey, Western Kentucky
- James Bouknight, UConn
- Justin Champagnie, Pittsburgh
- Derek Culver, West Virginia
- Antoine Davis, Detroit Mercy
- Kendric Davis, SMU
- David Duke, Providence
- Collin Gillespie, Villanova
- RaiQuan Gray, Florida State
- Sam Hauser, Virginia
- Jay Huff, Virginia
- Nah'Shon Hyland, VCU
- Trayce Jackson-Davis, Indiana
- Andrew Jones, Texas
- Carlik Jones, Louisville
- E. J. Liddell, Ohio State
- Isaiah Livers, Michigan
- Sandro Mamukelashvili, Seton Hall
- JaQuori McLaughlin, UC Santa Barbara
- Tre Mann, Florida
- Remy Martin, Arizona State
- Miles McBride, West Virginia
- Mac McClung, Texas Tech
- Matt Mitchell, San Diego State
- Moses Moody, Arkansas
- Scotty Pippen Jr., Vanderbilt
- Neemias Queta, Utah State
- Austin Reaves, Oklahoma
- Jeremiah Robinson-Earl, Villanova
- Jaden Shackelford, Alabama
- Terry Taylor, Austin Peay
- MaCio Teague, Baylor
- Cameron Thomas, LSU
- Franz Wagner, Michigan
- Trevion Williams, Purdue
- McKinley Wright IV, Colorado
- Moses Wright, Georgia Tech
- Marcus Zegarowski, Creighton

== Academic All-Americans ==
The College Sports Information Directors of America (CoSIDA) announced its 15-member 2021 Academic All-America team on May 28, 2021, divided into first, second and third teams, with Corey Kispert of Gonzaga chosen as men's college basketball Academic All-American of the Year.

First Team
Player	School	Class	GPA and major
Corey Kispert	Gonzaga	GS	3.49/3.79, Business Administration
Max Abmas	Oral Roberts	Sr.	3.69, Biomedical Chemistry
Ian DuBose	Wake Forest	GS	3.84/3.80, Liberal Studies
Matt Pile (Note: Third team in 2018–19 and first team in 2019–20.)	Omaha	Sr.	3.95, Chemistry
Franz Wagner	Michigan	So.	4.00, Organizational Studies

Second Team
Player	School	Class	GPA and major
Charles Bassey	Western Kentucky	Jr.	3.57, Interdisciplinary Studies
Oscar da Silva	Stanford	Sr.	3.49, Biology
Cameron Krutwig	Loyola Chicago	Sr.	3.45, Entrepreneurship
Hunter Schofield	Dixie State	Sr.	3.94, Exercise Science
Ben Vander Plas	Ohio	GS	4.00/4.00, Sports Administration

Third Team
Player	School	Class	GPA and major
Tareq Coburn	Hofstra	Sr.	3.74, Community Health
Cam Davis	Navy	Sr.	3.46, Ocean Engineering
Matt Dentlinger	South Dakota State	Sr.	4.00, Mechanical Engineering
Brady Manek	Oklahoma	GS	3.63, Management (UG) / MBA (G)
Jeremiah Robinson-Earl	Villanova	So.	3.56, Communication
Luke Smith	Belmont	Sr.	3.65, Business Administration
Kobe Webster	Nebraska	GS	3.75/3.75, Educational Administration

== Senior All-Americans ==
The 10 finalists for the Senior CLASS Award, called Senior All-Americans, were announced on February 22, 2021. Luka Garza of Iowa was named the recipient on April 2, with the first and second teams also being announced at that time.

=== First team ===
Player	Position	School
Luka Garza	Center	Iowa
Manny Camper	Guard	Siena
Ross Cummings	Guard	Mercer
Marcus Garrett	Guard	Kansas
Corey Kispert	Forward	Gonzaga

=== Second team ===
Player	Position	School
Cam Davis	Guard	Navy
Collin Gillespie	Guard	Villanova
Cameron Krutwig	Center	Loyola Chicago
Oscar da Silva	Forward	Stanford
Justin Turner	Guard	Bowling Green
