= Jordan Murphy (basketball) =

American-Puerto Rican-Virgin Islander professional basketball player

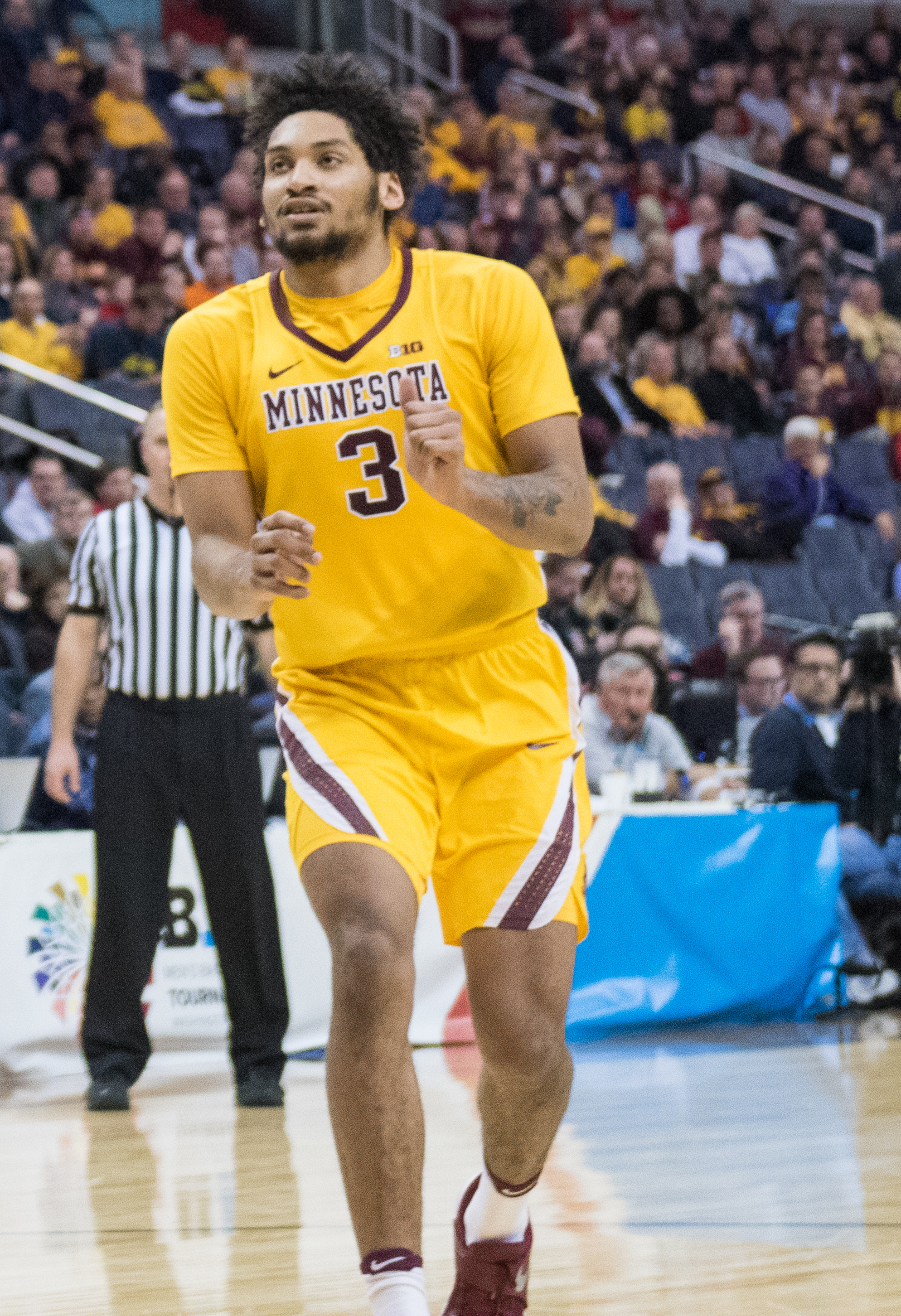
- Murphy playing for Minnesota

No. 3 – Barangay Ginebra San Miguel
- Position: Power forward
- League: PBA

Personal information
- Born: February 28, 1997 (age 29) San Antonio, Texas, U.S.
- Listed height: 6 ft 6 in (1.98 m)
- Listed weight: 250 lb (113 kg)

Career information
- High school: Central Catholic (San Antonio, Texas); Brennan (San Antonio, Texas)
- College: Minnesota (2015–2019)
- NBA draft: 2019: undrafted
- Playing career: 2019–present

Career history
- 2019–2020: Iowa Wolves
- 2020: Ironi Nes Ziona
- 2021: Iowa Wolves
- 2021: Leones de Ponce
- 2022: Austin Spurs
- 2022: Leones de Ponce
- 2022–2023: Austin Spurs
- 2023: Leones de Ponce
- 2023–2024: Greensboro Swarm
- 2024: Leones de Ponce
- 2024: Mexico City Capitanes
- 2025–2026: Leones de Ponce
- 2026–present: Barangay Ginebra San Miguel

Career highlights
- BSN Rookie of the Year (2021); First-team All-Big Ten (2019); Second-team All-Big Ten (2018); Third-team All-Big Ten (2017); Big Ten All-Freshman Team (2016)
- Stats at Basketball Reference

Jordan Bernard Murphy (born February 28, 1997) is a Puerto Rican-Virgin Islander professional basketball player for the Barangay Ginebra San Miguel of the Philippine Basketball Association (PBA). He was born in Texas and played college basketball for the Minnesota Golden Gophers. He is the all-time Golden Gopher career rebound and career double-double leader while ranking second in Big Ten history (to Jerry Lucas) in career rebounds.

== High school career ==
Murphy led his middle school to a 75–0 record. There was preseason speculation that he might start as a freshman who was at least 6 ft 4 in (1.93 m) for Central Catholic Marianist High School in November 2011. However, that December he came off the bench. As a senior, he helped William J. Brennan High School post a 31–3 record by averaging 23.6 points, 10.5 rebounds, 3.1 assists and 1.9 steals per game and earned Class 6A All-state recognition as a senior from the Texas Association of Basketball Coaches. Murphy committed to play for VCU on November 13, 2014. When VCU head coach Shaka Smart left VCU to coach Texas the following April, Murphy asked his successor Will Wade to be released from his commitment. Wade granted the release. At the time, Murphy already had interest from Oregon, UCLA, Gonzaga, and Miami. Minnesota invited him for a visit on May 11, after which he signed with Minnesota that Friday.

== College career ==
=== Freshman year ===
As a freshman for the 2015–16 team, Murphy was twice named Big Ten Conference Freshman of the week. His 24-point/10-rebound November 30, 2015, double-double against Clemson and his 19-point/17-rebound December 5 double-double against South Dakota were the first back-to-back double-doubles by a Minnesota freshman since Kris Humphries for the 2003–04 Gophers, which earned his first Big Ten Conference Freshman of the week on December 7. No Minnesota freshman had even posted a single double-double since Humphries and the 24 points was the highest total by a Minnesota freshman since Andre Hollins of the 2011–12 Gophers. The December 5 game included a Murphy tip in with one second remaining to send the game to overtime. On February 18, Murphy posted 18 points, 6 rebounds and 6 assists against number six ranked Maryland, helping 0–13 Minnesota earn its first conference win and earning his second Big Ten Conference Freshman of the week honor on February 22. Following the 2015–16 Big Ten Conference men's basketball season, he was named to the All-Freshman Big Ten team along with Thomas Bryant, Diamond Stone, Ethan Happ and Caleb Swanigan.

=== Sophomore year ===
As a sophomore, Murphy was Co-Big Ten Player of the Week (along with Derrick Walton) on February 13, 2017, following a 25-point/19-rebound/4-block double overtime performance against Iowa on February 8 and a 17-point/11-rebound effort on February 11 against Rutgers. After the 2016–17 Big Ten Conference men's basketball season, he was an All-Big Ten Conference third team selection by the Big Ten coaches and media. The national media recognized him as a second team Associated Press All-Big Ten selection.

=== Junior year ===
Although teammates Amir Coffey and Nate Mason were selected preseason All-Big Ten, Murphy was not. However, he was a Karl Malone Award preseason watchlist selectee. Murphy opened the season with a career-high 35 points and added 15 rebounds against USC Upstate. On the strength of seven consecutive double-doubles for the 2017–18 Minnesota Golden Gophers, he won the first three Big Ten Player of the Week awards (a feat last achieved by Evan Turner in the 2009–10 Big Ten Conference men's basketball season). On January 6, because of first half foul trouble Murphy needed nine second-half rebounds including one with eight seconds remaining against Indiana to tie Tim Duncan's NCAA record for most consecutive double-doubles to start a season (17). On January 10, Murphy's streak ended against Northwestern. Following the 2017–18 Big Ten Conference men's basketball regular season, Murphy was named an All-Big Ten second team selection by the media and third team selection by the coaches.

=== Senior year ===
Murphy was a preseason All-Big Ten selection by the Big Ten Media. Prior to the season he was one of nine Big Ten players named to the preseason John R. Wooden Award watchlist. Murphy was named MVP of the November Vancouver Showcase after averaging 15.7 points, 11.7 rebounds and 3.8 assists in wins over Texas A&M, Santa Clara and Washington. In the Santa Clara win on November 20, Murphy surpassed Mychal Thompson as the Minnesota Golden Gopher career rebound leader. Murphy tied Jim Brewer as the Minnesota all-time double-double producer with 24 points and 16 rebounds on November 30 against Oklahoma State and surpassed him two games later on December 5 with 18 points and 13 rebounds against Nebraska. On January 9, Murphy was one of seven Big Ten athletes included on the Wooden Award Men's Midseason Top 25 watchlist. On January 22, Murphy was one of four Big Ten athletes named to the Naismith Defensive Player of the Year Award Top 15 midseason watchlist. After leading Minnesota to a win over (#19/21 ranked) Iowa on January 27 with 23 points, 11 rebounds and 6 assists, he moved past Joe Barry Carroll into second place on the all-time Big Ten career rebound list (behind Jerry Lucas). On January 28, Murphy earned Co-Big Ten Player of the Week recognition, thus becoming the first Golden Gopher to earn five Big Ten Player of the Week recognitions.

On February 7, Murphy was one of two Big Ten athletes (along with Iggy Brazdeikis) named a Karl Malone Award Top 10 finalist. Following a pair of double-doubles against Nebraska and Indiana Murphy added a sixth Big Ten Player of the Week award on February 18. Following the season, he was a 2019 First team All-Big Ten selection by the media and second team selection by the coaches. On March 12, the U.S. Basketball Writers Association named Murphy to its 2018–19 Men's All-District V (OH, IN, IL, MI, MN, WI) Team, based upon voting from its national membership. He was named to the National Association of Basketball Coaches Division I All‐District 7 first team on March 21, as selected and voted on by member coaches of the NABC, making him eligible for the 2019 NABC Coaches’ Division I All-America team. He averaged 17.3 points and 9.3 rebounds in the 2019 Big Ten Conference men's basketball tournament, earning a spot on the All-tournament team. He led the Big Ten in rebounding average (11.0).

== Professional career ==
=== Iowa Wolves (2019–2020) ===
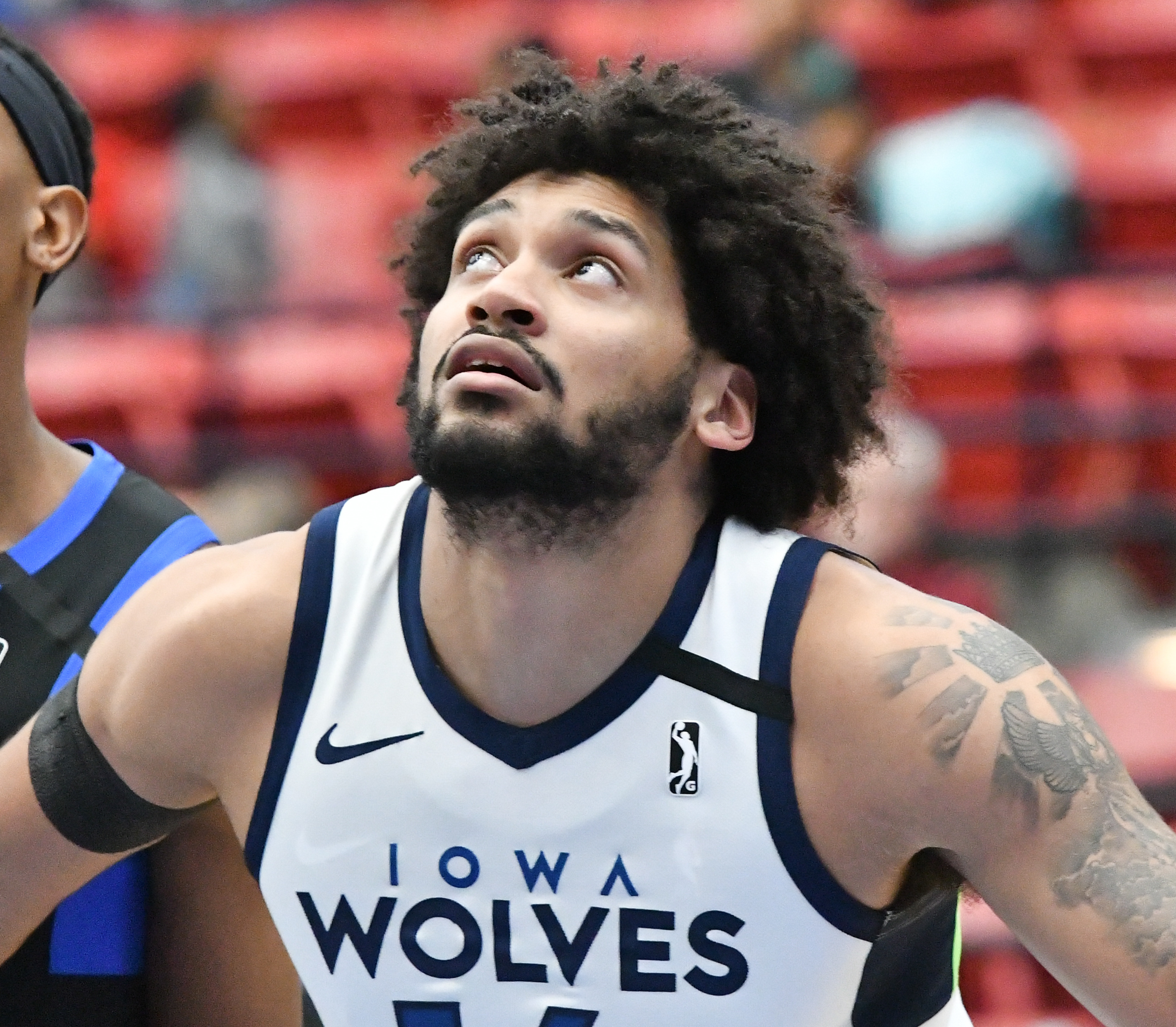
Murphy in 2020

After going undrafted in the 2019 NBA draft, Murphy signed an NBA Summer League contract with the Minnesota Timberwolves. On September 16, 2019, Murphy signed another contract with the Minnesota Timberwolves. He was released by the Timberwolves on October 14, 2019 and later added to the roster of their NBA G League affiliate, the Iowa Wolves. On January 2, 2020, Murphy posted 24 points on 10-of-15 shooting, 13 rebounds and two blocks in a 102–100 loss to the Northern Arizona Suns. Murphy averaged 9.6 points per game.

=== Ironi Nes Ziona (2020) ===
During the offseason, the Big Ten Network announced the results of the 24-person panel for its All-2010s Decade team for the Big Ten Conference. The panel named Murphy to the third team. On August 23, 2020, Murphy signed with Ironi Nes Ziona of the Israeli Premier League. During the 2020 Coronavirus lockdowns, his was one of twelve Israeli League teams that entered Balkan League competition to circumvent Knesset decision to shut down local athletic competition.

=== G League / Leones de Ponce (2021–2024) ===
Between 2021 and 2024 Murphy alternated assignments with NBA G League teams and Leones de Ponce of the BSN. Having returned to Iowa of the G League in February 2021, he signed with Leones de Ponce on April 11. He joined the Austin Spurs between January and March 2022 for the G League season, and between October 2022 and February 2023 for training camp; he returned to Leones de Ponce after each Spurs event concluded. On April 25, 2023, he was suspended for three months after he failed a doping test. On December 18, Murphy was acquired by the G League Greensboro Swarm in a trade with the Austin Spurs; he was however waived on January 19 of the following year.

After another stint with the Leones de Ponce, Murphy joined the Mexico City Capitanes on December 9, 2024. However, he was waived on December 27.

=== Barangay Ginebra San Miguel (2026–present) ===
On September 24, 2026, it was reported that Murphy was signed to be the import for the Barangay Ginebra San Miguel of the PBA, replacing Riley Grigsby.

== International career ==
Murphy represented the United States Virgin Islands under-17 national team at the 2013 Centrobasket U17 Championship. He posted several double doubles in this tournament: 10 points/10 rebounds in 68–64 loss to the Bahamas on August 14, 18 points/16 rebounds in a 90–84 win against Puerto Rico on August 15, 24 points/14 rebounds in a 78–58 win against Costa Rica on August 16, and 19 points/14 rebounds in an August 18 Bronze medal game 62–60 loss against Mexico.

On October 27, 2021, the Puerto Rican Basketball Federation announced that they had asked the Virgin Islands Basketball Federation for his release in order for him to be able to represent the Puerto Rican national basketball team in future competitions.

== Career statistics ==
Legend
GP	Games played	GS	Games started	MPG	Minutes per game
FG%	Field goal percentage	3P%	3-point field goal percentage	FT%	Free throw percentage
RPG	Rebounds per game	APG	Assists per game	SPG	Steals per game
BPG	Blocks per game	PPG	Points per game	**Bold**	Career high

=== College ===
Year	Team	GP	GS	MPG	FG%	3P%	FT%	RPG	APG	SPG	BPG	PPG
2015–16	Minnesota	31	20	26.5	.461	.220	.612	8.0	.7	1.0	1.0	11.6
2016–17	Minnesota	34	34	27.5	.502	.125	.615	8.8	.9	.7	**1.1**	11.3
2017–18	Minnesota	32	32	**31.8**	**.525**	**.314**	**.699**	**11.3**	1.4	**1.2**	1.0	**16.8**
2018–19	Minnesota	**36**	**36**	31.1	.487	.267	.683	11.0	**2.6**	.6	.8	14.4
Career		133	122	29.3	.495	.232	.659	9.8	1.4	.9	1.0	13.5
