= List of All-Big Ten Conference men's basketball teams =

The All-Big Ten men's basketball team is an annual Big Ten Conference honor bestowed on the best players in the conference following every college basketball season. Big Ten coaches and media, respectively, select three five-player teams designated as first, second, and third teams. The coaches' and media's choices are separate; a player might be named on the same team by both selectors, or be named to different teams, or selected by one and not the other.

== Selections ==
*	Named Big Ten Player of the Year that season
(C)	Named by coaches only
(M)	Named by media only

All selections are by both coaches and media, unless otherwise indicated.

Season	First team		Second team		Third team		Ref
Season	Players	Teams	Players	Teams	Players	Teams	Ref
2012–13	Victor Oladipo	Indiana	Tim Hardaway Jr. (M)	Michigan	Brandon Paul	Illinois	
2012–13	Cody Zeller	Indiana	Keith Appling (C)	Michigan State	D. J. Richardson (C)	Illinois	
2012–13	Trey Burke*	Michigan	Gary Harris	Michigan State	Christian Watford	Indiana	
2012–13	Tim Hardaway Jr. (C)	Michigan	Adreian Payne	Michigan State	Devyn Marble (C)	Iowa	
2012–13	Aaron Craft (M)	Ohio State	Trevor Mbakwe (M)	Minnesota	Aaron White (M)	Iowa	
2012–13	Deshaun Thomas	Ohio State	Aaron Craft (C)	Ohio State	Keith Appling (M)	Michigan State	
2012–13	N/A	N/A	Jared Berggren	Wisconsin	Andre Hollins (M)	Minnesota	
2012–13	N/A	N/A	N/A	N/A	Trevor Mbakwe (C)	Minnesota	
2012–13	N/A	N/A	N/A	N/A	Terone Johnson (C)	Purdue	
2013–14	Roy Devyn Marble	Iowa	Yogi Ferrell	Indiana	Noah Vonleh	Indiana	
2013–14	Nik Stauskas*	Michigan	Caris LeVert	Michigan	Aaron White	Iowa	
2013–14	Gary Harris	Michigan State	Adreian Payne	Michigan State	Drew Crawford (M)	Northwestern	
2013–14	Terran Petteway	Nebraska	Aaron Craft (M)	Ohio State	Aaron Craft (C)	Ohio State	
2013–14	Frank Kaminsky	Wisconsin	D.J. Newbill	Penn State	LaQuinton Ross (C)	Ohio State	
2013–14	N/A	N/A	Sam Dekker (C)	Wisconsin	Tim Frazier	Penn State	
2013–14	N/A	N/A	N/A	N/A	Sam Dekker (M)	Wisconsin	
2014–15	Yogi Ferrell	Indiana	Melo Trimble (C)	Maryland	Jarrod Uthoff (C)	Iowa	
2014–15	Aaron White	Iowa	Dez Wells (M)	Maryland	Jake Layman (M)	Maryland	
2014–15	Melo Trimble (M)	Maryland	Branden Dawson	Michigan State	Travis Trice	Michigan State	
2014–15	Dez Wells (C)	Maryland	D.J. Newbill	Penn State	Denzel Valentine	Michigan State	
2014–15	D'Angelo Russell	Ohio State	A. J. Hammons	Purdue	Terran Petteway	Nebraska	
2014–15	Frank Kaminsky*	Wisconsin	Sam Dekker	Wisconsin	Nigel Hayes	Wisconsin	
2015–16	Yogi Ferrell	Indiana	Malcolm Hill	Illinois	Thomas Bryant (C)	Indiana	
2015–16	Jarrod Uthoff	Iowa	Peter Jok	Iowa	Troy Williams	Indiana	
2015–16	Denzel Valentine*	Michigan State	Melo Trimble	Maryland	Diamond Stone	Maryland	
2015–16	A. J. Hammons	Purdue	Matt Costello (M)	Michigan State	Derrick Walton (C)	Michigan	
2015–16	Nigel Hayes	Wisconsin	Bryn Forbes	Michigan State	Matt Costello (C)	Michigan State	
2015–16	N/A	N/A	Shavon Shields (C)	Nebraska	Shavon Shields (M)	Nebraska	
2015–16	N/A	N/A	N/A	N/A	Brandon Taylor (M)	Penn State	
2015–16	N/A	N/A	N/A	N/A	Bronson Koenig (C)	Wisconsin	
2015–16	N/A	N/A	N/A	N/A	Ethan Happ (M)	Wisconsin	
2016–17	Peter Jok	Iowa	Malcolm Hill	Illinois	James Blackmon Jr. (M)	Indiana	
2016–17	Melo Trimble	Maryland	Derrick Walton	Michigan	Thomas Bryant	Indiana	
2016–17	Nate Mason	Minnesota	Miles Bridges	Michigan State	Jordan Murphy	Minnesota	
2016–17	Caleb Swanigan*	Purdue	Tai Webster (M)	Nebraska	Tai Webster (C)	Nebraska	
2016–17	Ethan Happ	Wisconsin	Bryant McIntosh	Northwestern	Scottie Lindsey (C)	Northwestern	
2016–17	N/A	N/A	Bronson Koenig (C)	Wisconsin	Vincent Edwards (M)	Purdue	
2016–17	N/A	N/A	N/A	N/A	Nigel Hayes	Wisconsin	
2016–17	N/A	N/A	N/A	N/A	Bronson Koenig (M)	Wisconsin	
2017–18	Miles Bridges	Michigan State	Juwan Morgan	Indiana	Anthony Cowan Jr.	Maryland	
2017–18	James Palmer Jr. (C)	Nebraska	Moritz Wagner	Michigan	Jaren Jackson Jr.	Michigan State	
2017–18	Keita Bates-Diop*	Ohio State	Jordan Murphy (M)	Minnesota	Nick Ward (M)	Michigan State	
2017–18	Tony Carr	Penn State	James Palmer Jr. (M)	Nebraska	Cassius Winston	Michigan State	
2017–18	Carsen Edwards	Purdue	Jae'Sean Tate (C)	Ohio State	Jordan Murphy (C)	Minnesota	
2017–18	Ethan Happ (M)	Wisconsin	Vincent Edwards	Purdue	Isaac Haas	Purdue	
2017–18	N/A	N/A	Ethan Happ (C)	Wisconsin	N/A	N/A	
2018–19	Bruno Fernando	Maryland	Romeo Langford (C)	Indiana	Jordan Bohannon (C)	Iowa	
2018–19	Cassius Winston*	Michigan State	Tyler Cook (M)	Iowa	Tyler Cook (C)	Iowa	
2018–19	Jordan Murphy (M)	Minnesota	Anthony Cowan Jr.	Maryland	Romeo Langford (M)	Indiana	
2018–19	Lamar Stevens (C)	Penn State	Ignas Brazdeikis	Michigan	Juwan Morgan (M)	Indiana	
2018–19	Carsen Edwards	Purdue	Zavier Simpson	Michigan	Nick Ward	Michigan State	
2018–19	Ethan Happ	Wisconsin	Jordan Murphy (C)	Minnesota	Amir Coffey	Minnesota	
2018–19	N/A	N/A	Lamar Stevens (M)	Penn State	James Palmer Jr.	Nebraska	
2019–20	Ayo Dosunmu (M)	Illinois	Ayo Dosunmu (C)	Illinois	Kofi Cockburn	Illinois	
2019–20	Luka Garza*	Iowa	Anthony Cowan Jr. (M)	Maryland	Trayce Jackson-Davis	Indiana	
2019–20	Anthony Cowan Jr. (C)	Maryland	Zavier Simpson	Michigan	Joe Wieskamp	Iowa	
2019–20	Jalen Smith	Maryland	Xavier Tillman	Michigan State	Marcus Carr (M)	Minnesota	
2019–20	Cassius Winston	Michigan State	Daniel Oturu	Minnesota	Geo Baker (C)	Rutgers	
2019–20	Lamar Stevens	Penn State	Kaleb Wesson	Ohio State	Nate Reuvers	Wisconsin	
2019–20	N/A	N/A	N/A	N/A	D'Mitrik Trice	Wisconsin	
2020–21	Kofi Cockburn	Illinois	Trayce Jackson-Davis (C)	Indiana	Franz Wagner (M)	Michigan	
2020–21	Ayo Dosunmu	Illinois	Joe Wieskamp	Iowa	Aaron Henry	Michigan State	
2020–21	Trayce Jackson-Davis (M)	Indiana	Hunter Dickinson (C)	Michigan	Marcus Carr (C)	Minnesota	
2020–21	Luka Garza*	Iowa	Isaiah Livers	Michigan	Duane Washington Jr.	Ohio State	
2020–21	Hunter Dickinson (M)	Michigan	Franz Wagner (C)	Michigan	Ron Harper Jr.	Rutgers	
2020–21	E. J. Liddell (C)	Ohio State	Marcus Carr (M)	Minnesota	D'Mitrik Trice	Wisconsin	
2020–21	Trevion Williams (C)	Purdue	E. J. Liddell (M)	Ohio State	N/A	N/A	
2020–21	N/A	N/A	Trevion Williams (M)	Purdue	N/A	N/A	
2021–22	Kofi Cockburn	Illinois	Trent Frazier	Illinois	Alfonso Plummer	Illinois	
2021–22	Keegan Murray	Iowa	Trayce Jackson-Davis	Indiana	Gabe Brown (C)	Michigan State	
2021–22	E. J. Liddell	Ohio State	Hunter Dickinson	Michigan	Bryce McGowens	Nebraska	
2021–22	Jaden Ivey	Purdue	Zach Edey	Purdue	Malaki Branham	Ohio State	
2021–22	Johnny Davis*	Wisconsin	Ron Harper Jr.	Rutgers	Trevion Williams	Purdue	
2021–22	N/A	N/A	Brad Davison (C)	Wisconsin	Geo Baker (C)	Rutgers	
2021–22	N/A	N/A	N/A	N/A	Brad Davison (M)	Wisconsin	
2022–23	Terrence Shannon Jr. (C)	Illinois	Terrence Shannon Jr. (M)	Illinois	Matthew Mayer	Illinois	
2022–23	Trayce Jackson-Davis	Indiana	Jalen Hood-Schifino (M)	Indiana	Jalen Hood-Schifino (C)	Indiana	
2022–23	Kris Murray	Iowa	Jahmir Young	Maryland	Filip Rebrača (M)	Iowa	
2022–23	Hunter Dickinson (M)	Michigan	Hunter Dickinson (C)	Michigan	Kobe Bufkin (C)	Michigan	
2022–23	Boo Buie (M)	Northwestern	Tyson Walker	Michigan State	Jett Howard (C)	Michigan	
2022–23	Jalen Pickett	Penn State	Derrick Walker (C)	Nebraska	A. J. Hoggard (M)	Michigan State	
2022–23	Zach Edey*	Purdue	Chase Audige (C)	Northwestern	Chase Audige (M)	Northwestern	
2022–23	N/A	N/A	Boo Buie (C)	Northwestern	Brice Sensabaugh (M)	Ohio State	
2022–23	N/A	N/A	Clifford Omoruyi (M)	Rutgers	Clifford Omoruyi (C)	Rutgers	
2023–24	Marcus Domask (C)	Illinois	Marcus Domask (M)	Illinois	Coleman Hawkins (M)	Illinois	
2023–24	Terrence Shannon Jr.	Illinois	Kel'el Ware (M)	Indiana	Kel'el Ware (C)	Indiana	
2023–24	Jahmir Young (M)	Maryland	Tony Perkins (C)	Iowa	Payton Sandfort	Iowa	
2023–24	Boo Buie	Northwestern	Jahmir Young (C)	Maryland	Dawson Garcia (C)	Minnesota	
2023–24	Zach Edey*	Purdue	Tyson Walker	Michigan State	Rienk Mast (C)	Nebraska	
2023–24	Braden Smith	Purdue	Dawson Garcia (M)	Minnesota	Keisei Tominaga (M)	Nebraska	
2023–24	N/A	N/A	Keisei Tominaga (C)	Nebraska	Bruce Thornton (M)	Ohio State	
2023–24	N/A	N/A	AJ Storr	Wisconsin	Brooks Barnhizer (C)	Northwestern	
2023–24	N/A	N/A	N/A	N/A	Ace Baldwin Jr.	Penn State	
2024–25	Trey Kaufman-Renn	Purdue	Danny Wolf	Michigan	Kasparas Jakučionis	Illinois	
2024–25	Braden Smith*	Purdue	Dawson Garcia	Minnesota	Ja'Kobi Gillespie	Maryland	
2024–25	Brice Williams	Nebraska	Nick Martinelli	Northwestern	Jase Richardson	Michigan State	
2024–25	John Tonje	Wisconsin	Bruce Thornton	Ohio State	Jaden Akins (C)	Michigan State	
2024–25	Derik Queen (C)	Maryland	Derik Queen (M)	Maryland	Nate Bittle (C)	Oregon	
2024–25	Vladislav Goldin (M)	Michigan	Vladislav Goldin (C)	Michigan	Jackson Shelstad (C)	Oregon	
2024–25	N/A	N/A	N/A	N/A	Ace Bailey (M)	Rutgers	
2024–25	N/A	N/A	N/A	N/A	Dylan Harper (M)	Rutgers	
2024–25	N/A	N/A	N/A	N/A	Tyler Bilodeau (C)	UCLA	
2025–26	Keaton Wagler	Illinois	Lamar Wilkerson (C)	Indiana	Lamar Wilkerson (M)	Indiana	
2025–26	Bennett Stirtz (M)	Iowa	Bennett Stirtz (C)	Iowa	Morez Johnson Jr. (C)	Michigan	
2025–26	Yaxel Lendeborg*	Michigan	Morez Johnson Jr. (M)	Michigan	Aday Mara	Michigan	
2025–26	Jeremy Fears Jr.	Michigan State	Pryce Sandfort (M)	Nebraska	Tyler Bilodeau	UCLA	
2025–26	Pryce Sandfort (C)	Nebraska	Nick Martinelli	Northwestern	Hannes Steinbach	Washington	
2025–26	Braden Smith	Purdue	Bruce Thornton	Ohio State	John Blackwell	Wisconsin	
2025–26	N/A	N/A	Nick Boyd	Wisconsin	N/A	N/A	
