= 2018–19 Rutgers Scarlet Knights men's basketball team =

American college basketball season

2018–19 Rutgers Scarlet Knights men's basketball
- Conference: Big Ten Conference
- Record: 14–17 (7–13 Big Ten)
- Head coach: Steve Pikiell (3rd season)
- Assistant coaches: Karl Hobbs; Brandin Knight; Jay Young
- Home arena: Louis Brown Athletic Center

2018–19 Big Ten Conference men's basketball standings
	Conf.				Overall
Team	W		L	PCT	W		L	PCT
No. 5 Michigan State †	16	–	4	.800	32	–	7	.821
No. 13 Purdue	16	–	4	.800	26	–	10	.722
No. 8 Michigan	15	–	5	.750	30	–	7	.811
No. 21 Wisconsin	14	–	6	.700	23	–	11	.676
Maryland	13	–	7	.650	23	–	11	.676
Iowa	10	–	10	.500	23	–	12	.657
Minnesota	9	–	11	.450	22	–	14	.611
Ohio State	8	–	12	.400	20	–	15	.571
Indiana	8	–	12	.400	19	–	16	.543
Penn State	7	–	13	.350	14	–	18	.438
Illinois	7	–	13	.350	12	–	21	.364
Rutgers	7	–	13	.350	14	–	17	.452
Nebraska	6	–	14	.300	19	–	17	.528
Northwestern	4	–	16	.200	13	–	19	.406
† 2019 Big Ten tournament winner Rankings from AP poll

The 2018–19 Rutgers Scarlet Knights men's basketball team represented Rutgers University–New Brunswick during the 2018–19 NCAA Division I men's basketball season. The Scarlet Knights, led by third-year head coach Steve Pikiell, played their home games at the Louis Brown Athletic Center in Piscataway, New Jersey as fifth-year members of the Big Ten Conference. The Knights finished the season 14–17, 7–13 in Big Ten play to finish in a three-way tie for 10th place. In the Big Ten tournament, they lost in the first round to Nebraska.

== Previous season ==
The Knights finished the 2017–18 season 15–19, 3–15 in Big Ten play to finish in last place. In the Big Ten tournament, they defeated Minnesota and Indiana before losing to Purdue in the semifinals.

== Offseason ==
=== Departures ===
Name	Number	Pos.	Height	Weight	Year	Hometown	Reason for departure
Candido Sá	1	F	6'9"	227	Senior	Lisbo, Portugal	Graduated
Corey Sanders	3	G	6'2"	181	Junior	Lakeland, FL	Declared for 2018 NBA draft
Mike Williams	5	G	6'2"	198	Senior	Brooklyn, NY	Graduated
Jake Dadika	10	G	6'0"	165	Senior	Milltown, NJ	Graduated
Matt Bullock	13	F	6'4"	260	Sophomore	Elizabeth, NJ	Transferred to California (PA)
Aaren Smith	24	F	6'6"	211	Sophomore	Ellicott City, MD	Transferred to District of Columbia
Deshawn Freeman	33	F	6'7"	225	RS Senior	Rocky Mount, NC	Graduated
Souf Mensah	44	G	6'2"	210	Junior	Nantes, France	Play professional basketball in France

=== Incoming transfers ===
Name	Number	Pos.	Height	Weight	Year	Hometown	Previous School
Shaq Carter	13	F	6'9"	240	Junior	Deerfield Beach, FL	Eastern Florida State College
Jacob Young	42	G	6'2"	185	Junior	Houston, TX	Texas

=== 2018 recruiting class ===
College recruiting information
Name	Hometown	School	Height	Weight	Commit date
Montez Mathis #20 SG	Essex, MD	John Carroll School	6 ft 4 in (1.93 m)	190 lb (86 kg)	Aug 4, 2017
Montez Mathis #20 SG	Recruit ratings: Scout: Rivals: 247Sports: ESPN:				
Ron Harper Jr. SG	Franklin Lakes, NJ	Don Bosco Preparatory High School	6 ft 6 in (1.98 m)	200 lb (91 kg)	Aug 11, 2017
Ron Harper Jr. SG	Recruit ratings: Scout: Rivals: 247Sports: ESPN:				
Caleb McConnell; SG	Dayton, OH	Dunbar High School	6 ft 4 in (1.93 m)	185 lb (84 kg)	Apr 15, 2018
Caleb McConnell; SG	Recruit ratings: Scout: Rivals: 247Sports: ESPN:				
Overall recruit ranking:
Note: In many cases, Scout, Rivals, 247Sports, On3, and ESPN may conflict in their listings of height and weight.; In these cases, the average was taken. ESPN grades are on a 100-point scale.; Sources: "2018 Team Ranking". Rivals.

== Roster ==
2018–19 Rutgers Scarlet Knights men's basketball team
Players
Coaches

Pos.	#	Name	Height	Weight	Year	Previous school	Hometown
G	0	Geo Baker	6 ft 4 in (1.93 m)	180 lb (82 kg)	So	Proctor Academy	Derry, NH
C	2	Shaquille Doorson	7 ft 0 in (2.13 m)	275 lb (125 kg)	RS Sr	Canarias Basketball Academy	Amsterdam, Netherlands
F	5	Eugene Omoruyi	6 ft 6 in (1.98 m)	234 lb (106 kg)	Jr	Orangeville Prep	Rexdale, Canada
G	10	Joey Downes	5 ft 11 in (1.8 m)	165 lb (75 kg)	RS So	East Sandwich/Bridgton Academy	East Sandwich, MA
F/C	11	Mamadou Doucoure	6 ft 9 in (2.06 m)	243 lb (110 kg)	So	Our Savior New American School	Bamako, Mali
F	13	Shaq Carter	6 ft 9 in (2.06 m)	245 lb (111 kg)	Jr	Zion Lutheran High School; Eastern Florida State	Hollywood, FL
F/C	15	Myles Johnson	6 ft 10 in (2.08 m)	245 lb (111 kg)	RS Fr	Long Beach Poly	Long Beach, CA
G	22	Caleb McConnell	6 ft 6 in (1.98 m)	190 lb (86 kg)	Fr	SPIRE Institute	Jacksonville, FL
G	23	Montez Mathis	6 ft 4 in (1.93 m)	200 lb (91 kg)	Fr	The John Carroll School	Baltimore, MD
G/F	24	Ron Harper Jr.	6 ft 6 in (1.98 m)	230 lb (104 kg)	Fr	Don Bosco Prep	Franklin Lakes, NJ
G	32	Peter Kiss	6 ft 5 in (1.96 m)	200 lb (91 kg)	RS So	Notre Dame Prep; Qunnipiac	New York City, NY
F	35	Issa Thiam	6 ft 9 in (2.06 m)	190 lb (86 kg)	Jr	Canarias Basketball Academy	Dakar, Senegal
G	42	Jacob Young (redshirt)	6 ft 2 in (1.88 m)	185 lb (84 kg)	Jr	Yates; Texas	Houston, TX
F/C	55	Luke Nathan (W)	6 ft 10 in (2.08 m)	235 lb (107 kg)	So	Randolph	Randolph, NJ

Head coach

- Steve Pikiell (Connecticut)

Assistant coach(es)

- Karl Hobbs (Connecticut)
- Brandin Knight (Pittsburgh)
- Jay Young (Marist)

Legend

- (C) Team captain
- (S) Suspended
- (I) Ineligible
- (W) Walk-on
- Injured
- Current redshirt

Roster

== Schedule and results ==
Date time, TV	Rank^{#}	Opponent^{#}	Result	Record	High points	High rebounds	High assists	Site (attendance) city, state
Regular season
November 9, 2018*; 7:00 pm, BTN Plus		Fairleigh Dickinson	W 90–55	1–0	17 – Kiss	10 – Omoruyi	7 – Baker	Louis Brown Athletic Center (5,521); Piscataway, NJ
November 11, 2018*; 3:00 pm, BTN Plus		Drexel	W 95–67	2–0	24 – Omoruyi	10 – Omoruyi	6 – Baker	Louis Brown Athletic Center (4,214); Piscataway, NJ
November 16, 2018*; 7:00 pm, BTN		St. John's; Gavitt Tipoff Games	L 65–84	2–1	13 – Thiam	7 – Tied	5 – Baker	Louis Brown Athletic Center (7,102); Piscataway, NJ
November 19, 2018*; 7:00 pm, BTN		Eastern Michigan	W 63–36	3–1	20 – Baker	7 – Tied	6 – Thiam	Louis Brown Athletic Center (4,473); Piscataway, NJ
November 23, 2018*; 2:00 pm, BTN Plus		Boston University	W 54–44	4–1	20 – Omoruyi	17 – Omoruyi	2 – Baker	Louis Brown Athletic Center (5,032); Piscataway, NJ
November 28, 2018*; 7:00 pm, ESPNU		at Miami (FL); ACC–Big Ten Challenge	W 57–54	5–1	16 – Baker	10 – Doorson	6 – Baker	Watsco Center (6,376); Coral Gables, FL
November 30, 2018; 6:00 pm, BTN		No. 9 Michigan State	L 67–78	5–2 (0–1)	16 – Omoruyi	11 – Omoruyi	3 – Baker	Louis Brown Athletic Center (8,000); Piscataway, NJ
December 3, 2018; 8:00 pm, BTN		at No. 12 Wisconsin	L 64–69	5–3 (0–2)	17 – Omoruyi	8 – Omoruyi	4 – Kiss	Kohl Center (17,082); Madison, WI
December 8, 2018*; 2:30 pm, CBSSN		at Fordham	L 70–78	5–4	19 – Omoruyi	11 – Omoruyi	6 – Baker	Rose Hill Gymnasium (2,346); Bronx, NY
December 15, 2018*; 2:00 pm, FS1		at Seton Hall; Rivalry/Garden State Hardwood Classic	L 66–72	5–5	16 – Kiss	12 – Doorson	5 – Baker	Prudential Center (10,481); Newark, NJ
December 22, 2018*; 1:00 pm, BTN Plus		Columbia	W 68–65	6–5	18 – Omoruyi	8 – Doorson	5 – Baker	Louis Brown Athletic Center (5,231); Piscataway, NJ
December 29, 2018*; 3:00 pm, BTN Plus		Maine	W 70–55	7–5	17 – Omoruyi	10 – Johnson	9 – Baker	Louis Brown Athletic Center (5,401); Piscataway, NJ
January 5, 2019; 2:00 pm, BTN		Maryland	L 63-77	7–6 (0–3)	12 – Omoruyi	8 – Mathis	3 – Mathis	Louis Brown Athletic Center (8,000); Piscataway, NJ
January 9, 2019; 7:00 pm, BTN		No. 16 Ohio State	W 64–61	8–6 (1–3)	16 – Mathis	7 – Carter	4 – Baker	Louis Brown Athletic Center (5,379); Piscataway, NJ
January 12, 2019; 12:30 pm, BTN		at Minnesota	L 70–88	8–7 (1–4)	13 – Tied	8 – Johnson	2 – Tied	Williams Arena (10,837); Minneapolis, MN
January 15, 2019; 7:00 pm, BTN		at Purdue	L 54–89	8–8 (1–5)	19 – Mathis	7 – Carter	5 – McConnell	Mackey Arena (14,804); West Lafayette, IN
January 18, 2019; 7:00 pm, BTN		Northwestern	L 57–65	8–9 (1–6)	16 – Mathis	10 – Carter	4 – Baker	Louis Brown Athletic Center (5,459); Piscataway, NJ
January 21, 2019; 8:00 pm, BTN		Nebraska	W 76–69	9–9 (2–6)	20 – Mathis	11 – Johnson	4 – Johnson	Louis Brown Athletic Center (5,022); Piscataway, NJ
January 26, 2019; 4:30 pm, BTN		at Penn State	W 64–60	10–9 (3–6)	20 – Baker	7 – Carter	3 – Baker	Bryce Jordan Center (13,366); University Park, PA
January 30, 2019; 7:00 pm, BTN		Indiana	W 66–58	11–9 (4–6)	16 – Baker	10 – Omoruyi	5 – Baker	Louis Brown Athletic Center (5,973); Piscataway, NJ
February 2, 2019; 12:00 pm, BTN		at Ohio State	L 62–76	11–10 (4–7)	19 – Omoruyi	8 – Tied	6 – Omoruyi	Value City Arena (14,961); Columbus, OH
February 5, 2019; 8:00 pm, BTN		No. 7 Michigan	L 65–77	11–11 (4–8)	21 – Omoruyi	8 – Baker	5 – Mathis	Louis Brown Athletic Center (8,000); Piscataway, NJ
February 9, 2019; 4:00 pm, BTN		at Illinois	L 94–99 ^{OT}	11–12 (4–9)	25 – McConnell	11 – Omoruyi	5 – Omoruyi	State Farm Center (14,099); Champaign, IL
February 13, 2019; 7:00 pm, BTN		at Northwestern	W 59–56	12–12 (5–9)	12 – Tied	7 – Omoruyi	5 – Baker	Welsh–Ryan Arena (6,474); Evanston, IL
February 16, 2019; 6:00 pm, FS1		No. 21 Iowa	L 69–71	12–13 (5–10)	16 – Harper Jr.	11 – Omoruyi	6 – Baker	Louis Brown Athletic Center (8,000); Piscataway, NJ
February 20, 2019; 6:30 pm, BTN		at No. 10 Michigan State	L 60–71	12–14 (5–11)	17 – Baker	8 – Omoruyi	6 – Baker	Breslin Center (14,797); East Lansing, MI
February 24, 2019; 5:30 pm, BTN		Minnesota	W 68–64	13–14 (6–11)	18 – Mathis	9 – Omoruyi	3 – Baker	Louis Brown Athletic Center (7,270); Piscataway, NJ
March 2, 2019; 5:00 pm, BTN		at No. 22 Iowa	W 86–72	14–14 (7–11)	27 – Harper Jr.	6 – Baker	9 – Baker	Carver–Hawkeye Arena (15,056); Iowa City, IA
March 6, 2019; 7:00 pm, BTN		Penn State	L 65-66	14–15 (7–12)	23 – Omoruyi	11 – Johnson	3 – Tied	Louis Brown Athletic Center (8,000); Piscataway, NJ
March 10, 2019; 12:00 pm, BTN		at Indiana	L 73-89	14–16 (7–13)	18 – Omoruyi	8 – Johnson	3 – Johnson/McConnell	Simon Skjodt Assembly Hall; Bloomington, IN
Big Ten tournament
March 13, 2019*; 5:30PM, BTN	(12)	vs. (13) Nebraska; First round	L 61–68	14–17	16 – Omoruyi	11 – Johnson	5 – Omoruyi	United Center (16,473); Chicago, IL
*Non-conference game. ^{#}Rankings from AP Poll. (#) Tournament seedings in parentheses. All times are in Eastern Time.
