= 2018–19 Maryland Terrapins men's basketball team =

American college basketball season

2018–19 Maryland Terrapins men's basketball
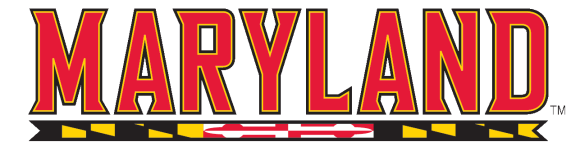

NCAA tournament, Second Round
- Conference: Big Ten Conference

Ranking
- Coaches: No. 22
- Record: 23–11 (13–7 Big Ten)
- Head coach: Mark Turgeon (8th season)
- Assistant coaches: Matt Brady; Kevin Broadus; Bino Ranson
- Home arena: Xfinity Center

2018–19 Big Ten Conference men's basketball standings
	Conf.				Overall
Team	W		L	PCT	W		L	PCT
No. 5 Michigan State †	16	–	4	.800	32	–	7	.821
No. 13 Purdue	16	–	4	.800	26	–	10	.722
No. 8 Michigan	15	–	5	.750	30	–	7	.811
No. 21 Wisconsin	14	–	6	.700	23	–	11	.676
Maryland	13	–	7	.650	23	–	11	.676
Iowa	10	–	10	.500	23	–	12	.657
Minnesota	9	–	11	.450	22	–	14	.611
Ohio State	8	–	12	.400	20	–	15	.571
Indiana	8	–	12	.400	19	–	16	.543
Penn State	7	–	13	.350	14	–	18	.438
Illinois	7	–	13	.350	12	–	21	.364
Rutgers	7	–	13	.350	14	–	17	.452
Nebraska	6	–	14	.300	19	–	17	.528
Northwestern	4	–	16	.200	13	–	19	.406
† 2019 Big Ten tournament winner Rankings from AP poll

The 2018–19 Maryland Terrapins men's basketball team represented the University of Maryland, College Park in the 2018–19 NCAA Division I men's basketball season. They were led by eighth-year head coach Mark Turgeon, and played their home games at Xfinity Center in College Park, Maryland, as members of the Big Ten Conference. They finished the season 23–11, 13–7 in Big Ten play to finish in fifth place. They lost in the second round of the Big Ten tournament to Nebraska. They received an at-large bid to the NCAA tournament as the No. 6 seed in the East region. There they defeated Belmont before losing to LSU in the second round.

== Previous season ==
The Terrapins finished the 2017–18 season 19–13, 8–10 in Big Ten play to finish in eighth place. They lost in the second round of the Big Ten tournament to Wisconsin. They were invited to the College Basketball Invitational, but declined, marking their absence in a postseason tournament for the first time since 2014.

== Offseason ==
=== Departures ===
On April 6, 2018, freshman forward Bruno Fernando announced he would test the NBA draft, but not sign with an agent. On May 28, he announced he would return to school. Sophomore guard Kevin Huerter declared for the NBA draft on April 20, 2018, but also announced he would not sign with an agent. On May 30, he announced he would stay in the draft and hire an agent, thereby ending his college career.

Name	Number	Pos.	Height	Weight	Year	Hometown	Reason for departure
Sean Obi	0	F	6'9"	250	RS senior	Kaduna, Nigeria	Graduated
Kevin Huerter	4	G	6'7"	190	Sophomore	Clifton Park, NY	Declared for the 2018 NBA draft; selected 19th overall by the Atlanta Hawks
Dion Wiley	5	G	6'4"	210	RS junior	Oxon Hill, MD	Transferred to Saint Louis
Jared Nickens	11	G/F	6'7"	205	Senior	Monmouth Junction, NJ	Graduated
Michal Čekovský	15	F	7'1"	250	Senior	Košice, Slovakia	Graduated
Justin Jackson	21	F	6'7"	225	Sophomore	Toronto, ON	Declared for the 2018 NBA draft; selected 43rd overall by the Denver Nuggets
Alex Tostado	25	G	6'2"	178	Freshman	Guadalajara, Mexico	Left team

=== Recruiting class ===
==== 2018 recruiting class ====
College recruiting
Name	Hometown	School	Height	Weight	Commit date
Jalen Smith; PF	Baltimore, MD	Mount Saint Joseph High School	6 ft 10 in (2.08 m)	195 lb (88 kg)	Jun 26, 2017
Jalen Smith; PF	Recruit ratings: Scout: Rivals: 247Sports: ESPN:				
Aaron Wiggins; SF	High Point, NC	Wesleyan Christian Academy	6 ft 6 in (1.98 m)	180 lb (82 kg)	Jun 3, 2017
Aaron Wiggins; SF	Recruit ratings: Scout: Rivals: 247Sports: ESPN:				
Eric Ayala; PG	Wilmington, DE	IMG Academy	6 ft 5 in (1.96 m)	180 lb (82 kg)	Oct 14, 2017
Eric Ayala; PG	Recruit ratings: Scout: Rivals: 247Sports: ESPN:				
Serrel Smith Jr. SG	St. Petersburg, FL	St. Petersburg High School	6 ft 3 in (1.91 m)	170 lb (77 kg)	Apr 11, 2018
Serrel Smith Jr. SG	Recruit ratings: Scout: Rivals: 247Sports: ESPN:				
Ricky Lindo Jr. SF	Washington, DC	Woodrow Wilson High School	6 ft 8 in (2.03 m)	205 lb (93 kg)	Aug 15, 2018
Ricky Lindo Jr. SF	Recruit ratings: Scout: Rivals: 247Sports: ESPN:				
Trace Ramsey; SF	Crown Point, IN	Don Bosco Prep Academy	6 ft 7 in (2.01 m)	200 lb (91 kg)	Apr 26, 2018
Trace Ramsey; SF	Recruit ratings: Scout: Rivals: 247Sports: ESPN:				
Overall recruit ranking:
Note: In many cases, Scout, Rivals, 247Sports, On3, and ESPN may conflict in their listings of height and weight.; In these cases, the average was taken. ESPN grades are on a 100-point scale.; Sources: "2018 Maryland Commits". Rivals.; "2018 Team Ranking". Rivals.

== Roster ==
2018–19 Maryland Terrapins men's basketball team
Players
Coaches

Pos.	#	Name	Height	Weight	Year	Previous school	Hometown
F	0	Joshua Tomaic	6 ft 9 in (2.06 m)	235 lb (107 kg)	RS So	Canarias Basketball Academy	Lanzarote, Canary Islands
G	1	Anthony Cowan Jr.	6 ft 0 in (1.83 m)	170 lb (77 kg)	Jr	St. John's College High School	Bowie, Maryland
G	2	Aaron Wiggins	6 ft 6 in (1.98 m)	200 lb (91 kg)	Fr	Wesleyan Christian Academy	Greensboro, North Carolina
G	4	Andrew Terrell (W)	5 ft 10 in (1.78 m)	190 lb (86 kg)	Sr	Brebeuf Jesuit Prep	Indianapolis, Indiana
G	5	Eric Ayala	6 ft 5 in (1.96 m)	205 lb (93 kg)	Fr	IMG Academy	Wilmington, Delaware
G	10	Serrel Smith Jr.	6 ft 4 in (1.93 m)	170 lb (77 kg)	Fr	St. Petersburg High School	St. Petersburg, Florida
G	11	Darryl Morsell	6 ft 5 in (1.96 m)	200 lb (91 kg)	So	Mount Saint Joseph High School	Baltimore, Maryland
G	12	Reese Mona (W)	6 ft 2 in (1.88 m)	180 lb (82 kg)	So	St. John's College High School	La Plata, Maryland
F	13	Ivan Bender	6 ft 9 in (2.06 m)	228 lb (103 kg)	Sr	Elektrotehnička Škola Tuzla	Čapljina, Bosnia and Herzegovina
F	14	Ricky Lindo Jr.	6 ft 8 in (2.03 m)	200 lb (91 kg)	Fr	Woodrow Wilson High School	Washington, D.C.
F	15	Will Clark (W)	6 ft 8 in (2.03 m)	195 lb (88 kg)	Jr	Loyola Blakefield	Baltimore, Maryland
G	20	Travis Valmon (W)	6 ft 1 in (1.85 m)	175 lb (79 kg)	Jr	Georgetown Prep	Rockville, Maryland
F	23	Bruno Fernando	6 ft 10 in (2.08 m)	240 lb (109 kg)	So	IMG Academy	Luanda, Angola
F	24	Trace Ramsey	6 ft 7 in (2.01 m)	200 lb (91 kg)	Fr	Bosco Institute	Valparaiso, Indiana
F	25	Jalen Smith	6 ft 10 in (2.08 m)	215 lb (98 kg)	Fr	Mount Saint Joseph High School	Baltimore, Maryland

Head coach

- Mark Turgeon (Kansas)

Assistant coach(es)

- Matt Brady (Siena)
- Kevin Broadus (Bowie State)
- Bino Ranson (Southern New Hampshire)

Legend

- (C) Team captain
- (S) Suspended
- (I) Ineligible
- (W) Walk-on
- Injured
- Current redshirt

Roster

=== Depth chart ===
Pos.	Starting 5	Bench 1	Bench 2
C	Bruno Fernando	Joshua Tomaic	Ivan Bender
PF	Jalen Smith	Ricky Lindo
SF	Darryl Morsell	Serrel Smith Jr.
SG	Anthony Cowan Jr.	Aaron Wiggins
PG	Eric Ayala	Reese Mona

== Schedule and results ==
The season marked the first time in Big Ten history that the teams played a 20-game conference schedule, setting a precedent for all Division I basketball. The new schedule also included a regional component to increase the frequency of games among teams in similar areas. Over the course of a six-year cycle (12 playing opportunities), in-state rivals play each other 12 times, regional opponents play 10 times, and all other teams play nine times. Three in-state series are guaranteed home-and-homes: Illinois and Northwestern, Indiana and Purdue, and Michigan and Michigan State will always play twice. The conference opponent list was released on April 19, 2018.

Date time, TV	Rank^{#}	Opponent^{#}	Result	Record	High points	High rebounds	High assists	Site (attendance) city, state
Exhibition
October 30, 2018*; 7:00 pm, BTN Plus		Lynn	W 100–67	–	22 – J. Smith	11 – Fernando	6 – Cowan	Xfinity Center (N/A); College Park, MD
Regular season
November 6, 2018*; 7:30 pm, BTN Plus		Delaware	W 73–67	1–0	19 – J. Smith	13 – J. Smith	5 – Ayala	Xfinity Center (12,703); College Park, MD
November 9, 2018*; 8:30 pm, CBSSN		at Navy; Veterans Classic	W 78–57	2–0	24 – Cowan Jr.	10 – Fernando	6 – Cowan Jr.	Alumni Hall (5,710); Annapolis, MD
November 12, 2018*; 7:00 pm, ESPNU		North Carolina A&T	W 82–59	3–0	17 – Fernando	12 – Fernando	5 – Ayala	Xfinity Center (10,958); College Park, MD
November 16, 2018*; 7:00 pm, BTN Plus		Hofstra	W 80–69	4–0	17 – Fernando	7 – Tied	4 – Tied	Xfinity Center (12,346); College Park, MD
November 18, 2018*; 4:00 pm, BTN		Mount Saint Mary's	W 92–77	5–0	21 – Fernando	10 – J. Smith	6 – Tied	Xfinity Center (11,782); College Park, MD
November 23, 2018*; 6:00 pm, BTN		Marshall	W 104–67	6–0	26 – Cowan Jr.	16 – Fernando	6 – Cowan Jr.	Xfinity Center (11,711); College Park, MD
November 28, 2018*; 7:30 pm, ESPN	No. 24	No. 4 Virginia; ACC–Big Ten Challenge	L 71–76	6–1	15 – Cowan Jr.	11 – Fernando	4 – Cowan Jr.	Xfinity Center (17,950); College Park, MD
December 1, 2018; 5:00 pm, BTN	No. 24	Penn State	W 66–59	7–1 (1–0)	16 – J. Smith	13 – Fernando	4 – Cowan Jr.	Xfinity Center (15,481); College Park, MD
December 6, 2018; 7:00 pm, BTN	No. 23	at Purdue	L 60–62	7–2 (1–1)	18 – Cowan Jr.	13 – Fernando	6 – Cowan Jr.	Mackey Arena (14,242); West Lafayette, IN
December 8, 2018*; 4:00 pm, BTN	No. 23	vs. Loyola–Chicago; Baltimore Showcase	W 55–41	8–2 (1–1)	17 – Cowan Jr.	6 – Wiggins	4 – Cowan Jr.	Royal Farms Arena (3,640); Baltimore, MD
December 11, 2018*; 7:00 pm, BTN		Loyola (MD)	W 94–71	9–2 (1–1)	23 – Cowan Jr.	8 – J. Smith	7 – Ayala	Xfinity Center (11,595); College Park, MD
December 22, 2018*; 5:30 pm, FS1		Seton Hall	L 74–78	9–3	19 – Fernando	10 – Fernando	5 – Ayala	Xfinity Center (12,555); College Park, MD
December 29, 2018*; 6:00 pm, ESPNU		Radford	W 78–64	10–3	19 – Fernando	12 – Fernando	5 – Cowan Jr.	Xfinity Center (13,608); College Park, MD
January 2, 2019; 6:30 pm, BTN		No. 24 Nebraska	W 74–72	11–3 (2–1)	19 – Cowan Jr.	17 – Fernando	4 – Cowan Jr.	Xfinity Center (11,251); College Park, MD
January 5, 2019; 2:00 pm, BTN		at Rutgers	W 77–63	12–3 (3–1)	16 – J. Smith	9 – Fernando	5 – Fernando	Louis Brown Athletic Center (8,000); Piscataway, NJ
January 8, 2019; 7:00 pm, BTN		at Minnesota	W 82–67	13–3 (4–1)	27 – Cowan Jr.	11 – Fernando	5 – Cowan Jr.	Williams Arena (9,919); Minneapolis, MN
January 11, 2019; 7:00 pm, FS1		No. 22 Indiana	W 78–75	14–3 (5–1)	25 – Fernando	13 – Fernando	7 – Cowan Jr.	Xfinity Center (15,017); College Park, MD
January 14, 2019; 8:30 pm, FS1	No. 19	Wisconsin	W 64–60	15–3 (6–1)	21 – Cowan Jr.	7 – J. Smith	3 – Cowan Jr.	Xfinity Center (12,894); College Park, MD
January 18, 2019; 6:30 pm, FS1	No. 19	at Ohio State	W 75–61	16–3 (7–1)	20 – Cowan Jr.	14 – Fernando	6 – Cowan Jr.	Value City Arena (14,716); Columbus, OH
January 21, 2019; 6:30 pm, FS1	No. 13	at No. 6 Michigan State	L 55–69	16–4 (7–2)	15 – Wiggins	13 – Fernando	5 – Cowan Jr.	Breslin Center (14,797); East Lansing, MI
January 26, 2019; 12:00 pm, BTN	No. 13	vs. Illinois; B1G Super Saturday	L 67–78	16–5 (7–3)	19 – Fernando	10 – Fernando	5 – Cowan Jr.	Madison Square Garden (7,239); New York, NY
January 29, 2019; 6:30 pm, FS1	No. 21	Northwestern	W 70–52	17–5 (8–3)	22 – Fernando	11 – Fernando	4 – Tied	Xfinity Center (15,310); College Park, MD
February 1, 2019; 9:00 pm, FS1	No. 21	at No. 24 Wisconsin	L 61–69	17–6 (8–4)	18 – Ayala	10 – Fernando	3 – Cowan Jr.	Kohl Center (17,287); Madison, WI
February 6, 2019; 7:00 pm, BTN	No. 24	at Nebraska	W 60–45	18–6 (9–4)	18 – J. Smith	19 – Fernando	4 – Cowan Jr.	Pinnacle Bank Arena (15,552); Lincoln, NE
February 12, 2019; 6:30 pm, BTN	No. 24	No. 12 Purdue	W 70–56	19–6 (10–4)	16 – J. Smith	12 – Fernando	6 – Cowan Jr.	Xfinity Center (14,813); College Park, MD
February 16, 2019; 12:00 pm, FOX	No. 24	at No. 6 Michigan	L 52–65	19–7 (10–5)	15 – Wiggins	8 – Fernando	3 – Wiggins	Crisler Center (12,707); Ann Arbor, MI
February 19, 2019; 8:00 pm, BTN	No. 24	at No. 21 Iowa	W 66–65	20–7 (11–5)	17 – Cowan Jr.	11 – Fernando	8 – Cowan Jr.	Carver–Hawkeye Arena (11,986); Iowa City, IA
February 23, 2019; 2:00 pm, ESPN	No. 24	Ohio State	W 72–62	21–7 (12–5)	19 – Cowan Jr.	10 – Fernando	4 – Tied	Xfinity Center (17,569); College Park, MD
February 27, 2019; 6:30 pm, BTN	No. 17	at Penn State	L 61–78	21–8 (12–6)	15 – Cowan	8 – Fernando	2 – Tied	Bryce Jordan Center (9,020); University Park, PA
March 3, 2019; 3:45 pm, CBS	No. 17	No. 9 Michigan	L 62–69	21–9 (12–7)	12 – Fernando	6 – Fernando	4 – Morsell	Xfinity Center (17,950); College Park, MD
March 8, 2019; 6:30 pm, FS1	No. 24	Minnesota	W 69–60	22–9 (13–7)	21 – Cowan Jr.	11 – Smith	5 – Cowan Jr.	Xfinity Center (16,662); College Park, MD
Big Ten tournament
March 14, 2019; 2:55 pm, BTN	(5) No. 21	vs. (13) Nebraska; Second Round	L 61–69	22–10	18 – Cowan	8 – Fernando	5 – Morsell	United Center (16,207); Chicago, IL
NCAA Tournament
March 21, 2019*; 3:10 pm, truTV	(6 E)	vs. (11 E) Belmont; First Round	W 79–77	23–10	19 – J. Smith	13 – Fernando	6 – Cowan Jr.	VyStar Veterans Memorial Arena (12,429); Jacksonville, FL
March 23, 2019*; 12:15 pm, CBS	(6 E)	vs. (3 E) No. 12 LSU; Second Round	L 67–69	23–11	15 – Smith	15 – Fernando	6 – Cowan Jr.	VyStar Veterans Memorial Arena (14,250); Jacksonville, FL
*Non-conference game. ^{#}Rankings from AP Poll. (#) Tournament seedings in parentheses. E=East. All times are in Eastern Time.

== Awards and honors ==
- Bruno Fernando

First Team All-Big Ten (coaches/media)
Big-Ten All-Defensive Team

- Anthony Cowan Jr.

Preseason All-Big Ten team
Second Team All-Big Ten (coaches/media)

- Jalen Smith

Big Ten All-Freshman Team

== Rankings ==
Ranking movements Legend: ██ Increase in ranking ██ Decrease in ranking — = Not ranked RV = Received votes т = Tied with team above or below
	Week																				
Poll	Pre	1	2	3	4	5	6	7	8	9	10	11	12	13	14	15	16	17	18	19	Final
AP	RV	RV	RV	24	23	RV	RV	—	—	—	RV	19	13	21	24	24	24	17	24	21	
Coaches	RV	RV	RV	RV	23	23	24	RV	RV	—	—	22	16	24	RV	25	25-T	20	24	21	22

*AP does not release post-NCAA Tournament rankings.
