= 2018–19 Northwestern Wildcats men's basketball team =

American college basketball season

2018–19 Northwestern Wildcats men's basketball
- Conference: Big Ten Conference
- Record: 13–19 (4–16 Big Ten)
- Head coach: Chris Collins (6th season)
- Assistant coaches: Brian James; Billy Donlon; Emanuel Dildy
- Home arena: Welsh-Ryan Arena

2018–19 Big Ten Conference men's basketball standings
	Conf.				Overall
Team	W		L	PCT	W		L	PCT
No. 5 Michigan State †	16	–	4	.800	32	–	7	.821
No. 13 Purdue	16	–	4	.800	26	–	10	.722
No. 8 Michigan	15	–	5	.750	30	–	7	.811
No. 21 Wisconsin	14	–	6	.700	23	–	11	.676
Maryland	13	–	7	.650	23	–	11	.676
Iowa	10	–	10	.500	23	–	12	.657
Minnesota	9	–	11	.450	22	–	14	.611
Ohio State	8	–	12	.400	20	–	15	.571
Indiana	8	–	12	.400	19	–	16	.543
Penn State	7	–	13	.350	14	–	18	.438
Illinois	7	–	13	.350	12	–	21	.364
Rutgers	7	–	13	.350	14	–	17	.452
Nebraska	6	–	14	.300	19	–	17	.528
Northwestern	4	–	16	.200	13	–	19	.406
† 2019 Big Ten tournament winner Rankings from AP poll

The 2018–19 Northwestern Wildcats men's basketball team represented Northwestern University in the 2018–19 NCAA Division I men's basketball season. They were led by sixth-year head coach Chris Collins as members of the Big Ten Conference. They played their home games at the newly renovated Welsh-Ryan Arena in Evanston, Illinois. The Wildcats finished the season 13–19, 4–16 in Big Ten play to finish in last place. They lost in the first round of the Big Ten tournament to Illinois.

== Previous season ==
The Wildcats finished the 2017–18 season 15–17, 6–12 in Big Ten play to finish in 10th place. They lost in the second round of the Big Ten tournament to Penn State.

== Offseason ==
=== Departures ===
Name	Number	Pos.	Height	Weight	Year	Hometown	Reason for departure
Isiah Brown	12	G	6'2"	190	Sophomore	Seattle, WA	Transferred to Grand Canyon
Rapolas Ivanauskas	14	F	6'9"	230	RS Freshman	Barrington, IL	Transferred to Colgate
Scottie Lindsey	20	G/F	6'5"	210	Senior	Hillsdale, IL	Graduated
Bryant McIntosh	30	G	6'3"	200	Senior	New Castle, IN	Graduated
Gavin Skelly	44	F	6'8"	235	Senior	Westlake, OH	Graduated

=== Incoming transfers ===
Name	Number	Pos.	Height	Weight	Year	Hometown	Previous School
Ryan Taylor	14	G	6'6"	195	RS Senior	Gary, IN	Evansville

=== 2018 recruiting class ===
College recruiting information
Name	Hometown	School	Height	Weight	Commit date
Pete Nance; SF	Richfield, OH	Revere High School	6 ft 8 in (2.03 m)	180 lb (82 kg)	Jun 29, 2017
Pete Nance; SF	Recruit ratings: Scout: Rivals: 247Sports: ESPN:				
Ryan Young; PF	Stewartsville, NJ	Bethlehem Catholic High School	6 ft 10 in (2.08 m)	210 lb (95 kg)	Aug 23, 2017
Ryan Young; PF	Recruit ratings: Scout: Rivals: 247Sports: ESPN:				
Miller Kopp; SF	Houston, TX	Houston Christian High School	6 ft 6 in (1.98 m)	200 lb (91 kg)	Sep 21, 2017
Miller Kopp; SF	Recruit ratings: Scout: Rivals: 247Sports: ESPN:				
Overall recruit ranking:
Note: In many cases, Scout, Rivals, 247Sports, On3, and ESPN may conflict in their listings of height and weight.; In these cases, the average was taken. ESPN grades are on a 100-point scale.; Sources: "2018 Northwestern Commits". Rivals.; "2018 Team Ranking". Rivals.

== Roster ==
2018–19 Northwestern Wildcats men's basketball team
Players
Coaches

Pos.	#	Name	Height	Weight	Year	Previous school	Hometown
G	2	Ryan Greer	6 ft 2 in (1.88 m)	185 lb (84 kg)	Fr	Northfield Mount Hermon	Atlanta, GA
F	4	Vic Law	6 ft 7 in (2.01 m)	200 lb (91 kg)	RS Sr	Saint Rita	South Holland, IL
C	5	Dererk Pardon	6 ft 8 in (2.03 m)	235 lb (107 kg)	Sr	Villa Angela-St. Joseph	Cleveland, OH
F	10	Miller Kopp	6 ft 7 in (2.01 m)	210 lb (95 kg)	Fr	Houston Christian	Houston, TX
G	11	Anthony Gaines	6 ft 4 in (1.93 m)	205 lb (93 kg)	So	New Hampton School (N.H.)	Kingston, NY
G	14	Ryan Taylor	6 ft 6 in (1.98 m)	195 lb (88 kg)	RS Sr	St. John's Northwestern Military Academy; Evansville	Gary, IN
C	15	Ryan Young	6 ft 10 in (2.08 m)	235 lb (107 kg)	Fr	Bethlehem Catholic	Stewartsville, NJ
F	21	A. J. Turner	6 ft 7 in (2.01 m)	188 lb (85 kg)	RS Jr	New Hampton School; Boston College	Mount Clemens, MI
F	22	Pete Nance (injured)	6 ft 10 in (2.08 m)	210 lb (95 kg)	Fr	Revere	Akron, OH
G	23	Jordan Ash	6 ft 3 in (1.91 m)	200 lb (91 kg)	Sr	St. Joseph	Bolingbrook, IL
C	25	Barret Benson	6 ft 10 in (2.08 m)	240 lb (109 kg)	Jr	Hinsdale South	Chicago, IL
G	33	Tino Malnati (W)	6 ft 3 in (1.91 m)	190 lb (86 kg)	RS So	New Trier	Northfield, IL
G	34	Charlie Hall (W)	6 ft 5 in (1.96 m)	210 lb (95 kg)	RS Jr	Crossroads	Los Angeles, CA
F	35	Aaron Falzon	6 ft 8 in (2.03 m)	225 lb (102 kg)	RS Jr	Northfield Mount Hermon	Newton, MA

Head coach

- Chris Collins (Duke)

Assistant coach(es)

- Brian James (Illinois State)
- Billy Donlon (UNC Wilmington)
- Emanuel Dildy (Eastern Illinois)

Legend

- (C) Team captain
- (S) Suspended
- (I) Ineligible
- (W) Walk-on
- Injured
- Current redshirt

Roster

== Schedule and results ==
Date time, TV	Rank^{#}	Opponent^{#}	Result	Record	High points	High rebounds	High assists	Site (attendance) city, state
Exhibition
November 2, 2018*; 7:00 pm, BTN+		McKendree	W 83–44	–	14 – Law	8 – Nance	6 – Turner	Welsh–Ryan Arena (7,039); Evanston, IL
Regular season
November 8, 2018*; 7:00 pm, BTN		New Orleans	W 82–52	1–0	20 – Taylor	11 – Pardon	5 – Law	Welsh–Ryan Arena (6,747); Evanston, IL
November 12, 2018*; 7:00 pm, BTN+		American	W 63–51	2–0	26 – Law	18 – Pardon	4 – Pardon	Welsh–Ryan Arena (6,018); Evanston, IL
November 16, 2018*; 6:00 pm, ESPNews		Binghamton	W 84–52	3–0	13 – Turner	14 – Benson	4 – Turner	Welsh–Ryan Arena (7,039); Evanston, IL
November 22, 2018*; 3:30 pm, ESPNU		vs. Fresno State; Wooden Legacy quarterfinals	L 59–78	3–1	13 – Law	7 – Pardon	5 – Law	Titan Gym (4,000); Fullerton, CA
November 23, 2018*; 3:30 pm, ESPNU		vs. La Salle; Wooden Legacy	W 91–74	4–1	21 – Tied	8 – Tied	5 – Taylor	Titan Gym; Fullerton, CA
November 25, 2018*; 1:00 pm, ESPNU		vs. Utah; Wooden Legacy 5th place game	W 79–57	5–1	19 – Law	6 – Law	3 – Pardon	Titan Gym; Fullerton, CA
November 28, 2018*; 8:00 pm, ESPNU		Georgia Tech; ACC–Big Ten Challenge	W 67–61	6–1	20 – Taylor	10 – Pardon	4 – Law	Welsh–Ryan Arena (6,378); Evanston, IL
December 1, 2018; 4:00 pm, BTN		at Indiana	L 66–68	6–2 (0–1)	24 – Pardon	10 – Pardon	3 – Turner	Simon Skjodt Assembly Hall (17,222); Bloomington, IN
December 4, 2018; 8:00 pm, BTN		No. 5 Michigan	L 60–62	6–3 (0–2)	20 – Pardon	7 – Law	5 – Turner	Welsh–Ryan Arena (7,039); Evanston, IL
December 8, 2018*; 11:00 am, BTN		DePaul	W 75–68	7–3	25 – Law	8 – Pardon	7 – Gaines	Welsh–Ryan Arena (7,039); Evanston, IL
December 17, 2018*; 8:00 pm, ESPNU		Chicago State	W 88–46	8–3	17 – Law	7 – Pardon	5 – Greer	Welsh–Ryan Arena (5,954); Evanston, IL
December 21, 2018*; 8:00 pm, BTN		Oklahoma	L 69–76 ^{OT}	8–4	23 – Law	8 – Law	6 – Gaines	Welsh–Ryan Arena (7,039); Evanston, IL
December 30, 2018*; 4:00 pm, BTN+		Columbia	W 75–54	9–4	21 – Tied	10 – Pardon	5 – Law	Welsh–Ryan Arena (6,714); Evanston, IL
January 2, 2019; 7:30 pm, BTN		at No. 8 Michigan State	L 55–81	9–5 (0–3)	19 – Pardon	7 – Benson	4 – Law	Breslin Center (14,797); East Lansing, MI
January 6, 2019; 12:00 pm, BTN		Illinois	W 68–66	10–5 (1–3)	13 – Law	10 – Law	4 – Turner	Welsh–Ryan Arena (7,039); Evanston, IL
January 9, 2019; 8:00 pm, BTN		Iowa	L 63–73	10–6 (1–4)	13 – Tied	10 – Law	6 – Turner	Welsh–Ryan Arena (7,039); Evanston, IL
January 13, 2019; 6:30 pm, BTN		at No. 2 Michigan	L 60–80	10–7 (1–5)	20 – Pardon	10 – Gaines	6 – Turner	Crisler Center (12,707); Ann Arbor, MI
January 18, 2019; 6:00 pm, BTN		at Rutgers	W 65–57	11–7 (2–5)	17 – Pardon	7 – Pardon	5 – Law	Louis Brown Athletic Center (5,459); Piscataway, NJ
January 22, 2019; 8:00 pm, BTN		Indiana	W 73–66	12–7 (3–5)	21 – Falzon	7 – Tied	6 – Tied	Welsh–Ryan Arena (7,039); Evanston, IL
January 26, 2019; 1:15 pm, BTN		at Wisconsin	L 46–62	12–8 (3–6)	8 – Tied	11 – Tied	3 – Gaines	Kohl Center (17,287); Madison, WI
January 29, 2019; 5:30 pm, FS1		at No. 21 Maryland	L 52–70	12–9 (3–7)	18 – Gaines	7 – Tied	2 – Tied	Xfinity Center (15,310); College Park, MD
February 4, 2019; 7:00 pm, FS1		Penn State	L 52–59	12–10 (3–8)	18 – Pardon	10 – Law	6 – Law	Welsh–Ryan Arena (6,541); Evanston, IL
February 10, 2019; 5:30 pm, BTN		at No. 20 Iowa	L 79–80	12–11 (3–9)	24 – Law	10 – Law	3 – Tied	Carver-Hawkeye Arena (11,888); Iowa City, IA
February 13, 2019; 6:00 pm, BTN		Rutgers	L 56–59	12–12 (3–10)	17 – Law	6 – Gaines	4 – Tied	Welsh–Ryan Arena (6,474); Evanston, IL
February 16, 2019; 7:30 pm, BTN		at Nebraska	L 50–59	12–13 (3–11)	15 – Law	12 – Pardon	3 – Pardon	Pinnacle Bank Arena (15,927); Lincoln, NE
February 20, 2019; 7:30 pm, BTN		at Ohio State	L 49–63	12–14 (3–12)	10 – Law	9 – Pardon	2 – Tied	Value City Arena (12,032); Columbus, OH
February 23, 2019; 7:30 pm, BTN		No. 22 Wisconsin	L 64–69	12–15 (3–13)	24 – Law	5 – Gaines	6 – Law	Welsh–Ryan Arena (7,039); Evanston, IL
February 28, 2019; 8:00 pm, ESPN2		Minnesota	L 50–62	12–16 (3–14)	16 – Pardon	13 – Pardon	7 – Law	Welsh–Ryan Arena (6,869); Evanston, IL
March 3, 2019; 5:30 pm, BTN		at Illinois	L 76–81	12–17 (3–15)	16 – Pardon	9 – Pardon	4 – Gaines	State Farm Center (13,924); Champaign, IL
March 6, 2019; 8:00 pm, BTN		Ohio State	W 68–50	13–17 (4–15)	20 – Pardon	13 – Pardon	4 – Kopp	Welsh–Ryan Arena (6,534); Evanston, IL
March 9, 2019; 1:30 pm, BTN		No. 11 Purdue	L 57–70	13–18 (4–16)	14 – Turner	7 – Law	3 – Tied	Welsh–Ryan Arena (7,039); Evanston, IL
Big Ten tournament
March 13, 2019; 8:00 pm, BTN	(14)	vs. (11) Illinois; First round	L 69–74 ^{OT}	13–19	20 – Turner	9 – Gaines	5 – Turner	United Center (16,473); Chicago, IL
*Non-conference game. ^{#}Rankings from AP Poll. (#) Tournament seedings in parentheses. All times are in Eastern Time.
