= Romeo Langford =

American basketball player (born 1999)

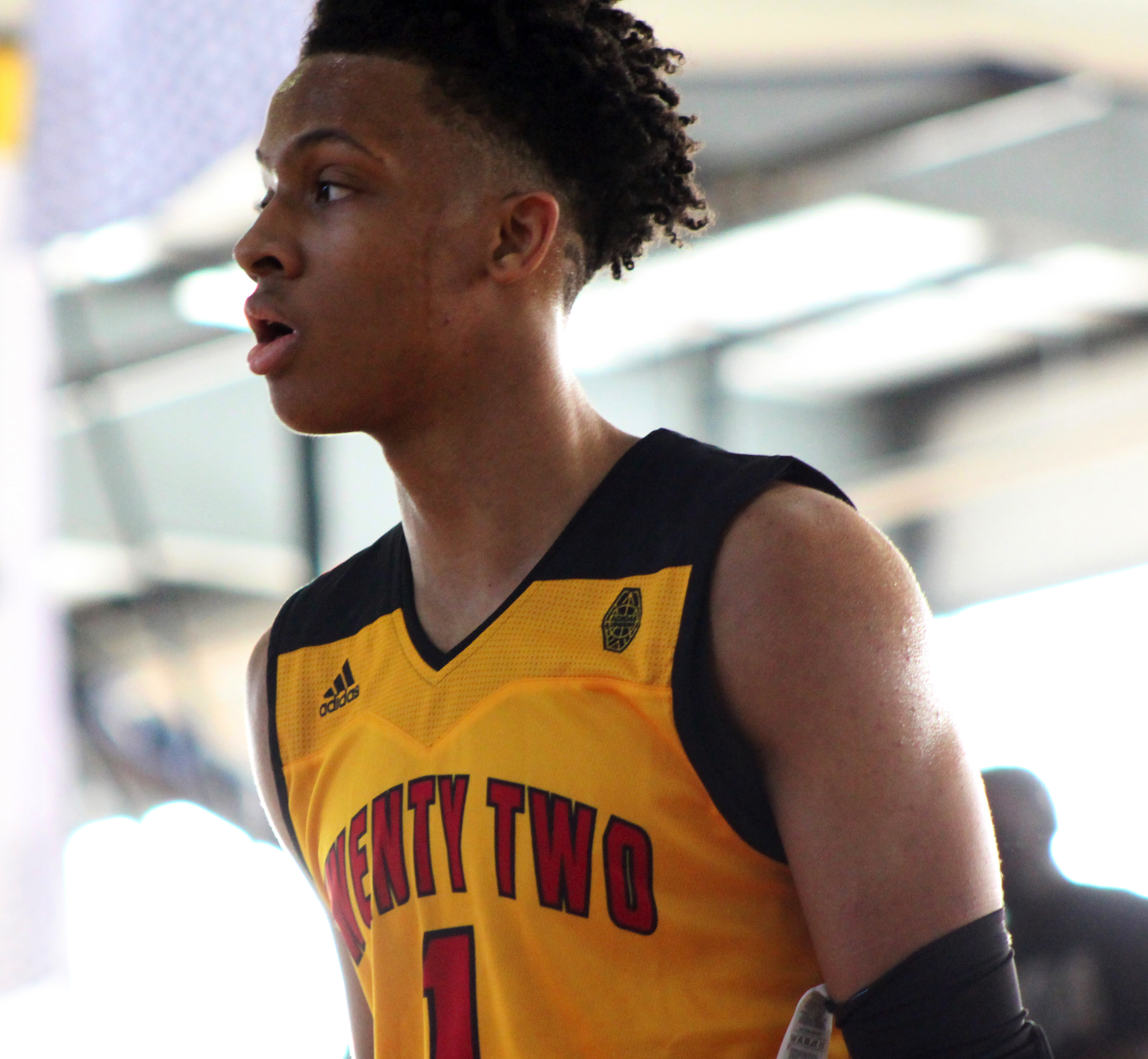
- Langford in 2017

Free agent
- Position: Shooting guard

Personal information
- Born: October 25, 1999 (age 27) New Albany, Indiana, U.S.
- Listed height: 6 ft 5 in (1.96 m)
- Listed weight: 216 lb (98 kg)

Career information
- High school: New Albany (New Albany, Indiana)
- College: Indiana (2018–2019)
- NBA draft: 2019: 1st round, 14th overall pick
- Drafted by: Boston Celtics
- Playing career: 2019–present

Career history
- 2019–2022: Boston Celtics
- 2019–2020: →Maine Red Claws
- 2022–2023: San Antonio Spurs
- 2023–2024: Salt Lake City Stars
- 2024: BCM Gravelines-Dunkerque

Career highlights
- Second-team All-Big Ten (2019); Big Ten All-Freshman team (2019); McDonald's All-American (2018); Indiana Mr. Basketball (2018); Indiana Gatorade Player of the Year (2018)
- Stats at NBA.com
- Stats at Basketball Reference
Medals
Men's basketball
Representing the United States
FIBA U19 World Cup
Bronze medal – third place	2017 Egypt	National team

Romeo James Langford (born October 25, 1999) is an American professional basketball player who last played for BCM Gravelines-Dunkerque of the French LNB Élite. He played college basketball for the Indiana Hoosiers and was ranked as one of the highest prospects in the college class of 2019, as he finished as the fifth overall prospect in the 2018 247sports rankings. A shooting guard, he was drafted by the Boston Celtics 14th overall in the 2019 NBA draft.

== High school career ==
Langford attended New Albany High School. Despite substantial interest from multiple prep schools, Langford chose to spend his four high school years at New Albany. As a freshman, Langford led New Albany to a 23–3 record and the regional tournament while averaging 17.1 points and 6.0 rebounds. In his sophomore year, he averaged 30.2 points, 9.0 rebounds, and 3.0 assists per game while leading New Albany to a 27–1 record and a class 4A state championship, the team's first state title since 1973. In his junior year, he averaged 28.7 points, 8.9 rebounds, and 3.4 assists per game, leading New Albany to a 25–4 record and to the class 4A state quarterfinals. On November 21, 2017, Langford opened up his senior season with a then career high 48 points in a 110–36 victory over Charlestown. On February 1, Langford scored a new career high 63 points against Jennings County. On January 16, 2018, Langford was announced as a McDonald's All-American to participate in the 2018 game., where he competed and won the Legends and Stars Shootout competition. Langford finished his high school career fourth on the all-time Indiana state scoring list with 3,002 points. The penultimate award of his high school career, Langford was crowned Indiana Mr. Basketball of 2018 at the annual IndyStar Sports Awards ceremony. In addition, he was also named the Boys Athlete of the Year.

=== Recruitment ===
Langford was rated as a five-star recruit by Rivals, 247Sports, Scouts, and ESPN, which praised him for his electric scoring and playmaking abilities.

Langford was recruited in high school by numerous high-profile schools, including Indiana, Louisville, Kansas, Kentucky, Vanderbilt, North Carolina, UCLA, and Duke, and was visited by multiple coaches including John Calipari, Bill Self, Roy Williams, and Archie Miller. On November 11, 2017, Langford announced via Twitter that he had narrowed his choices down to Indiana, Kansas, and Vanderbilt. When asked about a timeline for his decision, Langford emphasized that he didn't want to rush the decision, and that he would "probably be making [his] decision after the season." Langford announced on April 11, 2018, that he would declare his college choice on April 30 at New Albany High School. On April 30, 2018, he announced his intention to play for his home state Indiana University. He is the 27th former Indiana Mr. Basketball and 21st former McDonald's All-American to play basketball at Indiana.

College recruiting
Name	Hometown	School	Height	Weight	Commit date
Romeo Langford; SG	New Albany, IN	New Albany (IN)	6 ft 6 in (1.98 m)	195 lb (88 kg)	Apr 30, 2018
Romeo Langford; SG	Recruit ratings: Rivals: 247Sports: ESPN: (95)				
Overall recruit ranking: Rivals: 6 247Sports: 5 ESPN: 5
Note: In many cases, Scout, Rivals, 247Sports, On3, and ESPN may conflict in their listings of height and weight.; In these cases, the average was taken. ESPN grades are on a 100-point scale.; Sources: "Indiana 2018 Basketball Commitments". Rivals.; "2018 Indiana Hoosiers Recruiting Class". ESPN.; "2018 Team Ranking". Rivals.

== College career ==
Langford, who was ESPN's No. 1 shooting guard in the Class of 2018 and Indiana's Gatorade Player of the Year, played one college season in his home state at Indiana University. Langford tore a ligament in his thumb in late November at IU, but continued to play through the injury. Langford was named Big Ten Freshman of the Week four times. He averaged 16.5 points per game, the highest among Big Ten freshmen and the third highest all-time among Indiana University freshmen, behind Eric Gordon and Mike Woodson.

After the season, Langford declared for the 2019 NBA draft.

== Professional career ==
=== Boston Celtics (2019–2022) ===
Langford was selected with the 14th overall draft pick by the Boston Celtics in the 2019 NBA draft. On July 11, 2019, Langford signed his rookie scale contract with the Celtics. Langford was assigned to the Maine Red Claws for the start of the NBA G League season. He rolled his ankle in a game against the Fort Wayne Mad Ants on November 15. On September 22, 2020, the Celtics announced that Langford had undergone surgery to repair the scapholunate ligament of his right wrist and would miss the remainder of the 2019–20 NBA season.

After his injury-riddled rookie season, Langford made his sophomore debut on April 4, 2021, against the Charlotte Hornets. He continued to be a semi-constant rotation player for the rest of the season and showed intriguing signs of future potential in the 18 regular season games he played. As injuries continued to plague the Celtics into the 2021 NBA playoffs, Langford took on a larger role. In four of the five playoff games for Boston, he averaged more than 27 minutes per game. With the absences of Jaylen Brown, Kemba Walker, and Robert Williams, Langford's expanded playoff opportunity showed glimpses of individual progression, notably in Game 5 against the Brooklyn Nets where he dropped a playoff career-high 17 points to go along with two steals and two blocks.

Langford played for the Celtics in the 2021 NBA Summer League. On December 31, 2021, he scored a season-high 16 points, alongside three rebounds and two steals, in a 123–108 win over the Phoenix Suns.

=== San Antonio Spurs (2022–2023) ===
On February 10, 2022, Langford was traded, alongside Josh Richardson, to the San Antonio Spurs in exchange for Derrick White. Langford made his Spurs debut on March 7, scoring seven points in a 117–110 win over the Los Angeles Lakers.

On December 29, 2022, Langford scored a career-high 23 points, alongside three rebounds, two assists and two steals, in a 122–115 win over the New York Knicks.

=== Salt Lake City Stars (2023-2024) ===
On August 30, 2023, Langford signed with the Utah Jazz, but was waived on October 17. On October 30, he joined the Salt Lake City Stars. In the 2023–24 season for SLC, including both regular season and tip-off tournament, Langford played in 30 games (22 starts). In the regular season he averaged 29.5 minutes, scoring 11.9 points and 4.1 rebounds per game.

=== BCM Gravelines-Dunkerque (2024) ===
On October 29, 2024, Langford signed for six weeks with BCM Gravelines-Dunkerque of the LNB Élite. On November 29, Langford and BCM Gravelines-Dunkerque mutually agreed to terminate his contract.

== Career statistics ==
Legend
GP	Games played	GS	Games started	MPG	Minutes per game
FG%	Field goal percentage	3P%	3-point field goal percentage	FT%	Free throw percentage
RPG	Rebounds per game	APG	Assists per game	SPG	Steals per game
BPG	Blocks per game	PPG	Points per game	**Bold**	Career high

=== NBA ===
==== Regular season ====
Year	Team	GP	GS	MPG	FG%	3P%	FT%	RPG	APG	SPG	BPG	PPG
2019–20	Boston	32	2	11.6	.350	.185	.720	1.3	.4	.3	.3	2.5
2020–21	Boston	18	4	15.7	.356	.278	**.750**	1.9	.7	.3	.3	3.1
2021–22	Boston	**44**	5	16.5	.429	**.349**	.588	2.4	.4	.5	**.4**	4.7
2021–22	San Antonio	4	0	10.8	**.571**	.000	.375	1.0	.5	.3	.0	2.8
2022–23	San Antonio	43	**21**	**19.6**	.467	.262	.696	**2.7**	**1.2**	**.6**	.3	**6.9**
Career		141	32	16.1	.430	.288	.659	2.1	.7	.4	.3	4.6

==== Playoffs ====
Year	Team	GP	GS	MPG	FG%	3P%	FT%	RPG	APG	SPG	BPG	PPG
2020	Boston	**7**	0	6.6	.400	**.500**	.500	.4	.3	.1	.0	1.4
2021	Boston	4	**2**	**27.3**	**.406**	.353	**1.000**	**2.5**	**1.3**	**.8**	**.5**	**9.0**
Career		11	2	14.1	.405	.368	.833	1.2	.6	.4	.2	4.2

=== College ===
Year	Team	GP	GS	MPG	FG%	3P%	FT%	RPG	APG	SPG	BPG	PPG
2018–19	Indiana	32	32	34.1	.448	.272	.722	5.4	2.3	.8	.8	16.5
Career		32	32	34.1	.448	.272	.722	5.4	2.3	.8	.8	16.5

== Personal life ==
In his childhood and early years Romeo grew up in New Albany, Indiana. Romeo is the son of Tim and Sabrina Langford, and has two sisters, Tiffany and Tisha. He began playing basketball in the first grade, and has expressed admiration for NBA player LeBron James. Romeo has expressed pride in challenging himself academically through advanced classes and enjoyment in taking math, and noted that he desires a college that would allow him to get a good degree in addition to playing basketball. He was a close friend of NFL player Rondale Moore as the two grew up together on the same block in New Albany and played basketball together through their sophomore year of high school.

He has a basketball court named after him at Sam Peden Community Park in New Albany.
