= 2018–19 Big Ten Conference men's basketball season =

- League: NCAA Division I
- Sport: Basketball
- Teams: 14
- TV partner(s): Big Ten Network, ESPN, Fox, FS1 CBS

2018–19 NCAA Division I men's basketball season
- Regular season champions (shared): Michigan State and Purdue
- Season MVP: Cassius Winston, Michigan State
- Top scorer: Carsen Edwards, Purdue

Tournament
- Venue: United Center, Chicago, Illinois
- Champions: Michigan State
- Runners-up: Michigan
- Finals MVP: Cassius Winston

Basketball seasons
- 2017–18 2019–20

2018–19 Big Ten Conference men's basketball standings
	Conf.				Overall
Team	W		L	PCT	W		L	PCT
No. 5 Michigan State †	16	–	4	.800	32	–	7	.821
No. 13 Purdue	16	–	4	.800	26	–	10	.722
No. 8 Michigan	15	–	5	.750	30	–	7	.811
No. 21 Wisconsin	14	–	6	.700	23	–	11	.676
Maryland	13	–	7	.650	23	–	11	.676
Iowa	10	–	10	.500	23	–	12	.657
Minnesota	9	–	11	.450	22	–	14	.611
Ohio State	8	–	12	.400	20	–	15	.571
Indiana	8	–	12	.400	19	–	16	.543
Penn State	7	–	13	.350	14	–	18	.438
Illinois	7	–	13	.350	12	–	21	.364
Rutgers	7	–	13	.350	14	–	17	.452
Nebraska	6	–	14	.300	19	–	17	.528
Northwestern	4	–	16	.200	13	–	19	.406
† 2019 Big Ten tournament winner Rankings from AP poll

The 2018–19 Big Ten men's basketball season began with practices in October 2018, followed by the start of the 2018–19 NCAA Division I men's basketball season on November 6, 2018. The regular season ended on March 10, 2019.

The 2018–19 season marked the first time in Big Ten history that the teams played a 20-game conference schedule. With a win over Northwestern on March 9, 2019, Purdue won a share of the Big Ten regular season championship, its conference-leading 24th championship. Later that same day, Michigan State defeated Michigan to earn a share of the championship, marking back-to-back championships for the Spartans. Due to tie-breaking rules, Michigan State received the No. 1 seed for the Big Ten tournament.

The Big Ten tournament returned to its more traditional Midwest roots and was held at the United Center in Chicago, Illinois. The Tournament was held from March 13 through March 19, 2019. Michigan State won the Big Ten tournament championship, defeating Michigan for the third time on the season in the championship game.

Michigan State guard Cassius Winston was named Big Ten Player of the Year. Winston, Ethan Happ and Carsen Edwards were 2019 consensus All-Americans. Purdue coach Matt Painter was named Big Ten Coach of the Year for the fourth time and NABC Coach of the Year.

In addition to Michigan State, who received the conference's automatic bid to the NCAA tournament, the conference set a conference record by sending eight teams to the Tournament: Michigan, Purdue, Wisconsin, Maryland, Iowa, Minnesota, and Ohio State. Michigan State advanced to the Final Four. The conference also sent two schools to the National Invitation Tournament: Indiana and Nebraska.

Following the season, Romeo Langford (14th overall), headlined a class of 6 Big Ten conference athletes that were drafted in the 2019 NBA draft. Michigan had two players drafted.

== Head coaches ==
=== Coaching changes prior to the season ===
There were no coaching changes following the 2017–18 season.

=== Coaches ===
The following are the preseason coaching summaries for all conference teams entering the 114th season of Big Ten Conference men's basketball. The table includes former NCAA Division I men's basketball tournament champion coach Tom Izzo and former Big Ten Conference champion coaches Izzo, John Beilein and Matt Painter. 10 of the 14 coaches have had NCAA tournament appearances at their current school.

Team	Head coach	Previous job	Years at school	Overall record	Big Ten record	Big Ten titles	NCAA tournaments	NCAA Final Fours	NCAA Championships
Illinois	Brad Underwood	Oklahoma State	2	14–18	4–14	0	0	0	0
Indiana	Archie Miller	Dayton	2	16–15	9–9	0	0	0	0
Iowa	Fran McCaffery	Siena	9	151–120	68–76	0	3	0	0
Maryland	Mark Turgeon	Texas A&M	8	157–81	49–30*	0	3	0	0
Michigan	John Beilein	West Virginia	12	248–143	111–87	2	8	2	0
Michigan State	Tom Izzo	Michigan State (Asst.)	24	574–225	269–122	8	21	7	1
Minnesota	Richard Pitino	Florida International	6	90–78	31–59	0	1	0	0
Nebraska	Tim Miles	Colorado State	7	97–97	46–62	0	1	0	0
Northwestern	Chris Collins	Duke (Asst.)	6	88–77	36–54	0	1	0	0
Ohio State	Chris Holtmann	Butler	2	25–9	15–3	0	1	0	0
Penn State	Pat Chambers	Boston University	8	113–122	38–87	0	0	0	0
Purdue	Matt Painter	Purdue (Assoc.)	14	295–149	142–88	2	10	0	0
Rutgers	Steve Pikiell	Stony Brook	3	30–37	6–30	0	0	0	0
Wisconsin	Greg Gard	Wisconsin (Assoc.)	4	57–36	31–23	0	2	0	0

Notes:

- All records, appearances, titles, etc. are from time with current school only.
- Year at school includes 2018–19 season.
- Overall and Big Ten records are from time at current school and are through the beginning of the season.
- Turgeon's ACC conference record excluded since Maryland began Big Ten Conference play in 2014–15.

== Preseason ==
Big Ten players received significant preseason accolades. Carsen Edwards was named Preseason National Player of the Year by the Associated Press (AP) and Ethan Happ joined him on the preseason AP All-American team.

=== Preseason All-Big Ten ===
Prior to the conference's annual media day, unofficial awards and a preseason poll were chosen by a panel of 28 writers, two for each team in the conference. Michigan State was the consensus preseason selection to win the conference, receiving 22 of 28 first place votes.

Rank	Team
1	Michigan State (22)
2	Michigan (4)
3	Indiana (1)
4	Nebraska
5	Purdue (1)
6	Wisconsin
7	Maryland
8	Ohio State
9	Minnesota
10	Iowa
11	Penn State
12	Northwestern
13	Illinois
14	Rutgers
(first place votes)

On October 11, 2018, a panel of conference media selected a 10-member preseason All-Big Ten Team and Player of the Year. Junior Edwards who had averaged 18.5 points and tallied 97 three point shots as a sophomore was selected as player of the year. He and Happ were unanimous selections by the Big Ten Conference basketball media to the Preseason All-Big Ten team. Indiana and Michigan State each had two preseason All-Big Ten selections.

Honor	Recipient
Preseason Player of the Year	Carsen Edwards*, Purdue
Preseason All-Big Ten Team	Carsen Edwards, Purdue
Preseason All-Big Ten Team	Ethan Happ*, Wisconsin
Preseason All-Big Ten Team	Romeo Langford, Indiana
Preseason All-Big Ten Team	Juwan Morgan, Indiana
Preseason All-Big Ten Team	Anthony Cowan Jr., Maryland
Preseason All-Big Ten Team	Charles Matthews, Michigan
Preseason All-Big Ten Team	Nick Ward, Michigan State
Preseason All-Big Ten Team	Cassius Winston, Michigan State
Preseason All-Big Ten Team	Jordan Murphy, Minnesota
Preseason All-Big Ten Team	James Palmer Jr., Nebraska
*Unanimous selections

=== Preseason watchlists ===
Several Big Ten players were selected to notable preseason watchlists. Below is a table of notable preseason watch lists.

	Wooden	Naismith	Robertson	Cousy	West	Erving	Malone	Abdul-Jabbar	Olson	Tisdale	Notes
Carsen Edwards, Purdue	✓	✓		✓							
Ethan Happ, Wisconsin	✓	✓						✓			
Romeo Langford, Indiana	✓	✓			✓						
Charles Matthews, Michigan	✓	✓									
Juwan Morgan, Indiana	✓	✓					✓				
Jordan Murphy, Minnesota	✓	✓					✓				
James Palmer Jr., Nebraska	✓	✓			✓						
Jalen Smith, Maryland								✓			
Lamar Stevens, Penn State						✓					
Nick Ward, Michigan State	✓							✓			
Aaron Wiggins, Maryland						✓					
Cassius Winston, Michigan State	✓	✓		✓							

=== Preseason national polls ===
	Sporting News	AP	Athlon; Sports	Bleacher; Report	Blue Ribbon; Yearbook	CBS Sports	Coaches	ESPN	Lindy's; Sports	NBC Sports	SBNation	Sports; Illustrated	USBWA
Illinois													
Indiana						23			25		25		
Iowa													
Maryland	21												
Michigan	10	19	24		23	17	18		21	23	21	18	
Michigan State	12	10	10		10	10	10		10	13	11	10	
Minnesota													
Nebraska			25				25						
Northwestern													
Ohio State													
Penn State													
Purdue		24			19		22		17		22	20	
Rutgers													
Wisconsin													

Five of the fourteen teams had multiple preseason publications name them as preseason top 25 selections. Michigan and Michigan State were included in every publication that was found to publish a list during this season. Michigan State had several top ten selections. Purdue, Indiana, Nebraska and Maryland also had media support in preseason polls. Michigan's only top 10 selection was The Sporting News, which was also Maryland's only top 25 selection.

== Regular season ==
=== 2018 ACC–Big Ten Challenge (Tied 7–7) ===
Date	Time	ACC team	B1G team	Score	Location	Television	Attendance	Challenge leader
Nov 26	7:00 pm	Clemson	**Nebraska**	68–66	Littlejohn Coliseum • Clemson, South Carolina	ESPN2	6,974	B1G (1–0)
Nov 26	9:00 pm	**Boston College**	Minnesota	68–56	Conte Forum • Chestnut Hill, Massachusetts	ESPN2	4,389	Tied (1–1)
Nov 27	7:00 pm	**Notre Dame**	Illinois	76–74	Edmund P. Joyce Center • South Bend, Indiana	ESPNU	8,053	ACC (2–1)
Nov 27	7:00 pm	No. 13 Virginia Tech	**Penn State**	63–62	Bryce Jordan Center • University Park, Pennsylvania	ESPN2	8,373	Tied (2–2)
Nov 27	7:30 pm	**Louisville**	No. 9 Michigan State	82–78 ^{OT}	KFC Yum! Center • Louisville, Kentucky	ESPN	15,477	ACC (3–2)
Nov 27	9:00 pm	NC State	No. 22 **Wisconsin**	79–75	Kohl Center • Madison, Wisconsin	ESPN2	17,012	Tied (3–3)
Nov 27	9:00 pm	Pittsburgh	No. 14 **Iowa**	69–68	Carver–Hawkeye Arena • Iowa City, Iowa	ESPNU	10,158	B1G (4–3)
Nov 27	9:30 pm	No. 3 **Duke**	Indiana	90–69	Cameron Indoor Stadium • Durham, North Carolina	ESPN	9,314	Tied (4–4)
Nov 28	7:00 pm	Miami	**Rutgers**	57–54	Watsco Center • Coral Gables, Florida	ESPNU	6,376	B1G (5–4)
Nov 28	7:00 pm	**Syracuse**	No. 16 Ohio State	72–62	Value City Arena • Columbus, Ohio	ESPN2	16,962	Tied (5–5)
Nov 28	7:30 pm	No. 4 **Virginia**	No. 24 Maryland	76–71	Xfinity Center • College Park, Maryland	ESPN	17,950	ACC (6–5)
Nov 28	9:15 pm	No. 15 **Florida State**	No. 19 Purdue	73–72	Donald L. Tucker Civic Center • Tallahassee, Florida	ESPN2	9,978	ACC (7–5)
Nov 28	9:15 pm	Georgia Tech	**Northwestern**	67–61	Welsh-Ryan Arena • Evanston, Illinois	ESPNU	6,378	ACC (7–6)
Nov 28	9:30 pm	No. 11 North Carolina	No. 7 **Michigan**	84–67	Crisler Center • Ann Arbor, Michigan	ESPN	12,707	Tied (7–7)
**Winners are in bold** Game times in EST; Wake Forest did not play due to the ACC having one more team than the B1G.

=== 2018 Gavitt Tipoff Games (Big Ten 5–3) ===
Date	Time	Big East team	Big Ten team	Score	Location	Television	Attendance	Leader
Tue., Nov. 13	6:30 PM	Xavier	**Wisconsin**	77–68	Cintas Center • Cincinnati, OH	FS1	10,312	Big Ten (1–0)
Tue., Nov. 13	8:30 PM	**Georgetown**	Illinois	88–80	State Farm Center • Champaign, IL	FS1	14,656	Tied (1–1)
Wed., Nov. 14	6:30 PM	No. 8 Villanova	No. 18 **Michigan**	73–46	Finneran Pavilion • Villanova, PA	FS1	6,501	Big Ten (2–1)
Wed., Nov. 14	7:30 PM	Seton Hall	**Nebraska**	80–57	Pinnacle Bank Arena • Lincoln, NE	BTN	15,713	Big Ten (3–1)
Wed., Nov. 14	8:30 PM	No. 24 Marquette	**Indiana**	96–73	Simon Skjodt Assembly Hall • Bloomington, IN	FS1	17,222	Big Ten (4–1)
Thu., Nov. 15	7:00 PM	Creighton	**Ohio State**	69–60	CHI Health Center Omaha • Omaha, NE	FS1	17,146	Big Ten (5–1)
Thu., Nov. 15	9:00 PM	**DePaul**	Penn State	72–70 ^{OT}	Wintrust Arena • Chicago, IL	FS1	3,926	Big Ten (5–2)
Fri., Nov. 16	7:00 PM	**St. John's**	Rutgers	84–65	Louis Brown Athletic Center • Piscataway, NJ	BTN	7,102	Big Ten (5–3)
**WINNERS ARE IN BOLD**. Game Times in EST. Rankings from AP Poll (Nov 12). Did not participate: Butler; Providence (Big East); Iowa, Maryland, Michigan State, Minnesota, Northwestern, Purdue (Big Ten)

=== Rankings ===
Weekly sourced rankings can be found at the above article. Several Big Ten teams were among the preseason ranked teams in both the AP Poll and the Coaches Poll. Michigan State, Michigan, Purdue and Nebraska were ranked in at least one poll, while Indiana, Maryland and Wisconsin also received votes. After the regular season Michigan State, Michigan (both top 10), Purdue and Wisconsin were in the AP Poll. After the season the final Coaches Poll was published they continued to be ranked as was Maryland and Iowa, Minnesota and Ohio State received votes.

Legend
	Improvement in ranking
	Drop in ranking
	Not ranked previous week
RV	Received votes but were not ranked in Top 25 of poll
(Italics)	Number of first place votes

		Pre/ Wk 1	Wk 2	Wk 3	Wk 4	Wk 5	Wk 6	Wk 7	Wk 8	Wk 9	Wk 10	Wk 11	Wk 12	Wk 13	Wk 14	Wk 15	Wk 16	Wk 17	Wk 18	Wk 19	Wk 20	Final
Illinois	AP																					
Illinois	C																					
Indiana	AP	RV	RV	RV	RV	RV	25T	22	23	21	22	25										
Indiana	C	RV		RV	RV	RV	RV	RV	25	22	24	25	RV									
Iowa	AP			20	14	18	22	23	24	24	RV	23	19	RV	20	21	21	22				n/a
Iowa	C			22	15	19	21	24	21	20T	25	24	21	25	20	17	19	21	RV			RV
Maryland	AP	RV	RV	RV	24	23	RV	RV			RV	19	13	21	24	24	24	17	24	21	RV	n/a
Maryland	C	RV		RV	RV	23	23	24	RV			22	16	24	RV	25	25T	20	24	21	RV	22
Michigan	AP	19	18	9	7	5	5(1)	4(1)	2(9)	2(9)	2(9)	2(9)	5	5	7	6	7	9	7	10	8	n/a
Michigan	C	18		8	5	5(1)	5(3)	5(3)	4(4)	4(4)	4(6)	4(6)	6	5	7	7	7	10	7	11	8	11
Michigan State	AP	10	11	11	9	10	9	10	8	8	6	6	6 (2)	6	9	11	10	6	9	6	5	n/a
Michigan State	C	10		11	8	10	9	8	7	7	5	6	5	8	11	12	11	8	11	7	6	3
Minnesota	AP				RV		RV	RV			RV	RV		RV								n/a
Minnesota	C			RV	RV						RV	RV										RV
Nebraska	AP	RV	RV	RV	RV	24	RV	25	RV	24	RV	RV	RV	RV								
Nebraska	C	25		24	RV	25	25	22	23	23T	RV	RV	RV									
Northwestern	AP																					
Northwestern	C																					
Ohio State	AP		RV	23	16	19	15	15	13	14	16	RV										n/a
Ohio State	C			23	16	17	14	14	11	12	17	RV	RV									RV
Penn State	AP																					
Penn State	C																					
Purdue	AP	24	23	24	16	RV	RV	RV	RV	RV	RV	RV	RV	17	15	12	15	14	11	13	13	n/a
Purdue	C	22		19	16	24	RV	RV	RV			RV	RV	18	15	11	13	12	9	12	13	8
Rutgers	AP																					
Rutgers	C																					
Wisconsin	AP	RV	RV	25	22	12	16	16	15	22	RV	RV	RV	24	19	20	22	19	21	19	21	n/a
Wisconsin	C	RV		RV	22	16	19	17	16	23T	RV	RV	RV	23	19	23	23	18	21	19	21	24

=== Player of the week ===
Throughout the conference regular season, the Big Ten offices named one or two players of the week and one or two freshmen of the week each Monday. On December 18, Juwan Morgan earned United States Basketball Writers Association National Player of the Week recognition.

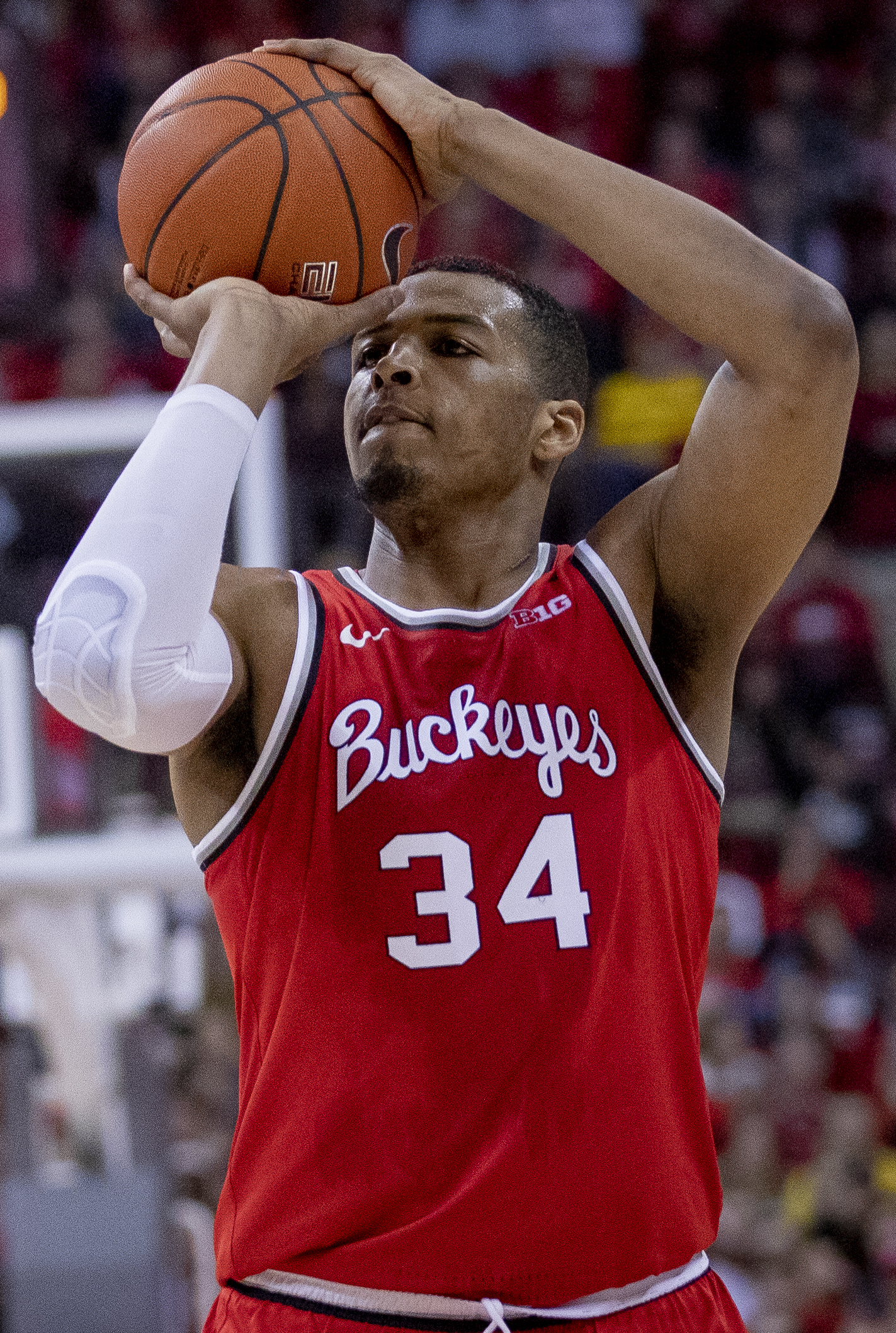
Kaleb Wesson

Week	Player of the week	Freshman of the week
November 12, 2018	Carsen Edwards, PUR	Jalen Smith, MD
November 12, 2018	Ethan Happ, WISC	Jalen Smith, MD
November 19, 2018	Ethan Happ (2), WISC	Romeo Langford, IND
November 26, 2018	Cassius Winston, MSU	Gabe Kalscheur, MINN
November 26, 2018	Ethan Happ (3), WISC	Gabe Kalscheur, MINN
December 3, 2018	Jordan Poole, MICH	Iggy Brazdeikis, MICH
December 10, 2018	Carsen Edwards (2), PUR	Romeo Langford (2), IND
December 10, 2018	Ethan Happ (4), WISC	Iggy Brazdeikis (2), MICH
December 17, 2018	Juwan Morgan, IND	Jalen Smith (2), MD
December 24, 2018	Kaleb Wesson, OSU	Daniel Oturu, MINN
December 31, 2018	Cassius Winston (2), MSU	Iggy Brazdeikis (3), MICH
January 7, 2019	Nick Ward, MSU	Romeo Langford (3), IND
January 14, 2019	Bruno Fernando, MD	Romeo Langford (4), IND
January 21, 2019	Cassius Winston (3), MSU	Joe Wieskamp, IOWA
January 28, 2019	Cassius Winston (4), MSU	Iggy Brazdeikis (4), MICH
January 28, 2019	Jordan Murphy, MINN	Iggy Brazdeikis (4), MICH
February 4, 2019	Carsen Edwards (3), PUR	Joe Wieskamp (2), IOWA
February 11, 2019	Giorgi Bezhanishvili, ILL	Ayo Dosunmu, ILL
February 18, 2019	Jordan Murphy (2), MINN	Ayo Dosunmu (2), ILL
February 25, 2019	Cassius Winston (5), MSU	Daniel Oturu (2), MINN
March 4, 2019	Amir Coffey, MINN	Ron Harper Jr., RUT
March 10, 2019	Juwan Morgan (2), IND	Jalen Smith (3), MD
March 10, 2019	Amir Coffey (2), MINN	Jalen Smith (3), MD

=== Early season tournaments ===
11 of the 14 Big Ten teams participated in early season tournaments. Each team's finish is noted below. Indiana, Ohio State, and Rutgers did not participate in a tournament. Illinois, Indiana, Michigan, Nebraska, Ohio State, Penn State, Rutgers, and Wisconsin participated in the Gavitt Tip-Off Games against Big East Conference teams for a fourth consecutive year. The result was a 5–3 victory for the Big Ten. All Big Ten teams also participated in the ACC–Big Ten Challenge against Atlantic Coast Conference teams, the 20th year for the event. The 2018 results were a 7–7 tie.

Team	Tournament	Finish
Illinois	Maui Invitational	8th
Iowa	2K Sports Classic	1st
Maryland	Veterans Classic	1–0
Michigan	Hall of Fame Tip-Off	1st
Michigan State	Las Vegas Invitational	1st
Minnesota	Vancouver Showcase	3–0
Nebraska	CBE Hall of Fame Classic	2nd
Northwestern	Wooden Legacy	5th
Purdue	Charleston Classic	2nd
Penn State	Cancún Challenge	2nd
Wisconsin	Battle 4 Atlantis	2nd

==== ACC–Big Ten Challenge ====
Date	Time	ACC team	B1G team	Score	Location	Television	Attendance	Challenge leader
Nov 26	7:00 pm	Clemson	**Nebraska**	68–66	Littlejohn Coliseum • Clemson, South Carolina	ESPN2	6,974	B1G (1–0)
Nov 26	9:00 pm	**Boston College**	Minnesota	68–56	Conte Forum • Chestnut Hill, Massachusetts	ESPN2	4,389	Tied (1–1)
Nov 27	7:00 pm	**Notre Dame**	Illinois	76–74	Edmund P. Joyce Center • South Bend, Indiana	ESPNU	8,053	ACC (2–1)
Nov 27	7:00 pm	No. 13 Virginia Tech	**Penn State**	63–62	Bryce Jordan Center • University Park, Pennsylvania	ESPN2	8,373	Tied (2–2)
Nov 27	7:30 pm	**Louisville**	No. 9 Michigan State	82–78 ^{OT}	KFC Yum! Center • Louisville, Kentucky	ESPN	15,477	ACC (3–2)
Nov 27	9:00 pm	NC State	No. 22 **Wisconsin**	79–75	Kohl Center • Madison, Wisconsin	ESPN2	17,012	Tied (3–3)
Nov 27	9:00 pm	Pittsburgh	No. 14 **Iowa**	69–68	Carver–Hawkeye Arena • Iowa City, Iowa	ESPNU	10,158	B1G (4–3)
Nov 27	9:30 pm	No. 3 **Duke**	Indiana	90–69	Cameron Indoor Stadium • Durham, North Carolina	ESPN	9,314	Tied (4–4)
Nov 28	7:00 pm	Miami	**Rutgers**	57–54	Watsco Center • Coral Gables, Florida	ESPNU	6,376	B1G (5–4)
Nov 28	7:00 pm	**Syracuse**	No. 16 Ohio State	72–62	Value City Arena • Columbus, Ohio	ESPN2	16,962	Tied (5–5)
Nov 28	7:30 pm	No. 4 **Virginia**	No. 24 Maryland	76–71	Xfinity Center • College Park, Maryland	ESPN	17,950	ACC (6–5)
Nov 28	9:15 pm	No. 15 **Florida State**	No. 19 Purdue	73–72	Donald L. Tucker Civic Center • Tallahassee, Florida	ESPN2	9,978	ACC (7–5)
Nov 28	9:15 pm	Georgia Tech	**Northwestern**	67–61	Welsh-Ryan Arena • Evanston, Illinois	ESPNU	6,378	ACC (7–6)
Nov 28	9:30 pm	No. 11 North Carolina	No. 7 **Michigan**	84–67	Crisler Center • Ann Arbor, Michigan	ESPN	12,707	Tied (7–7)
**Winners Are In Bold**; Game times in EST; Wake Forest did not play due to the ACC having one more team than the B1G.

==== Gavitt Tipoff Games ====
Date	Time	Big East team	Big Ten team	Score	Location	Television	Attendance	Leader
Tue., Nov. 13	6:30 PM	Xavier	**Wisconsin**	77–68	Cintas Center • Cincinnati, OH	FS1	10,312	Big Ten (1–0)
Tue., Nov. 13	8:30 PM	**Georgetown**	Illinois	88–80	State Farm Center • Champaign, IL	FS1	14,656	Tied (1–1)
Wed., Nov. 14	6:30 PM	No. 8 Villanova	No. 18 **Michigan**	73–46	Finneran Pavilion • Villanova, PA	FS1	6,501	Big Ten (2–1)
Wed., Nov. 14	7:30 PM	Seton Hall	**Nebraska**	80–57	Pinnacle Bank Arena • Lincoln, NE	BTN	15,713	Big Ten (3–1)
Wed., Nov. 14	8:30 PM	No. 24 Marquette	**Indiana**	96–73	Simon Skjodt Assembly Hall • Bloomington, IN	FS1	17,222	Big Ten (4–1)
Thu., Nov. 15	7:00 PM	Creighton	**Ohio State**	69–60	CHI Health Center Omaha • Omaha, NE	FS1	17,146	Big Ten (5–1)
Thu., Nov. 15	9:00 PM	**DePaul**	Penn State	72–70 ^{OT}	Wintrust Arena • Chicago, IL	FS1	3,926	Big Ten (5–2)
Fri., Nov. 16	7:00 PM	**St. John's**	Rutgers	84–65	Louis Brown Athletic Center • Piscataway, NJ	BTN	7,102	Big Ten (5–3)
**Winners Are In Bold**. Game Times in EST. Rankings from AP Poll (Nov 12). Did not participate: Butler; Providence (Big East); Iowa, Maryland, Michigan State, Minnesota, Northwestern, Purdue (Big Ten)

=== Conference matrix ===
This table summarizes the head-to-head results between teams in conference play. Each team will play 20 conference games, and at least one game against each opponent. The 2018–19 season marked the first time in Big Ten history that the teams played a 20-game conference schedule. The new schedule included a regional component to increase the frequency of games among teams in similar areas. Over the course of a six-year cycle (12 playing opportunities), in-state rivals will play each other 12 times, regional opponents will play 10 times, and all other teams will play nine times. Three in-state series will be guaranteed home-and-homes: Illinois and Northwestern, Indiana and Purdue, and Michigan and Michigan State will always play twice. The conference opponent list was released on April 19, 2018.

	Illinois	Indiana	Iowa	Maryland	Michigan	Michigan St	Minnesota	Nebraska	Northwestern	Ohio St	Penn St	Purdue	Rutgers	Wisconsin
vs. Illinois	–	2–0	1–0	0–1	1–0	0–1	1–1	1–1	1–1	1–1	2–0	1–0	0–1	2–0
vs. Indiana	0–2	–	2–0	1–0	2–0	0–2	1–0	1–0	1–1	1–0	0–1	2–0	1–1	0–1
vs. Iowa	0–1	0–2	–	1–0	0–1	2–0	1–0	1–1	0–2	1–1	0–1	1–0	1–1	2–0
vs. Maryland	1–0	0–1	0–1	–	2–0	1–0	0–2	0–2	0–1	0–2	1–1	1–1	0–1	1–1
vs. Michigan	0–1	0–2	1–0	0–2	–	2–0	0–2	0–1	0–2	0–1	1–1	0–1	0–1	1–1
vs. Michigan St	1–0	2–0	0–2	0–1	0–2	–	0–1	0–2	0–1	0–2	0–1	1–1	0–2	0–1
vs. Minnesota	1–1	0–1	0–1	2–0	2–0	1–0	–	1–1	0–1	1–0	0–1	1–1	1–1	1–1
vs. Nebraska	1–1	0–1	1–1	2–0	1–0	2–0	1–1	–	0–1	1–0	1–1	2–0	1–0	1–0
vs. Northwestern	1–1	1–1	2–0	1–0	2–0	1–0	1–0	1–0	–	1–1	1–0	1–0	1–1	2–0
vs. Ohio State	1–1	0–1	1–1	2–0	1–0	2–0	0–1	0–1	1–1	–	0–1	2–0	1–1	1–0
vs. Penn State	0–2	1–0	1–0	1–1	1–1	1–0	1–0	1–1	0–1	1–0	–	2–0	1–1	2–0
vs. Purdue	0–1	0–2	0–1	1–1	1–0	1–1	1–1	0–2	0–1	0–2	0–2	–	0–1	0–1
vs. Rutgers	1–0	1–1	1–1	1–0	1–0	2–0	1–1	0–1	1–1	1–1	1–1	1–0	–	1–0
vs. Wisconsin	0–2	1–0	0–2	1–1	1–1	1–0	1–1	0–1	0–2	0–1	0–2	1–0	0–1	–
Total	**7–13**	**8–12**	**10–10**	**13–7**	**15–5**	**16–4**	**9–11**	**6–14**	**4–16**	**8–12**	**7–13**	**16–4**	**7–13**	**14–6**

The Big Ten led the nation in average attendance with 12,691 patrons, outpacing the SEC (11,527), ACC (10,912), Big 12 (10,170) and Big East (9,999). Of the 351 schools that host Division I basketball competition, Wisconsin (5th, 17,170), Nebraska (10th, 15,341), Indian (12th, 15,206), Michigan State (13th, 14,797), Purdue (14th, 14,467), Maryland (18th, 14,009), Ohio State (19th, 13,922), Iowa (23rd, 12,869), Michigan (24th, 12,505), and Illinois (25th, 12,456) were all among the top 25 in attendance. It marked the 43rd consecutive season that the Big Ten has led the nation in attendance.

== Honors and awards ==
=== All-Big Ten awards and teams ===
On March 11, 2019, the Big Ten announced most of its conference awards, with separate slates of awards from the media and the coaches. Cassius Winston was selected as Big Ten Conference Men's Basketball Player of the Year. Winston and Carsen Edwards were unanimous first team All-Big Ten selections by both the coaches and the media. Purdue coach Matt Painter was named Big Ten Coach of the Year for the fourth time, which tied him for third most in conference history behind Gene Keady and Bobby Knight, with 7 and 5, respectively.

Honor	Coaches	Media
Player of the Year	Cassius Winston, Michigan State	Cassius Winston, Michigan State
Coach of the Year	Matt Painter, Purdue	Matt Painter, Purdue
Freshman of the Year	Ignas Brazdeikis, Michigan	Ignas Brazdeikis, Michigan
Defensive Player of the Year	Josh Reaves, Penn State	Not Selected
Sixth Man of the Year	Xavier Tillman, Michigan State	Not Selected
All-Big Ten First Team	Carsen Edwards, Purdue	Carsen Edwards, Purdue
All-Big Ten First Team	Bruno Fernando, Maryland	Bruno Fernando, Maryland
All-Big Ten First Team	Ethan Happ, Wisconsin	Ethan Happ, Wisconsin
All-Big Ten First Team	Lamar Stevens, Penn State	Jordan Murphy, Minnesota
All-Big Ten First Team	Cassius Winston, Michigan State	Cassius Winston, Michigan State
All-Big Ten Second Team	Ignas Brazdeikis, Michigan	Ignas Brazdeikis, Michigan
All-Big Ten Second Team	Anthony Cowan Jr., Maryland	Tyler Cook, Iowa
All-Big Ten Second Team	Romeo Langford, Indiana	Anthony Cowan Jr., Maryland
All-Big Ten Second Team	Jordan Murphy, Minnesota	Zavier Simpson, Michigan
All-Big Ten Second Team	Zavier Simpson, Michigan	Lamar Stevens, Penn State
All-Big Ten Third Team	Jordan Bohannon, Iowa	Amir Coffey, Minnesota
All-Big Ten Third Team	Amir Coffey, Minnesota	Romeo Langford, Indiana
All-Big Ten Third Team	Tyler Cook, Iowa	Juwan Morgan, Indiana
All-Big Ten Third Team	James Palmer Jr., Nebraska	James Palmer Jr., Nebraska
All-Big Ten Third Team	Nick Ward, Michigan State	Nick Ward, Michigan State
All-Big Ten Honorable Mention	Geo Baker, Rutgers	Geo Baker, Rutgers
All-Big Ten Honorable Mention	Ryan Cline, Purdue	Jordan Bohannon, Iowa
All-Big Ten Honorable Mention	Ayo Dosunmu, Illinois	Ryan Cline, Purdue
All-Big Ten Honorable Mention	Kenny Goins, Michigan State	Ayo Dosunmu, Illinois
All-Big Ten Honorable Mention	Matt McQuaid, Michigan State	Trent Frazier, Illinois
All-Big Ten Honorable Mention	Juwan Morgan, Indiana	Luka Garza, Iowa
All-Big Ten Honorable Mention	Dererk Pardon, Northwestern	Kenny Goins, Michigan State
All-Big Ten Honorable Mention	Jordan Poole, Michigan	Matt Haarms, Purdue
All-Big Ten Honorable Mention	Jon Teske, Michigan	Vic Law, Northwestern
All-Big Ten Honorable Mention	Kaleb Wesson, Ohio State	Matt McQuaid, Michigan State
All-Big Ten Honorable Mention	Not Selected	Charles Matthews, Michigan
All-Big Ten Honorable Mention	Not Selected	Eugene Omoruyi, Rutgers
All-Big Ten Honorable Mention	Not Selected	Dererk Pardon, Northwestern
All-Big Ten Honorable Mention	Not Selected	Jordan Poole, Michigan
All-Big Ten Honorable Mention	Not Selected	Josh Reaves, Penn State
All-Big Ten Honorable Mention	Not Selected	Jon Teske, Michigan
All-Big Ten Honorable Mention	Not Selected	D'Mitrik Trice, Wisconsin
All-Big Ten Honorable Mention	Not Selected	Kaleb Wesson, Ohio State
All-Freshman Team	Ignas Brazdeikis, Michigan	Not Selected
All-Freshman Team	Ayo Dosunmu, Illinois	Not Selected
All-Freshman Team	Romeo Langford, Indiana	Not Selected
All-Freshman Team	Jalen Smith, Maryland	Not Selected
All-Freshman Team	Joe Wieskamp, Iowa	Not Selected
All-Defensive Team	Nojel Eastern, Purdue	Not Selected
All-Defensive Team	Bruno Fernando, Maryland	Not Selected
All-Defensive Team	Matt McQuaid, Michigan State	Not Selected
All-Defensive Team	Josh Reaves, Penn State	Not Selected
All-Defensive Team	Zavier Simpson, Michigan	Not Selected

=== USBWA ===
On March 12, the U.S. Basketball Writers Association released its 2018–19 Men's All-District Teams, based upon voting from its national membership. There were nine regions from coast to coast, and a player and coach of the year were selected in each. The following lists all the Big Ten representatives selected within their respective regions.

District II (NY, NJ, DE, DC, PA, WV)
- Lamar Stevens, Penn State
District V (OH, IN, IL, MI, MN, WI)

Player of the Year

- Cassius Winston, Michigan State

Coach of the Year

- Matt Painter, Purdue

All-District Team

- Iggy Brazdeikis, Michigan
- Carsen Edwards, Purdue
- Ethan Happ, Wisconsin
- Romeo Langford, Indiana
- Jordan Murphy, Minnesota
- Zavier Simpson, Michigan
- Cassius Winston, Michigan State
District VI (IA, MO, KS, OK, NE, ND, SD)
- Tyler Cook, Iowa
- James Palmer Jr., Nebraska

=== NABC ===
The National Association of Basketball Coaches announced their Division I All-District teams on March 21, recognizing the nation's best men's collegiate basketball student-athletes. Selected and voted on by member coaches of the NABC, the selections on this list were then eligible for NABC Coaches' All-America Honors. The following list represented the District 7 players chosen to the list.

First Team

- Cassius Winston, Michigan State
- Carsen Edwards, Purdue
- Ethan Happ, Wisconsin
- Bruno Fernando, Maryland
- Jordan Murphy, Minnesota

Second Team

- Zavier Simpson, Michigan
- Tyler Cook, Iowa
- Anthony Cowan, Maryland
- Iggy Brazdeikis, Michigan
- Lamar Stevens, Penn State

=== Other awards ===
Happ, Edwards and Winston were 2019 consensus All-Americans (second team). Brazdeikis was an Associated Press All-American honorable mention selection. Matt Painter was named NABC Coach of the Year.

== Postseason ==
=== Big Ten tournament ===
Michigan State emerged as the champion of the 2019 Big Ten Conference men's basketball tournament by defeating in-state rival Michigan 65–60 in the championship game. As the top seed, their path included a double bye and victories over Ohio State and Wisconsin.

First round Wednesday, March 13; BTN
12	Rutgers	61
13	Nebraska	68
11	Illinois	74*
14	Northwestern	69

Second round Thursday, March 14; BTN
8	Ohio State	79
9	Indiana	75
5	Maryland	61
13	Nebraska	69
7	Minnesota	77*
10	Penn State	72
6	Iowa	83
11	Illinois	62

Quarterfinals; Friday, March 15; BTN
1	Michigan State	77
8	Ohio State	70
4	Wisconsin	66
13	Nebraska	62
2	Purdue	73
7	Minnesota	75
3	Michigan	74
6	Iowa	53

Semifinals; Saturday, March 16; CBS
1	Michigan State	67
4	Wisconsin	55
7	Minnesota	49
3	Michigan	76

Championship; Sunday, March 17; CBS
1	Michigan State	65
3	Michigan	60

* denotes overtime period

=== NCAA tournament ===
The winner of the Big Ten tournament, Michigan State, received the conference's automatic bid to the NCAA tournament. Eight Big Ten teams received bids to the NCAA tournament, the most of any conference in the tournament and the most in the conference's history. Seven teams reaching the round of 32 established another conference record. Michigan State reached the final four for the 10th time. In the postseason, the Big Ten had a 13–8 record in the NCAA tournament.

Seed	Region	School	First Four	First Round	Second Round	Sweet Sixteen	Elite Eight	Final Four	Championship
2	East	Michigan State	N/A	defeated (15) Bradley 76–65	defeated (10) Minnesota 70–50	defeated (3) LSU 80–63	defeated (1) Duke 68–67	lost to (3 W) Texas Tech 51–61	
2	West	Michigan	N/A	defeated (15) Montana 74–55	defeated (10) Florida 64–49	lost to (3) Texas Tech 44–63			
3	South	Purdue	N/A	defeated (14) Old Dominion 61–48	defeated (6) Villanova 87–61	defeated (2) Tennessee 99–94^{OT}	lost to (1) Virginia 75–80^{OT}		
5	South	Wisconsin	N/A	lost to (12) Oregon 54–72					
6	East	Maryland	N/A	defeated (11) Belmont 79–77	lost to (3) LSU 67–69				
10	East	Minnesota	N/A	defeated (7) Louisville 86–76	lost to (2) Michigan State 50–70				
10	South	Iowa	N/A	defeated (7) Cincinnati 79–72	lost to (2) Tennessee 77–83^{OT}				
11	Midwest	Ohio State	N/A	defeated (6) Iowa State 20–14	lost to (3) Houston 59–74				
		W–L (%):	0–0 (–)	7–1 (.875)	3–4 (.429)	2–1 (.667)	1–1 (.500)	0–1 (.000)	0–0 (–) Total: 13–8 (.619)

=== National Invitation Tournament ===
Two Big Ten teams received invitations to the National Invitation Tournament. The conference had a 3–2 record in the NIT tournament.

Seed	Bracket	School	First round	Second round	Quarterfinals	Semifinals	Finals
1	Indiana	Indiana	defeated (8) Saint Francis (PA) 89–72	defeated (5) Arkansas 63–60	lost to (6) Wichita State 63–73		
4	TCU	Nebraska	defeated (5) Butler 80–76	lost to (1) TCU 72–88			
		W–L (%):	2–0 (1.000)	1–1 (.500)	0–1 (.000)	0–0 (–)	0–0 (–) Total: 3–2 (.600)

=== 2019 NBA draft ===
Six players were drafted from Big Ten teams during the 2019 NBA draft. Two players were drafted from Michigan and two were drafted by the Philadelphia 76ers.

Round	Pick	Overall	Player	NBA club	B1G team
1	14	14	Romeo Langford	Boston Celtics(from Sacramento via Philadelphia) (Note: July 10, 2015: Sacramento Kings to Philadelphia 76ers: Philadelphia acquired Nik Stauskas, Carl Landry, Jason Thompson, and a 2019 first-round pick; Sacramento acquired the draft rights to Artūras Gudaitis and Luka Mitrović; June 23, 2016: Philadelphia 76ers to Boston Celtics: Boston acquired a 2017 first-round pick (No. 3 - Jayson Tatum) and a 2019 first-round pick; Philadelphia acquired a 2017 first-round pick (No. 1 - Markelle Fultz))	Indiana
1	28	28	Jordan Poole	Golden State Warriors	Michigan
2	3	33	Carsen Edwards	Philadelphia 76ers(from Cleveland via New York and Orlando; (Note: January 5, 2015: Cleveland Cavaliers to New York Knicks (three-team trade with Oklahoma City): New York acquired Lou Amundson, Alex Kirk, Lance Thomas, and Cleveland's 2019 second-round pick; Cleveland acquired Iman Shumpert, J. R. Smith, and Oklahoma City's protected 2015 first-round pick; Oklahoma City acquired Dion Waiters) (Note: July 9, 2015: New York Knicks to Orlando Magic: Orlando acquired cash considerations and the right to swap 2019 second-round picks between New York and Orlando; New York Knicks acquired Kyle O'Quinn via a sign-and-trade deal) (Note: February 7, 2019: Orlando Magic to Philadelphia 76ers: Philadelphia acquired Jonathon Simmons, a 2020 first-round pick, and a 2019 second-round pick; Orlando acquired Markelle Fultz) traded to Boston) (Note: June 20, 2019: Boston Celtics to Philadelphia 76ers: Philadelphia acquired Boston's first-round pick (No. 20 - Matisse Thybulle); Boston acquired Philadelphia's first- and second-round picks (No. 24 - Ty Jerome and No. 33 - Carsen Edwards))	Purdue
2	4	34	Bruno Fernando	Philadelphia 76ers (from Chicago via L.A. Lakers; (Note: July 7, 2016: Chicago Bulls to Los Angeles Lakers: Los Angeles Lakers acquired José Calderón and two future second-round picks; Chicago acquired the draft rights to Ater Majok; July 6, 2018: Los Angeles Lakers to Philadelphia 76ers: Philadelphia acquired cash considerations and a 2019 second-round pick; Los Angeles Lakers acquired Isaac Bonga) traded to Atlanta) (Note: July 6, 2019: Philadelphia 76ers to Atlanta Hawks: Atlanta acquired a 2019 second-round pick (No. 34 - Bruno Fernando); Philadelphia acquired a 2019 second-round pick (No. 57 - Jordan Bone) and two future second-round picks)	Maryland
2	15	45	Isaiah Roby	Detroit Pistons(from Detroit via Oklahoma City and Boston; (Note: February 19, 2015: Detroit Pistons to Oklahoma City Thunder (three-team trade with Utah): Oklahoma City acquired D. J. Augustin, Kyle Singler, and a 2019 second-round pick; Detroit acquired Reggie Jackson; Utah acquired a 2017 second-round pick; July 14, 2015: Oklahoma City Thunder to Boston Celtics: Boston acquired Perry Jones III, a 2019 second-round pick, and cash considerations; Oklahoma City acquired a 2018 second-round pick; July 7, 2017: Boston Celtics to Detroit Pistons: Detroit acquired Avery Bradley and a 2019 second-round pick; Boston acquired Marcus Morris) traded to Dallas) (Note: June 27, 2019: Dallas Mavericks to Detroit Pistons: Detroit acquired a 2019 second-round pick (No. 37 - Deividas Sirvydis); Dallas acquired a 2019 second-round pick (No. 45 - Isaiah Roby) and two future-second round picks)	Nebraska
2	17	47	Ignas Brazdeikis	Sacramento Kings(from Orlando via New York; (Note: July 14, 2017: New York Knicks to Sacramento Kings: Sacramento acquired a 2019 second-round pick and cash considerations; New York acquired the rights to hire Scott Perry as general manager) traded to New York) (Note: June 20, 2019: Sacramento Kings to New York Knicks: New York acquired Sacramento's second-round pick (No. 47 - Ignas Brazdeikis); Sacramento acquired New York's second-round pick (No. 55 - Kyle Guy) and cash considerations)	Michigan

==== Pre-draft trades ====
Prior to the day of the draft, the following trades were made and resulted in exchanges of draft picks between the teams below.

==== Draft-day trades ====
Draft-day trades were made on June 20, 2019, the day of the draft.

==== Post-draft trades ====
The following trades were reportedly agreed prior to and on the day of the draft and were completed at a later date. Due to salary cap reasons, most of these trades were officially announced on July 6, after the NBA moratorium period ended.

=== Coaching changes following the season ===
Following the season, Fred Hoiberg was named coach of Nebraska Cornhuskers men's basketball where his grandfather, Jerry Bush, had coached for nine years and in Lincoln, Nebraska where he was born. Following the season, Juwan Howard was named coach of Michigan Wolverines men's basketball where he had been an All-American in 1994 as a player.
