= Ethan Happ =

American basketball player (born 1996)

- Happ with CB Gran Canaria in 2024

No. 22 – La Laguna Tenerife
- Position: Power forward / center
- League: Liga ACB; EuroCup

Personal information
- Born: May 7, 1996 (age 30) Milan, Illinois, U.S.
- Listed height: 2.08 m (6 ft 10 in)
- Listed weight: 108 kg (238 lb)

Career information
- High school: Rockridge (Taylor Ridge, Illinois)
- College: Wisconsin (2015–2019)
- NBA draft: 2019: undrafted
- Playing career: 2019–present

Career history
- 2019–2020: Olympiacos
- 2019–2020: → Vanoli Cremona
- 2020–2021: Fortitudo Bologna
- 2021: Dinamo Sassari
- 2022: Riesen Ludwigsburg
- 2022–2023: Río Breogán
- 2023–2024: Gran Canaria
- 2024–2025: Valencia
- 2025–2026: San Pablo Burgos
- 2026–present: La Laguna Tenerife

Career highlights
- Consensus second-team All-American (2019); Third-team All-American – AP, NABC, SN (2017); Pete Newell Big Man Award (2019); Kareem Abdul-Jabbar Award (2019); 3× First-team All-Big Ten (2017–2019); Third-team All-Big Ten – Media (2016); Big Ten Freshman of the Year (2016); Big Ten All-Freshman team (2016); 2× Big Ten All-Defensive team (2016, 2017); Albert Schweitzer Tournament MVP (2014)

Ethan Happ (born May 7, 1996) is an American–born naturalized Macedonian professional basketball player for La Laguna Tenerife of the Spanish Liga ACB and the EuroCup. At a height of 2.08 m (6 ft 10 in) tall, he plays at both the power forward and center positions.

Happ is the all-time leading rebounder for the Wisconsin Badgers, where he started all 139 games of his college career and is the school record holder in double-doubles and triple-doubles. Happ is one of just six players in NCAA history to record at least 2,000 points, 1,000 rebounds and 400 assists.

== High school career ==
Happ, whose hometown is Milan, Illinois, attended Rockridge High School, in Taylor Ridge, Illinois, where he played high school basketball.

College recruiting
Name	Hometown	School	Height	Weight	Commit date
Ethan Happ; PF	Milan, IL	Rockridge	6 ft 8 in (2.03 m)	200 lb (91 kg)	Jun 26, 2013
Ethan Happ; PF	Recruit ratings: Scout: Rivals: 247Sports: ESPN:				
Overall recruit ranking:
Note: In many cases, Scout, Rivals, 247Sports, On3, and ESPN may conflict in their listings of height and weight.; In these cases, the average was taken. ESPN grades are on a 100-point scale.; Sources: "2014 Wisconsin Commitments". Rivals.; "Men's Basketball Recruiting". Scout.; "ESPN- Wisconsin Badgers Men's Basketball Recruiting". ESPN.; "Scout.com Team Recruiting Rankings". Scout.; "2014 Team Ranking". Rivals.

== College career ==
He attended the University of Wisconsin, where he played college basketball with the Wisconsin Badgers. Happ red-shirted during his freshman season, during which the Badgers were the 2015 NCAA runner-up.

Happ started every game in 2015–16 for the Badgers and was named Big Ten Freshman of the Year. He was also a unanimous selection the Big Ten All-Freshman Team and named to the Big Ten All-Defensive Team. He was selected to the third team All-Big Ten by the media and honorable mention by the coaches. As a sophomore, Happ became a greatly improved player. He was named a third-team All-American after averaging 14 points per game.

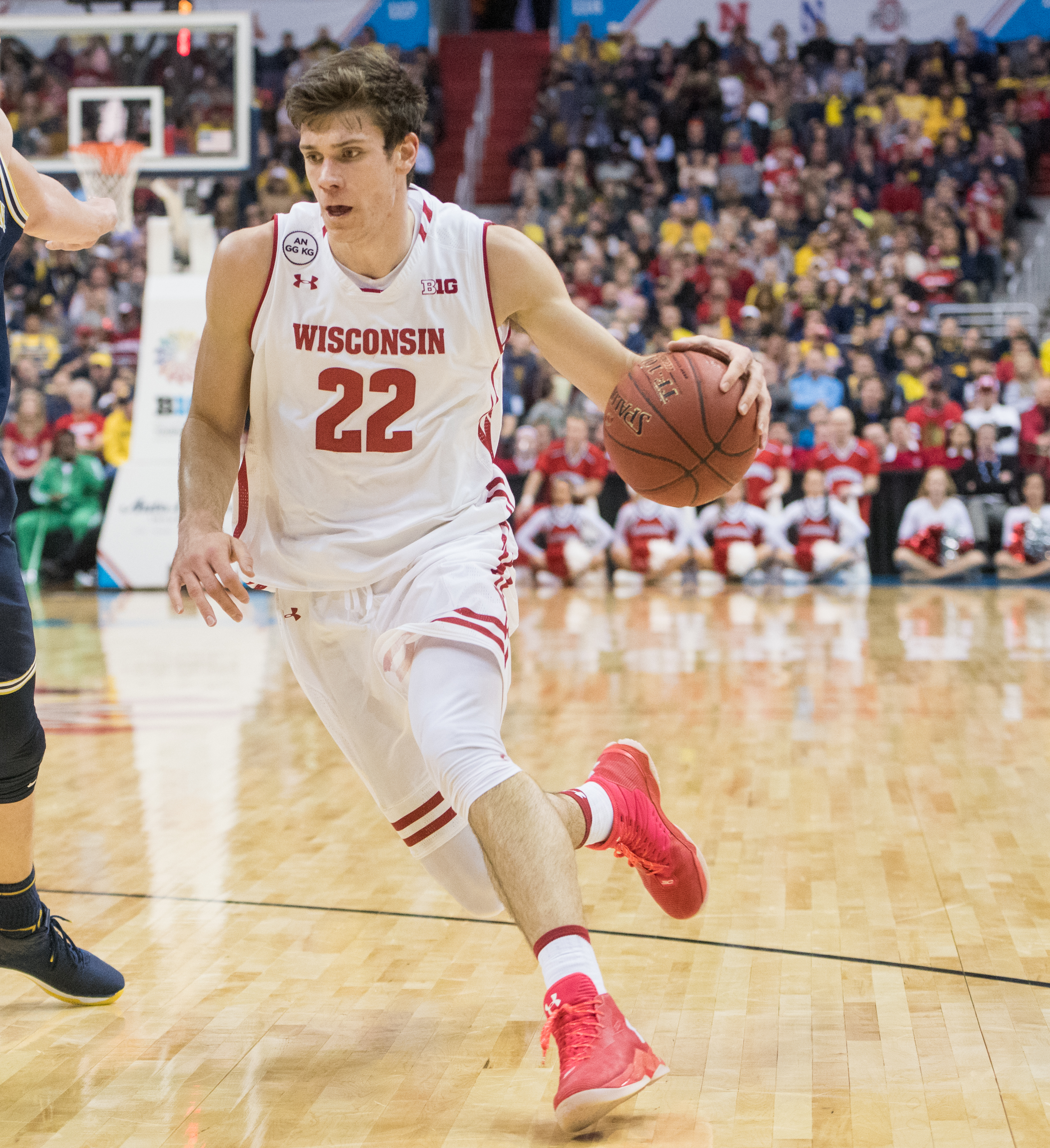
Happ in 2017

Despite not being listed in most mock drafts, Happ declared for the 2018 NBA draft without hiring an agent, giving him the option to return to college, which he later did.

On December 22, 2018, Happ grabbed his 1,000th career rebound in a win over Grambling State. On February 12, 2019, he scored his 2000th point, making him the first player in the Big Ten to score 2,000 points and collect 1,000 rebounds in 35 years. As a senior, Happ averaged 17.9 points, 10.3 rebounds, 4.6 assists, 1.0 steals and 1.2 blocks per game. Happ was the only player in NCAA during the 2018–19 season to lead their respective team in all 5 statistical categories.

== Professional career ==
=== Olympiacos (2019) ===
After not being selected in the 2019 NBA draft, Happ signed with the Chicago Bulls to play on their 2019 NBA Summer League team.

On July 18, 2019, Happ signed a two-year deal with the Greek EuroLeague club Olympiacos, of Piraeus, Greece, to play under head coach David Blatt.

=== Vanoli Cremona (2019–2020) ===
After appearing in only one game with Olympiacos, Happ was loaned on November 5, 2019, to the Italian League club Vanoli Cremona for the remainder of the 2019–20 season. On June 30, 2020, the Greek club officially announced that they had forfeited their contract option and Happ thus became a free agent. Happ averaged 18.3 points per game, 9.3 rebounds per game and 2.5 assists per game with Cremona.

=== Fortitudo Bologna (2020–2021) ===
Happ signed with Fortitudo Bologna of the Lega Basket Serie A on July 10, 2020. After suffering a left elbow injury, he was ruled out for three to four weeks on October 25.

=== Dinamo Sassari (2021) ===
At mid season, on January 18, 2021, Happ transferred from Fortitudo Bologna to Dinamo Sassari.

=== Riesen Ludwigsburg (2022) ===
On January 8, 2022, Happ signed with MHP Riesen Ludwigsburg of the Basketball Bundesliga (BBL).

=== Río Breogán (2022–2023) ===
On July 8, 2022, Happ signed with Río Breogán of the Spanish Liga ACB. He played all 34 league games, averaging 12.6 ppg, 7.9 rpg and 17.3 PIR per game, helping the team to a 10th-place finish and securing a European spot.

=== Gran Canaria (2023–2024) ===
After a lot of speculation about a possible move to Club Joventut Badalona or even a contract extension with CB Breogán, on June 29, 2023, Ethan Happ signed with EuroCup Basketball team Dreamland Gran Canaria for the 2023–24 ACB season.

=== Valencia (2024–2025) ===
On July 2, 2024, Happ signed with Valencia of the Liga ACB. On December 1, 2025, Happ was released from the Spanish club.

=== San Pablo Burgos (2025–2026) ===
On December 2, 2025, Happ signed with CB San Pablo Burgos of the Liga ACB.

=== La Laguna Tenerife (2026–present) ===
On July 11, 2026, Happ signed with La Laguna Tenerife of the Liga ACB.

== College statistics ==
Legend
GP	Games played	GS	Games started	MPG	Minutes per game
FG%	Field goal percentage	3P%	3-point field goal percentage	FT%	Free throw percentage
RPG	Rebounds per game	APG	Assists per game	SPG	Steals per game
BPG	Blocks per game	PPG	Points per game	**Bold**	Career high

Year	Team	GP	GS	MPG	FG%	3P%	FT%	RPG	APG	SPG	BPG	PPG
2014–15	Wisconsin	Redshirt										
2015–16	Wisconsin	35	35	28.1	.538	.000	**.643**	7.9	1.3	**1.8**	0.9	12.4
2016–17	Wisconsin	**37**	**37**	27.8	**.586**	.000	.500	9.0	2.8	**1.8**	**1.2**	14.0
2017–18	Wisconsin	33	33	30.8	.528	**.091**	.550	8.0	3.7	1.5	1.1	**17.9**
2018–19	Wisconsin	28	28	**32.4**	.540	.000	.441	**10.3**	**4.6**	1.0	**1.2**	**17.9**
Career		133	133	29.6	.548	.063	.540	8.7	3.0	1.6	1.1	15.4

== Career honors and awards ==
=== College career ===
- 2019 Second-team Consensus All-American (AP, NABC, SN, USBWA)
- 2019 Pete Newell Big Man Award
- 2019 Kareem Abdul-Jabbar Award
- 2018 First-Team All-Big Ten (media)
- 2017 Wooden Award Final Ballot
- 2017 Naismith Trophy Semifinalist
- 2017 Oscar Robertson Midseason Watch List
- 2017 Kareem Abdul-Jabbar Award Finalist
- 2017 Second-Team All-American (SI); Third Team All-American (USA Today, TSN)
- 2017 Big Ten Defensive Player of the Year (AP)
- 2017 First-Team All-Big Ten
- 2017 Big Ten All-Tournament Team
- 2016 Big Ten Freshman of the Year
- 2016 Third-Team All-Big Ten (media)
- 2016 Big Ten All-Freshman Team
- 2× USBWA All-District (2017, '18)
- 2× NABC All-District (2017 first team, 2018 second team)
- 2× Big Ten All-Defensive Team (2016, '17)
- 2× Big Ten Player of the Week

=== Professional career ===
- 2023 Liga ACB MVP of the month - March.

== Personal life ==
Happ's parents are Randy and Teresa Happ. His father Randy, played college basketball at North Central College (Division III), and his brother Eric, played college basketball at Carl Sandburg College (Junior College). Happ is a first cousin of former MLB pitcher J. A. Happ. Happ had roots from Sicily through his great-grandfather.

== See also ==
- List of NCAA Division I men's basketball players with 2,000 points and 1,000 rebounds
