= 2018–19 Michigan Wolverines men's basketball team =

American college basketball season

2018–19 Michigan Wolverines men's basketball

Hall of Fame Tip Off champions

NCAA tournament, Sweet Sixteen
- Conference: Big Ten Conference

Ranking
- Coaches: No. 11
- AP: No. 8
- Record: 30–7 (15–5 Big Ten)
- Head coach: John Beilein (12th season)
- Assistant coaches: Saddi Washington; DeAndre Haynes; Luke Yaklich
- MVP: Zavier Simpson
- Captains: Charles Matthews; Zavier Simpson
- Home arena: Crisler Center

2018–19 Big Ten Conference men's basketball standings
	Conf.				Overall
Team	W		L	PCT	W		L	PCT
No. 5 Michigan State †	16	–	4	.800	32	–	7	.821
No. 13 Purdue	16	–	4	.800	26	–	10	.722
No. 8 Michigan	15	–	5	.750	30	–	7	.811
No. 21 Wisconsin	14	–	6	.700	23	–	11	.676
Maryland	13	–	7	.650	23	–	11	.676
Iowa	10	–	10	.500	23	–	12	.657
Minnesota	9	–	11	.450	22	–	14	.611
Ohio State	8	–	12	.400	20	–	15	.571
Indiana	8	–	12	.400	19	–	16	.543
Penn State	7	–	13	.350	14	–	18	.438
Illinois	7	–	13	.350	12	–	21	.364
Rutgers	7	–	13	.350	14	–	17	.452
Nebraska	6	–	14	.300	19	–	17	.528
Northwestern	4	–	16	.200	13	–	19	.406
† 2019 Big Ten tournament winner Rankings from AP poll

The 2018–19 Michigan Wolverines men's basketball team represented the University of Michigan during the 2018–19 NCAA Division I men's basketball season. The Wolverines, led by head coach John Beilein in his twelfth year, played their home games for the 52nd consecutive year at the Crisler Center in Ann Arbor, Michigan. This season marked the program's 103rd season and its 102nd consecutive year as a member of the Big Ten Conference. They compiled a 30–7 overall record, 15–5 in the conference and finished in third place. In the Big Ten tournament, they defeated Iowa in the quarterfinals, Minnesota in the semifinals before losing to Michigan State in the championship. They received a at-large bid to the NCAA tournament, defeating Montana in the first round, Florida in the second round, but lost in the Sweet Sixteen to Texas Tech.

== Previous season ==
The Wolverines, who finished the 2017–18 season 33–8, were 13–5 in Big Ten play to finish in a tie for fourth. As the No. 5 seed in the Big Ten tournament, they defeated Iowa, Nebraska, Michigan State, and Purdue to win the tournament championship. As a result, they received the conference's automatic bid to the NCAA tournament. As the No. 3 seed in the West region, they defeated Montana, Houston, Texas A&M, and Florida State to advance to the Final Four. In the National semifinal, they defeated Loyola-Chicago before losing to Villanova in the championship game.

== Offseason ==
=== Departures ===
Muhammad-Ali Abdur-Rahkman, Duncan Robinson, and graduate transfer Jaaron Simmons graduated during their senior seasons for the 2017–18 Michigan Wolverines men's basketball team. On April 10, walk-on Brent Hibbitts announced that he would graduate and transfer with two years of eligibility remaining. On April 12, Ibi Watson announced his intention to transfer from the program. On April 14, Moritz Wagner declared for the 2018 NBA draft and hired an agent. On April 20, Charles Matthews declared for the 2018 NBA draft without hiring an agent. Matthews later withdrew his name from the draft and returned to school. On April 25, Watson, who had two years of eligibility remaining, announced he had agreed to transfer to Dayton and sit out a year. Hibbits transferred to play for head coach Dan Majerle at Grand Canyon.

Michigan Departures
Name	Number	Pos.	Height	Weight	Year	Hometown	Notes
Muhammad-Ali Abdur-Rahkman	12	G	6'4"	190	Sr	Allentown, PA	Graduated
Brent Hibbitts	0	F	6'8"	220	So	Hudsonville, MI	Transferred to Grand Canyon
Duncan Robinson	22	G/F	6'8"	215	RS Sr	New Castle, NH	Graduated
Jaaron Simmons	5	G	6'1"	185	RS Sr	Dayton, OH	Graduated
Moritz Wagner	13	F	6'11"	245	Jr	Berlin, Germany	Declared for NBA Draft
Ibi Watson	23	G/F	6'5"	200	So	Pickerington, OH	Transferred to Dayton

=== Expectations ===
Immediately following the NCAA tournament and before the April 22, 2018 NBA draft entry deadline, early rankings were put out by many services. Michigan was ranked by some: Sports Illustrated ranked them No. 4 with Wagner and Matthews both returning, while CBS Sports (No. 22), Yahoo! Sports (No. 12) and ESPN (No. 8) expected Wagner to go pro and ranked them lower. Sporting News expected both to go pro, but ranked Michigan No. 9. USA Today, who ranked Michigan No. 18, expected Wagner to leave and noted that Matthews may leave as well. Bleacher Report (No. 8) and Fox Sports (No. 14) did not clarify who they expected to return and ranked Michigan. NBC Sports omitted Michigan.

Immediately following the decisions of Wagner to enter the draft and Matthews to return, Michigan was ranked by ESPN (17) and CBS Sports (21).

Brazdeikis had the highest expectations among the incoming class from Yahoo! Sports and ESPN. USA Today expected Johns to be the brightest newcomer.

Sporting News was the earliest of preseason polls to be released (September 20) and included Michigan (#10) as the highest of three ranked Big Ten teams. In the preseason Big Ten Media poll, Michigan was ranked second, collecting 4 of the 28 first place votes.

Prior to the season Matthews was named to the 10-man preseason All-Big Ten team. He also was one of nine Big Ten players named to the preseason John R. Wooden Award watchlist and one of eight named to the preseason Naismith College Player of the Year watchlist.

=== 2018–19 recruits and personnel ===
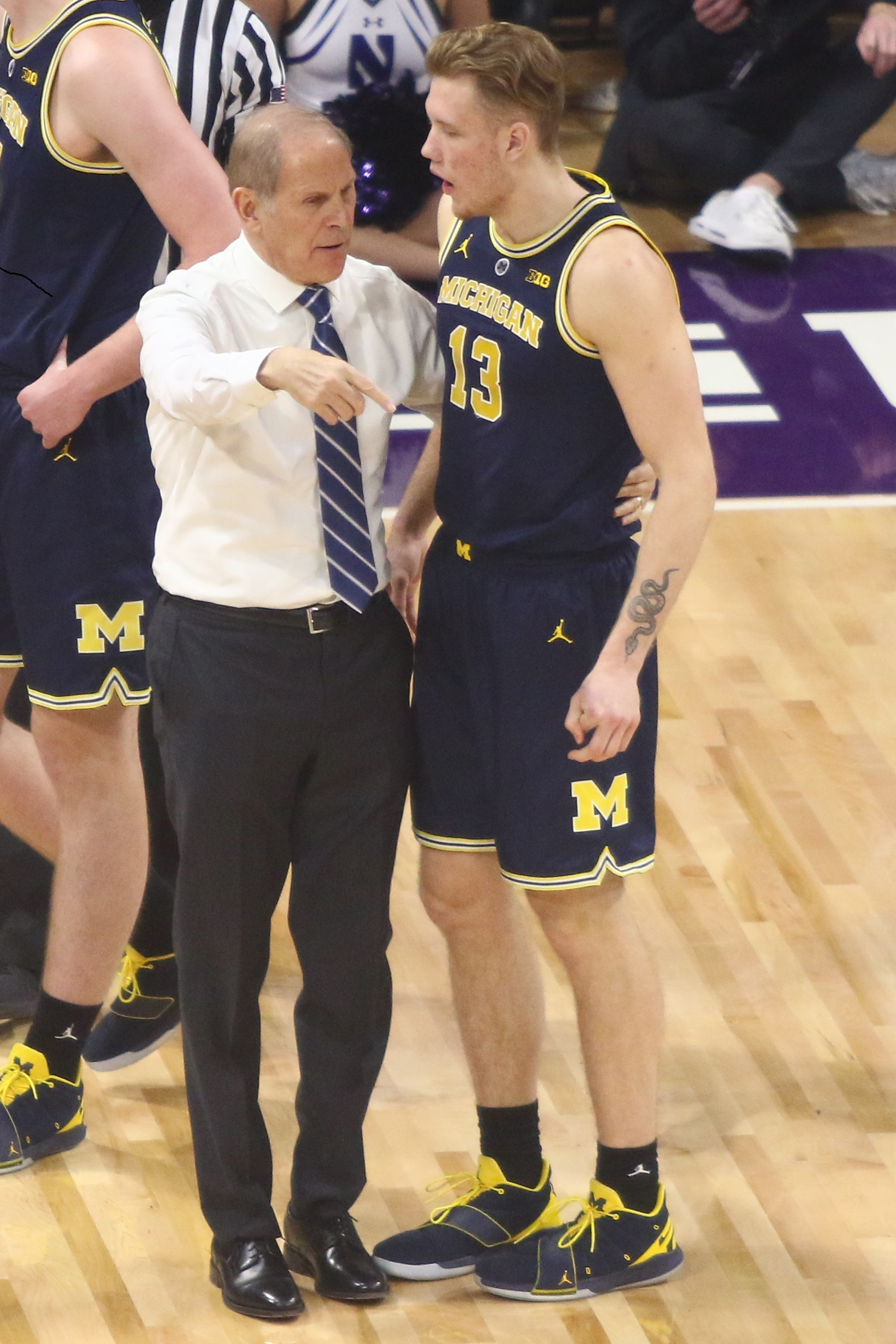
John Beilein and 2018–19 Big Ten Conference Freshman of the Year Ignas Brazdeikis

On December 22, 2016, junior recruit David DeJulius became the first commitment for the Class of 2018 after receiving a December 17 offer following his career-high 46-point, 7-rebound, 5-assist performance of December 17 in leading East English Village Preparatory Academy over Dakota High School. Brandon Johns became the second commitment for the Class of 2018 when he committed to Michigan on June 29, 2017, over several other schools including hometown Michigan State, along with fellow Big Ten universities Indiana, Iowa, and Purdue. At the time of his commitment, Johns was considered by several recruiting sites, such as 24/7Sports as well as ESPN, as the top recruit from Michigan in the Class of 2018.

On June 15, 2017, junior recruit Taylor Currie committed to Michigan becoming, at the time, their first commitment for the Class of 2019. On June 30, 2017, Currie announced that he would be reclassifying and would be set to join the Class of 2018 marking the third member of Michigan's 2018 recruiting class. On September 22, 2017, Ignas Brazdeikis became the fourth, member of the 2018 recruiting class. Brazdeikis, at time of commitment, was ranked in the top 50 in the 24/7Sports composite top 100 rankings for recruits of the class of 2018. Brazdeikis committed to Michigan over schools such as Vanderbilt and Florida. On September 29, 2017, Currie decommitted from Michigan dropping the number of 2018 recruits to three. On October 2, 2017, Adrien Nunez became the fourth member of the 2018 recruiting class. Nunez received much attention over the summer scouting period and drew praise for his shooting ability. Nunez committed to Michigan over schools such as Penn State, Texas A&M, and Boston College. On October 4, 2017, Michigan added its fifth recruit to the 2018 recruiting class with the addition of Colin Castleton. The big man selected Michigan over Illinois in making his final choice. Castleton noted his connection with new Michigan assistant coach Luke Yaklich as a driving force behind communication with Michigan.

Johns and DeJulius finished second and third in points (2,792 and 2,542, respectively), to Michigan State recruit Foster Loyer (3,691) in the 2018 Mr. Basketball of Michigan voting.

College recruiting
Name	Hometown	School	Height	Weight	Commit date
David DeJulius; PG	Detroit, MI	East English Village Preparatory Academy (MI)	6 ft 0.5 in (1.84 m)	190 lb (86 kg)	Dec 22, 2016
David DeJulius; PG	Recruit ratings: Scout: Rivals: 247Sports: ESPN:				
Brandon Johns; PF	East Lansing, MI	East Lansing High School (MI)	6 ft 8 in (2.03 m)	215 lb (98 kg)	Jun 29, 2017
Brandon Johns; PF	Recruit ratings: Scout: Rivals: 247Sports: ESPN:				
Ignas Brazdeikis; SF	Mono, ON	Orangeville Prep (ON)	6 ft 8 in (2.03 m)	220 lb (100 kg)	Sep 22, 2017
Ignas Brazdeikis; SF	Recruit ratings: Scout: Rivals: 247Sports: ESPN:				
Adrien Nunez; SG	Brooklyn, NY	St. Thomas More High School (NY)	6 ft 5 in (1.96 m)	175 lb (79 kg)	Oct 2, 2017
Adrien Nunez; SG	Recruit ratings: Scout: Rivals: 247Sports: ESPN:				
Colin Castleton; PF	Daytona Beach, FL	Father Lopez Catholic High School (FL)	6 ft 11 in (2.11 m)	215 lb (98 kg)	Oct 4, 2017
Colin Castleton; PF	Recruit ratings: Scout: Rivals: 247Sports: ESPN:				
Overall recruit ranking:
Note: In many cases, Scout, Rivals, 247Sports, On3, and ESPN may conflict in their listings of height and weight.; In these cases, the average was taken. ESPN grades are on a 100-point scale.; Sources: "Michigan 2018 Basketball Commitments". Rivals.; "2018 Michigan Basketball Commits". Scout.; "ESPN Recruiting Nation Basketball". ESPN.; "Scout.com Team Recruiting Rankings". Scout.; "2018 Team Ranking". Rivals.

=== Other personnel ===
On June 29, 2018, Michigan announced the addition of transfer, and preferred walk-on, Jaron Faulds who had played 26 games averaging 4.5 points and 3.2 rebounds as a freshman for the 2017–18 Columbia Lions after completing his four-year varsity career at Holt High School. Foulds had been first-team All-state (Michigan) as a senior in 2017 and was a former AAU teammate of Isaiah Livers. He is a 6 ft 10 in (2.08 m) center who must sit out one season.

== Roster ==
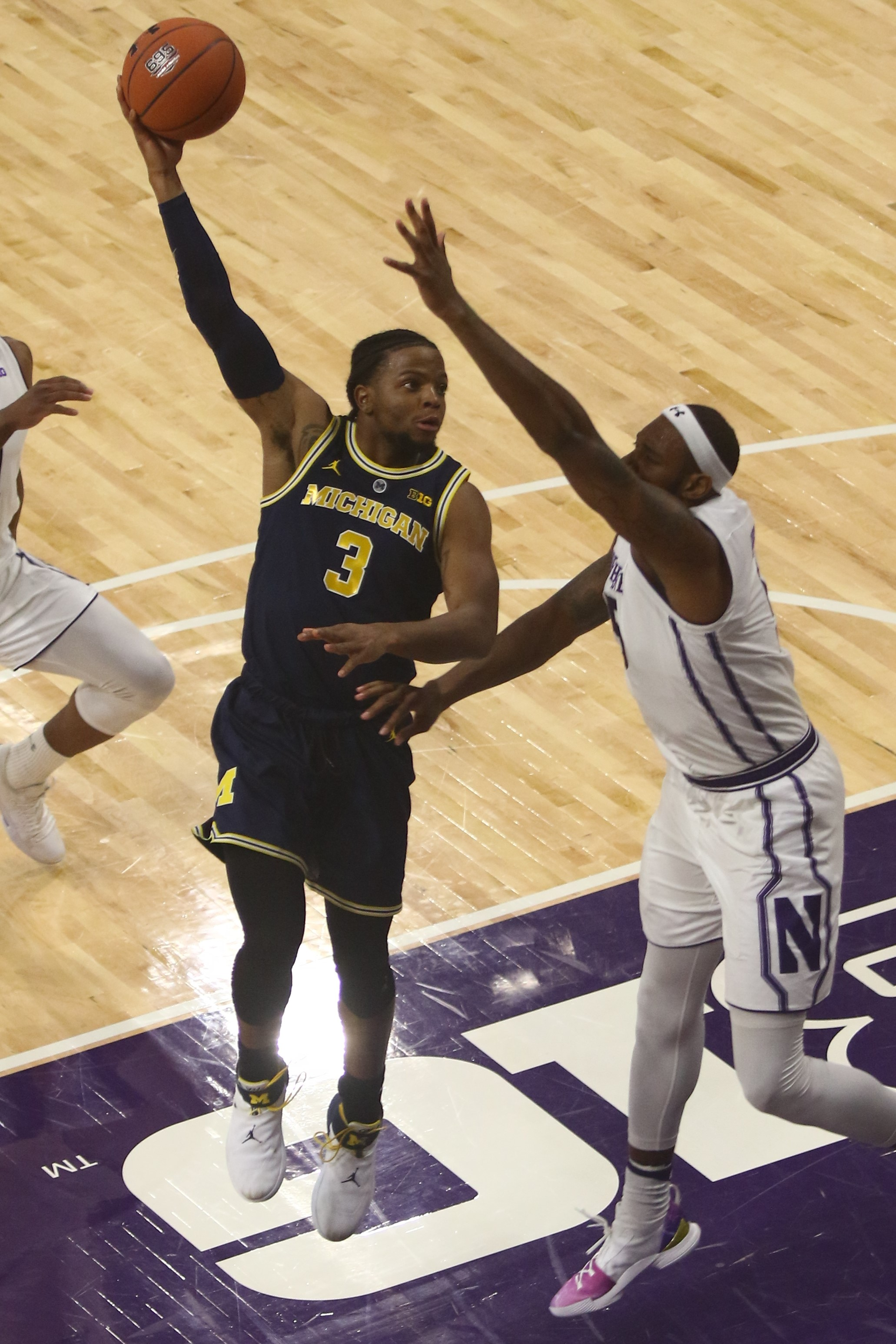
While serving as co-captain for the 2018–19 team, Zavier Simpson earned the nickname "Captain Hook" for making use of the hook shot.

Matthews and Simpson were named team captains.

2018–19 Michigan Wolverines men's basketball team
Players
Coaches

Pos.	#	Name	Height	Weight	Year	Hometown
G	0	David DeJulius	6 ft 0 in (1.83 m)	190 lb (86 kg)	Fr	Detroit, MI
G	1	Charles Matthews (C)	6 ft 6 in (1.98 m)	205 lb (93 kg)	Sr	Chicago, IL
G	2	Jordan Poole	6 ft 5 in (1.96 m)	195 lb (88 kg)	So	Milwaukee, WI
G	3	Zavier Simpson (C)	6 ft 0 in (1.83 m)	190 lb (86 kg)	Jr	Lima, OH
F	4	Isaiah Livers	6 ft 7 in (2.01 m)	235 lb (107 kg)	So	Kalamazoo, MI
G	5	Adrien Nunez	6 ft 6 in (1.98 m)	205 lb (93 kg)	Fr	Brooklyn, NY
C	11	Colin Castleton	6 ft 11 in (2.11 m)	210 lb (95 kg)	Fr	Daytona Beach, FL
F	13	Ignas Brazdeikis	6 ft 7 in (2.01 m)	215 lb (98 kg)	Fr	Mono, ON
G	14	Rico Ozuna-Harrison (W)	5 ft 11 in (1.8 m)	170 lb (77 kg)	So	Detroit, MI
C	15	Jon Teske	7 ft 1 in (2.16 m)	260 lb (118 kg)	Jr	Medina, OH
F	23	Brandon Johns	6 ft 8 in (2.03 m)	225 lb (102 kg)	Fr	East Lansing, MI
F	24	C.J. Baird (W)	6 ft 5 in (1.96 m)	220 lb (100 kg)	So	Novi, MI
F	32	Luke Wilson (W)	6 ft 0 in (1.83 m)	170 lb (77 kg)	So	Boulder, CO
F	44	Jaron Faulds (W) (redshirt)	6 ft 10 in (2.08 m)	225 lb (102 kg)	So	Holt, MI
F	51	Austin Davis	6 ft 10 in (2.08 m)	245 lb (111 kg)	RS Jr	Onsted, MI
G	55	Eli Brooks	6 ft 1 in (1.85 m)	185 lb (84 kg)	So	Spring Grove, PA

Head coach

- John Beilein (Wheeling)

Assistant coach(es)

- Saddi Washington (Western Michigan)
- DeAndre Haynes (Kent State)
- Luke Yaklich (Illinois State)

Legend

- (C) Team captain
- (S) Suspended
- (I) Ineligible
- (W) Walk-on
- Injured
- Current redshirt

Roster

=== Coaching staff ===
Name	Position	Year at Michigan	Alma mater (year)
Saddi Washington	Assistant coach	3rd	Western Michigan (1998)
DeAndre Haynes	Assistant coach	2nd	Kent State (2006)
Luke Yaklich	Assistant coach	2nd	Illinois State (1998)

== Rankings ==
Ranking movements Legend: ██ Increase in ranking ██ Decrease in ranking ( ) = First-place votes
	Week																				
Poll	Pre	1	2	3	4	5	6	7	8	9	10	11	12	13	14	15	16	17	18	19	Final
AP	19	18	9	7	5	5 (1)	4 (1)	2 (9)	2 (9)	2 (9)	2 (9)	2	5	5	7	6	7	9	7	10	8
Coaches'	18	18^	8	5	5 (1)	5 (3)	5 (3)	4 (4)	4 (4)	4 (6)	4 (6)	4	6	5	7	7	7	10	7	11	8

^Coaches did not release a week 2 poll

== Preseason ==
The team scheduled an August 17–26 trip to play three exhibition games and tour Barcelona and Madrid, Spain. The team defeated Madrid Generals 82–72 on August 20. On August 23 and 25, Michigan lost to KK Mega Bemax and Joventut Badalona. When the preseason AP Poll was released, Michigan was ranked number 19. On November 2, Michigan defeated Northwood 90–58 in an exhibition game with double digit scoring from all 5 starters, including 13 points from Charles Matthews and freshman Ignas Brazdeikis each.

== Regular season ==
The full schedule was announced on August 21. The marquee games are a home game against North Carolina in the ACC-Big Ten Challenge and a road game against Villanova in the Gavitt Tipoff Games. The season will mark the first time in Big Ten history that the teams will play a 20-game conference schedule. During their next six-year cycle, teams within the same state will play 12 times, while teams within the same region will play 10 times. All other teams will play nine times. In addition, there will be three in-state series played between Illinois and Northwestern, Indiana and Purdue, and Michigan and Michigan State. Each time will play twice, guaranteeing a home game for each team. The conference opponent list was finalized on April 19, 2018.

On August 31, 2016, it was announced that Michigan would participate in the 2018 Hall of Fame Tip Off at the Mohegan Sun Arena in Uncasville, Connecticut on November 17 and 18. On September 6, 2017, the three other participants for the tournament were announced: George Washington, Providence, and South Carolina.

Michigan once again participated in the Gavitt Tipoff Games where they faced defending national champion Villanova in Philadelphia as a rematch of the 2018 national title game.

=== November ===
Michigan began the season with a 63–44 victory over Norfolk State. Michigan was led by Jon Teske with a game-high 13 points, eight rebounds, and a then career-high four blocks, while freshman Ignas Brazdeikis scored 12 points in his Michigan debut. With the win, John Beilein earned his 800th career win. On November 10, Michigan defeated Holy Cross 56–37. Michigan was led by Charles Matthews with a game-high 20 points, while Brazdeikis added 19 points, including 15 points in the first five minutes to start the second half. Teske added another five blocks. On November 14, Michigan defeated (#8 AP Poll/#8 Coaches Poll) Villanova 73–46 in the Gavitt Tipoff Games. Michigan was led by Matthews with a game-high 19 points, while Brazdeikis added 18 points, and a team-high seven rebounds. Michigan's defense forced 21 turnovers, including five steals by Zavier Simpson. On November 17, Michigan defeated George Washington 84–61. Michigan was led by Matthews with a game-high 25 points, while Jordan Poole added a then career-high 22 points, and Simpson added 14 points and 11 rebounds for his first career double-double. This marked the first time Michigan had two 20-point scorers in the same game since March 22, 2018. The next day Michigan defeated Providence 66–47 to win the Hall of Fame Tip Off tournament. Michigan was led by Brazdeikis with a game-high 20 points, while Teske added a career-high 17 points, including his first career three-pointer. On November 23, Michigan defeated Chattanooga 83–55. Michigan was led by Brazdeikis with a career-tying 20 points, while Teske added seven points and a career-high 12 rebounds. On November 28, Michigan defeated (#11/#13) North Carolina 84–67 in the ACC–Big Ten Challenge, as Michigan shot a season-high 57.4 percent from the field, and tied a season-best with 50-percent from three-point range. Michigan was led by Brazdeikis with a career-high 24 points, while Matthews added 21 points and a team-high seven rebounds, Poole added 18 points, and Teske added a career-high five blocks.

=== December ===
On December 1, Michigan defeated (#19/#18) Purdue 76–57 in its Big Ten Conference season opener. Michigan was led by Poole with a game-high 21 points, including 5-for-5 from three-point range, while Teske added a career-tying 17 points. Michigan's offense shot 50% on three point shots again and its defense held Purdue to 35.5% shooting, 26 points below their season average. Michigan's 19-point win marked the largest margin of victory over Purdue since 1997. On December 3, Poole was recognized as Big Ten Player of the Week and Brazdeikis was recognized as Big Ten Freshman of the Week for their performances against these two ranked teams. On December 4, Michigan defeated Northwestern 62–60. Michigan was led by Brazdeikis with a game-high 23 points, his fourth 20-point game of the season. After eight straight wins by 17 points or more and taking a 15-point lead with 17:19 remaining only to give up Northwestern's first lead with 6:24 remaining, Michigan needed late game heroics for the first time. Poole, who had 15 points, contributed an assist with 2:30 remaining and a dunk that provided the final margin of victory with 1:53 remaining. On December 8, Michigan defeated South Carolina 89–78. Michigan was led by Poole with a career-high 26 points, while Brazdeikis added 17 points. Brazdeikis was recognized as Co-Big Ten Freshman of the week on December 10. On December 15, Michigan defeated Western Michigan 70–62. Michigan was led by Matthews with 25 points and 10 rebounds, for his fifth career double-double and first of the season, while Poole added 14 points and a career-high four steals. On December 22, Michigan defeated Air Force 71–50. Michigan was led by Brazdeikis with 19 points, while Matthews added 17 points and a game-high seven rebounds. Michigan's defense forced 20 turnovers, with nine coming off steals, including four steals by Simpson. With the win, Michigan improved to 12–0 on the season for the third time in program history, and their best start to the season since going 16–0 in 2012–13. On December 30, Michigan defeated Binghamton 74–52. Michigan was led by Brazdeikis with a game-high 21 points, while Poole added 18 points, including a career-high six three-pointers, and Simpson added a career-high 10 assists, and one rebound shy of a double-double. The following day, Brazdeikis earned Big Ten Freshman of the week recognition for the third time in December.

=== January ===
On January 3, Michigan returned to Big Ten play with a 68–55 victory over Penn State. Brazdeikis posted his first career double-double with 16 points and a career-high 11 rebounds, while Poole added a team-high 17 points and Matthews added 14 points. Michigan's defense forced 18 turnovers, including eight steals and six blocks. On January 6, Michigan defeated (#21/#22) Indiana 74–63. Michigan was led by Matthews and Poole with 18 points each, while Brandon Johns added a career-high eight points and eight rebounds. On January 10, Michigan defeated Illinois 79–69. Michigan was led by Simpson with a season-high 16 points, while Teske added 13 points and 11 rebounds, for his third career double-double, and first of the season. All five starters for Michigan recorded double-digit points for the first time since November 13, 2017. With the win, the Wolverines improved to 16–0 on the season, matching the 2012–13 and 1985–86 teams for the best start to a season. On January 13, Michigan, who last lost to the national champion 2017–18 Villanova Wildcats, defeated Northwestern to establish a school record for best start at 17–0 and tied the 1984–85 team's 17-game win streak that was stopped by the eventual national champion 1984–85 Villanova Wildcats. The victory came on the strength of a career-high 24-point effort by Simpson and career-tying 17 points by Teske, who posted his second consecutive double-double (11 rebounds). On January 19, Michigan lost to Wisconsin 64–54, snapping their winning streak. Michigan was led by Teske with a team-high 15 points, while Poole added 14 points, and Simpson added 10 points and 11 rebounds, for his second career double-double. On January 22, Michigan defeated Minnesota 59–57 after a buzzer beater by Matthews. Michigan was led by Brazdeikis with a game-high 18 points and career-tying 11 rebounds, for his second double-double of the season, while Teske added 15 points and five rebounds. On January 25, Michigan defeated Indiana 69–46. Michigan was led by Brazdeikis with a game-high 20 points, while Matthews added 10 points and a career-tying 11 rebounds for his sixth career double-double. Michigan jumped out to a 17–0 lead and its defense allowed only 18 points in the first half, as Indiana shot a season-low 27.6% from the field during the game. The 23-point victory marked the largest ever by Michigan on the road against Indiana. On January 28, Brazdeikis earned his fourth Big Ten Freshman of the Week recognition for his performances against Minnesota and Indiana. This surpassed Tim Hardaway Jr. and Nik Stauskas and established a new school record for most such awards. On January 29, Michigan defeated Ohio State 65–49. Michigan was led by Poole with a game-high 15 points, while Simpson added 11 points, 10 rebounds and a career-high 12 assists, becoming the sixth player in Michigan program history to record a triple-double. The game marked Simpson's 100th career game with Michigan, becoming the 70th Wolverine to the reach the milestone. Simpson recorded his 300th career assist, becoming the 15th Wolverine to reach the milestone. Michigan's defense held Ohio State under 50 points for the first time since 1949.

=== February ===
On February 1, Michigan lost to Iowa 74–59, as Michigan committed 20 fouls, tying a season high, and shot a season-low 32.3 percent from the field. Michigan was led by Brazdeikis and Poole with 16 points each. On February 5, Michigan defeated Rutgers 77–65. Michigan was led by Brazdeikis with a game-high 23 points, including a career-high five three-pointers. With the win, John Beilein passed Johnny Orr for the most Big Ten wins as Michigan head coach with 121. On February 9, Michigan defeated (#19/#19) Wisconsin 61–52. Michigan was led by Matthews with a game-high 18 points, while Teske added a career-tying 17 points and 12 rebounds, for his third double-double of the season. On February 12, Michigan lost to Penn State 75–69. Michigan was led by Matthews with 24-points, while Poole added 17 points. Head coach John Beilein was ejected from the game after receiving back-to-back technical fouls for arguing with officials just before halftime. On February 16, Michigan defeated (#24/#25) Maryland 65–52. Michigan was led by Matthews with 14 points, while Brazdeikis added 13 points and Simpson added 12 points and eight assists. Michigan's defense forced 16 Maryland turnovers, marking the 20th game this season in which they have forced 10 or more turnovers. The win marked the Wolverines sixth victory over a ranked opponent this season. The win marked Michigan's 22nd consecutive home victory. On February 21, Michigan defeated Minnesota 69–60. Michigan was led by Poole with a game-high 22 points, while Teske added a career-tying 17 points and five blocks, and Simpson added five points and a season-high 12 assists. Michigan's defense held Minnesota to 18 points in the first half, tied for the fewest points Michigan has allowed in a half this season. On February 24, Michigan lost their rivalry game against (#10/#11) Michigan State 77–70, their first home loss of the season. Michigan was led by Simpson with 19 points, while Brazdeikis added 16 points and nine rebounds, and Teske added 10 points and a game-high 11 rebounds, for his fourth double-double of the season. On February 28, Michigan defeated Nebraska 82–53 in their final home game of the season. Michigan was led by Teske with a career-high 22 points and 10 assists, his second consecutive game with a double-double, and his fifth of the season. Brazdeikis added 20 points, Livers added 12 points and 10 assists, for his first career double-double in his first start of the season, replacing an injured Matthews, and Colin Castleton added a career-high 11 points and three rebounds. This marked the first time Michigan had two 20-point scorers in the same game since November 28, 2018.

=== March ===
On March 3, Michigan defeated (#17/#20) Maryland 69–62, as all five Wolverine starters finished the game with double-digit points. Michigan was led by Brazdeikis with a game-high 21 points, while Simpson added 12 points and 10 assists for his third double-double of the season, and Teske added 11 points and 10 rebounds, for his third consecutive game with a double-double, and sixth of the season. On March 9 with a share of the 2018–19 Big Ten regular season title on the line, Michigan lost to (#9/#11) Michigan State 75–63, in their final game of the regular season. Michigan was led by Brazdeikis with 20 points, while Poole added 15 points. Michigan led by as many as 12 points late in the first half, however, Michigan State used a 20–2 run in the second half to take their first lead of the game, and eventually win the game. Michigan finished the season in third place, one game behind Michigan State and Purdue.

== Postseason ==
=== Big Ten tournament ===
On March 15, Michigan opened its 2019 Big Ten Conference men's basketball tournament play with a 74–53 victory over Iowa in the quarterfinals. Michigan was led by Brazdeikis with a game-high 15-points, while Teske added 12 points, 10 rebounds and two blocks for his eighth career double-double, and Simpson added 10 points and 11 assists for his fourth career double-double. Michigan's defense held Iowa to 35.6% shooting (21-of-59) from the field, including 6.3% (1-for-16) from three-point range. The win marked the Wolverines ninth consecutive win in the Big Ten Conference men's basketball tournament, setting a tournament record.

The next day Michigan defeated Minnesota 76–49 in the semifinals of the Big Ten tournament, as Michigan shot 51.6% (32-of-62) from the field. Michigan was led by Livers with a career-high 21 points, while Simpson added 15 points and a game-high nine assists, and Brazdeikis added 13 points. With the win, Michigan advanced to the Big Ten tournament final for the third consecutive season. With nine assists in the game, Simpson became the 10th Wolverine to surpass 400 career assists. The win marked Beilein's 20th Big Ten tournament victory, becoming the third coach in tournament history to reach the milestone.

On March 17, Michigan lost to Michigan State 65–60 in the finals of the Big Ten tournament. Michigan was led by Brazdeikis with 19 points, while Poole added 13 points, and Teske added 10 points and 10 rebounds for his second double-double of the tournament. Michigan led by as many as 13 points early in the second half, but Michigan State went on a 13–4 run to tie the game at 48 with just over seven minutes remaining. The Spartans finished the game on a 10–0 run in the final two minutes of the game to secure the victory. The loss snapped Michigan's record-setting 10 game Big Ten tournament winning streak. Simpson finished the tournament with a tournament-record 30 assists in three games, surpassing the previous record of 29 assists set by Mateen Cleaves in 1999. Brazdeikis and Simpson were both named to the All-Tournament Team.

=== NCAA tournament ===
On March 21, Michigan began their participation in the 2019 NCAA tournament with a 74–55 victory over Montana in the first round for the second consecutive year. Michigan was led by Matthews with a game-high 22 points and 10 rebounds, for his seventh career double-double, while Brazdeikis added 14 points, Teske added 11 points and nine rebounds, and Poole added 10 points. Simpson posted 10 assists in the game for the eighth time this season, setting a single-season program record for the most games with 10 or more assists. Michigan's defense held the Grizzlies to 33.3% shooting, while forcing 10 turnovers, as Montana missed 13 of its first 16 shots in the first half.

On March 23, Michigan defeated Florida 64–49 in the second round. Michigan was led by Poole with a game-high 19 points, including four three-pointers, while Simpson added nine points, nine rebounds and nine assists, one point, rebound and assist shy of his second career triple-double. Michigan's defense held Florida to 34.5% shooting for the game, including 28.6% shooting in the second half, while their 49 points was a season-low for the Gators. With the win, Michigan advanced to the Sweet 16 for the third consecutive season, and earned their fifth 30-win season in program history.

On March 28, Michigan lost to (#9/#10) Texas Tech 63–44 in the Sweet Sixteen, as only five players scored for the Wolverines. Michigan was led by Brazdeikis with 17 points and a career-high 13 rebounds, for his third career double-double, while Matthews added 12 points. The Raiders defense held Michigan to just 16 field goals, 32% shooting and only a single three-point basket on 19 attempts, with the lone three-pointer coming from C.J. Baird. The Wolverines finished the season with a 30–7 record, for its second consecutive 30-win season.

== Schedule and results ==
Date time, TV	Rank^{#}	Opponent^{#}	Result	Record	High points	High rebounds	High assists	Site (attendance) city, state
Spain Summer Tour
August 20, 2018*		Madrid Generals	W 82–72	–	17 – Brazdeikis	–	–	Pabellon Amaya Veladmoro; Madrid
August 23, 2018*		KK Mega Bemax	L 73–81	–	16 – Poole	–	–	Pavelló Esportiu Municipal; Barcelona
August 25, 2018*		Joventut Badalona	L 79–85	–	15 – Tied	–	–	Pavelló Esportiu Municipal; Barcelona
Exhibition
November 3, 2018*; 7:00 pm, BTN Plus	No. 19	Northwood	W 90–58	–	13 – Tied	8 – Livers	7 – Tied	Crisler Center (11,748); Ann Arbor, MI
Regular season
November 6, 2018*; 8:30 pm, BTN	No. 19	Norfolk State; Hall of Fame Tip Off campus game	W 63–44	1–0	13 – Teske	8 – Tied	5 – Simpson	Crisler Center (10,109); Ann Arbor, MI
November 10, 2018*; 7:30 pm, BTN Plus	No. 19	Holy Cross; Hall of Fame Tip Off campus game	W 56–37	2–0	20 – Matthews	10 – Livers	7 – Simpson	Crisler Center (12,355); Ann Arbor, MI
November 14, 2018*; 6:30 pm, FS1	No. 18	at No. 8 Villanova; Gavitt Tipoff Games	W 73–46	3–0	19 – Matthews	7 – Brazdeikis	6 – Simpson	Finneran Pavilion (6,501); Villanova, PA
November 17, 2018*; 12:00 pm, ESPN3	No. 18	vs. George Washington; Hall of Fame Tip Off Naismith semifinals	W 84–61	4–0	25 – Matthews	11 – Simpson	8 – Simpson	Mohegan Sun Arena (7,231); Uncasville, CT
November 18, 2018*; 1:30 pm, ESPN	No. 18	vs. Providence; Hall of Fame Tip Off Naismith championship	W 66–47	5–0	20 – Brazdeikis	7 – Brazdeikis	8 – Simpson	Mohegan Sun Arena (6,825); Uncasville, CT
November 23, 2018*; 4:00 pm, BTN	No. 9	Chattanooga	W 83–55	6–0	20 – Brazdeikis	12 – Teske	3 – Matthews	Crisler Center (12,010); Ann Arbor, MI
November 28, 2018*; 9:00 pm, ESPN	No. 7	No. 11 North Carolina; ACC–Big Ten Challenge	W 84–67	7–0	24 – Brazdeikis	7 – Matthews	6 – Simpson	Crisler Center (12,707); Ann Arbor, MI
December 1, 2018; 3:30 pm, ESPN	No. 7	No. 19 Purdue	W 76–57	8–0 (1–0)	21 – Poole	8 – Teske	7 – Simpson	Crisler Center (12,707); Ann Arbor, MI
December 4, 2018; 9:00 pm, BTN	No. 5	at Northwestern	W 62–60	9–0 (2–0)	23 – Brazdeikis	10 – Teske	5 – Simpson	Welsh–Ryan Arena (7,039); Evanston, IL
December 8, 2018*; 12:00 pm, FS1	No. 5	South Carolina	W 89–78	10–0	26 – Poole	9 – Teske	7 – Simpson	Crisler Center (12,709); Ann Arbor, MI
December 15, 2018*; 2:00 pm, BTN	No. 5	Western Michigan	W 70–62	11–0	25 – Matthews	10 – Matthews	3 – Simpson	Crisler Center (12,707); Ann Arbor, MI
December 22, 2018*; 4:00 pm, BTN	No. 4	Air Force	W 71–50	12–0	19 – Brazdeikis	7 – Matthews	7 – Simpson	Crisler Center (12,707); Ann Arbor, MI
December 30, 2018*; 12:00 pm, BTN	No. 2	Binghamton	W 74–52	13–0	21 – Brazdeikis	9 – Simpson	10 – Simpson	Crisler Center (12,707); Ann Arbor, MI
January 3, 2019; 7:00 pm, ESPN	No. 2	Penn State	W 68–55	14–0 (3–0)	17 – Poole	11 – Brazdeikis	5 – Simpson	Crisler Center (12,707); Ann Arbor, MI
January 6, 2019; 4:30 pm, CBS	No. 2	No. 21 Indiana	W 74–63	15–0 (4–0)	18 – Tied	8 – Johns	3 – Simpson	Crisler Center (12,707); Ann Arbor, MI
January 10, 2019; 8:00 pm, FS1	No. 2	at Illinois	W 79–69	16–0 (5–0)	16 – Simpson	11 – Teske	8 – Simpson	State Farm Center (10,770); Champaign, IL
January 13, 2019; 7:30 pm, BTN	No. 2	Northwestern	W 80–60	17–0 (6–0)	24 – Simpson	11 – Teske	4 – Simpson	Crisler Center (12,707); Ann Arbor, MI
January 19, 2019; 12:00 pm, ESPN	No. 2	at Wisconsin	L 54–64	17–1 (6–1)	15 – Teske	10 – Simpson	6 – Teske	Kohl Center (17,287); Madison, WI
January 22, 2019; 7:00 pm, BTN	No. 5	Minnesota	W 59–57	18–1 (7–1)	18 – Brazdeikis	11 – Brazdeikis	2 – Tied	Crisler Center (12,707); Ann Arbor, MI
January 25, 2019; 6:30 pm, FS1	No. 5	at Indiana	W 69–46	19–1 (8–1)	20 – Brazdeikis	11 – Matthews	5 – Simpson	Simon Skjodt Assembly Hall (17,222); Bloomington, IN
January 29, 2019; 9:00 pm, ESPN2	No. 5	Ohio State	W 65–49	20–1 (9–1)	15 – Poole	10 – Simpson	12 – Simpson	Crisler Center (12,707); Ann Arbor, MI
February 1, 2019; 7:00 pm, FS1	No. 5	at Iowa	L 59–74	20–2 (9–2)	16 – Tied	8 – Tied	7 – Simpson	Carver–Hawkeye Arena (15,056); Iowa City, IA
February 5, 2019; 8:00 pm, BTN	No. 7	at Rutgers	W 77–65	21–2 (10–2)	23 – Brazdeikis	7 – Simpson	7 – Simpson	Louis Brown Athletic Center (8,000); Piscataway, NJ
February 9, 2019; 12:00 pm, FOX	No. 7	No. 19 Wisconsin	W 61–52	22–2 (11–2)	18 – Matthews	12 – Teske	5 – Simpson	Crisler Center (12,707); Ann Arbor, MI
February 12, 2019; 8:30 pm, BTN	No. 6	at Penn State	L 69–75	22–3 (11–3)	24 – Matthews	7 – Livers	4 – Tied	Bryce Jordan Center (9,120); University Park, PA
February 16, 2019; 12:00 pm, FOX	No. 6	No. 24 Maryland	W 65–52	23–3 (12–3)	14 – Matthews	6 – Matthews	8 – Simpson	Crisler Center (12,707); Ann Arbor, MI
February 21, 2019; 7:00 pm, ESPN	No. 7	at Minnesota	W 69–60	24–3 (13–3)	22 – Poole	9 – Matthews	12 – Simpson	Williams Arena (11,084); Minneapolis, MN
February 24, 2019; 3:45 pm, CBS	No. 7	No. 10 Michigan State; Rivalry	L 70–77	24–4 (13–4)	19 – Simpson	11 – Teske	2 – Tied	Crisler Center (12,707); Ann Arbor, MI
February 28, 2019; 7:00 pm, ESPN	No. 9	Nebraska	W 82–53	25–4 (14–4)	22 – Teske	10 – Tied	10 – Simpson	Crisler Center (12,707); Ann Arbor, MI
March 3, 2019; 3:45 pm, CBS	No. 9	at No. 17 Maryland	W 69–62	26–4 (15–4)	21 – Brazdeikis	10 – Teske	10 – Simpson	Xfinity Center (17,950); College Park, MD
March 9, 2019; 8:00 pm, ESPN	No. 7	at No. 9 Michigan State; Rivalry	L 63–75	26–5 (15–5)	20 – Brazdeikis	4 – Brazdeikis	5 – Simpson	Breslin Center (14,797); East Lansing, MI
Big Ten tournament
March 15, 2019; 9:30 pm, BTN	(3) No. 10	vs. (6) Iowa; Quarterfinals	W 74–53	27–5	15 – Brazdeikis	10 – Teske	11 – Simpson	United Center (18,575); Chicago, IL
March 16, 2019; 2:30 pm, CBS	(3) No. 10	vs. (7) Minnesota; Semifinals	W 76–49	28–5	21 – Livers	8 – Teske	9 – Simpson	United Center (18,468); Chicago, IL
March 17, 2019; 3:30 pm, CBS	(3) No. 10	vs. (1) No. 6 Michigan State; Championship	L 60–65	28–6	19 – Brazdeikis	10 – Teske	10 – Simpson	United Center (18,615); Chicago, IL
NCAA tournament
March 21, 2019*; 9:20 pm, TNT	(2 W) No. 8	vs. (15 W) Montana; First Round	W 74–55	29–6	22 – Matthews	10 – Matthews	10 – Simpson	Wells Fargo Arena (16,360); Des Moines, IA
March 23, 2019*; 5:15 pm, CBS	(2 W) No. 8	vs. (10 W) Florida; Second Round	W 64–49	30–6	19 – Poole	10 – Teske	9 – Simpson	Wells Fargo Arena (16,770); Des Moines, IA
March 28, 2019*; 9:40 pm, CBS	(2 W) No. 8	vs. (3 W) No. 9 Texas Tech; Sweet Sixteen	L 44–63	30–7	17 – Brazdeikis	13 – Brazdeikis	3 – Tied	Honda Center (16,145); Anaheim, CA
*Non-conference game. ^{#}Rankings from AP Poll. (#) Tournament seedings in parentheses. W=West. All times are in Eastern Time.

== Honors ==
=== In-season honors ===
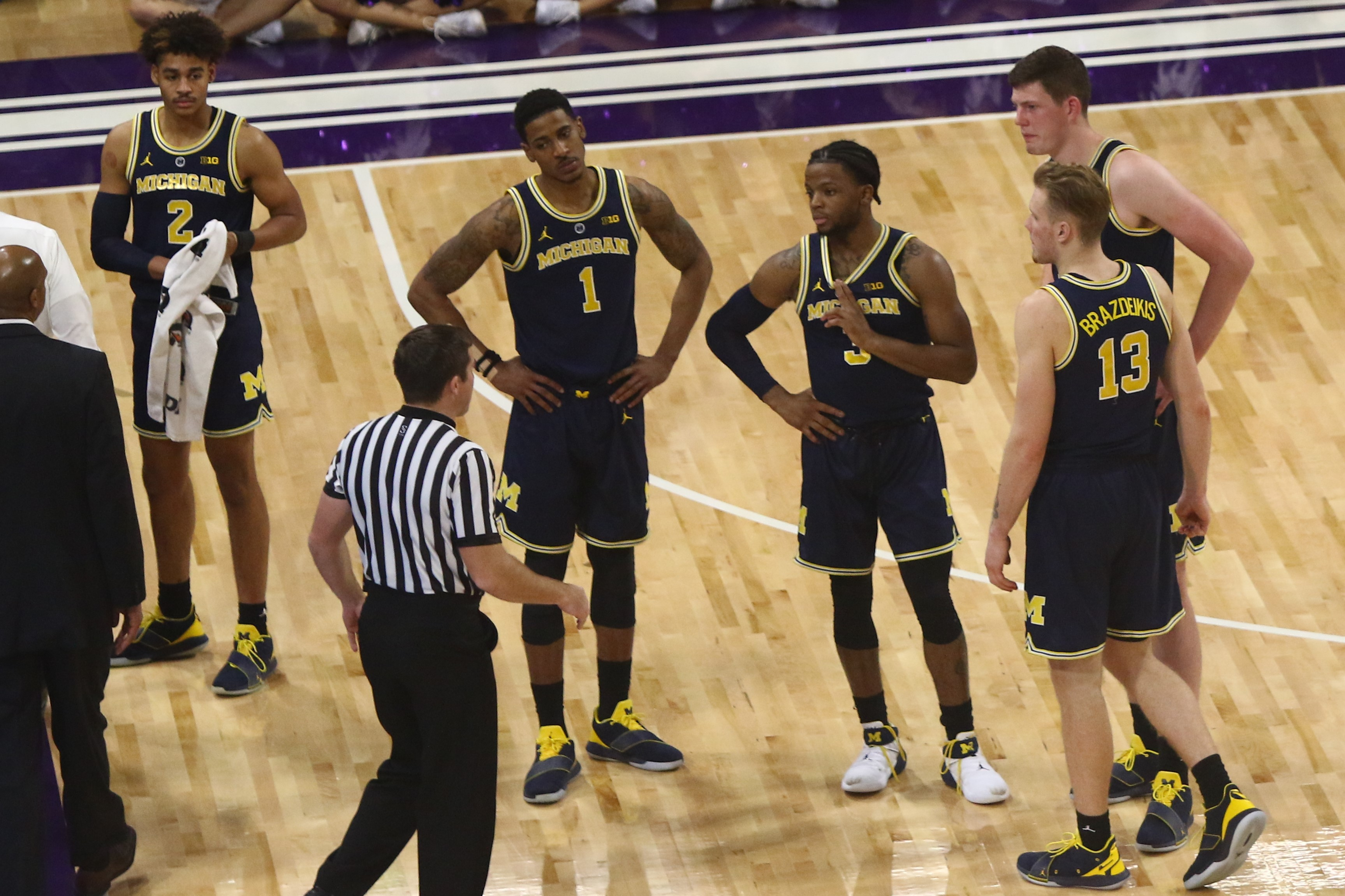
The starting five for the 2018–19 team (left to right, #2 Jordan Poole, #1 Charles Matthews, #3 Zavier Simpson, Jon Teske and #13 Ignas Brazdeikis)

On January 9, Ignas Brazdeikis was one of seven Big Ten players named to the Midseason Top 25 John R. Wooden Award watchlist. On January 22, Simpson was one of four Big Ten athletes named to the Naismith Defensive Player of the Year Award Top 15 midseason watchlist. On February 5, Brazdeikis was one of four Big Ten athletes named to the Wooden Award Late Season Top 20 Watch List. On February 6, Matthews was the only Big Ten athlete named a Julius Erving Award Top 10 finalist. The following day, Brazdeikis was one of two Big Ten athletes (along with Jordan Murphy) named a Karl Malone Award Top 10 finalist. The entire starting lineup earned All-Big Ten recognition: Brazdeikis and Zavier Simpson earned 2nd team honors (coaches and media), while Jordan Poole (coaches and media), Jon Teske (coaches and media) and Charles Matthews (media) were named honorable mention. Brazdeikis was an All-Freshman selection and the Big Ten Freshman of the Year, while Simpson was an All-Defensive team selection. It was Michigan's first time with 5 All-Big Ten honorees since the 1984–85 Michigan Wolverines. Brazdeikis and Simpson were selected to the 2019 Big Ten Conference men's basketball tournament All-Tournament team.

=== Team players drafted into the NBA ===
Jordan Poole was drafted 28th overall in the first round of the 2019 NBA draft by the Golden State Warriors. Ignas Brazdeikis was drafted 47th overall in the 2019 NBA draft by the Sacramento Kings.

Year	Round	Pick	Overall	Player	NBA Club
2019	1	28	28	Jordan Poole	Golden State Warriors
2019	2	17	47	Ignas Brazdeikis	Sacramento Kings
2021	2	12	42	Isaiah Livers	Detroit Pistons
