= Adrien Nunez =

Influencer, singer, songwriter, former college basketball player

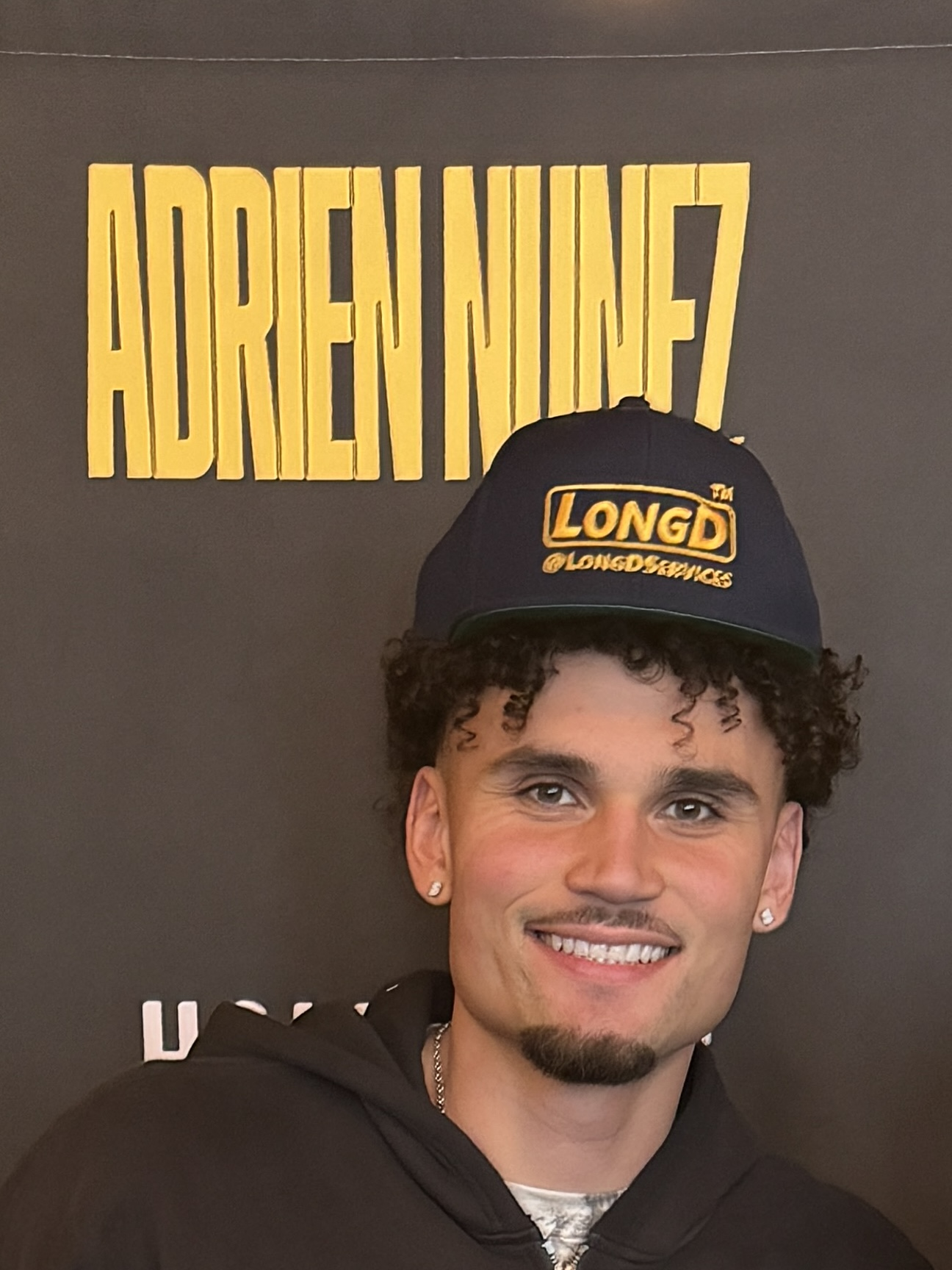
- Nunez in 2025
- Born: May 14, 1999 (age 27); New York City, U.S.
- Education: University of Michigan
- Occupations: Influencer; singer-songwriter
- Years active: 2021–present
- Musical career
- Genres: Country; pop; hip hop
- Labels: Warner Music Nashville; Warner Records; Sony Music Publishing

Instagram information
- Page: adriennunez
- Followers: 696 thousand

TikTok information
- Page: adriennunez
- Followers: 6.5 million
- Last updated: May 24, 2026
- Basketball career

Personal information
- Listed height: 6 ft 6 in (1.98 m)
- Listed weight: 220 lb (100 kg)

Career information
- High school: Millennium (Manhattan, New York); Bishop Loughlin (Brooklyn, New York); St. Thomas More (Oakdale, Connecticut)
- College: Michigan (2018–2022)
- NBA draft: 2022: undrafted

Career history
- 2023: Metros de Santiago

Adrien Nunez (Note: Also spelled Adrien Nuñez and Adrien Núñez) (born May 14, 1999) is an American social media influencer, singer-songwriter, and former college basketball player.

He was a high school basketball player at Bishop Loughlin Memorial High School in Fort Greene, Brooklyn. He excelled during his postgraduate year garnering many scholarship offers and earning accolades at St. Thomas More School in Oakdale, Connecticut. He was part of a highly rated class during his 2018–19 freshman year for the Michigan Wolverines men's basketball team of the Big Ten Conference. As a student athlete and a Wolverines member, Nunez earned three consecutive Academic All-Big Ten recognitions and went to three NCAA Division I men's basketball tournament Sweet Sixteen rounds.

Despite his limited role on the basketball court, he became the team's most popular social media creator during the COVID-19 pandemic. The June 2021 Supreme Court National Collegiate Athletic Association v. Alston ruling prior to his senior season, which made student athlete compensation permissible, helped Nunez to attract many high-profile corporate sponsors and partners and make him one of the highest paid college athletes. After graduating, he began promoting other country music musicians through his social media platform and then he started releasing his own music. Within three months of his new music release, Billboard announced he was signed to the Warner Music Nashville and Warner Records music labels. He subsequently continued to release music and appeared on music tours as well as at music festivals. He has supported tour-headliners such as Luke Bryan and Myles Smith. He has also signed record contracts with Sony Music Publishing and William Morris Endeavor.

== Youth ==
Nunez was born to a Dominican-American family of Jenny Lessard and Martin Nunez in Manhattan, New York. Martin owns a food market chain. They later moved to Brooklyn. His maternal grandfather was a classical composer and his maternal grandmother was a trained singer. Nunez's father, who was a teenage immigrant to New York City from the Dominican Republic, was a bassist in several 1990s and 2000s bands, most notably the Spanish language alt rock Espuelas de Bronce. A few years later the family moved from the Lower East Side to Brooklyn. As a youth, Nunez was a skateboarder, snowboarder, and video gamer before picking up a basketball in seventh grade. He played on his middle school basketball team and then attended Millennium High School in Lower Manhattan for his freshman year, where he played a year of basketball before transferring to Bishop Loughlin Memorial High School.

At Bishop Loughlin, he averaged 4.8 points per game in the primary role of screener and undersized big man on a 2017 New York Catholic High School Athletic Association semifinalist team led by Keith Williams and Markquis Nowell who had also played for Bishop Loughlin. Other teammates at Bishop Loughlin included Julian Champagnie and Justin Champagnie who would graduate in 2019. Upon graduation, Nunez had only one NCAA Division II basketball scholarship offer from Assumption University in Worcester, Massachusetts. He did attract strong interest from future Michigan Wolverines assistant coach Phil Martelli, who wanted to recruit him at Saint Joseph's in Philadelphia. However, he decided to study for a postgraduate year at St. Thomas More Prep in Connecticut.

The play of Nunez on the Amateur Athletic Union (AAU) circuit earned him Division I mid-major offers from Fordham and Bowling Green. Soon, more offers came in, including Atlantic 10 Conference schools VCU and Saint Joseph's, and Penn State, his first high major offer. By the time Michigan entered the fray, Nunez had received offers from fellow "power conference" teams, Texas A&M and Boston College. In addition, Nunez had multiple offers from Ivy League basketball programs. He committed to Michigan in early October 2017 following his official visit to Ann Arbor. At St. Thomas More, he averaged 15.5 points per game and 5 rebounds, earning 2018 All-NEPSAC AAA first team honors. He finished his high school career as the 305th-ranked basketball player, and 62nd best shooting guard, in the national class of 2018 per 247Sports' composite rating.

== College basketball ==
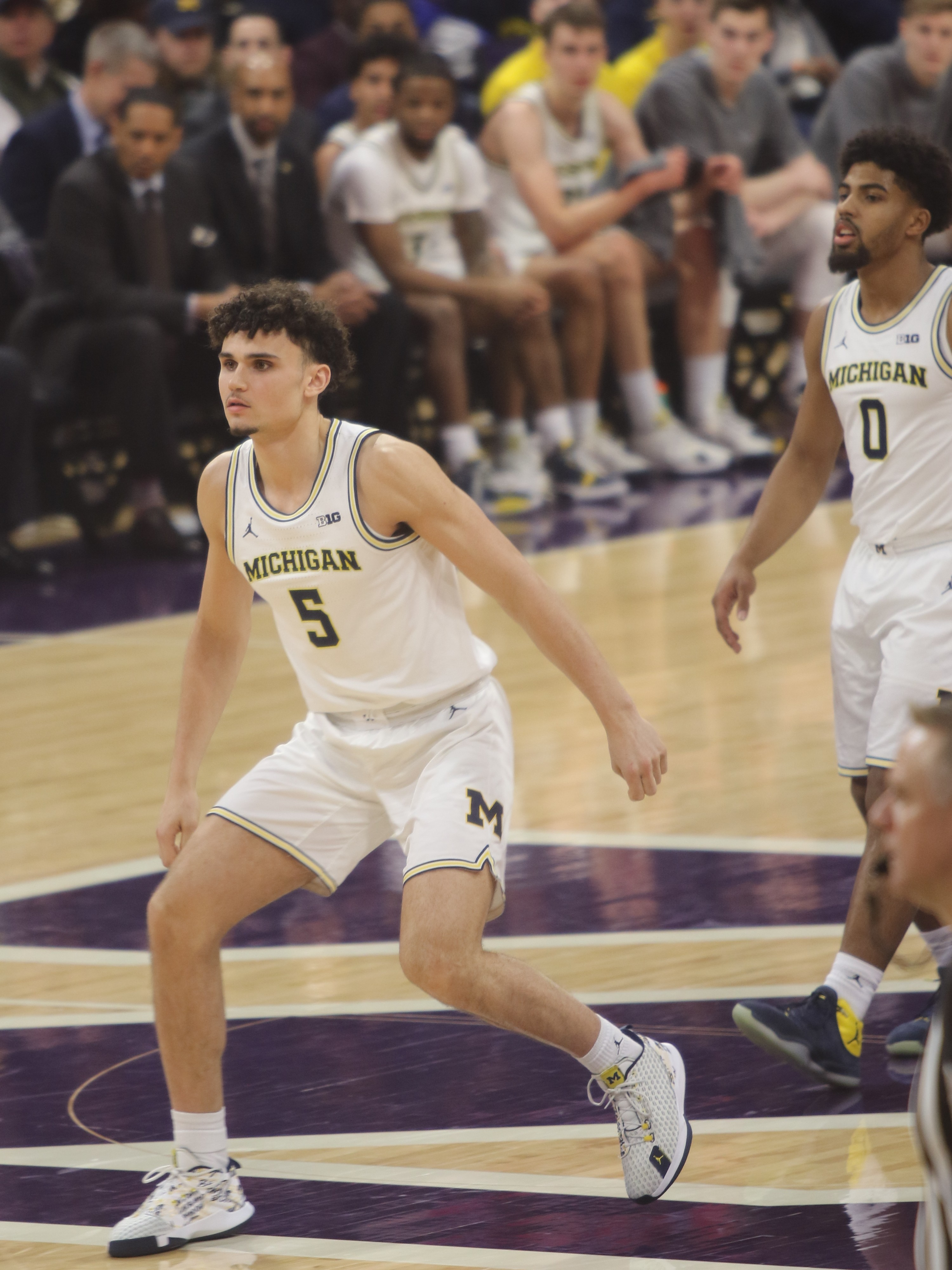
Nunez wearing number 5 for the 2019–20 Wolverines; David DeJulius in number 0. February 2020

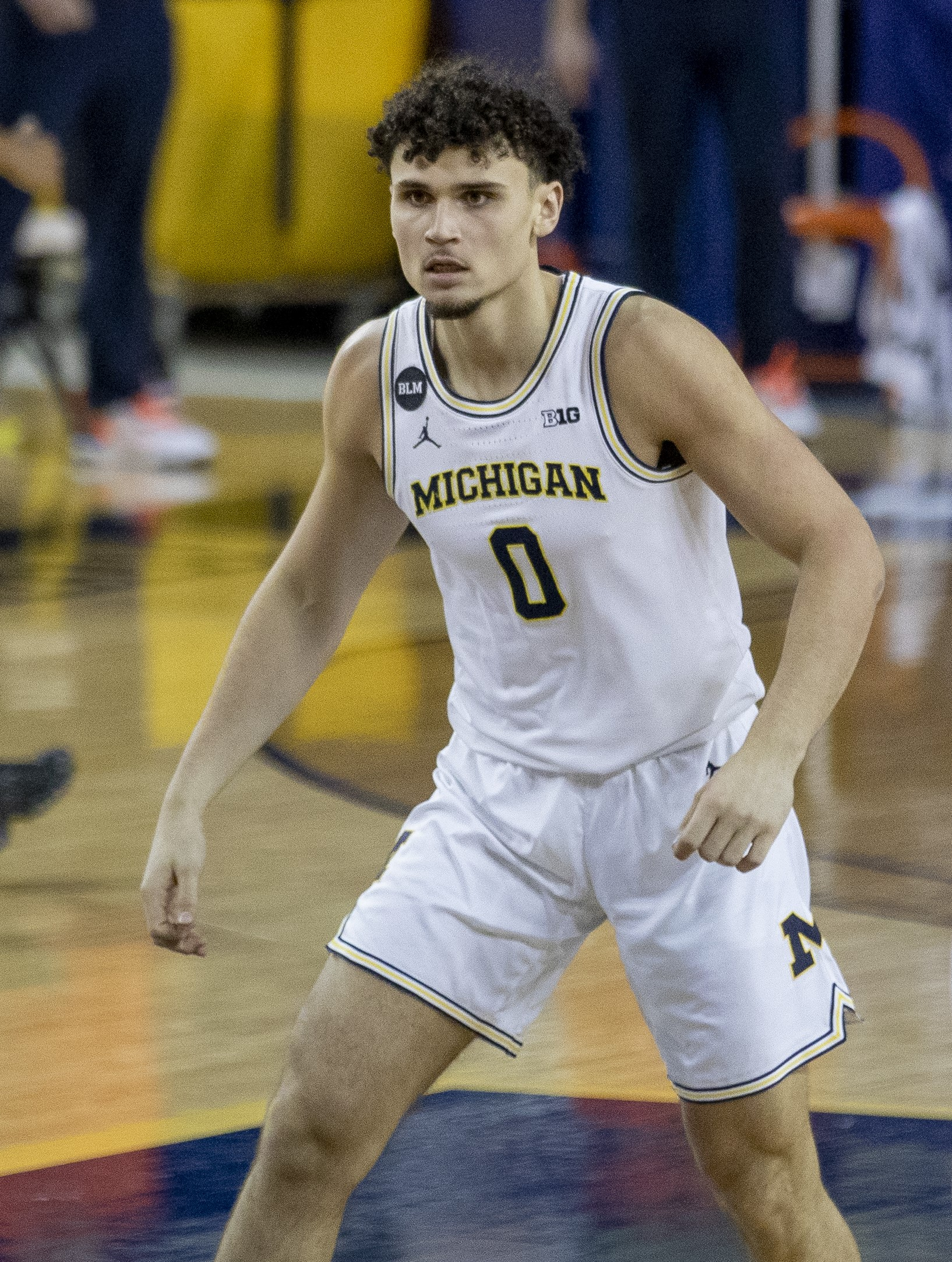
Nunez wearing number 0 for the 2020–21 Wolverines, March 2021

Nunez visited the Michigan Wolverines team on September 29, 2017, gave a verbal commitment on October 2, and signed a National Letter of Intent on November 10, to join the 2018–19 Michigan Wolverines. Nunez committed to join the 2018–19 Michigan Wolverines who were, upon his joining, defending, back-to-back, Big Ten men's basketball tournament champions, as well as the defending men's national runners-up.

Nunez played for Michigan from 2018–2022, a part of the 2020–21 Wolverines that earned the 2020–21 Big Ten Conference men's basketball season championship and reached its third, fourth, and fifth consecutive NCAA Division I men's basketball tournament Sweet Sixteens. Nunez earned individual honors as a student athlete with three consecutive Big Ten Conference All-Academic recognitions.

As a freshman, he played in 20 games and only scored 3 points, but with the departure of Jordan Poole, Brazdeikis, and Charles Matthews as well as the 2019 coaching change from John Beilein to Juwan Howard, Nunez had an opportunity for a more prominent role as a sophomore. When Franz Wagner was out of the 2019–20 Wolverines' lineup for four games, Nunez started in his place; his first collegiate starts, including scoring a career high 8 points on November 22, 2019, against Houston Baptist College. After Wagner returned to full health and the starting lineup, Nunez struggled with his shooting and his defense, resulting in a limited role. He made 22 appearances, and averaged 7.6 minutes and two points per game on 30.8% shooting from the field.

Following his sophomore season, Nunez opted to stay with Michigan rather than entering the NCAA transfer portal. Nunez would play a role as a scout team member, primarily, during his final two seasons. In sum, as an upperclassman, he played 65 minutes over 20 games, ten in both his junior and senior seasons, and scored 14 points.

Nunez played professionally for Dominican Republic basketball team Metros de Santiago in 2023. He appeared in one game for six minutes.

== Social media ==
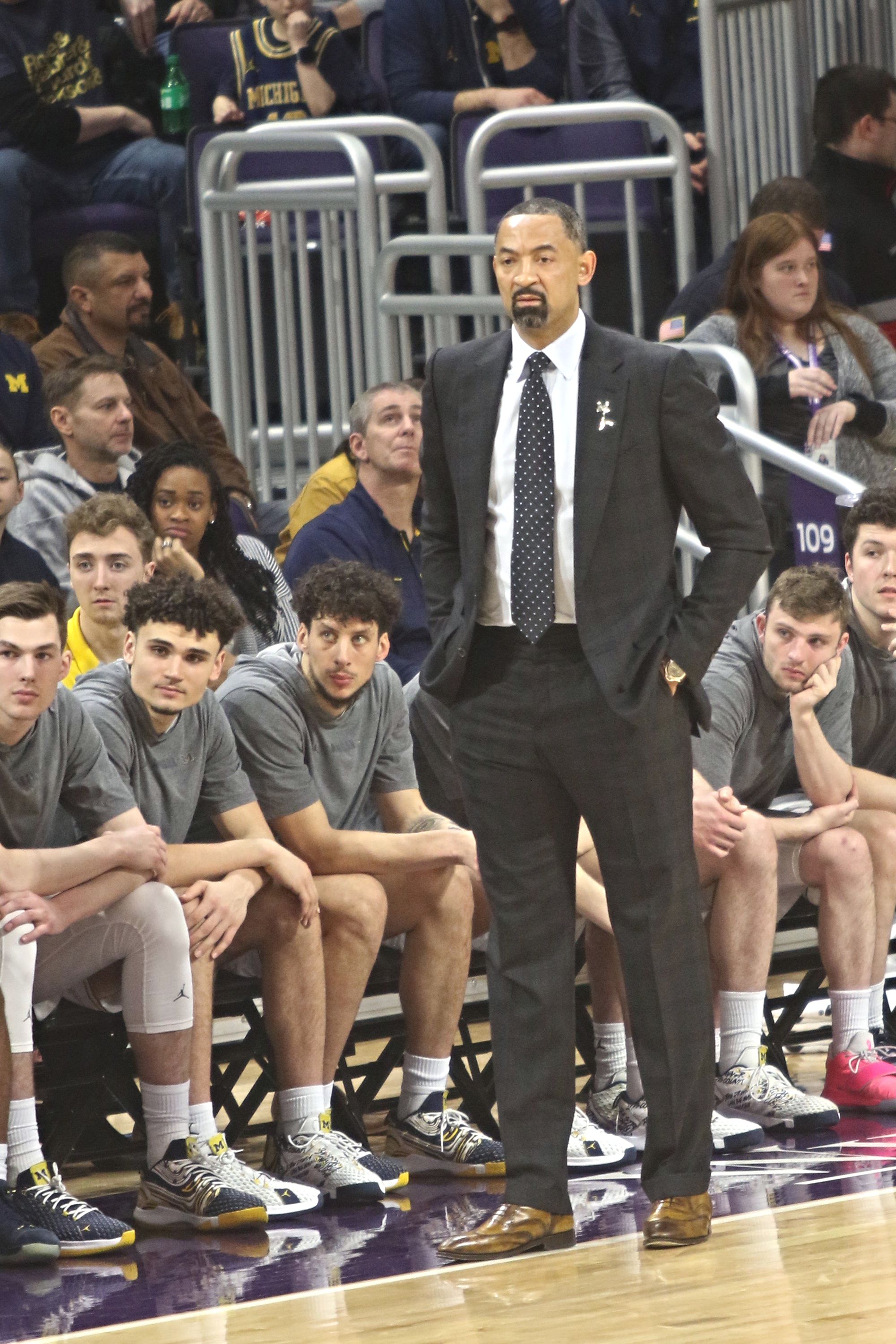
After Juwan Howard (standing) became Michigan's coach, Nunez (second to the left of Howard) never thought of transferring. Feb. 2020 (Colin Castleton left of Nunez)

Despite a limited role on the court, Nunez became his team's most followed player on TikTok and Instagram after posting his first TikTok video on January 13, 2020, and becoming active on social media during the COVID-19 pandemic. By May 2020, he had over 40,000 TikTok followers. One of his earliest viral videos was a video featuring him and Mike Smith that attained over 3 million views with music by Lil Yachty and an appearance by Zeb Jackson. After the Supreme Court of the United States ruling in the 2021 National Collegiate Athletic Association v. Alston case, student athlete compensation, such as payment for name, image, and likeness (NIL), became allowable for NCAA scholarship athletes beginning on July 1, 2021. Within months, he became the highest earning player on his team despite having never played more than four minutes in a game the prior season and having limited prospects for playing time behind Eli Brooks, Caleb Houstan, Kobe Bufkin, Zeb Jackson, and Terrance Williams.

As a senior for the 2021–22 NCAA Division I men's basketball season, he became one of the highest earning NIL players in the country, earning more than eventual NBA draft lottery pick Jaden Ivey, although Nunez played less than five minutes per game as a senior and averaged less than a point per game for his career (61 points in 62 games). After graduating he began promoting country music such artists as Shaboozey, Graham Barham, and Avery Anna. When the single "A Bar Song (Tipsy)" earned a RIAA certified platinum status, Nunez stated Shaboozey's label credited him by giving him a platinum plaque. The song had a record setting run on the Billboard Hot 100, surpassing in chart leaderboards such musicians as Carrie Underwood's "Jesus, Take the Wheel" and "Old Town Road" by Lil Nas X featuring Billy Ray Cyrus.

== Music ==
His earliest musical influences, which were heavy metal music bands Metallica, Pantera, and Iron Maiden, can be attributed to his dad. He drifted towards pop music and aspired to be like the Jonas Brothers. Nunez' early musical career influences are a mix of country, pop and hip-hop. On August 29, 2024, Nunez released his debut single "Low Road". In August 2024, his early work was noted for its Shazam traction in South Africa. By this time, Nunez had moved from Los Angeles to Nashville. He made his stage debut on September 25 in Nashville two days before releasing a collaborative version of "Low Road" with Avery Anna. In October 2024, Nunez released "Minnesota". On October 9, MusicRow announce he had signed with William Morris Endeavor for exclusive representation. He was added to the C2C: Country to Country music festival lineup in the same month. By October, he announced that he would tour in support of Dasha in November 2024 and Avery Anna that December.

In late November 2024, Nunez signed to Warner Music Nashville and Warner Records, following the viral success of "Low Road". He achieved 50 million views and 5 million streams in his first days as a creative artist as well as hundreds of thousands of new TikTok followers. On the other hand, Nunez claims the 5 million figure is attributed only to Spotify (a claim republished by Sports Illustrated) and across all platforms the total number of streams reached 10 million. Nunez's debut song on a major label, "Apology Song", was released by the time of the announcement of his signing.

On January 9, Nunez alongside country artist Zach Top were predicted among the 50 selectees to the Shazam Fast Forward 2025 Artists based on the assessment and insights of trends on Shazam's data and algorithms. On January 17, Amazon Music placed him on the list of "2025 Artists to Watch". By the end of the month, Hits magazine listed him as a supporting act for Myles Smith and named Spring 2025 as an expected release date for his debut album. On January 27, Luke Bryan announced his Summer 2025 Country Song Came On Tour supporting acts, which included Nunez on several of the summer dates. In mid-February, Nunez announced the Adrien Nunez Low Road World Tour, which included his first ever U.S. headline run (with special guest Brody Clementi) as well as European dates in support of Smith and three C2C festival dates. On July 23, 2025, Nunez signed a global publishing administration agreement with Sony Music Publishing Nashville. On July 25, he released the single "WILD". On September 25, 2025, Nunez was included in the April 25–27, 2026 Stagecoach Festival lineup. On February 3, 2026 Nunez was announced on the roster of the February 13, 2026 NBA All-Star Celebrity Game as part of the 2026 NBA All-Star Game weekend. Nunez debuted "Two Steppin'", a collaboration with Diplo during Diplo's close-out Stagecoach performance in front of over 65,000. On June 17, Nunez made his debut at the Grand Ole Opry,
