= Jon Teske =

American basketball player (born 1997)

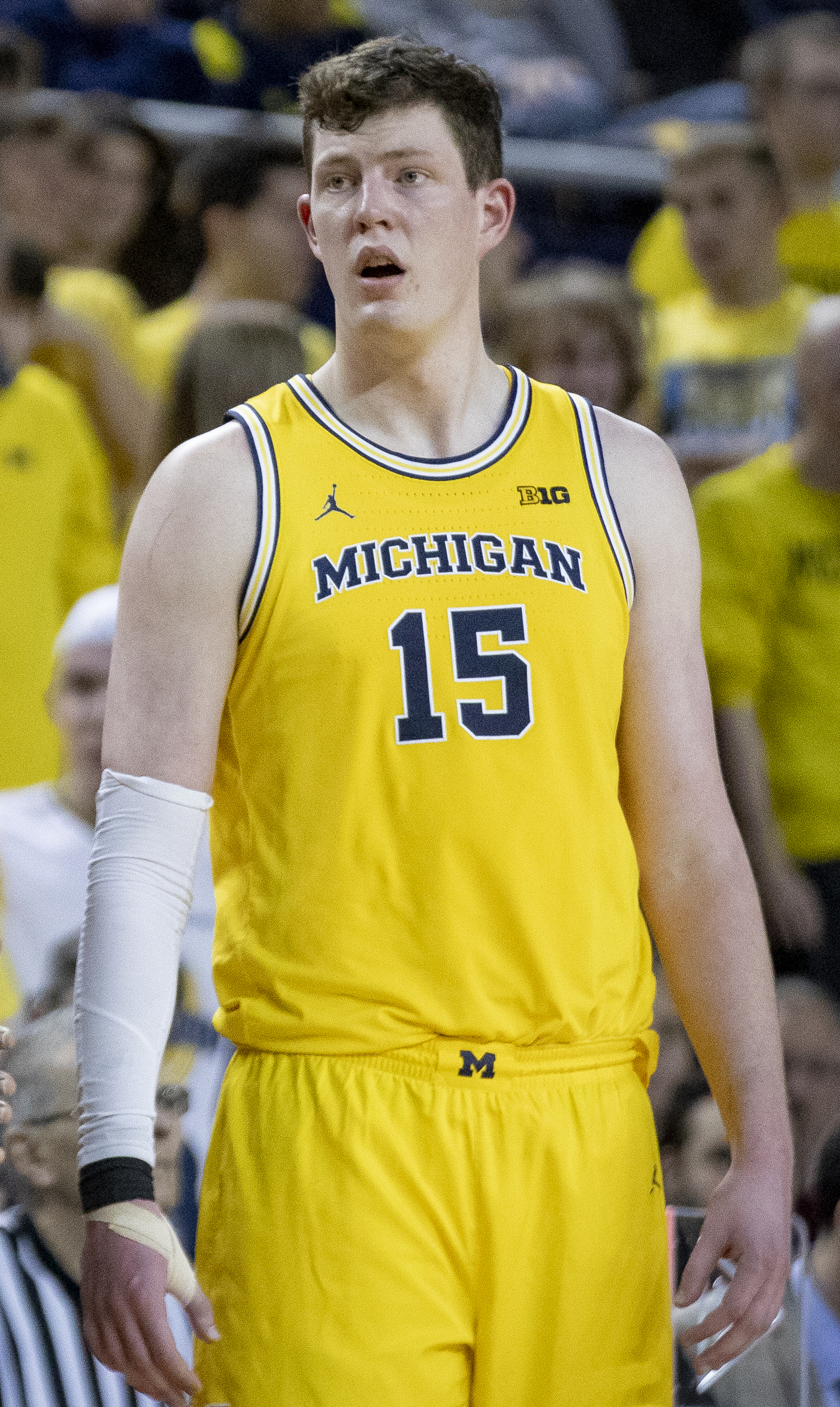
- Teske for the 2019–20 Michigan Wolverines

Personal information
- Born: May 4, 1997 (age 29) Indianapolis, Indiana, U.S.
- Listed height: 7 ft 1 in (2.16 m)
- Listed weight: 265 lb (120 kg)

Career information
- High school: Medina (Medina, Ohio)
- College: Michigan (2016–2020)
- NBA draft: 2020: undrafted
- Playing career: 2021–2022
- Position: Center
- Number: 10

Career history
- 2021–2022: Lakeland Magic
- 2022: Memphis Grizzlies

Career highlights
- NBA G League champion (2021)
- Stats at NBA.com
- Stats at Basketball Reference

Jon Teske (born May 4, 1997) is an American former professional basketball player. He played college basketball for the Michigan Wolverines. He was part of the 2017–18 team that reached the Championship Game of the 2018 NCAA Division I men's basketball tournament. Teske was a member of 2017 and 2018 Big Ten Conference men's basketball tournament champions during his first two seasons.

Teske was not selected in the 2020 NBA draft and signed with the Orlando Magic for training camp. He was waived before the start of the season and joined their NBA G League affiliate, the Lakeland Magic, with whom he won a championship with in 2021. Teske joined Belgian team Filou Oostende in March 2021, but left the team before playing a single game. He re-joined Orlando for training camp in September 2022 and played again for Lakeland after getting waived in October. Teske also spent time with the Memphis Grizzlies on a 10-day contract in January 2022. He retired from professional basketball after the 2021–22 season.

== High school career ==
Teske lived in the Grand Rapids, Michigan suburb of Grandville until he was 10 and his family moved to Medina, Ohio. Teske was 6 ft 9 in (2.06 m) as a high school freshman and 6 ft 11 in (2.11 m) as a sophomore before eclipsing 7 ft 0 in (2.13 m) as a junior for Medina High School. Among Teske's advisors on his recruitment was his maternal grandfather, Jim Zuidema. On August 7, 2014, he committed to Michigan via Twitter. Teske signed his National Letters of Intent on November 11, 2015, on the same day as future teammates Austin Davis, Ibi Watson and Zavier Simpson. Simpson, Watson and Teske were all named to the 2015–16 Associated Press Ohio high school Division I boys basketball all-state 1st team.

College recruiting
Name	Hometown	School	Height	Weight	Commit date
Jon Teske; C	Medina, OH	Medina Senior High School (OH)	6 ft 10 in (2.08 m)	220 lb (100 kg)	Jul 8, 2014
Jon Teske; C	Recruit ratings: Scout: Rivals: 247Sports: ESPN:				
Overall recruit ranking: Rivals: 108 247Sports: 142
Note: In many cases, Scout, Rivals, 247Sports, On3, and ESPN may conflict in their listings of height and weight.; In these cases, the average was taken. ESPN grades are on a 100-point scale.; Sources: "Michigan 2016 Basketball Commitments". Rivals.; "2016 Michigan Basketball Commits". Scout.; "ESPN Recruiting Nation Basketball". ESPN.; "Scout.com Team Recruiting Rankings". Scout.; "2016 Team Ranking". Rivals.

== College career ==
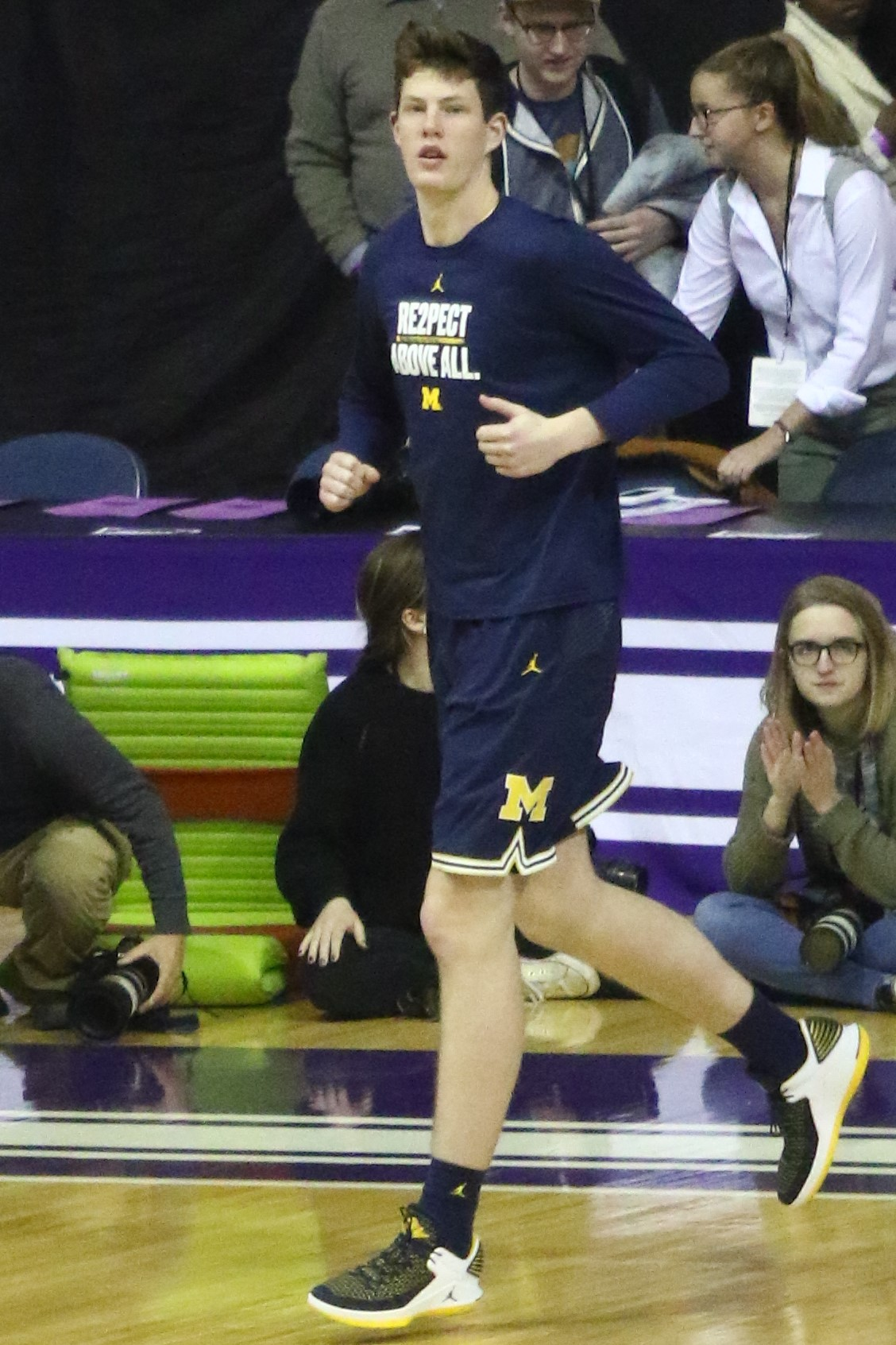
Teske for the 2017–18 Michigan Wolverines

=== Freshman season ===
Teske logged just 61 minutes in 20 games for the 2016–17 Michigan Wolverines men's basketball team. The team won the 2017 Big Ten Conference men's basketball tournament. In the 2017 NCAA tournament, Michigan reached the round of 16 but lost to Oregon. Following the season, D. J. Wilson declared early for the 2017 NBA draft and Mark Donnal left the program, making way for Teske and Austin Davis to compete for more playing time.

=== Sophomore season ===
On November 16, 2017, Teske, who had previous career highs of four points and three rebounds, led the 2017–18 Wolverines with a 10-point, 11-rebound double-double in a victory against Southern Miss. On December 16, Michigan defeated Detroit 90–58 as Teske made his first collegiate start (in place of Mo Wagner) and recorded his second career double-double (15 points and 10 rebounds); the game marked the first collegiate basketball game at Little Caesars Arena.

Michigan claimed their second consecutive Big Ten tournament championship at the 2018 Big Ten Conference men's basketball tournament, becoming the first team to win consecutive tournament championships since Ohio State in 2010 and 2011; in the championship game against (#8 AP Poll/#8 Coaches Poll) Purdue, Teske posted 14 points off the bench while matched up against Isaac Haas, when Wagner had foul trouble. In the 2018 NCAA tournament, Teske played 17 minutes in a buzzer beater 64–63 victory over (#21 AP Poll/#19 Coaches Poll) Houston, including a two free throws as part of a rare five-point play to tie the score at 51 with 5:41 remaining. Michigan reached the National Championship Game where it lost to (#2 Coaches Poll/#2 AP Poll) Villanova. Teske was one of a few players from the Cleveland area (including former Wolverine Eric Riley) to have played in a championship game. For the season, Teske averaged 12.3 minutes per game to go with 3.4 points and 3.3 rebounds. Since the team reached the championship games of both the Big Ten tournament and the NCAA tournament, Teske shares the Michigan (and NCAA) single-season games played record (41) with teammates Duncan Robinson, Muhammad-Ali Abdur-Rahkman, Simpson and Charles Matthews. Members of the 2010–11 Connecticut Huskies also played 41 games (an NCAA record).

=== Junior season ===
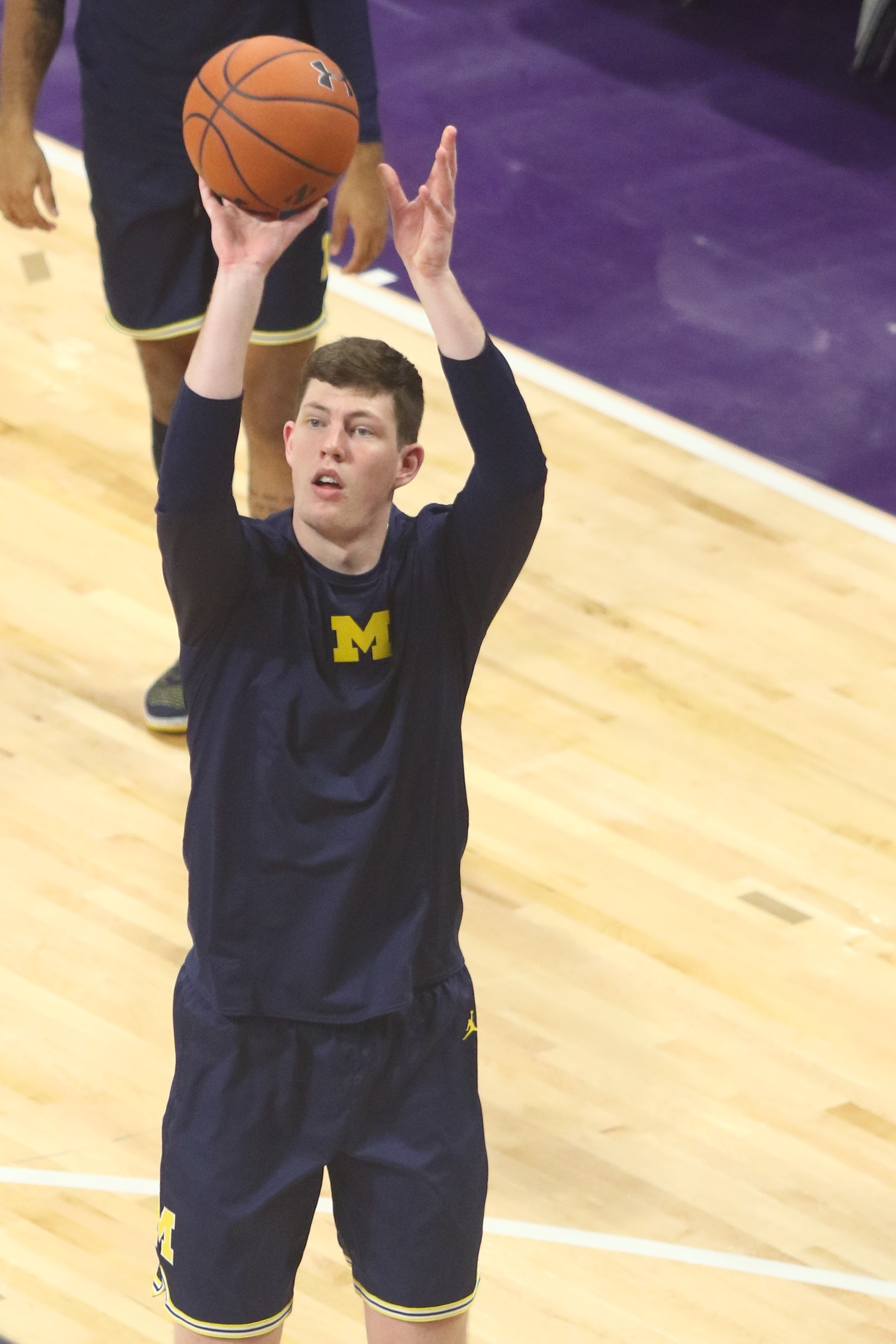
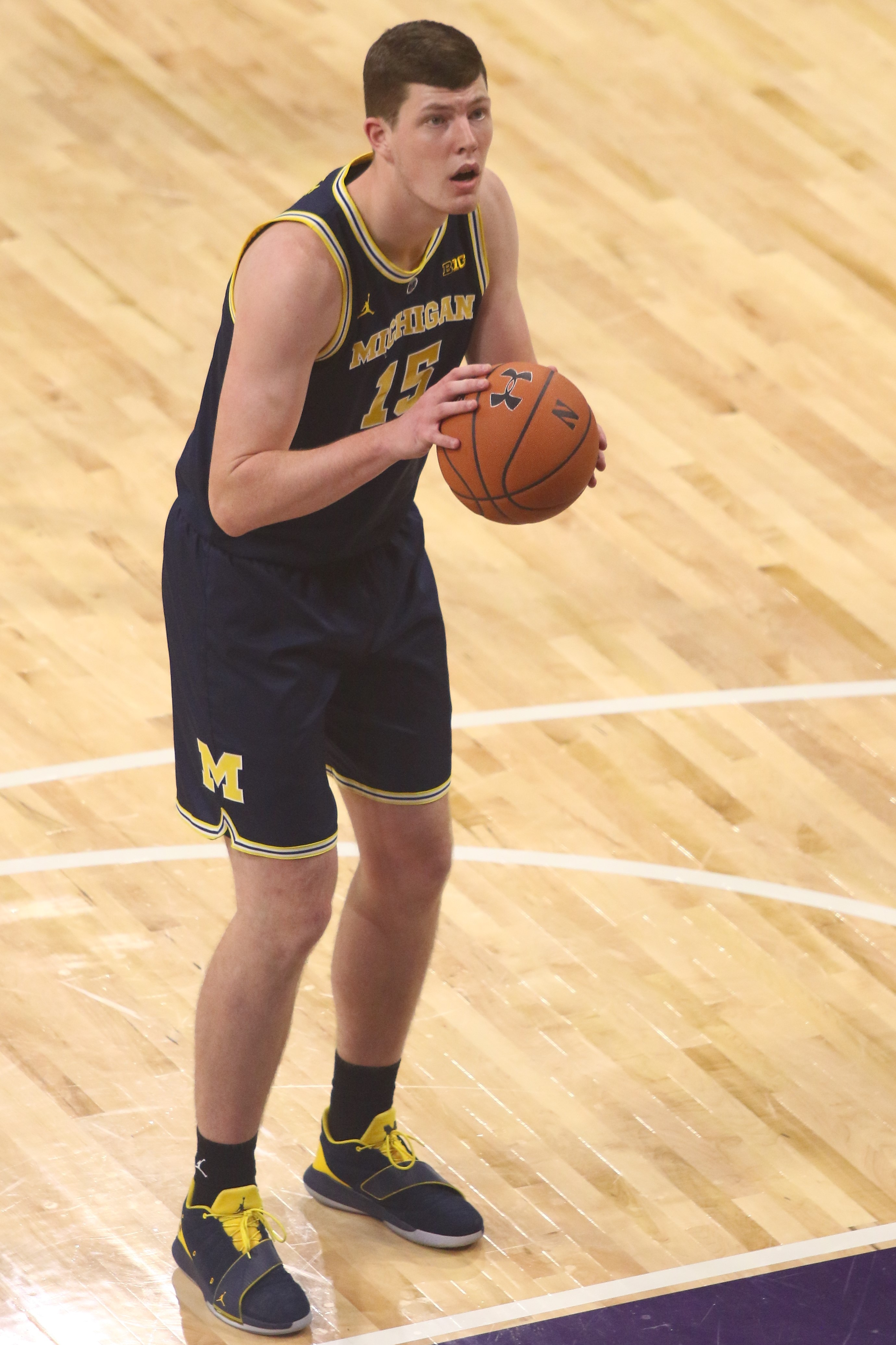
Teske for the 2018–19 Michigan Wolverines

In November 2018, Teske twice posted 5 blocked shots in a game: On November 10 against Holy Cross and November 28 against (#11/#13) North Carolina 84–67 in the ACC–Big Ten Challenge. Teske first posted 17 points and made a three-point shot on November 18 in a win against Providence in the Hall of Fame Tip Off tournament championship game. Teske again posted 17 points on December 1, against (#19/#18) Purdue in Michigan's Big Ten Conference season opener. On December 4, Michigan defeated Northwestern 62–60. When Teske experienced his first foul trouble of the season Michigan saw a comfortable win turn into a nailbiter as Northwestern posted a 13–2 run after Teske joined teammate Matthews on the sidelines with three fouls. On January 10, 2019, Michigan defeated Illinois as Teske added 13 points and 11 rebounds, for his third career double-double, and first of the season. With the win, the Wolverines improved to 16–0 on the season, matching the 2012–13 and 1985–86 teams for the school's best start to a season. On January 13, Michigan defeated Northwestern to establish a school record for best start at 17–0 and tied the 1984–85 team's school record 17-game win streak on the strength of a career-high-tying 17 points by Teske, who posted his second consecutive double-double (11 rebounds). Teske tied his career high of 17 points again in wins against (#19/#19) Wisconsin on February 9 (in a double-double with 12 rebounds) and on February 21 against Minnesota when he again posted five blocks. On February 24, Teske posted 10 points and 11 rebounds, for his fourth double-double of the season in a loss to (#10/#11) Michigan State. On February 28, Teske posted a then career-high 22 points and 10 assists, for his second consecutive double-double and fifth of the season, in a win against Nebraska. On March 3, Teske posted 11 points and 10 rebounds, for his third consecutive game with a double-double and sixth of the season in a win against (#17/#20) Maryland. Following the season, he was a 2019 All-Big Ten honorable mention selection (coaches and media). Teske's 75 blocked shots in 37 games (2.03/game), finished second in the Big Ten to Purdue's Matt Haarms who had 79 blocks in 36 games (2.06/game).

=== Senior season ===
Prior to the season, Teske was named to the preseason Abdul-Jabbar Award 20-man watchlist. The team began the season unranked but received votes in the national polls. On November 5, 2019, in a game against Appalachian State, Teske posted 17 points and a career-high 13 rebounds, for his 11th career double-double. During the November 27–29, 2019 Battle 4 Atlantis, Michigan defeated Iowa State, (#6 AP Poll/#4 Coaches Poll) North Carolina, and (#8/#7) Gonzaga to win the tournament. In the championship game, Teske added 19 points, a career-high 15 rebounds and four blocks and was named tournament MVP. Teske's three double-digit-scoring games and 10-block/29-rebound tournament earned him co-Big Ten Player of the Week. His performance helped Michigan tie the 1989–90 Kansas Jayhawks for the largest jump in the history of the AP Poll as they jumped from unranked to number 4 in the 2019–20 basketball rankings. On December 5, Teske was one of six Big Ten athletes named to the Oscar Robertson Trophy Watch List. On December 29, Teske posted a career-high 25 points in a win against UMass Lowell.

== Professional career ==
After going undrafted in the 2020 NBA draft, Teske signed with the Orlando Magic for training camp. He was waived at the conclusion of training camp, and added to the roster of the Lakeland Magic for the NBA G League restart, averaging 6.7 points, 3.4 rebounds and 1.4 assists while helping Lakeland win the G League title.

On March 25, 2021, Teske signed with Filou Oostende of the Belgian League, but left the team for personal reasons before playing a single game. On September 8, he signed with the Orlando Magic, but was later waived on October 7 after two preseason games. Teske subsequently rejoined the Lakeland Magic.

On January 3, 2022, Teske signed a 10-day contract with the Memphis Grizzlies.

Following the expiration of his 10-day contract, Teske returned to the Lakeland Magic.

Teske retired from professional basketball shortly after the 2021–22 season.

== Personal life ==
Teske is from a family of tall athletes. His father, Ben, is 6 ft 8 in (2.03 m) and his mother, Julie, is 6 ft 1 in (1.85 m). His older sister, Hannah, and younger sister, Abby, are both at least 6 ft 0 in (1.83 m). Both his parents played basketball for Grace College and his sisters played high school sports. His maternal grandparents remained in the Grand Rapids area after the family moved to Medina and Teske continued to visit Grand Rapids often while in college.

Teske currently works in sales for Gordon Food Service.

== Career statistics ==
Legend
GP	Games played	GS	Games started	MPG	Minutes per game
FG%	Field goal percentage	3P%	3-point field goal percentage	FT%	Free throw percentage
RPG	Rebounds per game	APG	Assists per game	SPG	Steals per game
BPG	Blocks per game	PPG	Points per game	**Bold**	Career high

=== NBA ===
Year	Team	GP	GS	MPG	FG%	3P%	FT%	RPG	APG	SPG	BPG	PPG
2021–22	Memphis	3	0	2.7	.000	—	.000	.7	.3	.3	.0	.0
Career		3	0	2.7	.000	—	.000	.7	.3	.3	.0	.0

*	Led NCAA Division I

=== College ===
Year	Team	GP	GS	MPG	FG%	3P%	FT%	RPG	APG	SPG	BPG	PPG
2016–17	Michigan	20	0	3.0	.143	.000	.500	.6	.1	.2	.4	.3
2017–18	Michigan	**41***	2	12.3	**.541**	.000	.574	3.3	.4	.6	.6	3.4
2018–19	Michigan	37	**37**	**27.9**	.521	**.299**	.593	**7.0**	.9	.7	**2.0**	9.5
2019–20	Michigan	31	31	**27.9**	.478	.246	**.714**	6.7	**1.1**	**1.0**	1.8	**11.6**
Career		129	70	19.1	.501	.271	.631	4.8	.7	.6	1.3	6.6
