= Colin Castleton =

American / Panamanian basketball player (born 2000)

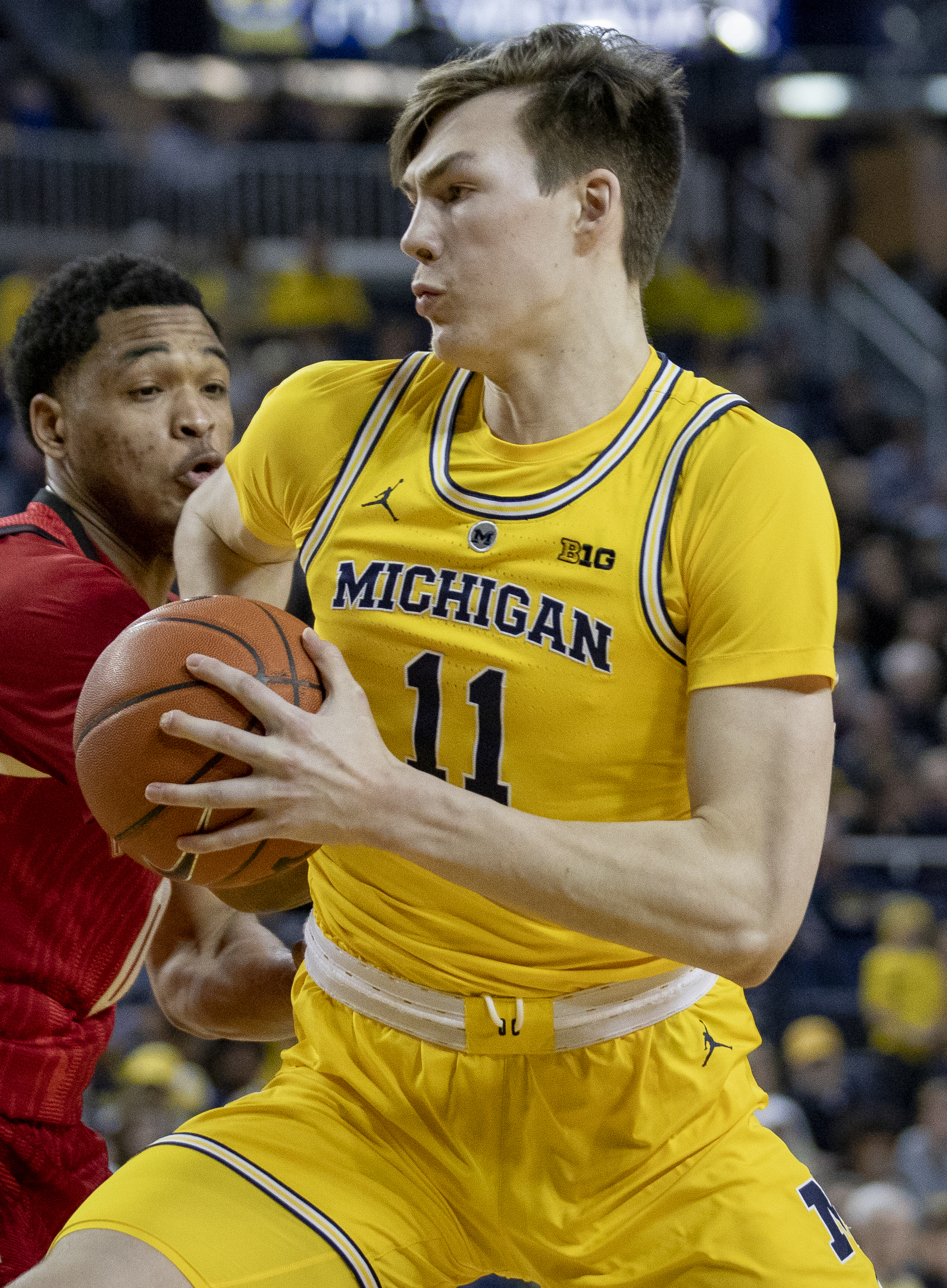
- Castleton with Michigan in 2019

No. 14 – Orlando Magic
- Position: Center
- League: NBA

Personal information
- Born: May 25, 2000 (age 26) Pembroke Pines, Florida, U.S.
- Listed height: 6 ft 11 in (2.11 m)
- Listed weight: 250 lb (113 kg)

Career information
- High school: Father Lopez Catholic (Daytona Beach, Florida)
- College: Michigan (2018–2020); Florida (2020–2023)
- NBA draft: 2023: undrafted
- Playing career: 2023–present

Career history
- 2023–2024: Los Angeles Lakers
- 2023–2024: →South Bay Lakers
- 2024–2025: Memphis Grizzlies
- 2024–2025: →Memphis Hustle
- 2025: Osceola Magic
- 2025: Toronto Raptors
- 2025: →Raptors 905
- 2025: Philadelphia 76ers
- 2025: Toronto Raptors
- 2025–present: Orlando Magic
- 2025–present: →Osceola Magic

Career highlights
- NBA Cup champion (2023); First-team All-SEC (2023); 2× Second-team All-SEC (2021, 2022)
- Stats at NBA.com
- Stats at Basketball Reference

Colin Reed Castleton (born May 25, 2000) is an American professional basketball player for the Orlando Magic of the National Basketball Association (NBA), on a two-way contract with the Osceola Magic of the NBA G League. He played college basketball for the Michigan Wolverines and the Florida Gators, where he was a three-time All-Southeastern Conference (SEC) honoree.

== Early life ==
Castleton was born and lived in Pembroke Pines, Florida. He also lived in Tampa, Florida, Fort Benning Georgia, Doral, Florida and DeLand, Florida. Castleton attended Father Lopez Catholic High School in Daytona Beach, Florida. He is of Panamanian descent through his paternal and maternal great-grand parents, grand parents and parents. His father, Eddie Castleton, played for the Panamanian National Baseball Team in 1986. As a senior, he averaged 24.5 points, 11.7 rebounds, and 5.6 blocks per game and was named a finalist for Florida's Mr. Basketball Award and the Class 7A Player of the Year. Castleton was rated as a four-star recruit and committed to playing college basketball for Michigan after considering 32 offers including Duke, Clemson, Georgia, Purdue, Florida, Florida State, and Xavier. On November 10, 2017, Castleton tendered his National Letter of Intent as part of a five-man recruiting class for the University of Michigan that included Ignas Brazdeikis, David DeJulius, Brandon Johns, and Adrien Nunez.

== College career ==
Castleton played in 19 games as a true freshman and averaged 1.1 points and 1.1 rebounds per game. As a sophomore, he averaged 3.1 points on 54% shooting and 2.4 rebounds over 25 games played, all off the bench. Following the end of the season, Castleton entered the transfer portal and ultimately transferred to the University of Florida, which had offered him a scholarship coming out of high school.

Castleton was granted a waiver to make him eligible to play for the Florida Gators immediately rather than have to sit out one season per NCAA transfer rules. During the season, he became the seventh Gator (following Vernon Maxwell, Dan Cross, Joakim Noah, Scottie Wilbekin, Michael Frazier II (3) and Jalen Hudson) to ever earn Southeastern Conference (SEC) player of the week honors at least twice in the same season. He was named second-team All-SEC after averaging 12.4 points and 6.4 rebounds with a conference-high 2.3 blocks per game during the regular season. Following the season, Castleton declared for the 2021 NBA draft while maintaining his college eligibility. He ultimately opted to withdraw from the draft and return to Florida.

On November 14, 2021, Castleton recorded 15 points, a career-high 16 rebounds, and six blocks in a 71–55 win against Florida State. That effort contributed to his third SEC Player of the Week honor. He was named to the Second Team All-SEC as a senior.

On January 16, 2023, Castleton was recognized with his fourth career SEC Player of the Week award, making him the second Gator to achieve four, one behind Vernon Maxwell in Gator history. The effort partly recognizes the rare stat line of 16 points, 13 rebounds, six assists, three steals, and two blocked shots against Missouri on January 14. On February 15, 2023, Castleton broke his hand in a 79–64 win against Ole Miss and was lost for the season. Before the injury, he was averaging 16.5 points (third in the SEC), 7.9 rebounds (sixth) and 3.0 blocks (first) per game. He had been on a hot streak prior to the injury, with averages of 24.8 points and 9.5 rebounds per game over his last four games. The coaches recognized him as a first-team All-SEC selectee.

== Professional career ==
=== Los Angeles / South Bay Lakers (2023–2024) ===
On July 3, 2023, Castleton signed a two-way contract with the NBA's Los Angeles Lakers and the G-League's South Bay Lakers. Castleton was honored as a part of the Lakers team that won the inaugural 2023 NBA In-Season Tournament game.

In March, Castleton suffered a right wrist fracture, leaving him out of the lineup for multiple weeks.

On July 6, 2024, Castleton signed another two-way contract with the Lakers, but was waived on October 19.

=== Memphis Grizzlies / Hustle (2024) ===
On October 27, 2024, Castleton joined the Long Island Nets and three days later, he signed a two-way contract with the Memphis Grizzlies. However, on January 10, 2025, he was waived by the Grizzlies.

=== Osceola Magic (2025) ===
On January 15, 2025, Castleton joined the Osceola Magic after acquiring his rights from the Long Island Nets.

=== Toronto Raptors (2025) ===
On March 6, 2025, Castleton was signed to a 10-Day contract by the Toronto Raptors of the National Basketball Association. On that same day, Castleton was assigned to the Raptors 905 of the NBA G League. In his first NBA start on March 12, Castleton posted a career high 14 rebounds against the Philadelphia 76ers. On March 14, Castleton achieved a career-high 13 points with a perfect shooting night (5-5 FG, 1-1 3Pt, 2-2 FT) against the Utah Jazz. Castleton re-signed with the Raptors on March 16. His contract expired on March 26, making him a free agent.

=== Philadelphia 76ers (2025) ===
On April 2, 2025, it was reported that the Philadelphia 76ers planned to sign Castleton to a 10-day contract, which became official the following day. He made his Sixers debut the same evening against the Milwaukee Bucks. On April 9, he matched his career best 14-rebound total against the Washington Wizards and posted a career high 16 points on April 11 against the Atlanta Hawks.

=== Second stint with Raptors (2025) ===
On April 12, 2025, Castleton signed a two-year standard contract with the Toronto Raptors. In 11 total appearances (four starts) for Toronto, he averaged 7.2 points, 6.9 rebounds, and 1.6 assists.

=== Orlando / Osceola Magic (2025–present) ===
On August 22, 2025, Castleton signed an Exhibit 10 contract with the Orlando Magic. On October 17, the Magic converted Castleton's contract into a two-way contract. On November 29, Castleton was sidelined with a thumb fracture. In four total appearances for Orlando, he averaged 1.3 points and 2.0 rebounds.

On July 1, 2026, Castleton re–signed with the Magic on a two–way contract.

== Career statistics ==
Legend
GP	Games played	GS	Games started	MPG	Minutes per game
FG%	Field goal percentage	3P%	3-point field goal percentage	FT%	Free throw percentage
RPG	Rebounds per game	APG	Assists per game	SPG	Steals per game
BPG	Blocks per game	PPG	Points per game	**Bold**	Career high

=== NBA ===
Year	Team	GP	GS	MPG	FG%	3P%	FT%	RPG	APG	SPG	BPG	PPG
2023–24	L.A. Lakers	**16**	0	3.7	**.563**	—	**1.000**	.8	.2	.1	.0	1.5
2024–25	Memphis	10	0	4.6	.200	.000	.909	.9	.0	.1	.1	1.4
2024–25	Toronto	11	**4**	**26.2**	.500	**.250**	.722	6.9	1.6	**.5**	**.7**	**7.2**
2024–25	Philadelphia	5	0	19.6	.500	.000	.667	**7.4**	**2.0**	.2	.2	6.0
2025–26	Orlando	4	0	5.3	.400	—	**1.000**	2.0	.3	.3	.0	1.3
Career		46	4	11.1	.479	.125	.800	3.1	.7	.2	.2	3.3

=== College ===
Year	Team	GP	GS	MPG	FG%	3P%	FT%	RPG	APG	SPG	BPG	PPG
2018–19	Michigan	19	0	3.5	.409	.000	.333	1.1	.1	.1	.2	1.1
2019–20	Michigan	25	0	7.9	.540	.000	**.828**	2.4	.3	.1	.5	3.1
2020–21	Florida	24	21	25.7	**.597**	.000	.781	6.4	1.1	.5	2.3	12.4
2021–22	Florida	**28**	**28**	30.7	.546	.000	.703	**9.0**	1.5	**.9**	2.2	**16.2**
2022–23	Florida	26	26	**31.2**	.500	**.133**	.729	7.7	**2.7**	**.9**	**3.0**	16.0
Career		122	76	20.9	.537	.063	.730	5.6	1.2	.5	1.7	10.4
