= Father Lopez Catholic High School =

Location
- 3918 LPGA Boulevard; Daytona Beach, (Volusia County), Florida 32124; United States
- Coordinates: 29°10′25″N 81°7′11″W

Information
- Type: Private, Coeducational
- Religious affiliation: Catholic
- Established: 1959
- Dean: Melissa Knepshield
- Principal: Marie Gallo-Lethcoe
- Grades: 9–12
- Colors: Green and White
- Mascot: Green Wave
- Team name: Green Wave
- Accreditation: Southern Association of Colleges and Schools
- Website: www.fatherlopez.org

Father Lopez Catholic High School is a private, Roman Catholic high school in Daytona Beach, Florida. It is located in the Roman Catholic Diocese of Orlando. 413 students are enrolled.

== History ==
The first campus was funded by the president of Daytona Beverages since the man wanted a Catholic school for his family instead of having to move back to St. Louis, Missouri. Father Lopez Catholic High School was established in 1959 to meet the growing need for a central Catholic high school in the Daytona area. The school replaced several parish schools, including St. Paul Parish School, which was established in 1924 as the first Catholic high school in the area. It was built by the Diocese of St. Augustine at 960 Madison Avenue. The school was accredited by the Southern Association of Colleges and Schools.

In 1968 the school was transferred to the administration of the Diocese of Orlando.

In 2001 the school paid $1.17 million for 2 acres (0.81 ha) of land and two buildings as the first step in a planned $3 million expansion and renovation project.

In 2004 Bishop Thomas Wenski signed a $2 million-plus agreement for the Orlando Diocese to buy 80 acres (32 ha) on LPGA Boulevard for a replacement campus. The Diocese sold the approximately 15 acres (6.1 ha) old campus to help pay for the new school.

In 2005 Wenski supplied $1.5 million of diocesan funds for the new school. The school raised $10 million.

In 2007 construction on the current campus began. Construction completed in 2008; the facility is about 3 miles (4.8 km) from its previous location. The campus has a main football field with a new track, a new baseball field, a new softball field, new tennis courts and practice fields.

In 2012, Michael J. Coury became the school's president.

== Student body ==
The enrollment for 2012–2013 is about 413 students. Senior class is about 95 students. Nine Advanced Placement (AP) courses are offered. 68.4% passed AP courses in 2010; Florida average was 42.9%. Class of 2009 mean SAT score was 1549; average Florida score was 1475. ACT composite mean score was 21.9; Florida mean score was 19.5. 64% of the class of 2009 enrolled in the Bright Futures Scholarship Program.

== Campus ==
The campus, new in 2008, cost $30 million. The 100-seat chapel was constructed in the Spanish style. The stadium seats 1200.

There is a double gym that holds 740 people. There are over 24 computers for public use, 24 computers for classes, and a television production room with a screen and news casting equipment. The cafeteria-auditorium holds 740 with a "murphy bed" fold up stage. The area also doubles as a dance studio. An "in-house" chef caters continuous events.

== Athletics ==
The school fields 32 teams playing 13 sports.

=== Recognition ===
The girls' varsity basketball team were State champs in 2005 and 2013. The boys' varsity cross country team were State champs in 2015.

Ryan Waddell was the 1A 238 lb state weightlifting champion in 2019.

== Notable alumni ==
- Colin Castleton – professional basketball player
- Daniel Dye – ARCA Menards Series driver
- Larry Hogan – Governor of Maryland
- Brian Kaplan – professional baseball coach
- Hunter Wendelstedt – Major League Baseball umpire

== Recognition ==
The National Catholic Educational Association recognized the school board as "outstanding" in 2008, the only board to be so recognized.
