= Charles Matthews (basketball) =

American basketball player (born 1996)

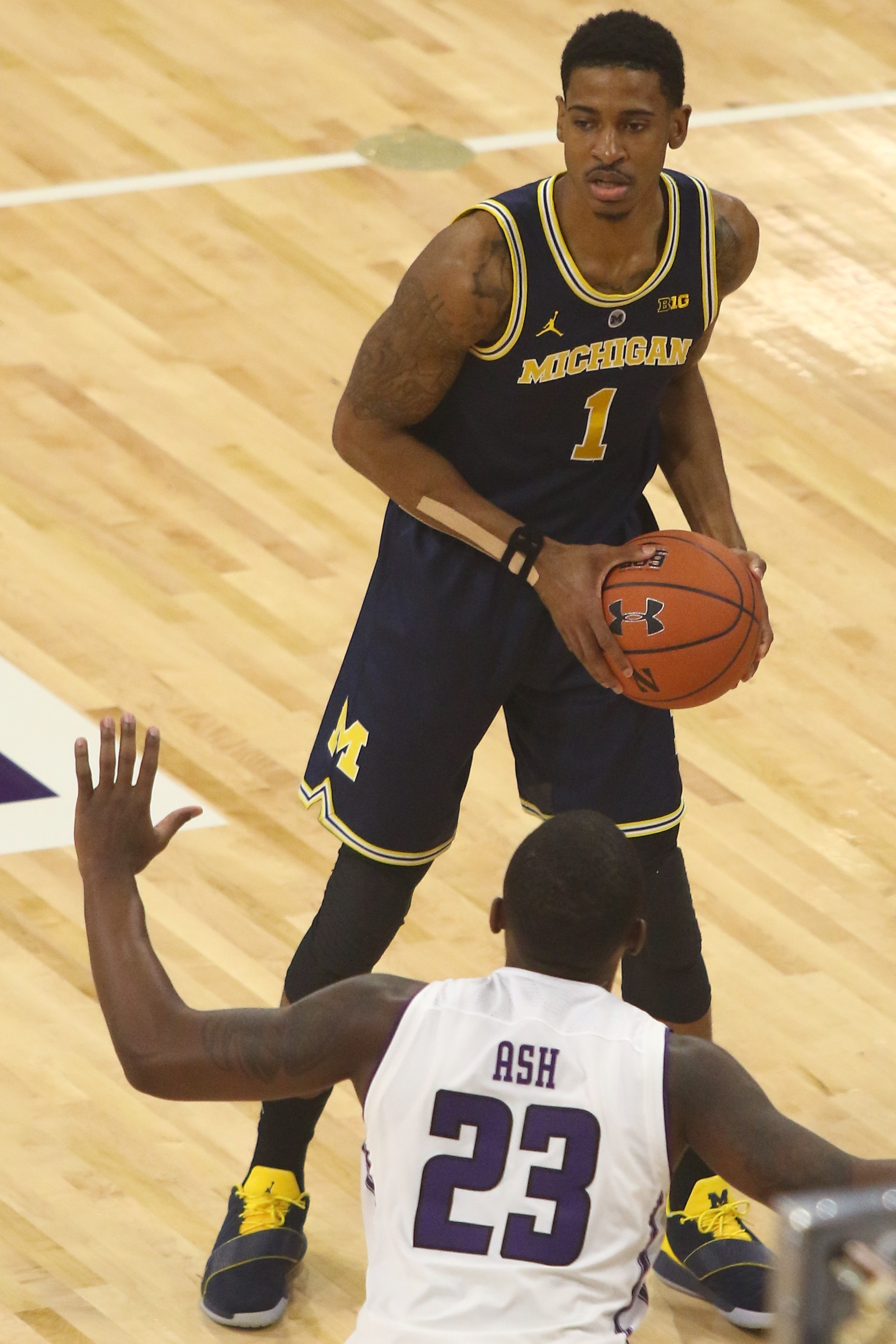
- Matthews with Michigan in 2018

Free agent
- Position: Shooting guard

Personal information
- Born: November 15, 1996 (age 30) Chicago, Illinois, U.S.
- Listed height: 6 ft 6 in (1.98 m)
- Listed weight: 205 lb (93 kg)

Career information
- High school: St. Rita of Cascia (Chicago, Illinois)
- College: Kentucky (2015–2016); Michigan (2017–2019)
- NBA draft: 2019: undrafted
- Playing career: 2021–present

Career history
- 2021–2022: Cleveland Charge
- 2022: Memphis Hustle
- 2022: Maine Celtics
- 2022–2023: Windy City Bulls
- 2024: Luleå
- 2025: Memphis Hustle
- 2025–2026: Bendigo Braves
- 2026: Al-Wehdat

Career highlights
- USA Basketball 3×3 Tournament MVP (2014)
- Stats at NBA.com
- Stats at Basketball Reference

Charles I. Matthews (born November 15, 1996) is an American professional basketball player. He played college basketball for the Michigan Wolverines. He played his freshman season for the 2015–16 Kentucky Wildcats men's basketball team after attending St. Rita of Cascia High School. As a high school senior he was a 2015 Jordan Brand Classic All-American selection.

He earned West Region Most Outstanding Player in the 2018 NCAA basketball tournament for the 2017–18 team that won the 2018 Big Ten Conference men's basketball tournament and reached the 2018 NCAA championship game. After playing his redshirt junior season for the 2018–19 Wolverines, he declared for the 2019 NBA draft.

== Early life ==
Matthews was raised in the Avalon Park Community area of Chicago, near 79th Street and Cottage Grove Avenue, which is on the borderline between the Chatham and Greater Grand Crossing Community areas on the South Side. Matthews briefly lived in Matteson, Illinois before returning to the South Side where he attended Ray Elementary and began his basketball career at the 63rd and Stony Island YMCA. In his youth, he played chess, hockey, the trombone and skateboarded, but he began to take basketball seriously the summer before his high school freshman year. Matthews committed to playing basketball for John Calipari and the Kentucky Wildcats on February 26, 2014, during his junior year. At the time, he was rated as the number 11 player and number 3 shooting guard in the national class of 2015 by Rivals.com and number 12 player by ESPN. Among his other offers at the time were Illinois, Kansas, Marquette and Michigan State. Matthews was the first to commit to playing basketball for Kentucky's 2015 class. On June 1, Matthews won the 2014 USA Basketball 3-on-3 Under-18 National Championship Tournament with teammates Braxton Blackwell, Tim Delaney and Kipper Nichols. Matthews earned the tournament's Most Valuable Player (MVP) award.

Matthews officially signed his National Letter of Intent on National Signing Day, November 22, 2014. During Matthews' four-year high school career at St. Rita's, he led the team to 82 wins and four straight Chicago Catholic League South championships, including a 26–4 record as a senior. As a junior, he averaged 17.0 points and 5.0 rebounds for the 21–8 St. Rita's team that was eliminated from the 2014 IHSA Class 4A playoffs by the Jahlil Okafor-led Whitney M. Young Magnet High School. As a senior, Matthews averaged 21.3 points and 6.2 rebounds and a 47 field goal percentage. After his senior season, he was a selection for the Associated Press' Class-4A All-State first team. Matthews' national ranking fell significantly from the time he committed to Kentucky to the end of his high school career. Although his final rankings were 42nd by ESPN and 48th by Rivals.com, he graduated as the 59th-ranked player according to 247Sports.com's composite ranking. Nonetheless, Matthews was selected to play in the 2015 Jordan Brand Classic. At Kentucky, he joined fellow Chicagoan and former AAU teammate Tyler Ulis in the Kentucky backcourt.

== College career ==
=== Kentucky ===
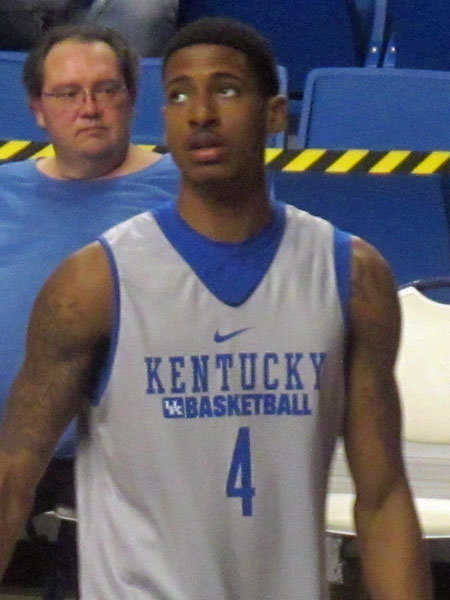
Matthews with the 2015–16 Wildcats

Matthews played in 36 games (including 3 starts) for the 2015–16 Kentucky Wildcats, posting averages of 1.7 points, 1.6 rebounds and 10.3 minutes. Matthews' three starts included the season opener against Albany and the December 26 rivalry game against #16 ranked Louisville, when Isaiah Briscoe injured his ankle in pregame warmups and sat out. His season highs were 11 points against South Florida (November 27), 7 rebounds against Boston University (November 24) and 34 minutes against Illinois State (November 30).

=== Michigan ===
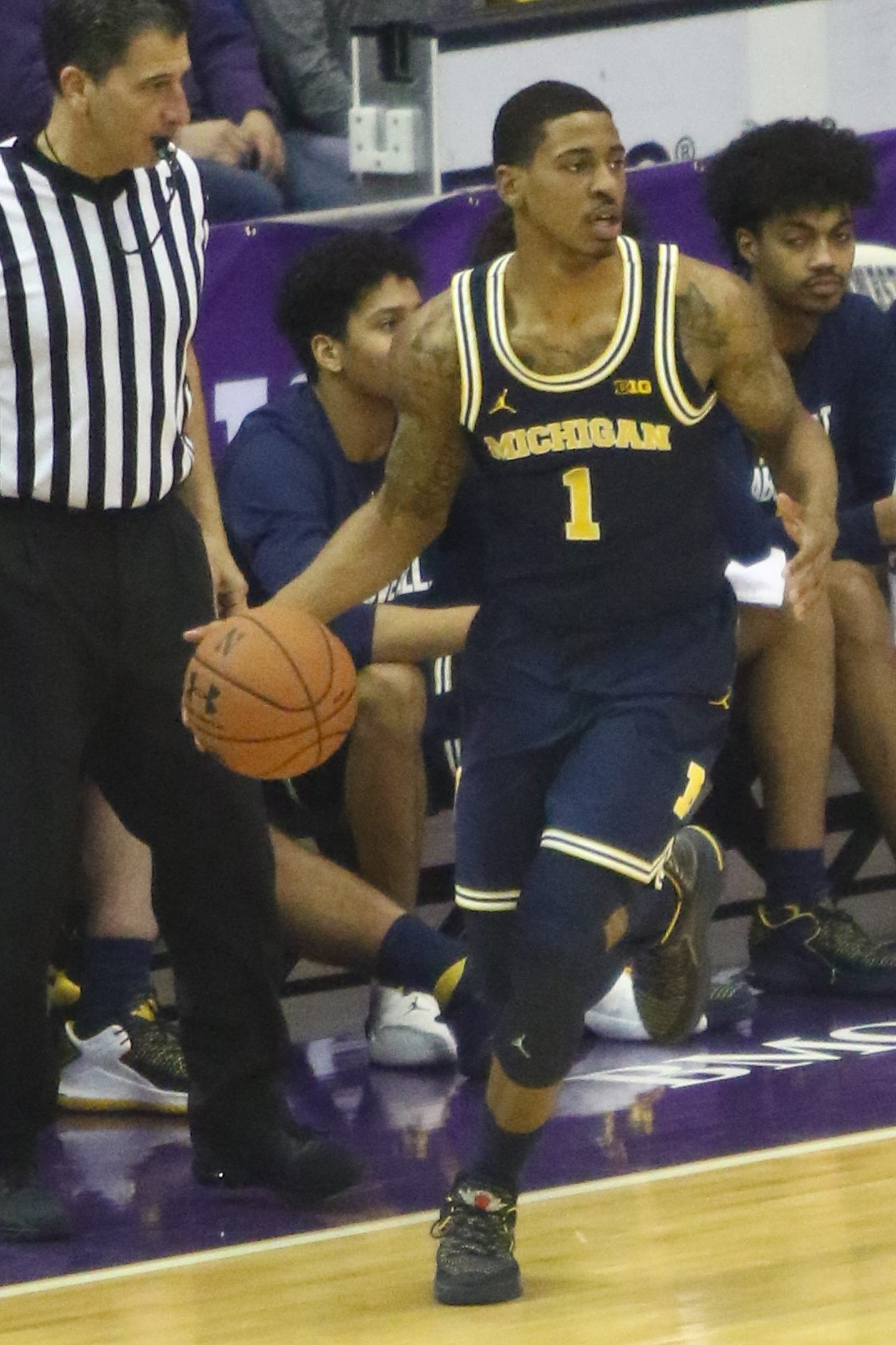
Matthews with the 2017–18 Wolverines

Following the season he had a medical procedure on his hip. Matthews was granted his release from the team on May 18, 2016. On June 20, 2016, reports confirmed that Matthews, who would have to sit out the 2016–17 season, had visited both Xavier and Michigan and selected Michigan. Michigan confirmed the story on July 1. He served on the scout team for the 2016–17 Michigan Wolverines.

==== Sophomore Year ====
As a redshirt sophomore, Matthews scored 20 points against North Florida in his first game at Michigan on November 11, 2017. In the game, he and Duncan Robinson became the first Michigan teammates to score 20 points in a game since March 3, 2015. Matthews posted career-highs of 28 points and eight rebounds in the first-round game of the 2017 Maui Invitational Tournament against LSU on November 20 but only made one of two free throws with Michigan trailing by two points with 9 seconds remaining. The following night, he posted his first career double-double with 22 points (on 8-of-8 field goal shooting) and 10 rebounds. On November 26, Matthews posted a points-assists double-double with 17 points and a career-high 12 assists against UC Riverside. Since Moe Wagner added 21 points and 10 rebounds, the team had its first pair of double-doubles in a game since Glenn Robinson III and Trey Burke did so for the 2012–13 national runner-up Wolverines on January 6, 2013. On December 21, Michigan defeated the previously winless Alabama A&M Bulldogs 97–47 as Matthews posted 31 points, another career high. Matthews tallied 20 or more points six different times before the final four, but none in 2017–18 Big Ten Conference play, where he never scored more than 16 points.

Matthews averaged 10 points and 5.5 rebounds during Michigan's four games in the 2018 Big Ten Conference men's basketball tournament, helping the team win its second consecutive Big Ten tournament championship. On March 15, Michigan began play in the 2018 NCAA tournament with a 61–47 victory over Montana in the first round, as Matthews posted 20 points and a career-tying 11 rebounds, for his fourth double-double of the season. On March 21, Matthews became an Academic All-Big Ten honoree. On March 24, Michigan defeated Florida State 58–54 in the West regional finals. Michigan, who established a single-season school-record 32 wins with the win, was led by Matthews with 17 points. Matthews, who averaged 16.5 points and 7.3 rebounds to lead Michigan in the first four games of the NCAA tournament, was named West Region Most Outstanding player. On March 31 in the national semifinals, Matthews contributed 17 as Michigan defeated Loyola–Chicago 69–57. The team lost in the 2018 NCAA Division I men's basketball championship game to (#2 Coaches Poll/#2 AP Poll) Villanova. For the tournament he averaged 14.8 points, 6.2 rebounds, 1.2 assists, and 1.2 steals. For the season, he averaged 13.0 points and 5.5 rebounds. Since the team reached the championship games of both the Big Ten tournament and the NCAA tournament, Matthews shares the Michigan (and NCAA) single-season games played record (41) with teammates Robinson, Muhammad-Ali Abdur-Rahkman, Jon Teske and Zavier Simpson. Members of the 2010–11 Connecticut Huskies also played 41 games (an NCAA record).

Following the season he declared for the 2018 NBA draft without hiring an agent. He didn't receive an invitation to the NBA Draft Combine. Nonetheless, he had workouts with multiple NBA teams. In the 2017 draft class, 84 of the 137 underclassmen that declared were not invited to the NBA draft combine and only 4 remained in the draft. None of the four was drafted in the 2017 NBA draft. Matthews withdrew from the 2018 NBA draft.

==== Junior year ====
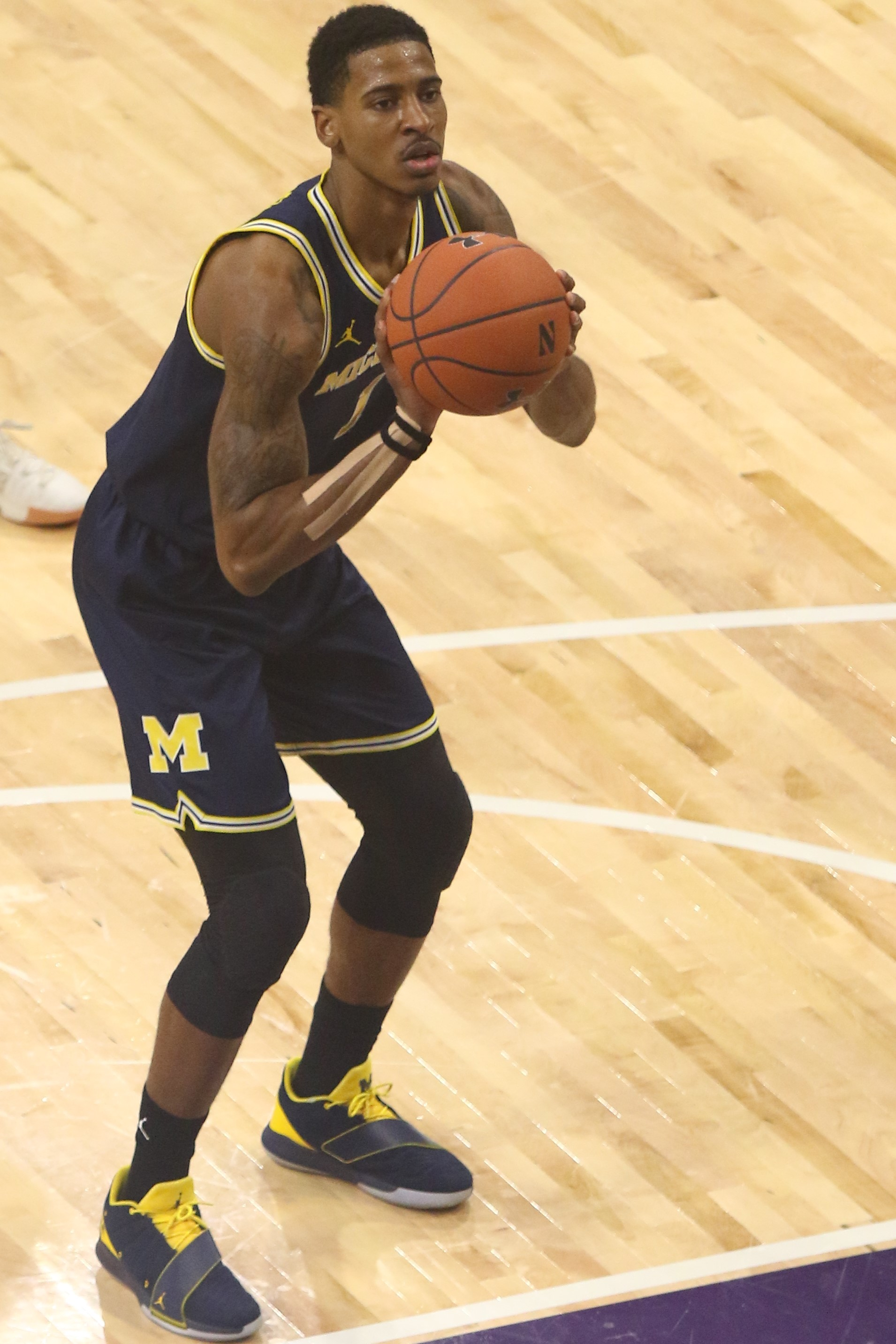
Matthews for the 2018–19 Wolverines

Matthews was a preseason All-Big Ten selection by the Big Ten Media. Prior to the season he was one of nine Big Ten players named to the preseason John R. Wooden Award watchlist and one of eight named to the preseason Naismith College Player of the Year watchlist. On December 15, Michigan defeated Western Michigan 70–62 with 25 points and 10 rebounds from Matthews, for his fifth career double-double and first of the season. On January 13, Michigan defeated Northwestern to establish a school record for best start at 17–0 and tied the school's record 17-game win streak. On January 22, Michigan defeated Minnesota 59–57 after a buzzer beater by Matthews. On January 25, Matthews posted 10 points and a career-tying 11 rebounds for his sixth career double-double in a 69–46 victory over Indiana. The 23-point victory marked the largest ever by Michigan on the road against Indiana. On February 6, Matthews was the only Big Ten Athlete named a Julius Erving Award Top 10 finalist. On February 9, Michigan defeated (#19/#19) Wisconsin 61–52. Michigan was led by Matthews with a game-high 18 points. The teams each scored 27 in the first half and 16 of Matthews 18 came in the second half, including 14 of Michigan's 19 points in a decisive stretch taking the score from 38–35 to 57–50 with 23.8 seconds remaining. Matthews missed the final three games of the regular season due to an ankle injury. Following the season, he was a 2019 All-Big Ten honorable mention selection (media). On March 21, Matthews posted a game-high 22 points and ten rebounds for his seventh career double-double in a 74–55 victory over Montana in the first round of the 2019 NCAA tournament. Following the season, on April 9, 2019, Matthews (along with teammates Iggy Brazdeikis and Jordan Poole) declared for the 2019 NBA draft with the intention of hiring agents. On April 17, Matthews announced, via the Michigan basketball Twitter account, that he would forgo his remaining year of eligibility at Michigan.

== Professional career ==
=== Canton / Cleveland Charge (2021–2022) ===
On June 9, 2019, Matthews tore his anterior cruciate ligament during a predraft workout with the Boston Celtics and subsequently went undrafted in the 2019 NBA draft.

Matthews signed with the Cleveland Cavaliers for the 2020–21 preseason. For the 2020–21 regular season, he joined the Canton Charge of the NBA G League.

On October 23, 2021, Matthews re-signed with the since-renamed Cleveland Charge. On January 20, 2022, he was waived.

=== Memphis Hustle (2022) ===
On February 24, 2022, Matthews was acquired via available player pool by the Memphis Hustle. On March 11, 2022, he was waived.

=== Maine Celtics (2022) ===
On March 14, 2022, Matthews was acquired via available player pool by the Maine Celtics.

=== Windy City Bulls (2022–2023) ===
On October 23, 2022, Matthews joined the Windy City Bulls training camp roster.

=== BC Luleå (Sweden) (2024) ===
On January 28, 2024, Matthews joined the Swedish basketball team BC Luleå and started his journey as a professional basketball player in Europe.

=== Return to Memphis (2025) ===
On February 1, 2025, Matthews joined the Memphis Hustle.

== Personal life ==
Matthews' parents are Nichole and Charles Matthews who met at Southern Illinois University. His older brother, Dominique, was a St. Rita's teammate until he graduated in 2014. Dominique went on to play for the UIC Flames. His younger brother, Jordan, was four classes behind Charles at St. Rita's.

Matthews and his co-founders of The Players Trunk appeared on the final thirteenth-season episode of Shark Tank. They asked for $650,000 in exchange for 5% of their business. However, Mark Cuban and Kevin Hart offered them $650,000 for a 30% stake and they declined the offer.

== Career statistics ==
Legend
GP	Games played	GS	Games started	MPG	Minutes per game
FG%	Field goal percentage	3P%	3-point field goal percentage	FT%	Free throw percentage
RPG	Rebounds per game	APG	Assists per game	SPG	Steals per game
BPG	Blocks per game	PPG	Points per game	**Bold**	Career high

*	Led NCAA Division I

=== College ===
Year	Team	GP	GS	MPG	FG%	3P%	FT%	RPG	APG	SPG	BPG	PPG
2015–16	Kentucky	36	3	10.3	.442	.250	.412	1.6	.4	.4	.2	1.7
2017–18	Michigan	**41***	**41***	30.1	**.495**	**.318**	.558	**5.5**	**2.4**	.7	**.6**	**13.0**
2018–19	Michigan	34	34	**31.5**	.431	.299	**.645**	5.0	1.4	**1.1**	.5	12.2
Career		111	78	24.1	.464	.308	.576	4.1	1.4	.7	.4	9.1
