= 2018 NCAA Division I men's basketball championship game =

American collegiate basketball game

2018 NCAA Division I men’s basketball championship game
National championship game
Michigan Wolverines	Villanova Wildcats
Big Ten	Big East
(33–7)	(35–4)
62	79
Head coach: John Beilein	Head coach: Jay Wright
- AP: 7
- Coaches: 7
- AP: 2
- Coaches: 2
	1st half	2nd half	Total
Michigan Wolverines	28	34	62
Villanova Wildcats	37	42	79
- Date: April 2, 2018
- Venue: Alamodome, San Antonio, Texas
- MVP: Donte DiVincenzo, Villanova
- Favorite: Villanova by 7
- Referees: Doug Sirmons, Terry Wymer, Jeffrey Anderson
- Attendance: 67,831

United States TV coverage
- Network: TBS; TNT and truTV (TeamCast)
- Announcers: Jim Nantz, Bill Raftery, Grant Hill and Tracy Wolfson (TBS); Matt Park, Jay Feely, and Dr. Sanjay Gupta (Michigan TeamCast - TNT); Scott Graham, Randy Foye, and Kacie McDonnell (Villanova TeamCast - truTV)
- Nielsen Ratings: 7.5 (13.334 million)

The 2018 NCAA Division I men's basketball championship game was the final game of the single-elimination tournament to determine the men's National Collegiate Athletic Association (NCAA) Division I college basketball national champion for the 2017–18 season. The game was played on April 2, 2018, at the Alamodome in San Antonio, Texas, between the Michigan Wolverines and the Villanova Wildcats. Michigan last won the NCAA championship in 1989, while Villanova won the championship in 2016.

Villanova defeated Michigan, 79–62. Donte DiVincenzo, a reserve player, scored 31 points for Villanova, and was named the NCAA basketball tournament Most Outstanding Player. It would be the last national championship game to feature a team from the Big Ten until 2024.

== Participants ==
=== Michigan Wolverines ===
Michigan last won the NCAA Tournament in 1989. This was their seventh appearance in the championship game (1965, 1976, 1989, 1992, 1993, 2013). At one point unranked in the AP Poll, Michigan won their final 14 games before the title game to end the 2017–18 regular season with a 28–7 win–loss record after winning the 2018 Big Ten Conference men's basketball tournament. They earned the No. 3 seed in the West Regional.

Michigan defeated the No. 14 Montana Grizzlies in the first round by a score of 61–47. They then reached the Sweet 16 by defeating the No. 6 Houston Cougars, 64–63, on a buzzer beater by Jordan Poole. They made it to the Elite Eight by defeating the No. 7 Texas A&M Aggies, 99–72. Michigan advanced to the Final Four by defeating the No. 9 Florida State Seminoles, 58–54, and defeated the "Cinderella story" of the tournament, the No. 11 Loyola-Chicago Ramblers, in the Final Four by a score of 69–57. Therefore, Michigan never faced a team seeded higher than sixth on its way to the title game.

=== Villanova Wildcats ===
The Villanova Wildcats had won the NCAA Tournament two years earlier in 2016. In 2017–18, Villanova set the NCAA record for three-point shots in a season and in the NCAA Division I men's basketball tournament. After completing a 30–4 regular season, including winning the 2018 Big East men's basketball tournament, Villanova was ranked No. 1 in the AP Poll and earned the No. 1 seed in the East Regional.

In the first round, Villanova defeated the No. 16 Radford Highlanders, 87–61. Villanova blew out the No. 9 Alabama Crimson Tide by a score of 81–58 in the second round. In the Sweet 16, Villanova beat the West Virginia Mountaineers, 90–78. Villanova won against the No. 3 Texas Tech Red Raiders, 71–59, to make the Final Four. They defeated the Kansas Jayhawks by a score of 95–79 in the Final Four to reach the championship game. In their victory over Kansas, Villanova set an NCAA Tournament Final Four single-game record with 18 three-point shots.

== Starting lineups ==
Michigan	Position		Villanova
Muhammad-Ali Abdur-Rahkman	G		Phil Booth
Zavier Simpson	G		† Jalen Brunson
Isaiah Livers	F		Eric Paschall
Charles Matthews	G	G/F	Mikal Bridges
Moritz Wagner	F		Omari Spellman
† 2018 Consensus First Team All-American

== Game summary ==
TBS

April 2, 2018
8:20 pm CDT

Box score

#W3 Michigan Wolverines 62, #E1 Villanova Wildcats 79
Scoring by half: 28–37, 34–42
Pts: M. Abdur-Rahkman - 23; Rebs: Moritz Wagner - 7 Asts: Zavier Simpson - 2	Pts: D. DiVincenzo - 31; Rebs: Omari Spellman - 11; Asts: D. DiVincenzo - 3

Alamodome, San Antonio, Texas
Attendance: 67,831
Referees: Doug Sirmons, Terry Wymer, Jeffrey Anderson

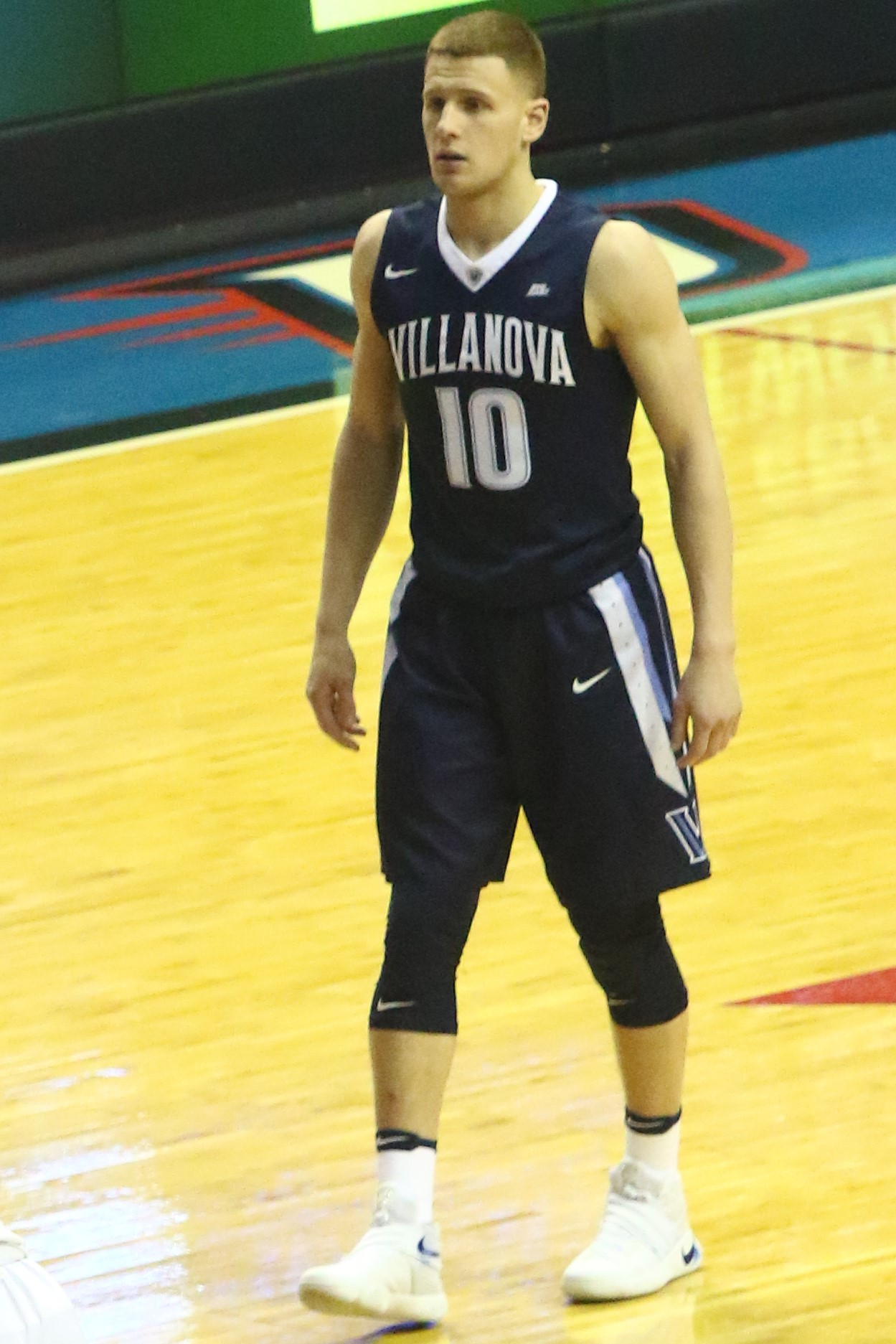
Donte DiVincenzo

The announced attendance for the game was 67,831. During the first half, Moritz Wagner of Michigan scored nine of the team's first 11 points, as Michigan took a 21–14 lead. Villanova went on a 23–7 scoring run to end the half leading Michigan, 37–28. Donte DiVincenzo, who entered the game off of the bench as a reserve player, scored 18 points out of Villanova's first 32. During the second half, DiVincenzo scored 11 consecutive points, putting Villanova 16 points ahead of Michigan. Villanova outscored Michigan by a score of 42–34 in the second half to win the championship by a score of 79–62. Villanova led Michigan in rebounds, 38–27, and limited the Wolverines to three three-point shots.

With the 17 point victory, Villanova won each game in the tournament by double digit margins. DiVincenzo scored a total of 31 points, the most in a national championship game by a player who did not start. DiVincenzo's 31 points led the game, and he was named the NCAA basketball tournament Most Outstanding Player.

With the loss to Villanova, Michigan's record in the national championship game fell to 1–6, the worst record among teams that have previously won a national championship. This was the fourth consecutive loss in the championship game for the Wolverines since the 1989 championship, having previously lost in 1992, 1993, and 2013 (the former two games were vacated due to a scandal). The losing streak would eventually come to an end in 2026, as Michigan defeated UConn to win their second championship.

== Media coverage ==
The National Championship game was broadcast in the United States by TBS. Jim Nantz provided play-by-play, while Bill Raftery and Grant Hill provided color commentary and Tracy Wolfson served as the sideline reporter. The pre-game and post-game shows included analysis by Greg Gumbel, Ernie Johnson Jr., Seth Davis, Clark Kellogg, Kenny Smith, and Charles Barkley. TBS's sister channels, TNT and TruTV, also aired special broadcasts of the game, bring back the "Team Stream" broadcasts that catered to fans of the respective teams. Team Streams, which had been in use since the 2014 Final Four, returned after a one-year hiatus. Philadelphia-based announcer Scott Graham was the play-by-play man for Villanova's stream on TruTV, with former Villanova guard Randy Foye providing color commentary. NESN reporter and Villanova alum Kacie McDonnell worked the sidelines. On TNT's Michigan-centered broadcast, Michigan women's basketball play-by-play announcer Matt Park worked alongside former NFL kicker Jay Feely and CNN medical correspondent Dr. Sanjay Gupta, both Michigan alums. The game drew an estimated 10.3 Nielsen rating across the three networks, the lowest for a national championship game, but the highest on television for the night of April 2.

ESPN International owns the international broadcast rights for 180 countries. In Canada, the game aired on TSN. Radio coverage in the United States was provided by Westwood One.

== See also ==
- 2018 NCAA Division I women's basketball championship game
