= 2022 NCAA Men's Basketball All-Americans =

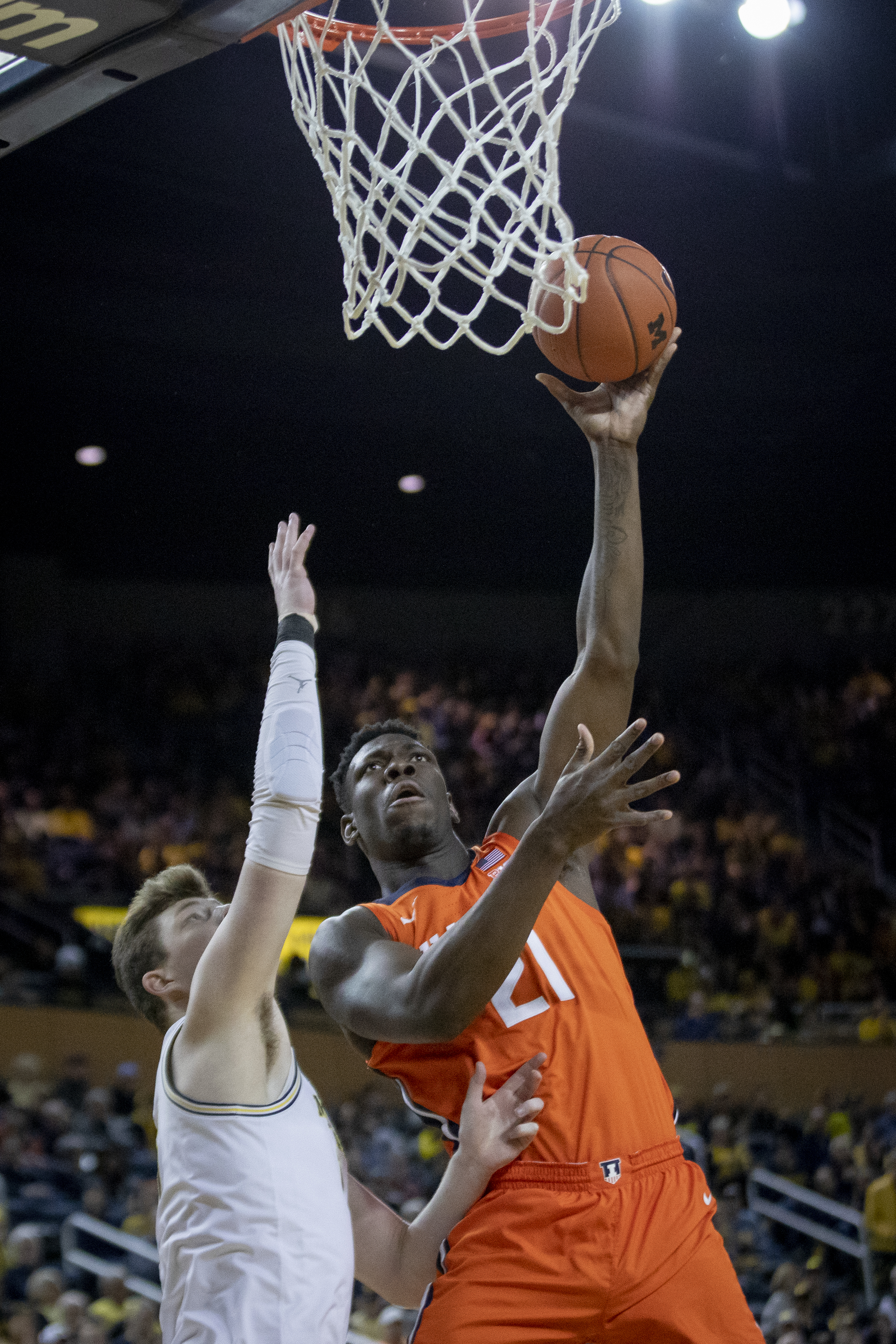
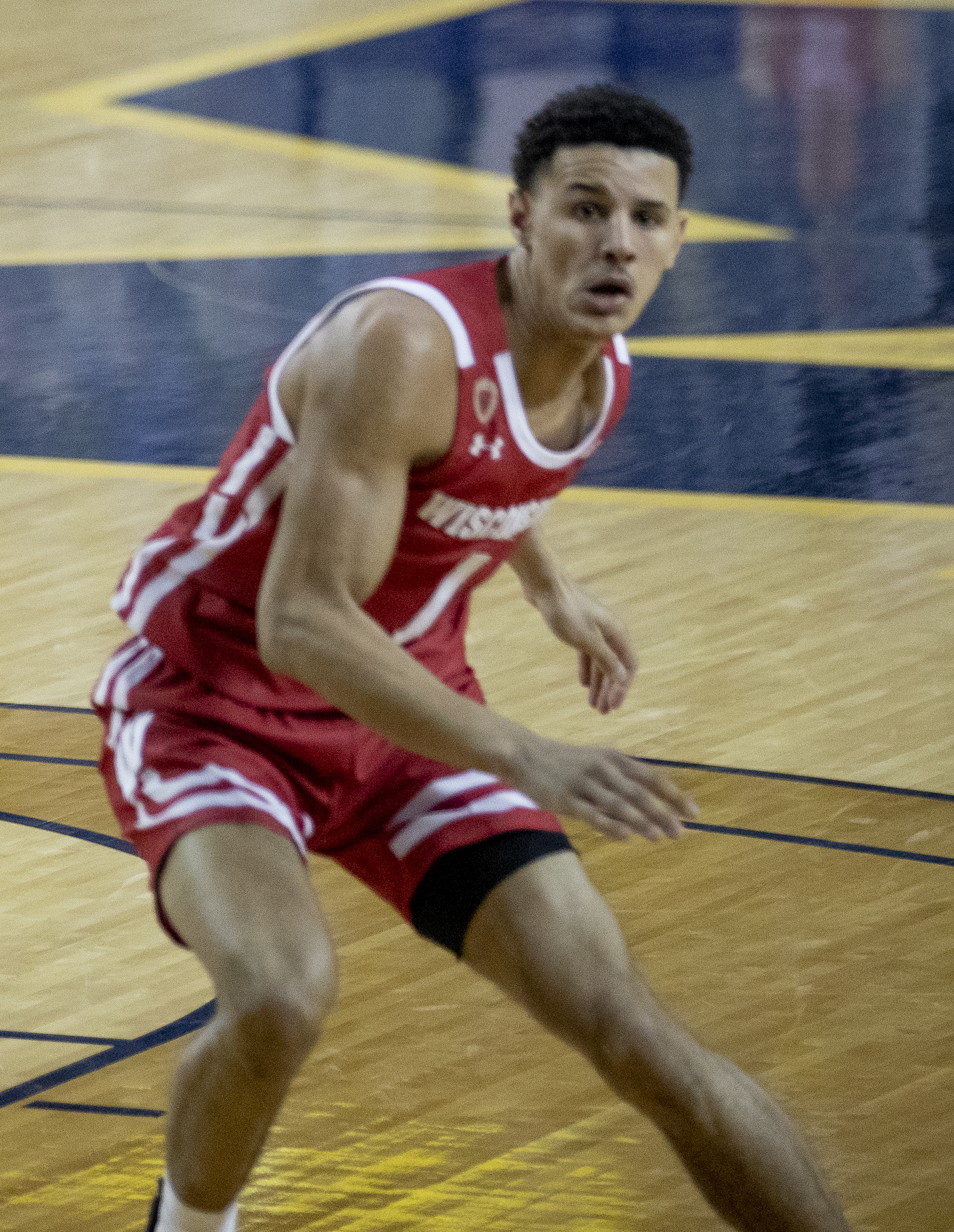
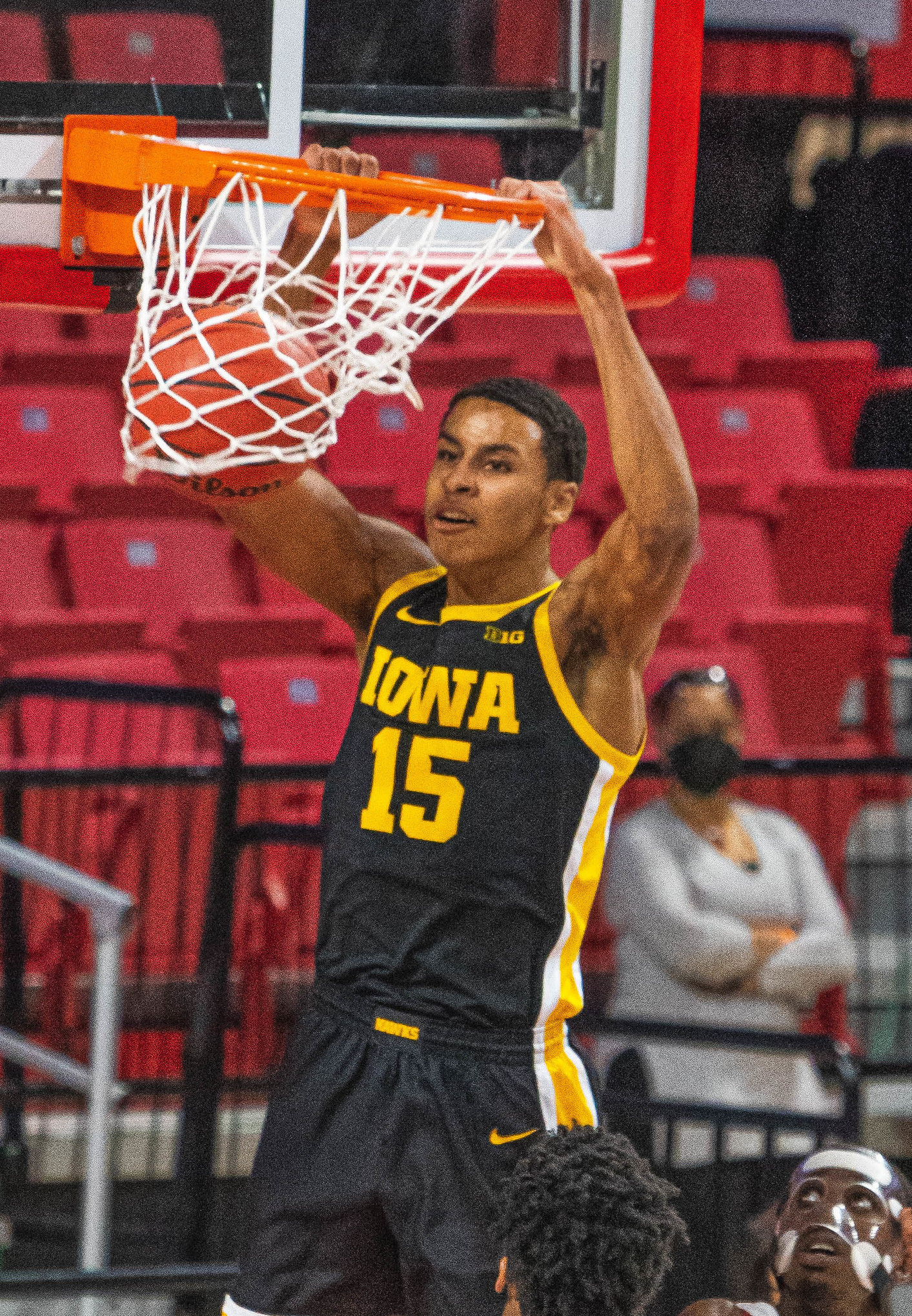
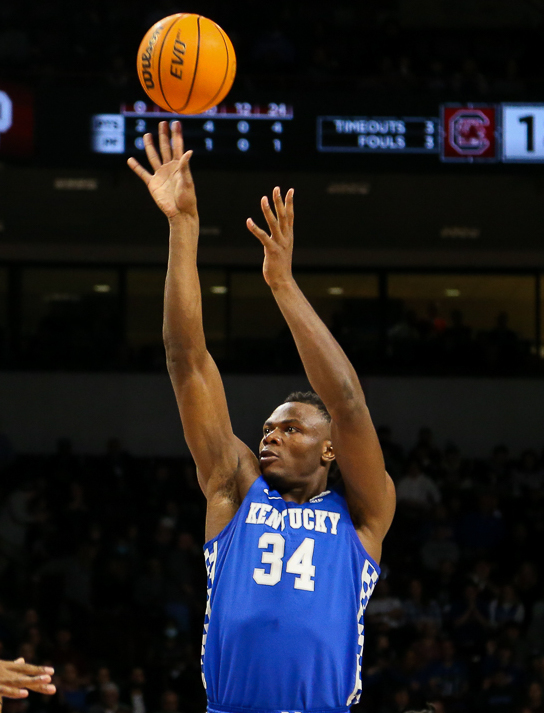
- Members of the 2022 Consensus All-America first team. Clockwise from upper left: Cockburn, Davis, Tshiebwe, Murray; (not pictured: Agbaji).
- Awarded for: 2021–22 NCAA Division I men's basketball season

An All-American team is an honorary sports team composed of the best amateur players of a specific season for each team position—who in turn are given the honorific "All-America" and typically referred to as "All-American athletes", or simply "All-Americans". Although the honorees generally do not compete together as a unit, the term is used in U.S. team sports to refer to players who are selected by members of the national media. Walter Camp selected the first All-America team in the early days of American football in 1889. The 2022 NCAA Men's Basketball All-Americans are honorary lists that include All-American selections from the Associated Press (AP), the United States Basketball Writers Association (USBWA), Sporting News (SN), and the National Association of Basketball Coaches (NABC) for the 2021–22 NCAA Division I men's basketball season. All selectors choose three teams, while AP and USBWA also list honorable mention selections.

The Consensus 2022 College Basketball All-American team was determined by aggregating the results of the four major All-American teams as determined by the National Collegiate Athletic Association (NCAA). Since United Press International was replaced by SN in 1997, the four major selectors have been the aforementioned ones. AP has been a selector since 1948, NABC since 1957 and USBWA since 1960. To earn "consensus" status, a player must win honors based on a point system computed from the four different all-America teams. The point system consists of three points for first team, two points for second team and one point for third team. No honorable mention or fourth team or lower are used in the computation. The top five totals plus ties are first team and the next five plus ties are second team.

Although the aforementioned lists are used to determine consensus honors, there are numerous other All-American lists. The ten finalists for the John Wooden Award are described as Wooden All-Americans. The ten finalists for the Senior CLASS Award are described as Senior All-Americans. Other All-American lists include those determined by USA Today, Fox Sports, Yahoo Sports and many others. The scholar-athletes selected by the College Sports Information Directors of America (CoSIDA) are termed Academic All-Americans.

== 2022 Consensus All-America team ==
PG – Point guard
SG – Shooting guard
PF – Power forward
SF – Small forward
C – Center

Consensus First Team
Player	Position	Class	Team
Ochai Agbaji	G	Senior	Kansas
Kofi Cockburn	C	Junior	Illinois
Johnny Davis	G/F	Sophomore	Wisconsin
Keegan Murray	F	Sophomore	Iowa
Oscar Tshiebwe	F	Junior	Kentucky

Consensus Second Team
Player	Position	Class	Team
Paolo Banchero	F	Freshman	Duke
Chet Holmgren	F	Freshman	Gonzaga
Jaden Ivey	G	Sophomore	Purdue
Bennedict Mathurin	G	Sophomore	Arizona
Jabari Smith	F	Freshman	Auburn
Drew Timme	F	Junior	Gonzaga

== Individual All-America teams ==
=== By player ===
Player	School	AP	USBWA	NABC	SN	CP	Notes
Ochai Agbaji	Kansas	1	1	1	1	12	NCAA Final Four Most Outstanding Player, Big 12 Player of the Year
Kofi Cockburn	Illinois	1	1	1	1	12	
Johnny Davis	Wisconsin	1	1	1	1	12	Jerry West Award, Lute Olson Award, Big Ten Player of the Year
Oscar Tshiebwe	Kentucky	1	1	1	1	12	Naismith Player of the Year, Wooden Award, AP Player of the Year, NABC Player of the Year, Oscar Robertson Trophy, Sporting News Player of the Year, Kareem Abdul-Jabbar Award, Pete Newell Big Man Award, SEC Player of the Year
Keegan Murray	Iowa	1	1	2	1	11	Karl Malone Award
Jaden Ivey	Purdue	2	2	1	2	9	
Bennedict Mathurin	Arizona	2	2	2	2	8	Pac-12 Player of the Year
Jabari Smith	Auburn	2	2	2	2	8	Wayman Tisdale Award, NABC Freshman of the Year
Drew Timme	Gonzaga	2	2	2	2	8	WCC Player of the Year
Paolo Banchero	Duke	3	2	2	3	6	
Chet Holmgren	Gonzaga	2	3	3	2	6	
James Akinjo	Baylor	3	3	3	3	4	
Collin Gillespie	Villanova	3	3	3	3	4	Bob Cousy Award, Big East Player of the Year
E. J. Liddell	Ohio State	3	3	3	3	4	
Walker Kessler	Auburn	3	3			2	NABC Defensive Player of the Year, Naismith Defensive Player of the Year
JD Notae	Arkansas	3			3	2	
Johnny Juzang	UCLA			3		1	

=== By team ===
All-America Team
All-America Team	First team		Second team		Third team	
All-America Team	Player	School	Player	School	Player	School
Associated Press	Ochai Agbaji	Kansas	Chet Holmgren	Gonzaga	James Akinjo	Baylor
Associated Press	Kofi Cockburn	Illinois	Jaden Ivey	Purdue	Paolo Banchero	Duke
Associated Press	Johnny Davis	Wisconsin	Bennedict Mathurin	Arizona	Collin Gillespie	Villanova
Associated Press	Keegan Murray	Iowa	Jabari Smith	Auburn	Walker Kessler	Auburn
Associated Press	Oscar Tshiebwe	Kentucky	Drew Timme	Gonzaga	E. J. Liddell	Ohio State
Associated Press					JD Notae	Arkansas
USBWA	Ochai Agbaji	Kansas	Paolo Banchero	Duke	James Akinjo	Baylor
USBWA	Kofi Cockburn	Illinois	Jaden Ivey	Purdue	Collin Gillespie	Villanova
USBWA	Johnny Davis	Wisconsin	Bennedict Mathurin	Arizona	Chet Holmgren	Gonzaga
USBWA	Keegan Murray	Iowa	Jabari Smith	Auburn	Walker Kessler	Auburn
USBWA	Oscar Tshiebwe	Kentucky	Drew Timme	Gonzaga	E. J. Liddell	Ohio State
NABC	Ochai Agbaji	Kansas	Paolo Banchero	Duke	James Akinjo	Baylor
NABC	Kofi Cockburn	Illinois	Bennedict Mathurin	Arizona	Collin Gillespie	Villanova
NABC	Johnny Davis	Wisconsin	Keegan Murray	Iowa	Chet Holmgren	Gonzaga
NABC	Jaden Ivey	Purdue	Jabari Smith	Auburn	Johnny Juzang	UCLA
NABC	Oscar Tshiebwe	Kentucky	Drew Timme	Gonzaga	E. J. Liddell	Ohio State
Sporting News
Sporting News	Ochai Agbaji	Kansas	Chet Holmgren	Gonzaga	James Akinjo	Baylor
Sporting News	Kofi Cockburn	Illinois	Jaden Ivey	Purdue	Paolo Banchero	Duke
Sporting News	Johnny Davis	Wisconsin	Bennedict Mathurin	Arizona	Collin Gillespie	Villanova
Sporting News	Keegan Murray	Iowa	Jabari Smith	Auburn	E. J. Liddell	Ohio State
Sporting News	Oscar Tshiebwe	Kentucky	Drew Timme	Gonzaga	JD Notae	Arkansas

AP Honorable Mention:

- Max Abmas, Oral Roberts
- Armando Bacot, North Carolina
- Tari Eason, LSU
- Zach Edey, Purdue
- Ron Harper Jr., Rutgers
- Johnny Juzang, UCLA
- David Roddy, Colorado State
- Alondes Williams, Wake Forest

USBWA Honorable Mention:

- Armando Bacot, North Carolina
- Johnny Juzang, UCLA
- JD Notae, Arkansas
- David Roddy, Colorado State
- Alondes Williams, Wake Forest

== Academic All-Americans ==
The College Sports Information Directors of America (CoSIDA) announced its 15-member 2021 Academic All-America team on March 15, 2022, divided into first, second and third teams, with Ben Vander Plas of Ohio chosen as men's college basketball Academic All-American of the Year.

First Team
Player	School	Class	GPA and major
Ben Vander Plas (Note: Second team in 2020–21.)	Ohio	GS	3.96/3.79, Management
Jimmy Boeheim (Note: Second team in 2019–20.)	Syracuse	GS	3.78/4.00, Education
Tanner Groves	Oklahoma	GS	3.89/4.80, Organizational Leadership
Hunter Schofield	Dixie State	Sr.	3.94, Exercise Science
JT Shumate	Toledo	Sr.	3.85, Middle Childhood Education

Second Team
Player	School	Class	GPA and major
Antoine Davis	Detroit Mercy	Jr.	3.39, Communications
Matt Dentlinger (Note: Third team in 2020–21.)	South Dakota State	GS	3.99/4.00, Engineering
AJ Green	Northern Iowa	Sr.	3.67, Movement, Exercise Science & Sport Psychology
Gibson Jimerson	Saint Louis	Jr.	3.90, International Business
Kahliel Spear	Robert Morris	Sr.	3.92, Economics

Third Team
Player	School	Class	GPA and major
Josh Bannan	Montana	So.	3.91, Business Economics
Justin Bean	Utah State	GS	3.34/3.33, Kinesiology & Nutrition Science
Rocky Kreuser	North Dakota State	GS	3.62/4.00, University Studies (UG) / Health, Nutrition & Exercise Science
Chris Ledlum	Harvard	Jr.	3.47, Management (UG) / MBA (G)
Luke Smith	Belmont	GS	3.67/3.92, Business Administration (UG) / MBA (G)

== Senior All-Americans ==
The 10 finalists for the Senior CLASS Award, called Senior All-Americans, were announced on February 10, 2022. The first and second teams were announced on April 1, with Jacob Gilyard of Richmond named as the recipient.

=== First team ===
Player	Position	School
Jacob Gilyard	Guard	Richmond
Evan Battey	Forward	Colorado
Brad Davison	Guard	Wisconsin
Sasha Stefanovic	Guard	Purdue
Lucas Williamson	Guard	Loyola Chicago

=== Second team ===
Player	Position	School
Trent Frazier	Guard	Illinois
Tanner Groves	Forward-center	Oklahoma
Gavin Kensmil	Forward	Stephen F. Austin
Kameron McGusty	Guard	Miami (Florida)
Alex Morales	Guard	Wagner
