= 2018–19 Wisconsin Badgers men's basketball team =

American college basketball season

2018–19 Wisconsin Badgers men's basketball

NCAA tournament, First Round
- Conference: Big Ten Conference

Ranking
- Coaches: No. 24
- AP: No. 21
- Record: 23–11 (14–6 Big Ten)
- Head coach: Greg Gard (4th season)
- Assistant coaches: Howard Moore; Joe Krabbenhoft; Dean Oliver
- Home arena: Kohl Center

2018–19 Big Ten Conference men's basketball standings
| | Conf. | | | | Overall |
| Team | W | | L | PCT | W | | L | PCT |
|---|---|---|---|---|---|---|---|---|
| No. 5 Michigan State † | 16 | – | 4 | .800 | 32 | – | 7 | .821 |
| No. 13 Purdue | 16 | – | 4 | .800 | 26 | – | 10 | .722 |
| No. 8 Michigan | 15 | – | 5 | .750 | 30 | – | 7 | .811 |
| No. 21 Wisconsin | 14 | – | 6 | .700 | 23 | – | 11 | .676 |
| Maryland | 13 | – | 7 | .650 | 23 | – | 11 | .676 |
| Iowa | 10 | – | 10 | .500 | 23 | – | 12 | .657 |
| Minnesota | 9 | – | 11 | .450 | 22 | – | 14 | .611 |
| Ohio State | 8 | – | 12 | .400 | 20 | – | 15 | .571 |
| Indiana | 8 | – | 12 | .400 | 19 | – | 16 | .543 |
| Penn State | 7 | – | 13 | .350 | 14 | – | 18 | .438 |
| Illinois | 7 | – | 13 | .350 | 12 | – | 21 | .364 |
| Rutgers | 7 | – | 13 | .350 | 14 | – | 17 | .452 |
| Nebraska | 6 | – | 14 | .300 | 19 | – | 17 | .528 |
| Northwestern | 4 | – | 16 | .200 | 13 | – | 19 | .406 |
† 2019 Big Ten tournament winner Rankings from AP poll

The 2018–19 Wisconsin Badgers men's basketball team represented the University of Wisconsin–Madison in the 2018–19 NCAA Division I men's basketball season. The Badgers were led by fourth-year head coach Greg Gard and played their home games at the Kohl Center in Madison, Wisconsin as members of the Big Ten Conference. They finished the season 23–11, 14–6 in Big Ten play to finish in fourth place. In the Big Ten tournament, the Badgers defeated Nebraska in the quarterfinals before losing to Michigan State in the semifinals. They received an at-large bid to the NCAA tournament as the No. 5 seed in the South Region, their 24th trip to the NCAA Tournament. They were upset in the First Round by No. 12-seeded Oregon.

== Previous season ==
The Badgers finished the 2017–18 season 15–18, 7–11 in Big Ten play to finish in ninth place. They defeated eighth-seeded Maryland in the Big Ten tournament, but lost to top-seeded Michigan State in the next round. They failed to reach the NCAA tournament for the first time since 1998.

== Offseason ==
=== Departures ===
| Name | Number | Pos. | Height | Weight | Year | Hometown | Notes |
|---|---|---|---|---|---|---|---|
| Matt Ferris | 4 | G | 6'6" | 205 | RS Junior | Appleton, WI | Graduated |
| Aaron Moesch | 5 | F | 6'8" | 220 | RS Senior | Green Bay, WI | Graduated |
| T. J. Schlundt | 20 | G | 6'5" | 197 | RS Junior | Oconomowoc, WI | Graduated |
| Alex Illikainen | 25 | F | 6'9" | 231 | Senior | Grand Rapids, MN | Quit prior to season; transferred to University of Minnesota Duluth (D2) after fall semester |
| Andy Van Vliet | 33 | F | 7'0" | 228 | Junior | Antwerp, Belgium | Transferred to William & Mary |

=== Incoming transfers ===
| Name | Number | Pos. | Height | Weight | Year | Hometown | Previous School |
|---|---|---|---|---|---|---|---|
| Micah Potter | 11 | C | 6'9" | 240 | Junior | Mentor, OH | Transferred from Ohio State. Under NCAA transfer rules, Potter will have to sit out for the 2018–19 season. Will have two years of remaining eligibility. |
| Owen Hamilton | 30 | C | 7'0" | 266 | Sophomore | Prescott, WI | Walk-on; transferred from Northern Illinois |

=== Returning players ===
Redshirt junior forward Ethan Happ announced his intent to enter the NBA draft on April 2, 2018, without hiring an agent. He withdrew himself from the draft on May 30 after not being invited to the combine.

=== 2018 Recruiting class ===
College recruiting information
| Name | Hometown | School | Height | Weight | Commit date |
|---|---|---|---|---|---|
| Joe Hedstrom; C | Minnetonka, MN | Hopkins High School | 6 ft 10 in (2.08 m) | 200 lb (91 kg) | Oct 11, 2017 |
| Joe Hedstrom; C | Recruit ratings: Scout: Rivals: 247Sports: (N/A) | | | | |
| Taylor Currie; PF | Clarkston, MI | Clarkston High School | 6 ft 8 in (2.03 m) | 200 lb (91 kg) | Oct 31, 2017 |
| Taylor Currie; PF | Recruit ratings: Scout: Rivals: 247Sports: (N/A) | | | | |
| Tai Strickland; PG | Tampa, FL | St. Petersburg High School | 6 ft 2 in (1.88 m) | 180 lb (82 kg) | Mar 27, 2018 |
| Tai Strickland; PG | Recruit ratings: Scout: Rivals: 247Sports: (79) | | | | |
Overall recruit ranking:
Note: In many cases, Scout, Rivals, 247Sports, On3, and ESPN may conflict in their listings of height and weight.; In these cases, the average was taken. ESPN grades are on a 100-point scale.; Sources: "2018 Wisconsin Commitments". Rivals.; "Men's Basketball Recruiting". Scout.; "ESPN- Wisconsin Badgers Men's Basketball Recruiting". ESPN.; "Scout.com Team Recruiting Rankings". Scout.; "2018 Team Ranking". Rivals.

== Roster ==
2018–19 Wisconsin Badgers men's basketball team
Players
Coaches

| Pos. | # | Name | Height | Weight | Year | Previous school | Hometown |
|---|---|---|---|---|---|---|---|
| G | 0 | D'Mitrik Trice | 6 ft 0 in (1.83 m) | 187 lb (85 kg) | RS So | Wayne High School (OH) | Huber Heights, Ohio |
| G | 1 | Brevin Pritzl | 6 ft 3 in (1.91 m) | 198 lb (90 kg) | RS Jr | De Pere High School | De Pere, Wisconsin |
| F | 2 | Aleem Ford | 6 ft 8 in (2.03 m) | 220 lb (100 kg) | RS So | Archer High School | Lawrenceville, Georgia |
| G | 3 | Walt McGrory (W) | 6 ft 3 in (1.91 m) | 200 lb (91 kg) | So | Edina High School | Edina, Minnesota |
| G | 4 | Carter Higginbottom (W) (redshirt) | 6 ft 0 in (1.83 m) | 183 lb (83 kg) | Fr | St. Ignatius College Prep (IL) | Chicago, Illinois |
| F | 11 | Micah Potter (redshirt) | 6 ft 9 in (2.06 m) | 240 lb (109 kg) | Jr | Montverde Academy/Ohio State | Mentor, Ohio |
| G | 12 | Trevor Anderson (injured) (W) | 6 ft 2 in (1.88 m) | 201 lb (91 kg) | RS So | Stevens Point H.S./Green Bay | Stevens Point, Wisconsin |
| G | 13 | Tai Strickland | 6 ft 2 in (1.88 m) | 172 lb (78 kg) | Fr | St. Petersburg High School | Tampa, Florida |
| F | 15 | Charles Thomas IV | 6 ft 8 in (2.03 m) | 250 lb (113 kg) | Sr | River Hill High School | Highland, Maryland |
| G/F | 21 | Khalil Iverson | 6 ft 5 in (1.96 m) | 217 lb (98 kg) | Sr | Rutherford B. Hayes High School (OH) | Delaware, Ohio |
| F | 22 | Ethan Happ | 6 ft 10 in (2.08 m) | 237 lb (108 kg) | RS Sr | Rockridge High School | Milan, Illinois |
| G | 23 | Kobe King | 6 ft 4 in (1.93 m) | 203 lb (92 kg) | RS Fr | La Crosse Central High School | La Crosse, Wisconsin |
| C | 30 | Owen Hamilton (W) (redshirt) | 7 ft 0 in (2.13 m) | 266 lb (121 kg) | So | Prescott H.S. (WI)/Northern Illinois | Prescott, Wisconsin |
| G | 31 | Michael Ballard (W) | 6 ft 4 in (1.93 m) | 197 lb (89 kg) | RS So | Fenwick High School (IL) | Oak Park, Illinois |
| C | 32 | Joe Hedstrom (W) (redshirt) | 7 ft 0 in (2.13 m) | 223 lb (101 kg) | Fr | Hopkins High School | Hopkins, Minnesota |
| F | 33 | Taylor Currie (redshirt) | 6 ft 8 in (2.03 m) | 226 lb (103 kg) | Fr | Clarkston High School (MI) | Clarkston, Michigan |
| G | 34 | Brad Davison | 6 ft 3 in (1.91 m) | 206 lb (93 kg) | So | Maple Grove High School | Maple Grove, Minnesota |
| F | 35 | Nate Reuvers | 6 ft 11 in (2.11 m) | 240 lb (109 kg) | So | Lakeville North High School | Lakeville, Minnesota |

Head coach

- Greg Gard (UW-Platteville)

Assistant coach(es)

- Howard Moore (Wisconsin)
- Joe Krabbenhoft (Wisconsin)
- Dean Oliver (Iowa)

Legend

- (C) Team captain
- (S) Suspended
- (I) Ineligible
- (W) Walk-on
- Injured
- Current redshirt

Roster

== Schedule and results ==
| Date time, TV | Rank^{#} | Opponent^{#} | Result | Record | High points | High rebounds | High assists | Site (attendance) city, state |
Exhibition
| November 2, 2018*; 7:00 pm, BTN Plus | | UW–Oshkosh | W 82–70 | – | 16 – Davison | 7 – Pritzl | 4 – Tied | Kohl Center (–); Madison, WI |
Regular season
| November 6, 2018*; 7:00 pm, BTN Plus | | Coppin State | W 85–63 | 1–0 | 21 – Trice | 11 – Happ | 12 – Happ | Kohl Center (17,287); Madison, WI |
| November 13, 2018*; 5:30 pm, FS1 | | at Xavier; Gavitt Tipoff Games | W 77–68 | 2–0 | 30 – Happ | 13 – Happ | 5 – Tied | Cintas Center (10,312); Cincinnati, OH |
| November 17, 2018*; 7:00 pm, BTN | | Houston Baptist | W 96–59 | 3–0 | 17 – Pritzl | 12 – Happ | 6 – Happ | Kohl Center (17,287); Madison, WI |
| November 21, 2018*; 1:30 pm, ESPN | No. 25 | vs. Stanford; Battle 4 Atlantis Quarterfinals | W 62–46 | 4–0 | 16 – Tied | 12 – Tied | 1 – Tied | Imperial Arena (1,573); Nassau, BAH |
| November 22, 2018*; 12:30 pm, ESPN | No. 25 | vs. Oklahoma; Battle 4 Atlantis Semifinals | W 78–58 | 5–0 | 25 – Trice | 12 – Happ | 5 – Happ | Imperial Arena (1,182); Nassau, BAH |
| November 23, 2018*; 1:00 pm, ESPN | No. 25 | vs. No. 4 Virginia; Battle 4 Atlantis Championship | L 46–53 | 5–1 | 22 – Happ | 15 – Happ | 6 – Happ | Imperial Arena (2,249); Nassau, BAH |
| November 27, 2018*; 8:00 pm, ESPN2 | No. 22 | NC State; ACC–Big Ten Challenge | W 79–75 | 6–1 | 19 – Happ | 11 – Happ | 6 – Trice | Kohl Center (17,012); Madison, WI |
| November 30, 2018; 7:00 pm, BTN | No. 22 | at No. 14 Iowa | W 72–66 | 7–1 (1–0) | 20 – Trice | 7 – Tied | 5 – Happ | Carver-Hawkeye Arena (15,056); Iowa City, IA |
| December 3, 2018; 7:00 pm, BTN | No. 12 | Rutgers | W 69–64 | 8–1 (2–0) | 20 – Happ | 4 – Tied | 3 – Happ | Kohl Center (17,082); Madison, WI |
| December 8, 2018*; 4:00 pm, FOX | No. 12 | at Marquette; Rivalry | L 69–74 ^{OT} | 8–2 | 34 – Happ | 11 – Happ | 4 – Happ | Fiserv Forum (17,515); Milwaukee, WI |
| December 13, 2018*; 7:00 pm, BTN | No. 16 | Savannah State | W 101–60 | 9–2 | 24 – Davison | 11 – Happ | 6 – Tied | Kohl Center (17,004); Madison, WI |
| December 22, 2018*; 11:00 am, BTN | No. 16 | Grambling State | W 84–53 | 10–2 | 19 – Happ | 8 – Happ | 5 – Happ | Kohl Center (17,183); Madison, WI |
| December 29, 2018*; 4:30 pm, CBSSN | No. 15 | at Western Kentucky | L 76–83 | 10–3 | 26 – Davison | 12 – Happ | 3 – Tied | E.A. Diddle Arena (7,614); Bowling Green, KY |
| January 3, 2019; 8:00 pm, BTN | No. 22 | Minnesota | L 52–59 | 10–4 (2–1) | 17 – Happ | 8 – Happ | 3 – Happ | Kohl Center (16,687); Madison, WI |
| January 6, 2019; 6:30 pm, BTN | No. 22 | at Penn State | W 71–52 | 11–4 (3–1) | 22 – Happ | 8 – Happ | 4 – Tied | Bryce Jordan Center (8,342); University Park, PA |
| January 11, 2019; 8:00 pm, FS1 | | Purdue | L 80–84 ^{OT} | 11–5 (3–2) | 31 – Happ | 13 – Happ | 6 – Happ | Kohl Center (17,187); Madison, WI |
| January 14, 2019; 7:30 pm, FS1 | | at No. 19 Maryland | L 60–64 | 11–6 (3–3) | 18 – Reuvers | 8 – Happ | 5 – Trice | Xfinity Center (12,894); College Park, MD |
| January 19, 2019; 11:00 am, ESPN | | No. 2 Michigan | W 64–54 | 12–6 (4–3) | 26 – Happ | 10 – Happ | 7 – Happ | Kohl Center (17,287); Madison, WI |
| January 23, 2019; 8:00 pm, BTN | | at Illinois | W 72–60 | 13–6 (5–3) | 22 – Reuvers | 10 – Reuvers | 6 – Happ | State Farm Center (12,294); Champaign, IL |
| January 26, 2019; 1:15 pm, BTN | | Northwestern | W 62–46 | 14–6 (6–3) | 18 – Tied | 12 – Happ | 11 – Happ | Kohl Center (17,287); Madison, WI |
| January 29, 2019; 7:00 pm, BTN | No. 24 | at Nebraska | W 62–51 | 15–6 (7–3) | 13 – Davison | 9 – Happ | 4 – Happ | Pinnacle Bank Arena (15,739); Lincoln, NE |
| February 1, 2019; 8:00 pm, FS1 | No. 24 | No. 21 Maryland | W 69–61 | 16–6 (8–3) | 21 – Davison | 11 – Happ | 6 – Happ | Kohl Center (17,287); Madison, WI |
| February 6, 2019; 8:00 pm, BTN | No. 19 | at Minnesota | W 56–51 | 17–6 (9–3) | 15 – Happ | 13 – Happ | 4 – Happ | Williams Arena (14,625); Minneapolis, MN |
| February 9, 2019; 11:00 am, FOX | No. 19 | at No. 7 Michigan | L 52–61 | 17–7 (9–4) | 18 – Happ | 11 – Happ | 1 – Tied | Crisler Center (12,707); Ann Arbor, MI |
| February 12, 2019; 6:00 pm, ESPN2 | No. 20 | No. 11 Michigan State | L 59–67 | 17–8 (9–5) | 20 – Happ | 12 – Happ | 3 – Tied | Kohl Center (17,287); Madison, WI |
| February 18, 2019; 7:00 pm, FS1 | No. 22 | Illinois | W 64–58 | 18–8 (10–5) | 18 – Davison | 10 – Pritzl | 3 – Davison | Kohl Center (17,152); Madison, WI |
| February 23, 2019; 7:30 pm, BTN | No. 22 | at Northwestern | W 69–64 | 19–8 (11–5) | 16 – Davison | 10 – Happ | 3 – Tied | Welsh–Ryan Arena (7,039); Evanston, IL |
| February 26, 2019; 8:00 pm, ESPN | No. 19 | at Indiana | L 73–75 ^{2OT} | 19–9 (11–6) | 23 – Happ | 11 – Happ | 4 – Happ | Simon Skjodt Assembly Hall (17,222); Bloomington, IN |
| March 2, 2019; 12:00 pm, BTN | No. 19 | Penn State | W 61–57 | 20–9 (12–6) | 17 – Pritzl | 9 – Reuvers | 5 – Happ | Kohl Center (17,287); Madison, WI |
| March 7, 2019; 6:00 pm, ESPN | No. 21 | Iowa | W 65–45 | 21–9 (13–6) | 21 – Happ | 14 – Happ | 4 – Trice | Kohl Center (17,287); Madison, WI |
| March 10, 2019; 3:30 pm, CBS | No. 21 | at Ohio State | W 73–67 ^{OT} | 22–9 (14–6) | 22 – Iverson | 14 – Tied | 8 – Happ | Value City Arena (18,231); Columbus, OH |
Big Ten tournament
| March 15, 2019; 2:00 pm, BTN | (4) No. 19 | vs. (13) Nebraska; Quarterfinals | W 66–62 | 23–9 | 14 – Tied | 7 – Happ | 4 – Tied | United Center (17,369); Chicago, IL |
| March 16, 2019; 12:00 pm, CBS | (4) No. 19 | vs. (1) No. 6 Michigan State; Semifinals | L 55–67 | 23–10 | 20 – Happ | 6 – Happ | 3 – Happ | United Center (18,468); Chicago, IL |
NCAA tournament
| March 22, 2019*; 3:30 pm, TBS | (5 S) No. 21 | vs. (12 S) Oregon; First Round | L 54–72 | 23–11 | 12 – Tied | 8 – Happ | 5 – Trice | SAP Center (14,331); San Jose, CA |
*Non-conference game. ^{#}Rankings from AP Poll. (#) Tournament seedings in parentheses. S=South. All times are in Central Time.

== Rankings ==
Ranking movements Legend: ██ Increase in ranking ██ Decrease in ranking — = Not ranked RV = Received votes
| | Week | | | | | | | | | | | | | | | | | | | | |
| Poll | Pre | 1 | 2 | 3 | 4 | 5 | 6 | 7 | 8 | 9 | 10 | 11 | 12 | 13 | 14 | 15 | 16 | 17 | 18 | 19 | Final |
|---|---|---|---|---|---|---|---|---|---|---|---|---|---|---|---|---|---|---|---|---|---|
| AP | RV | RV | RV | 25 | 22 | 12 | 16 | 16 | 15 | 22 | RV | RV | RV | 24 | 19 | 20 | 22 | 19 | 21 | 19 | 21 |
| Coaches | RV | — | — | RV | 22 | 16 | 19 | 17 | 16 | 23 | RV | RV | RV | 23 | 19 | 23 | 23 | 18 | 21 | 19 | 21 |

^Coaches did not release a Week 1 poll.
*AP does not release post-NCAA tournament rankings

== Player statistics ==
Individual player statistics
| | | | Minutes | | Scoring | | Total FGs | | | 3-point FGs | | | Free throws | | | Rebounds | | | | | | | | |
| Player | GP | GS | Tot | Avg | Pts | Avg | FG | FGA | Pct | 3FG | 3FA | Pct | FT | FTA | Pct | Off | Def | Tot | Avg | A | TO | Blk | Stl | PF |
|---|---|---|---|---|---|---|---|---|---|---|---|---|---|---|---|---|---|---|---|---|---|---|---|---|
| Happ, Ethan | 34 | 34 | 1089 | 32.0 | 589 | 17.3 | 257 | 485 | .530 | 0 | 5 | .000 | 75 | 161 | .466 | 77 | 265 | 342 | 10.1 | 153 | 104 | 44 | 38 | 87 |
| Trice, D'Mitrik | 34 | 34 | 1107 | 32.6 | 393 | 11.6 | 133 | 346 | .384 | 76 | 195 | .390 | 51 | 68 | .750 | 6 | 88 | 94 | 2.8 | 90 | 45 | 1 | 30 | 65 |
| Davison, Brad | 34 | 34 | 1096 | 32.2 | 358 | 10.5 | 115 | 299 | .385 | 52 | 149 | .349 | 76 | 94 | .809 | 10 | 101 | 111 | 3.3 | 62 | 34 | 2 | 36 | 79 |
| Reuvers, Nate | 34 | 34 | 779 | 22.9 | 268 | 7.9 | 105 | 234 | .449 | 32 | 84 | .381 | 26 | 41 | .634 | 42 | 91 | 133 | 3.9 | 34 | 32 | 60 | 10 | 81 |
| Iverson, Khalil | 33 | 33 | 810 | 24.5 | 227 | 6.9 | 89 | 164 | .543 | 1 | 6 | .167 | 48 | 77 | .623 | 48 | 102 | 150 | 4.5 | 30 | 36 | 13 | 31 | 58 |
| Pritzl, Brevin | 34 | 0 | 668 | 19.6 | 162 | 4.8 | 50 | 108 | .463 | 32 | 78 | .410 | 30 | 36 | .833 | 15 | 68 | 83 | 2.4 | 17 | 10 | 3 | 10 | 36 |
| King, Kobe | 34 | 1 | 646 | 19.0 | 144 | 4.2 | 55 | 123 | .447 | 15 | 49 | .306 | 19 | 29 | .655 | 20 | 53 | 73 | 2.1 | 17 | 17 | 3 | 9 | 27 |
| Ford, Aleem | 31 | 0 | 429 | 13.8 | 97 | 3.1 | 35 | 103 | .340 | 23 | 80 | .288 | 4 | 4 | 1.000 | 11 | 48 | 59 | 1.9 | 11 | 16 | 4 | 8 | 44 |
| Strickland, Tai | 16 | 0 | 50 | 3.1 | 28 | 1.8 | 9 | 23 | .391 | 4 | 8 | .500 | 6 | 8 | .750 | 1 | 4 | 5 | 0.3 | 7 | 5 | 0 | 2 | 5 |
| Anderson, Trevor | 8 | 0 | 55 | 6.9 | 13 | 1.6 | 6 | 10 | .600 | 1 | 1 | 1.000 | 0 | 0 | .000 | 1 | 8 | 9 | 1.1 | 3 | 1 | 0 | 0 | 3 |
| Thomas IV, Charles | 29 | 0 | 147 | 5.1 | 46 | 1.6 | 18 | 41 | .439 | 3 | 10 | .300 | 7 | 11 | .636 | 18 | 18 | 36 | 1.2 | 5 | 9 | 10 | 3 | 23 |
| McGrory, Walt | 13 | 0 | 31 | 2.4 | 6 | 0.5 | 2 | 5 | .400 | 2 | 4 | .500 | 0 | 0 | .000 | 0 | 2 | 2 | 0.2 | 1 | 2 | 0 | 0 | 2 |
| Ballard, Michael | 9 | 0 | 17 | 1.9 | 2 | 0.2 | 0 | 4 | .000 | 0 | 3 | .000 | 2 | 2 | 1.000 | 2 | 1 | 3 | 0.3 | 0 | 0 | 0 | 0 | 2 |
| Total | 34 | - | 6924 | - | 2333 | 68.6 | 874 | 1945 | .449 | 241 | 672 | .359 | 344 | 531 | .648 | 285 | 912 | 1197 | 35.2 | 430 | 328 | 140 | 177 | 512 |
| Opponents | 34 | - | 6927 | - | 2099 | 61.7 | 774 | 1950 | .397 | 215 | 682 | .315 | 336 | 503 | .668 | 328 | 878 | 1206 | 35.5 | 352 | 386 | 138 | 176 | 591 |

Legend
| GP | Games played | GS | Games started | Avg | Average per game |
| FG | Field goals made | FGA | Field goal attempts | Off | Offensive rebounds |
| Def | Defensive rebounds | A | Assists | TO | Turnovers |
| Blk | Blocks | Stl | Steals | High | Team high |
