= Brad Davison =

American basketball player (born 1999)

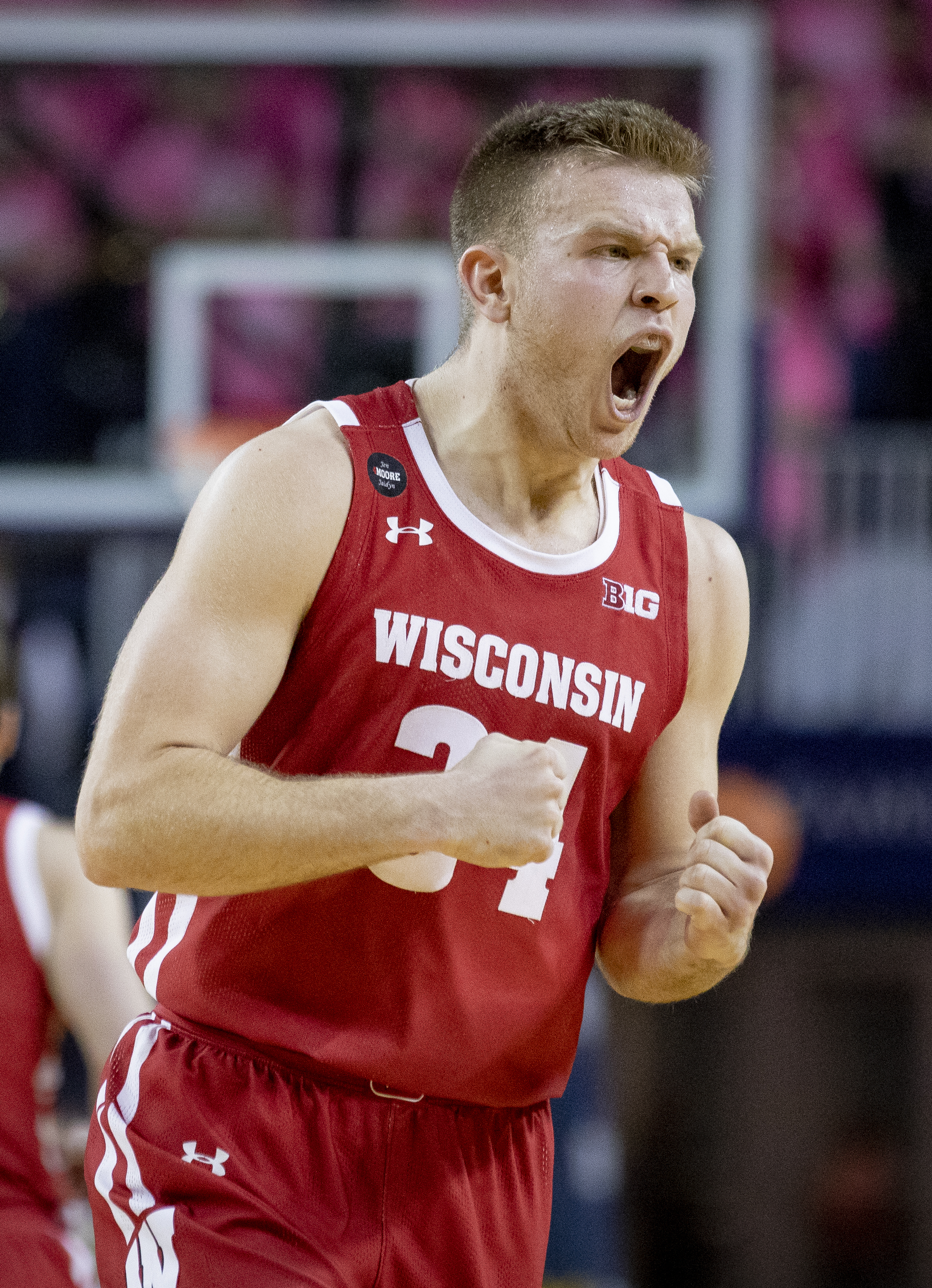
- Davison with Wisconsin in 2020

Wisconsin Badgers
- Title: Assistant coach
- League: Big Ten Conference

Personal information
- Born: April 22, 1999 (age 27) Maple Grove, Minnesota, U.S.
- Listed height: 6 ft 4 in (1.93 m)
- Listed weight: 200 lb (91 kg)

Career information
- High school: Maple Grove (Maple Grove, Minnesota)
- College: Wisconsin (2017–2022)
- NBA draft: 2022: undrafted
- Playing career: 2022–2025
- Position: Shooting guard
- Number: 34

Career history

Playing
- 2022–2023: Nevėžis Kėdainiai
- 2023–2024: HLA Alicante
- 2024–2025: Obradoiro CAB
- 2025: HLA Alicante

Coaching
- 2025–present: Wisconsin (assistant)

Career highlights
- Second-team All-Big Ten – Coaches (2022); Third-team All-Big Ten – Media (2022); Big Ten All-Freshman Team (2018)

Bradley Davison (born April 22, 1999) is an American former professional basketball player and coach. He played college basketball for the Wisconsin Badgers. Davison attended Maple Grove High School where he played basketball and football. He was named to the Big Ten All-Freshman Team after averaging 12.1 points per game. After playing professionally in Lithuania and Spain, Davison joined Wisconsin as an assistant in 2025.

== High school career ==
Davison attended Maple Grove High School and played both basketball and football. He played as a quarterback on the football field and led the Crimson to an 8–3 record as a senior. He led the West Metro South subdistrict in passing with 2,418 yards and 23 touchdowns, completing 62.9 percent of his throws. Davison finished second in the subdistrict in rushing with 891 yards and 15 scores. Davison was named 2016 Star Tribune Metro Player of the Year. He completed 43 career touchdown passes and rushed for 25 touchdowns. Throughout his career under center, Davison led Maple Grove to three state tournament appearances and a 27–7 record.

On the basketball court, Davison was a four-year starter and captain and earned All-Conference honors during all four of his years playing. He averaged 21.2 points, 6.4 rebounds, and 7.3 assists per game as a junior in leading Maple Grove to a 25–5 record and a state tournament berth. He was named to the Star Tribune All-Metro First Team as a junior. As a senior, he led the team to a 28–4 record and state tournament appearance and was a finalist for Minnesota's Mr. Basketball. Davison earned a spot on USA Today's Minnesota All-State Team after averaging 24.4 points, 7.4 rebounds, 7.9 assists and 4.2 steals per game. He finished his career at Maple Grove as the school's all-time leader in points (2,300), assists (899) and steals (365). He was ranked the No. 119 recruit in his class by Rivals and committed to playing basketball at Wisconsin on July 11, 2016, choosing the Badgers over offers from Minnesota, Michigan, Butler, Stanford and Northwestern.

== College career ==
=== Freshman season (2017–2018) ===
Davison scored 20 points on December 9, 2017, in an 82–63 loss to Marquette. On February 25, 2018, Davison scored a career-high 30 points in a 68–63 loss to Michigan State. Davison finished as Wisconsin's second-leading scorer as a freshman, averaging 12.1 points per game while shooting 81.8 percent from the free throw line and making a team-high 60 shots from the three-point range. Davison earned a spot on the Big Ten’s All-Freshman team. He sustained numerous shoulder injuries throughout the course of his freshman season, resulting in successful offseason left shoulder surgery. During his freshman season, the Wisconsin men's basketball team missed the NCAA tournament for the first time in 20 years and finished with a 15–18 record and 9th in the Big Ten Conference. The team saw their season end following a loss to the Michigan State Spartans in the Big Ten tournament on March 2, 2018.

=== Sophomore season (2018–2019) ===
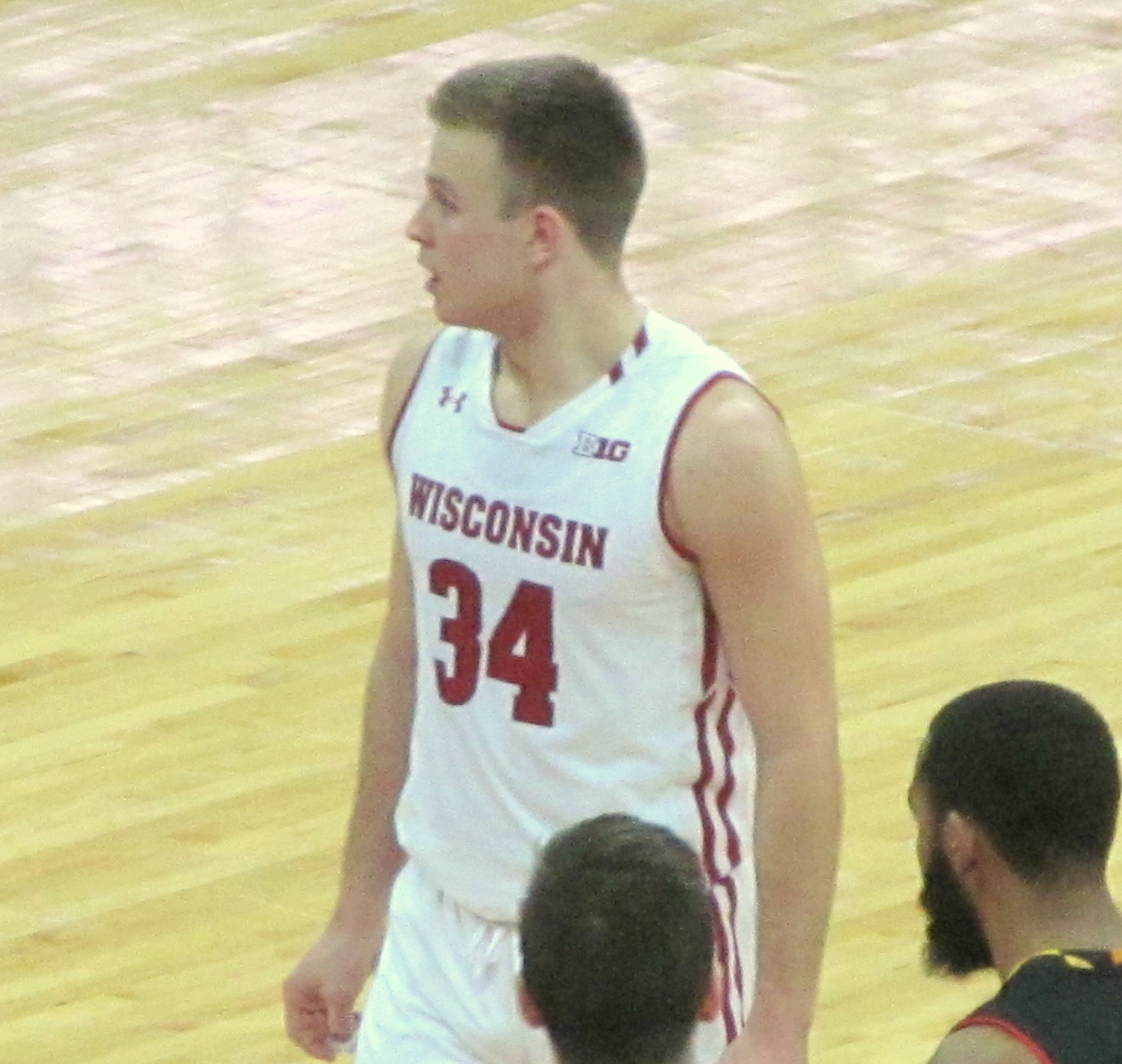
Davison in February 2019

Davison began his sophomore season in a slump, hitting 10-for-35 (28.6 percent) of his shots in his first 10 games. In a 12-game stretch in the middle of the season, Davison shot much better, hitting 29-for-53 (54.7 percent) of his three-pointers. He finished the season in a slump as well, going 13-for-61 (21.3 percent) in his final 12 games. He averaged 10.5 points per game as a sophomore, shooting 34.9 percent from beyond the arc. Davison was an Academic All-Big Ten honoree. He dealt with a foot and ankle injury throughout the season, often wearing a protective boot after games. He gained a reputation from opposing fan bases for receiving flagrant fouls and tripping players, something Wisconsin coach Greg Gard attributed to Davison playing extremely hard. Davison also received attention for excessive flopping, and the NCAA rule to combat it was informally called "the Brad Davison rule."

=== Junior season (2019–2020) ===
As a junior, Davison became the team's emotional leader with the departure of Ethan Happ. During a three-game stretch in November and December 2019, Davison shot 3-of-20 as Wisconsin lost all three games. He scored 14 points and hit the game-winning three-pointer with 9.1 seconds remaining in a 56–54 upset of Maryland on January 14, 2020. On January 29, Davison was suspended one game by the Big Ten for a flagrant foul he committed the previous game in which he struck Iowa's Connor McCaffery in the groin. On February 15, Davison tied a career-high with 30 points and his eight three-pointers tied a school record set by Bronson Koenig in an 81–64 win over Nebraska. On February 23, Davison became the 45th player in Wisconsin history to score 1,000 points during a game against Rutgers. Davison averaged 9.9 points and 4.3 rebounds per game as a junior.

=== Senior season (2020–2021) ===
Davison scored a season-high 29 points in an 85–62 win against North Carolina in the Round of 64 of the NCAA Tournament. As a senior, Davison averaged 10 points, 3.5 rebounds, and 2.4 assists per game. He announced that he would be returning for a fifth season of eligibility, taking advantage of the NCAA's decision regarding athletes who participated in the 2020–21 season.

=== Fifth season (2021–2022) ===
Coming into the 2021–22 season, Davison assumed a leadership role with the departure of several top players, although teammate Johnny Davis emerged as a national player of the year candidate. On January 27, 2022, Davison broke the Wisconsin career record for made three-pointers during a game against Nebraska, breaking Bronson Koenig's mark of 270. He finished with 21 points including five made three-pointers in a 73–65 win. Davison was named second-team All-Big Ten by the coaches and to the third team by the media. Davison averaged 14.1 points, 4.0 rebounds and 2.1 assists per game as a fifth-year senior.

== Professional career ==
On August 2, 2022, Davison signed with Nevėžis Kėdainiai of the Lithuanian Basketball League (LKL). In his first professional season, he averaged 13.7 points, 3.5 rebounds, 3.4 assists and 1.5 steals in 35 LKL games played. On August 31, 2023, Davison signed with HLA Alicante of the LEB Oro. He posted 18.5 points, 2.9 boards and 2.5 assists per game for Alicante. Davison signed with Obradoiro CAB in July 2024. In 37 games, he averaged 10.8 points and 2.9 assists per game. Davison re-joined HLA Alicante on August 1, 2025. However, he left the team after one game.

== Coaching career ==
On October 8, 2025, Davison was hired as a special assistant coach at Wisconsin, replacing Kirk Penney.

== Career statistics ==
Legend
GP	Games played	GS	Games started	MPG	Minutes per game
FG%	Field goal percentage	3P%	3-point field goal percentage	FT%	Free throw percentage
RPG	Rebounds per game	APG	Assists per game	SPG	Steals per game
BPG	Blocks per game	PPG	Points per game	**Bold**	Career high

=== College ===
Year	Team	GP	GS	MPG	FG%	3P%	FT%	RPG	APG	SPG	BPG	PPG
2017–18	Wisconsin	33	29	31.2	**.405**	.355	.818	2.3	**2.5**	**1.2**	.0	12.1
2018–19	Wisconsin	**34**	**34**	32.2	.385	.349	.809	3.3	1.8	1.1	**.1**	10.5
2019–20	Wisconsin	30	30	30.9	.395	.359	.844	**4.3**	1.9	.8	.0	9.9
2020–21	Wisconsin	31	31	31.0	.345	**.389**	**.868**	3.5	2.4	1.1	.0	10.0
2021–22	Wisconsin	33	33	**34.4**	.384	.347	.864	4.0	2.1	0.8	.0	**14.1**
Career		161	157	32.0	.383	.359	.840	3.5	2.1	1.0	.0	11.3

== Personal life ==
Davison identifies as a Christian. He has two older sisters, Stephanie and Angie, both of whom played on the Northern Iowa Panthers women's basketball team, graduating in 2016 and 2017 respectively. In high school, Davison achieved a 4.0 GPA and was named the 2017 Scholar-Athlete award from the Minnesota Chapter of the National Football Foundation. He was a member of National Honor Society in high school. Throughout his life, Davison has participated in more than 120 hours of volunteer work, going on service trips to Jamaica and Costa Rica and also at Shriners Prom. Davison was a member of Maple Grove's Fellowship of Christian Athletes and its GOLD program, which feeds impoverished peoples across the world. He majored in business management and human resources at Wisconsin.

In July 2021, Davison became engaged to Tyra Buss, an assistant coach at Milwaukee and former Indiana player. They were married on July 2, 2022 in Madison, Wisconsin. Their daughter was born on November 8, 2024.
