= Lute Olson Award =

American basketball award

- Awarded for: the nation's top player in NCAA Division I men's basketball
- Country: United States
- Presented by: Collegeinsider.com

History
- First award: 2010
- Most recent: Cameron Boozer, Duke
- Website: Official website

The Lute Olson Award is an award given annually to the most outstanding men's college basketball player in NCAA Division I competition. The award was established in 2010 and is named for former Arizona Wildcats head coach Lute Olson.

== Selection ==
From its inception through the 2020–21 season, only players who had completed at least two seasons at their current school were eligible for the award. As such, freshmen and first-year transfers were ineligible. Starting with the 2021–22 season, eligibility was extended to all Division I players regardless of their academic class or tenure at a school. The recipient is chosen by a panel of 30 people, including current and former coaches, administrators and media personnel. Lute Olson also served on the committee until his death in 2020.

== Key ==
*	Awarded a national player of the year award that same season: Sporting News; Oscar Robertson Trophy; Associated Press; NABC; Naismith; Wooden
Player (X)	Denotes the number of times the player has been awarded the Lute Olson Award at that point

== Winners ==
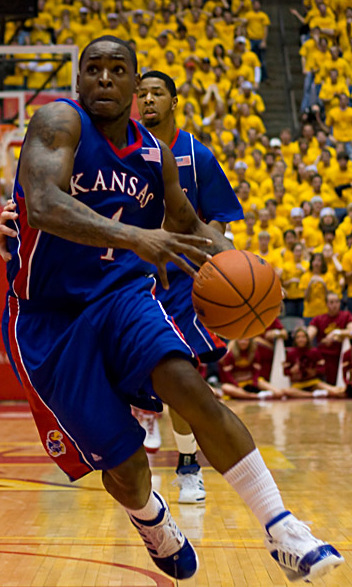
Sherron Collins, Kansas, 2010

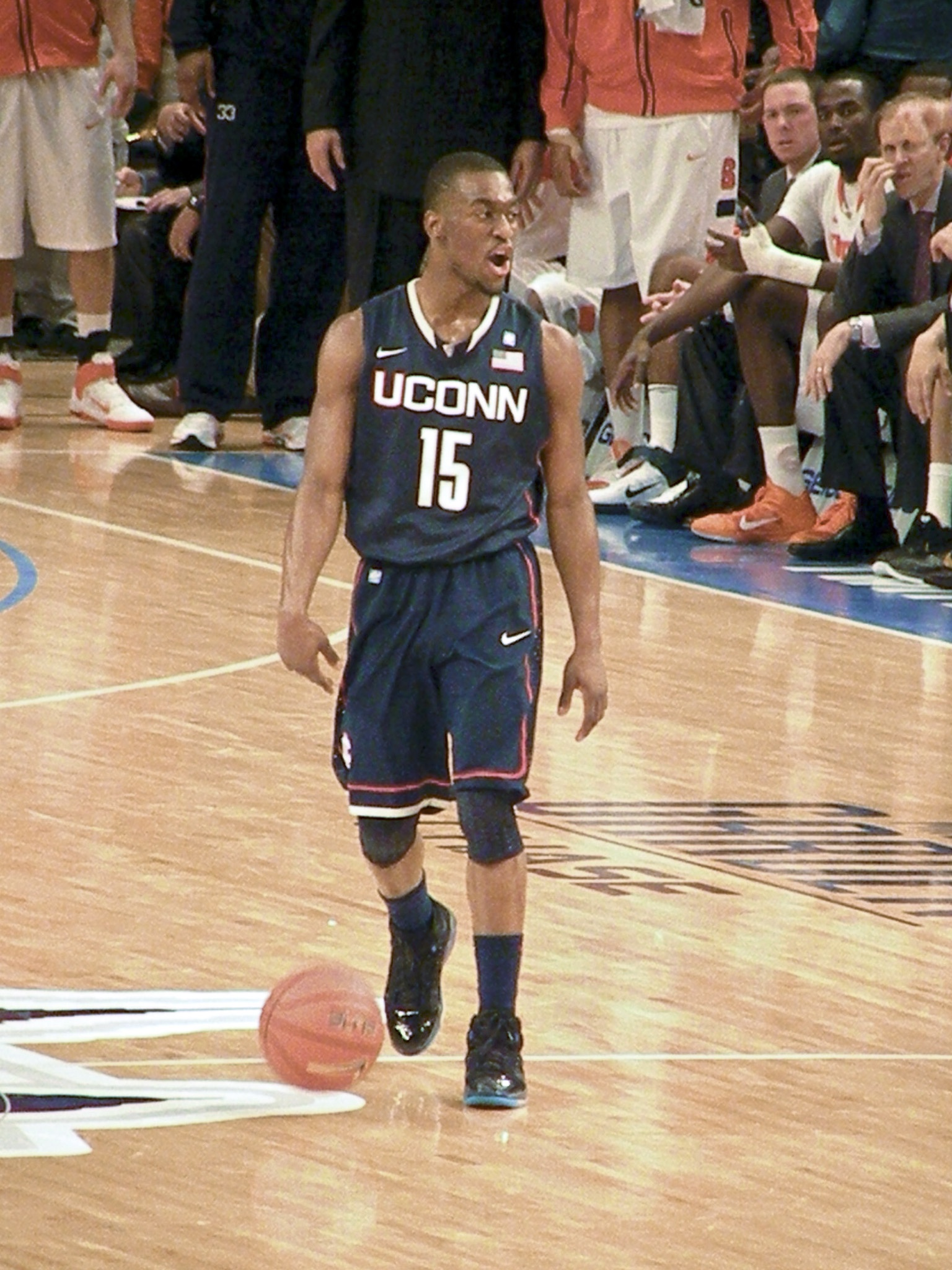
Kemba Walker, UConn, 2011

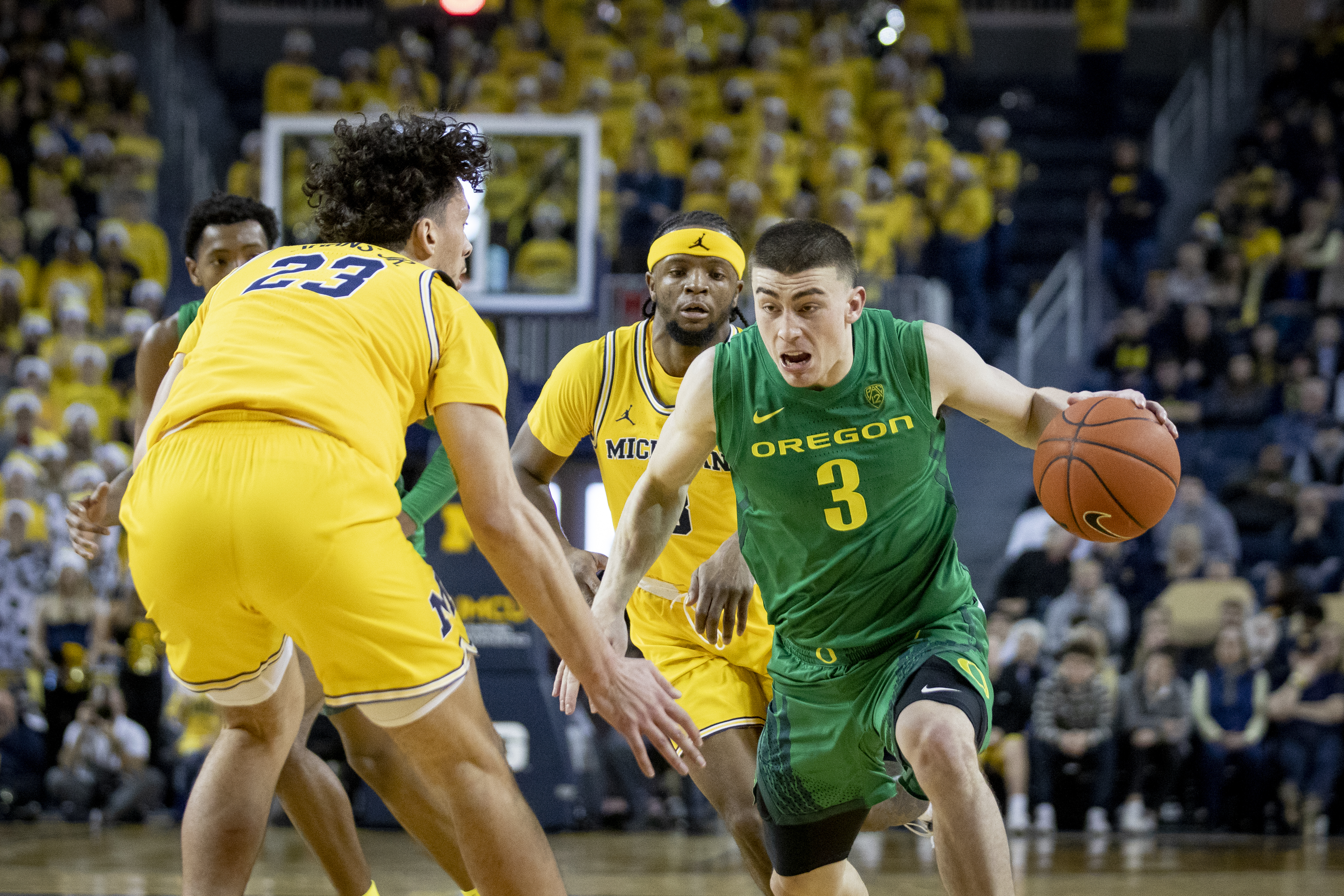
Payton Pritchard, Oregon, 2020

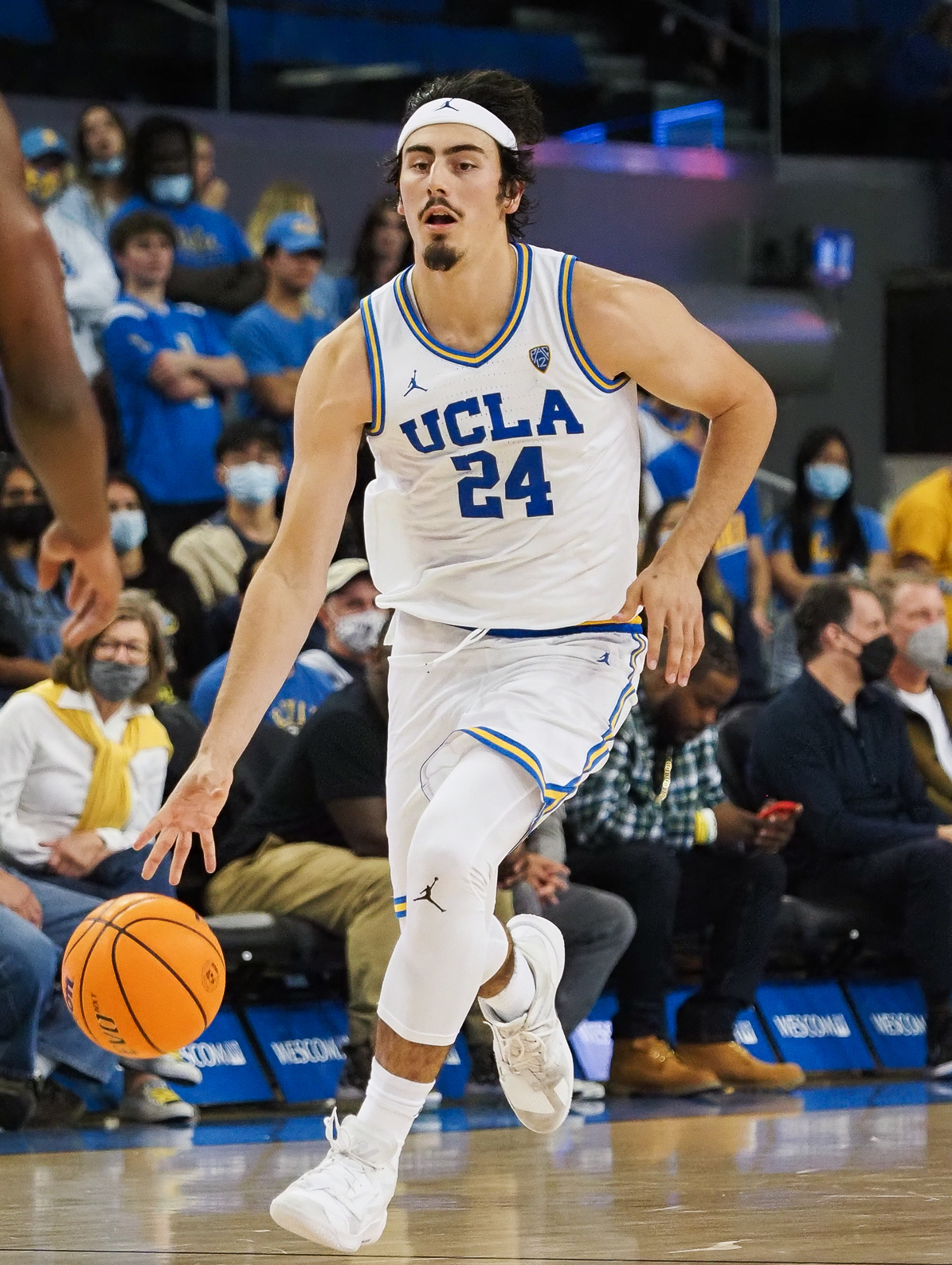
Jaime Jaquez Jr., UCLA, 2023

Year	Player	School	Position	Class	Reference
2009–10	Sherron Collins	Kansas	PG	Senior	
2010–11	Kemba Walker	UConn (Note: Then known for athletic purposes as Connecticut; UConn became the sole athletic brand in 2013.)	PG	Junior	
2011–12	Doug McDermott	Creighton	SF	Sophomore	
2012–13	Shane Larkin	Miami (Florida)	PG	Sophomore	
2013–14	Doug McDermott* (2)	Creighton	SF	Senior	
2014–15	Cameron Payne	Murray State	PG	Sophomore	
2015–16	Denzel Valentine*	Michigan State	SF	Senior	
2016–17	Caleb Swanigan	Purdue	PF	Sophomore	
2017–18	Jalen Brunson*	Villanova	PG	Junior	
2018–19	Ja Morant	Murray State	PG	Sophomore	
2019–20	Payton Pritchard	Oregon	PG	Senior	
2020–21	Luka Garza*	Iowa	C	Senior	
2021–22	Johnny Davis	Wisconsin	SG / SF	Sophomore	
2022–23	Jaime Jaquez Jr.	UCLA	SG / SF	Senior	
2023–24	Zach Edey*	Purdue	C	Senior	
2024–25	Cooper Flagg*	Duke	SG / SF	Freshman	
2025–26	Cameron Boozer*	Duke	PF	Freshman	
