= 2017–18 Wisconsin Badgers men's basketball team =

American college basketball season

2017–18 Wisconsin Badgers men's basketball
- Conference: Big Ten Conference
- Record: 15–18 (7–11 Big Ten)
- Head coach: Greg Gard (3rd season)
- Assistant coaches: Howard Moore; Joe Krabbenhoft; Dean Oliver
- Home arena: Kohl Center

2017–18 Big Ten Conference men's basketball standings
	Conf.				Overall
Team	W		L	PCT	W		L	PCT
No. 5 Michigan State	16	–	2	.889	30	–	5	.857
No. 11 Purdue	15	–	3	.833	30	–	7	.811
No. 17 Ohio State	15	–	3	.833	25	–	9	.735
No. 7 Michigan †	13	–	5	.722	33	–	8	.805
Nebraska	13	–	5	.722	22	–	11	.667
Penn State	9	–	9	.500	26	–	13	.667
Indiana	9	–	9	.500	16	–	15	.516
Maryland	8	–	10	.444	19	–	13	.594
Wisconsin	7	–	11	.389	15	–	18	.455
Northwestern	6	–	12	.333	15	–	17	.469
Minnesota	4	–	14	.222	15	–	17	.469
Illinois	4	–	14	.222	14	–	18	.438
Iowa	4	–	14	.222	14	–	19	.424
Rutgers	3	–	15	.167	15	–	19	.441
† 2018 Big Ten tournament winner Rankings from AP poll

The 2017–18 Wisconsin Badgers men's basketball team represented the University of Wisconsin–Madison in the 2017–18 NCAA Division I men's basketball season. The Badgers were led by third-year head coach Greg Gard and played their home games at the Kohl Center as members of the Big Ten Conference. They finished the season 15–18, 7–11 in Big Ten play to finish in ninth place. They defeated Maryland in the second round of the Big Ten tournament before losing to Michigan State in the quarterfinals. The Badgers failed to make the NCAA tournament for the first time since 1998, ending their streak at 19 years.

== Previous season ==
The Badgers finished the 2016–17 season 27–10, 12–6 in Big Ten play to finish in a tie for second place. They defeated Indiana and Northwestern in the Big Ten tournament, but lost to Michigan in the championship game. They received an at-large bid to the NCAA tournament, their 19th consecutive trip to the NCAA Tournament, as a No. 8 seed in the East region. The Badgers defeated Virginia Tech in the First Round and upset No. 1 overall seed Villanova to advance to the Sweet Sixteen for the fourth consecutive year. In the Sweet Sixteen, they lost to 20th-ranked Florida.

== Offseason ==
=== Departures ===
Name	Number	Pos.	Height	Weight	Year	Hometown	Notes
Zak Showalter	3	G	6'3"	185	RS Senior	Germantown, WI	Graduated
Nigel Hayes	10	F	6'8"	240	Senior	Toledo, OH	Graduated
Jordan Hill	11	G	6'4"	172	RS Junior	Pasadena, CA	Graduated; transferred to Seattle
Bronson Koenig	24	G	6'4"	190	Senior	La Crosse, WI	Graduated
Vitto Brown	30	F	6'8"	235	Senior	Bowling Green, OH	Graduated

=== Recruiting classes ===
==== 2017 recruiting class ====
College recruiting information
Name	Hometown	School	Height	Weight	Commit date
Kobe King; PG	La Crosse, WI	La Crosse Central High School	6 ft 2 in (1.88 m)	160 lb (73 kg)	Sep 16, 2015
Kobe King; PG	Recruit ratings: Scout: Rivals: 247Sports: (81)				
Nate Reuvers; PF	Lakeville, MN	Lakeville North High School	6 ft 10 in (2.08 m)	220 lb (100 kg)	May 18, 2016
Nate Reuvers; PF	Recruit ratings: Scout: Rivals: 247Sports: (83)				
Brad Davison; PG	Osseo, MN	Maple Grove High School	6 ft 3 in (1.91 m)	190 lb (86 kg)	Jul 11, 2016
Brad Davison; PG	Recruit ratings: Scout: Rivals: 247Sports: (81)				
Overall recruit ranking:
Note: In many cases, Scout, Rivals, 247Sports, On3, and ESPN may conflict in their listings of height and weight.; In these cases, the average was taken. ESPN grades are on a 100-point scale.; Sources: "2017 Wisconsin Commitments". Rivals.; "Men's Basketball Recruiting". Scout.; "ESPN- Wisconsin Badgers Men's Basketball Recruiting". ESPN.; "Scout.com Team Recruiting Rankings". Scout.; "2017 Team Ranking". Rivals.

==== 2018 recruiting class ====
College recruiting information (2018)
Name	Hometown	School	Height	Weight	Commit date
Joe Hedstrom; C	Minnetonka, MN	Hopkins High School	6 ft 10 in (2.08 m)	200 lb (91 kg)	Oct 11, 2017
Joe Hedstrom; C	Recruit ratings: Scout: Rivals: 247Sports: (N/A)				
Taylor Currie; PF	Clarkston, MI	Clarkston High School	6 ft 8 in (2.03 m)	200 lb (91 kg)	Oct 31, 2017
Taylor Currie; PF	Recruit ratings: Scout: Rivals: 247Sports: (N/A)				
Tai Strickland; PG	Tampa, FL	St. Petersburg High School	6 ft 2 in (1.88 m)	180 lb (82 kg)	Mar 27, 2018
Tai Strickland; PG	Recruit ratings: Scout: Rivals: 247Sports: (79)				
Overall recruit ranking: Scout: NR Rivals: NR ESPN: NR
Note: In many cases, Scout, Rivals, 247Sports, On3, and ESPN may conflict in their listings of height and weight.; In these cases, the average was taken. ESPN grades are on a 100-point scale.; Sources:

=== New Zealand/Australia trip ===
The Badgers undertook trip to New Zealand and Australia where they played five games against New Zealand and Australia professional teams. The 12-day trip began August 12, 2017 and helped determine the roster as the Badgers look to replace four departing seniors from last year. The Badgers won four of the five games they played on the trip. A different player led Wisconsin in scoring in each of the games and none of them was first-team All-Big Ten forward Ethan Happ, who did average 12.0 points, 6.4 rebounds, 3.4 assists and 2.4 steals. Coach Greg Gard was impressed by the balanced scoring of his team on the trip.

== Preseason ==
Wisconsin junior forward Ethan Happ was selected as a first team All-American by the Blue Ribbon Yearbook in its annual preseason publication.

== Roster ==
2017–18 Wisconsin Badgers men's basketball team
Players
Coaches

Pos.	#	Name	Height	Weight	Year	Previous school	Hometown
G	0	D'Mitrik Trice (injured) (redshirt)	6 ft 0 in (1.83 m)	177 lb (80 kg)	So	Wayne High School (OH)	Huber Heights, Ohio
G	1	Brevin Pritzl	6 ft 3 in (1.91 m)	197 lb (89 kg)	RS So	De Pere High School	De Pere, Wisconsin
F	2	Aleem Ford	6 ft 8 in (2.03 m)	215 lb (98 kg)	RS Fr	Archer High School	Lawrenceville, Georgia
G	3	Walt McGrory (W)	6 ft 3 in (1.91 m)	210 lb (95 kg)	Fr	Edina High School	Edina, Minnesota
G	4	Matt Ferris (W)	6 ft 6 in (1.98 m)	205 lb (93 kg)	RS Jr	Xavier High School (WI)	Appleton, Wisconsin
F	5	Aaron Moesch	6 ft 8 in (2.03 m)	220 lb (100 kg)	RS Sr	Green Bay Southwest High School	Green Bay, Wisconsin
F	11	Andy Van Vliet	7 ft 0 in (2.13 m)	228 lb (103 kg)	Jr	Antwerp Giants	Antwerp, Belgium
G	12	Trevor Anderson (W) (redshirt)	6 ft 2 in (1.88 m)	196 lb (89 kg)	So	Stevens Point H.S./UW-Green Bay	Stevens Point, Wisconsin
F	15	Charles Thomas IV	6 ft 8 in (2.03 m)	255 lb (116 kg)	Jr	River Hill High School	Highland, Maryland
G	20	T. J. Schlundt (W)	6 ft 5 in (1.96 m)	197 lb (89 kg)	RS Jr	St. John's Northwestern Military Academy	Oconomowoc, Wisconsin
G/F	21	Khalil Iverson	6 ft 5 in (1.96 m)	210 lb (95 kg)	Jr	Rutherford B. Hayes High School (OH)	Delaware, Ohio
F	22	Ethan Happ	6 ft 10 in (2.08 m)	235 lb (107 kg)	RS Jr	Rockridge High School	Milan, Illinois
G	23	Kobe King (injured) (redshirt)	6 ft 4 in (1.93 m)	203 lb (92 kg)	Fr	La Crosse Central High School	La Crosse, Wisconsin
F	25	Alex Illikainen	6 ft 9 in (2.06 m)	231 lb (105 kg)	Jr	Brewster Academy	Grand Rapids, Minnesota
G	31	Michael Ballard (W)	6 ft 4 in (1.93 m)	197 lb (89 kg)	RS Fr	Fenwick High School (IL)	Oak Park, Illinois
G	34	Brad Davison	6 ft 3 in (1.91 m)	205 lb (93 kg)	Fr	Maple Grove High School	Maple Grove, Minnesota
F	35	Nate Reuvers	6 ft 10 in (2.08 m)	215 lb (98 kg)	Fr	Lakeville North High School	Lakeville, Minnesota

Head coach

- Greg Gard (UW-Platteville)

Assistant coach(es)

- Howard Moore (Wisconsin)
- Joe Krabbenhoft (Wisconsin)
- Dean Oliver (Iowa)

Legend

- (C) Team captain
- (S) Suspended
- (I) Ineligible
- (W) Walk-on
- Injured
- Current redshirt

Roster

== Schedule and results ==
Date time, TV	Rank^{#}	Opponent^{#}	Result	Record	High points	High rebounds	High assists	Site (attendance) city, state
Australia/New Zealand exhibition trip
Aug 15, 2017*; 3:00 am		at New Zealand Breakers (NBL)	W 85–75	–	28 – Pritzl	11 – Happ	3 – Tied	Sky City Breakers Complex; Auckland, New Zealand
Aug 17, 2017*; 1:30 am		vs. New Zealand Breakers (NBL)	W 87–53	–	14 – Van Vliet	7 – Van Vliet	5 – Anderson	Queen Elizabeth Youth Centre; Tauranga, New Zealand
Aug 19, 2017*; 1:00 am		vs. Hawthorn Magic (Big V)	W 75–68	–	18 – King	7 – Van Vliet	3 – Reuvers	Trinity Grammar School (1,000); Melbourne, Australia
Aug 20, 2017*; 12:00 am		vs. Melbourne United (NBL)	L 89–90	–	19 – Trice	5 – Trice	4 – Trice	Casey Basketball Stadium; Casey, Melbourne, Australia
Aug 22, 2017*; 5:30 am		vs. Sydney Kings (NBL)	W 83–71	–	23 – Davison	9 – Happ	7 – Happ	Bankstown Basketball Stadium (612); Sydney, Australia
Exhibition
Nov 1, 2017*; 7:00 pm, BTN+		Northern Iowa; Team Rubicon benefit exhibition	W 69–38	–	15 – King	7 – Happ	2 – 4 tied	Kohl Center (17,287); Madison, WI
Nov 5, 2017*; 4:00 pm, BTN+		UW Stout	W 85–56	–	17 – King	7 – 2 tied	3 – 2 tied	Kohl Center (17,287); Madison, WI
Regular season
Nov 10, 2017*; 6:00 pm, BTN+		South Carolina State; CBE Hall of Fame Classic	W 85–50	1–0	20 – Happ	11 – Happ	5 – Trice	Kohl Center (17,287); Madison, WI
Nov 12, 2017*; 5:00 pm, BTN		Yale; CBE Hall of Fame Classic	W 89–61	2–0	17 – Iverson	11 – Happ	3 – Iverson	Kohl Center (17,287); Madison, WI
Nov 16, 2017*; 7:30 pm, FS1		No. 15 Xavier; Gavitt Tipoff Games	L 70–80	2–1	21 – Happ	6 – Iverson	8 – Happ	Kohl Center (17,287); Madison, WI
Nov 20, 2017*; 8:30 pm, ESPN2		vs. No. 22 Baylor; CBE Hall of Fame Classic Semifinals	L 65–70	2–2	23 – Happ	13 – Happ	5 – Iverson	Sprint Center (10,234); Kansas City, MO
Nov 21, 2017*; 6:30 pm, ESPN3		vs. No. 23 UCLA; CBE Hall of Fame Classic consolation	L 70–72	2–3	19 – Happ	9 – Happ	5 – Happ	Sprint Center (10,160); Kansas City, MO
Nov 24, 2017*; 8:00 pm, BTN		Milwaukee	W 71–49	3–3	19 – Davison	8 – Happ	5 – Ford	Kohl Center (17,287); Madison, WI
Nov 27, 2017*; 8:00 pm, ESPN2		at No. 18 Virginia; ACC–Big Ten Challenge	L 37–49	3–4	14 – Happ	8 – Happ	2 – Trice	John Paul Jones Arena (13,911); Charlottesville, VA
Dec 2, 2017; 4:00 pm, FOX		Ohio State	L 58–83	3–5 (0–1)	16 – Davison	6 – Happ	3 – Davison	Kohl Center (17,287); Madison, WI
Dec 4, 2017; 6:00 pm, ESPN2		at Penn State	W 64–63	4–5 (1–1)	16 – Iverson	10 – Happ	3 – Tied	Bryce Jordan Center (6,730); University Park, PA
Dec 6, 2017*; 8:00 pm, ESPNU		at Temple	L 55–59	4–6	23 – Happ	6 – Happ/Iverson	4 – Trice	Liacouras Center (6,713); Philadelphia, PA
Dec 9, 2017*; 11:00 am, FS1		Marquette; Rivalry	L 63–82	4–7	20 – Davison	9 – Happ	4 – Tied	Kohl Center (17,287); Madison, WI
Dec 13, 2017*; 7:00 pm, FS1		Western Kentucky	W 81–80	5–7	17 – Tied	5 – Ford	6 – Happ	Kohl Center (17,287); Madison, WI
Dec 23, 2017*; 4:30 pm, BTN		Green Bay	W 81–60	6–7	18 – Davison	8 – Happ	4 – Pritzl	Kohl Center (17,287); Madison, WI
Dec 27, 2017*; 8:00 pm, ESPNU		Chicago State	W 82–70	7–7	18 – Happ	12 – Happ	6 – Happ	Kohl Center (17,287); Madison, WI
Dec 30, 2017*; 3:00 pm, BTN		UMass Lowell	W 82–53	8–7	18 – Tied	7 – Tied	6 – Davison	Kohl Center (17,287); Madison, WI
Jan 2, 2018; 6:00 pm, ESPN		Indiana	W 71–61	9–7 (2–1)	28 – Happ	10 – Happ	4 – Happ	Kohl Center (17,287); Madison, WI
Jan 5, 2018; 6:00 pm, ESPN2		at Rutgers	L 60–64	9–8 (2–2)	13 – Tied	10 – Happ	5 – Davison	Louis Brown Athletic Center (5,709); Piscataway, NJ
Jan 9, 2018; 7:30 pm, BTN		at Nebraska	L 59–63	9–9 (2–3)	15 – Happ	11 – Happ	5 – Davison	Pinnacle Bank Arena (13,497); Lincoln, NE
Jan 16, 2018; 6:00 pm, ESPN		at No. 3 Purdue	L 50–78	9–10 (2–4)	15 – Happ	7 – Iverson	7 – Happ	Mackey Arena (14,804); West Lafayette, IN
Jan 19, 2018; 8:00 pm, FS1		Illinois	W 75–50	10–10 (3–4)	18 – Davison	10 – Happ	5 – Happ	Kohl Center (17,287); Madison, WI
Jan 23, 2018; 6:00 pm, ESPN2		at Iowa	L 67–85	10–11 (3–5)	21 – Happ	10 – Happ	5 – Happ	Carver–Hawkeye Arena (11,563); Iowa City, IA
Jan 26, 2018; 7:00 pm, FS1		at No. 6 Michigan State	L 61–76	10–12 (3–6)	23 – Happ	7 – Happ	4 – Tied	Breslin Center (14,797); East Lansing, MI
Jan 29, 2018; 8:00 pm, BTN		Nebraska	L 63–74	10–13 (3–7)	25 – Happ	11 – Happ	6 – Happ	Kohl Center (17,287); Madison, WI
Feb 1, 2018; 7:30 pm, FS1		Northwestern	L 52–60	10–14 (3–8)	15 – Iverson	9 – Iverson	4 – Happ	Kohl Center (17,287); Madison, WI
Feb 4, 2018; 12:00 pm, CBS		at Maryland	L 63–68	10–15 (3–9)	18 – Happ	9 – Happ	3 – Happ	Xfinity Center (15,810); College Park, MD
Feb 8, 2018; 8:00 pm, BTN		at Illinois	W 78–69	11–15 (4–9)	27 – Happ	9 – Iverson	8 – Happ	State Farm Center (13,062); Champaign, IL
Feb 11, 2018; 12:00 pm, CBS		No. 20 Michigan	L 72–83	11–16 (4–10)	29 – Happ	7 – Happ	7 – Iverson	Kohl Center (17,287); Madison, WI
Feb 15, 2018; 6:00 pm, ESPN		No. 6 Purdue	W 57–53	12–16 (5–10)	21 – Happ	12 – Happ	3 – Pritzl	Kohl Center (17,287); Madison, WI
Feb 19, 2018; 8:00 pm, FS1		Minnesota	W 73–63 ^{OT}	13–16 (6–10)	20 – Pritzl	12 – Iverson	5 – Happ	Kohl Center (17,287); Madison, WI
Feb 22, 2018; 6:00 pm, ESPN2		at Northwestern	W 70–64	14–16 (7–10)	19 – Happ	7 – Happ	6 – Davison	Allstate Arena (7,033); Rosemont, IL
Feb 25, 2018; 12:00 pm, CBS		No. 2 Michigan State	L 63–68	14–17 (7–11)	30 – Davison	9 – Pritzl	2 – 2 tied	Kohl Center (17,287); Madison, WI
Big Ten tournament
Mar 1, 2018; 11:00 am, BTN	(9)	vs. (8) Maryland; Second round	W 59–54	15–17	14 – Happ	7 – Happ	2 – Davison	Madison Square Garden; New York City, NY
Mar 2, 2018; 11:00 am, BTN	(9)	vs. (1) No. 2 Michigan State; Quarterfinals	L 60–63	15–18	22 – Happ	5 – Iverson	5 – Davison	Madison Square Garden; New York City, NY
*Non-conference game. ^{#}Rankings from AP Poll. (#) Tournament seedings in parentheses. All times are in Central Time.

== Player statistics ==
Updated through February 16, 2018

Individual player statistics
			Minutes		Scoring		Total FGs			3-point FGs			Free-Throws			Rebounds							
Player	GP	GS	Tot	Avg	Pts	Avg	FG	FGA	Pct	3FG	3FA	Pct	FT	FTA	Pct	Off	Def	Tot	Avg	A	TO	Blk	Stl
Ballard, Michael	1	0	1	1.0	0	0.0	0	0	.000	0	0	.000	0	0	.000	0	0	0	0.0	0	0	0	0
Davison, Brad	28	24	854	30.5	321	11.5	98	244	.402	49	138	.355	76	94	.809	6	54	60	2.1	66	55	1	35
Ferris, Matt	6	0	8	1.3	2	0.3	1	1	1.000	0	0	.000	0	0	.000	1	2	3	0.5	0	2	0	0
Ford, Aleem	28	17	660	23.6	162	5.8	52	122	.426	39	87	.448	19	24	.792	16	64	80	2.9	22	23	4	6
Happ, Ethan	28	28	851	30.4	512	18.3	211	395	.534	1	11	.091	89	161	.553	69	168	237	8.5	108	81	26	39
Illikainen, Alex	21	0	155	7.4	17	0.8	6	15	.400	5	10	.500	0	3	.000	9	13	22	1.0	10	4	3	0
Iverson, Khalil	28	28	826	29.5	239	8.5	90	168	.536	0	23	.000	59	85	.694	46	91	137	4.9	52	59	28	23
King, Kobe	10	0	190	19.0	52	5.2	21	46	.457	7	21	.333	3	3	1.000	8	6	14	1.4	6	3	2	2
McGrory, Walt	9	0	72	8.0	5	0.6	0	5	.000	0	3	.000	5	7	.714	0	8	8	0.9	4	7	0	4
Moesch, Aaron	22	0	144	6.5	26	1.2	7	9	.778	2	2	1.000	10	11	.909	3	10	13	0.6	7	5	0	3
Pritzl, Brevin	27	17	750	27.8	235	8.7	77	195	.395	40	121	.331	41	49	.837	26	73	99	3.7	31	16	4	20
Reuvers, Nate	23	12	382	16.6	130	5.7	50	125	.400	12	38	.316	18	20	.900	17	33	50	2.2	16	25	23	5
Schlundt, T.J.	22	0	189	8.6	22	1.0	8	36	.222	6	27	.222	0	0	.000	6	9	15	0.7	6	3	2	4
Thomas IV, Charlie	19	0	109	5.7	20	1.1	9	23	.391	0	6	.000	2	5	.400	9	21	31	1.6	4	4	1	0
Trice, D'Mitrik	10	10	315	31.5	94	9.4	35	92	.380	12	40	.300	12	17	.706	2	18	20	2.0	23	13	1	6
Van Vliet, Andy	13	4	94	7.2	44	3.4	13	28	.464	8	15	.533	10	14	.714	4	16	20	1.5	1	3	3	1
Team																							
Total	28		5600		1881	67.2	678	1504	.451	181	542	.334	344	493	.698	252	619	871	31.1	356	316	98	148
Opponents	28		5600		1865	66.6	681	1476	.461	160	449	.356	343	463	.741	216	635	851	30.4	328	322	103	157

Legend
GP	Games played	GS	Games started	Avg	Average per game
FG	Field-goals made	FGA	Field-goal attempts	Off	Offensive rebounds
Def	Defensive rebounds	A	Assists	TO	Turnovers
Blk	Blocks	Stl	Steals	High	Team high
