= Howard Moore (basketball) =

American basketball coach

Biographical details
- Born: 1972 (age 53–54); Chicago, Illinois, U.S.
- Education: University Of Wisconsin

Playing career
- 1990–95: Wisconsin
- Position: Forward

Coaching career (HC unless noted)
- 1998–1999: Chicago (asst.)
- 2000–2003: Bradley (asst.)
- 2003–2004: Ball State (asst.)
- 2004–2005: Loyola (Chicago) (asst.)
- 2005–2010: Wisconsin (asst.)
- 2010–2015: UIC
- 2015–2019: Wisconsin (asst.)

Head coaching record
- Overall: 49–111 (.306)

Howard Moore is a former American college basketball coach and the former head men's basketball coach at University of Illinois at Chicago. Moore replaced Jimmy Collins as head coach of the Flames on August 23, 2010. Moore most recently served as an assistant on head coach Greg Gard's staff at Wisconsin.

Moore played at Taft High School in the Chicago Public League and graduated from the University of Wisconsin. He began his coaching career with assisting the head boys basketball coach at Taft High School before coaching alongside Stewart (Stew) Robinson as his assistant head coach at UIC.

On the morning of Saturday, May 25, 2019, two members of his family were killed as the result of a collision with a vehicle that was being driven the wrong way. Moore's daughter, Jaidyn, died at the scene and his wife, Jennifer, died in a hospital. Assistant Coach Moore received serious injuries and was hospitalized, and his son, Jerell, received minor injuries. The driver of the vehicle going the wrong way was pronounced dead at the scene. Due to serious health concerns in the aftermath of the accident, Moore did not coach during the 2019–2020 nor in the 2020–21 season.

== Head coaching record ==
Record table
Season	Team	Overall	Conference	Standing	Postseason
UIC Flames (Horizon League) (2010–2015)
2010–11	UIC	7–24	2–16	10th	
2011–12	UIC	8–22	3–15	9th	
2012–13	UIC	18–16	7–9	5th	CIT Second Round
2013–14	UIC	6–25	1–15	9th	
2014–15	UIC	10–24	4–12	7th	
UIC:		49–111 (.306)	17–67 (.202)		
Total:		49–111 (.306)			
National champion Postseason invitational champion Conference regular season champion Conference regular season and conference tournament champion Division regular season champion Division regular season and conference tournament champion Conference tournament champion
