= Johnny Davis (basketball, born 2002) =

American basketball player (born 2002)

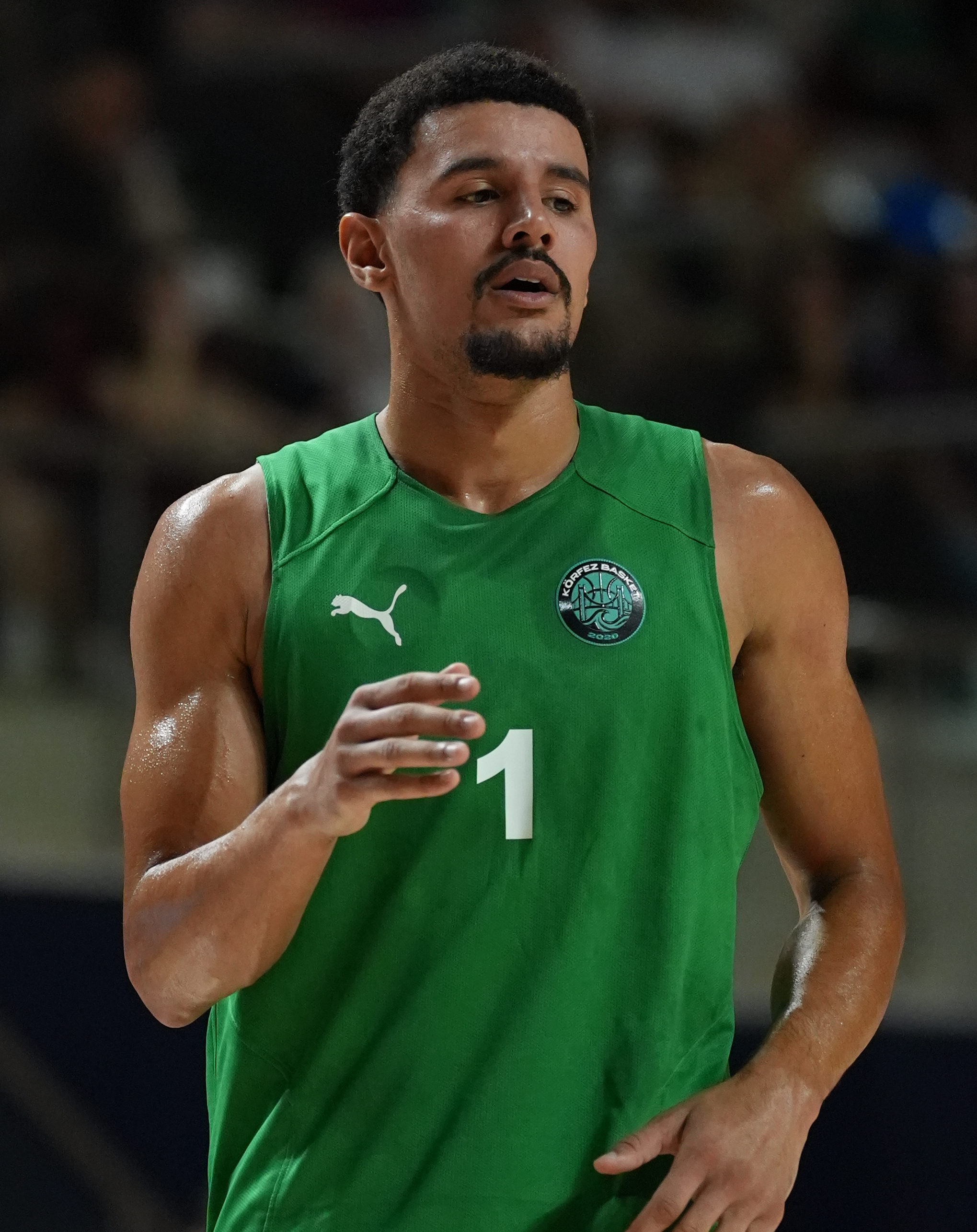
- Davis with the Körfez Basket in 2026

No. 1 – Biotekno Körfez Basket
- Position: Shooting guard
- League: Basketbol Süper Ligi

Personal information
- Born: February 27, 2002 (age 24) La Crosse, Wisconsin, U.S.
- Listed height: 6 ft 4 in (1.93 m)
- Listed weight: 195 lb (88 kg)

Career information
- High school: La Crosse Central (La Crosse, Wisconsin)
- College: Wisconsin (2020–2022)
- NBA draft: 2022: 1st round, 10th overall pick
- Drafted by: Washington Wizards
- Playing career: 2022–present

Career history
- 2022–2025: Washington Wizards
- 2022–2023; 2024: →Capital City Go-Go
- 2025: Westchester Knicks
- 2025–2026: Wisconsin Herd
- 2026–present: Körfez Basket

Career highlights
- Consensus first-team All-American (2022); Lute Olson Award (2022); Jerry West Award (2022); Big Ten Player of the Year (2022); First-team All-Big Ten (2022); Wisconsin Mr. Basketball (2020)
- Stats at NBA.com
- Stats at Basketball Reference
Medals
Men's basketball
Representing the United States
FIBA Under-19 World Cup
| Gold medal – first place | 2021 Latvia | Team |

Jonathan Christian Davis (born February 27, 2002) is an American professional basketball player for Körfez Basket of the Basketbol Süper Ligi (BSL). He played college basketball for the Wisconsin Badgers.

== Early life ==
Davis is the son of former NBA player Mark Davis. He played basketball for La Crosse Central High School in La Crosse, Wisconsin. He helped the school win a Division 2 state title as a freshman. In his junior season, Davis averaged 23 points and 9 rebounds per game, earning La Crosse Tribune Player of the Year honors. As a senior, he averaged 27.4 points and 9.2 rebounds per game. He was named Wisconsin Mr. Basketball and repeated as La Crosse Tribune Player of the Year. Davis left as his school's all-time leading scorer with 2,158 career points. He committed to playing college basketball for Wisconsin over offers from Marquette, Iowa and Minnesota, among others.

Davis also played football for La Crosse Central as a quarterback. In his senior season, he earned Large Schools First Team All-State honors and won the Dave Krieg Award as the most outstanding senior quarterback in Wisconsin.

== College career ==
On February 2, 2021, Davis scored a freshman season-high 17 points, shooting 6-of-7 from the field, in a 72–56 win over Penn State. As a freshman, he came off the bench, averaging seven points and 4.1 rebounds per game while leading his team with 34 steals. On November 23, 2021, Davis scored 30 points in a 65–63 upset of Houston. He scored a career-high 37 points and had 14 rebounds on January 3, 2022, in a 74–69 upset of Purdue. As a sophomore, he averaged 19.7 points and 8.2 rebounds per game. Davis was named Big Ten Player of the Year. On March 31, 2022, Davis declared for the 2022 NBA draft, forgoing his remaining college eligibility.

== Professional career ==
=== Washington Wizards (2022–2025) ===
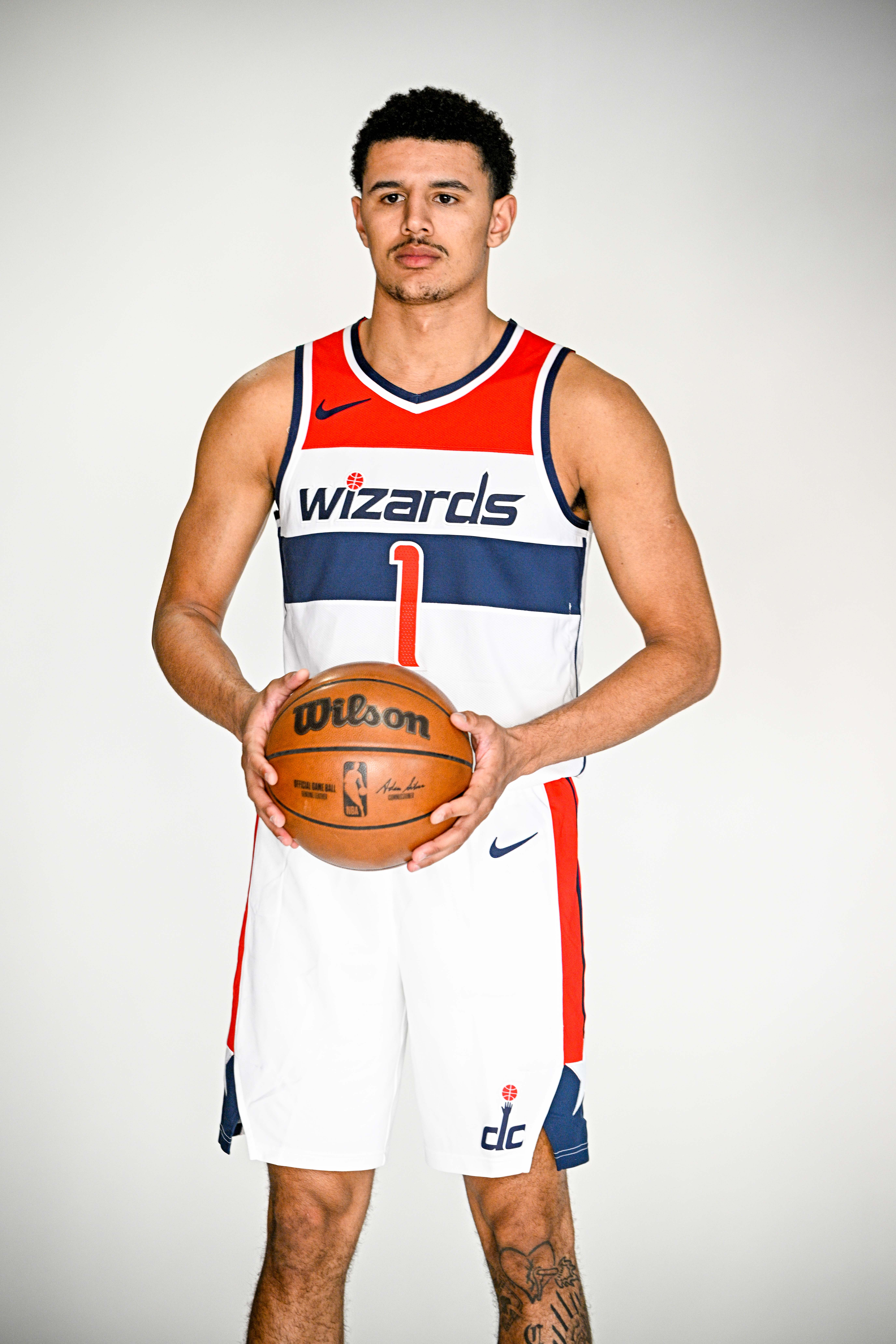
Davis at the Washington Wizards media day in 2022

Davis was selected with the tenth overall pick by the Washington Wizards in the 2022 NBA draft. Davis joined the Wizards' 2022 NBA Summer League roster. In his Summer League debut, Davis scored six points on 1-for-11 shooting in a 99–105 loss to the Detroit Pistons.

On February 6, 2025, Davis was traded to the Memphis Grizzlies along with Marvin Bagley III in a three-team deal involving Marcus Smart, but was waived on February 21, 2025, without appearing in a game for the Grizzlies.

=== Westchester Knicks (2025) ===
On March 1, 2025, Davis signed with the Westchester Knicks of the NBA G League.

=== Wisconsin Herd (2025–2026) ===
On October 8, 2025, the Wisconsin Herd acquired Davis' player rights from the Westchester Knicks. In exchange, the Herd sent the rights to Diego Bernard and Jalen Lewis, along with a pick in the 2026 NBA G League Player Draft and International Draft to Westchester.

=== Körfez Basket (2026–present) ===
On June 19, 2026, Davis signed with Körfez Basket of the Basketbol Süper Ligi (BSL).

== National team career ==
Davis represented the United States at the 2021 FIBA Under-19 World Cup in Latvia. He averaged 4.1 points per game, helping his team win the gold medal.

== Career statistics ==
Legend
| GP | Games played | GS | Games started | MPG | Minutes per game |
| FG% | Field goal percentage | 3P% | 3-point field goal percentage | FT% | Free throw percentage |
| RPG | Rebounds per game | APG | Assists per game | SPG | Steals per game |
| BPG | Blocks per game | PPG | Points per game | **Bold** | Career high |

=== NBA ===
==== Regular season ====
| Year | Team | GP | GS | MPG | FG% | 3P% | FT% | RPG | APG | SPG | BPG | PPG |
|---|---|---|---|---|---|---|---|---|---|---|---|---|
| 2022–23 | Washington | 28 | 5 | **15.1** | .386 | .243 | .519 | **2.3** | **1.0** | **.4** | **.3** | **5.8** |
| 2023–24 | Washington | **50** | **6** | 12.3 | .403 | **.350** | .583 | 1.4 | .6 | **.4** | .2 | 3.0 |
| 2024–25 | Washington | 34 | 0 | 7.1 | **.410** | .241 | **.600** | 1.1 | .3 | **.4** | .2 | 2.4 |
| Career | | 112 | 11 | 11.4 | .397 | .273 | .561 | 1.6 | .6 | .4 | .2 | 3.5 |

=== College ===
| Year | Team | GP | GS | MPG | FG% | 3P% | FT% | RPG | APG | SPG | BPG | PPG |
|---|---|---|---|---|---|---|---|---|---|---|---|---|
| 2020–21 | Wisconsin | **31** | 0 | 24.3 | **.441** | **.389** | .727 | 4.1 | 1.1 | 1.1 | .6 | 7.0 |
| 2021–22 | Wisconsin | **31** | **31** | **34.2** | .427 | .306 | **.791** | **8.2** | **2.1** | **1.2** | **.7** | **19.7** |
| Career | | 62 | 31 | 29.2 | .431 | .325 | .779 | 6.2 | 1.6 | 1.1 | .7 | 13.4 |

== Personal life ==
Davis' father, Mark, played professional basketball for 13 seasons, including stints in the NBA, following a college career at Old Dominion. His twin brother, Jordan, who was his basketball and football teammate in high school, originally played college basketball for Wisconsin before transferring to Illinois State. Prior to the draft, Davis appeared in a Taco Bell commercial promoting the chain's Toasted Cheddar Chalupa.

== See also ==
- List of second-generation NBA players
