= 2021–22 Wisconsin Badgers men's basketball team =

American college basketball season

2021–22 Wisconsin Badgers men's basketball

Big Ten regular season co-champions Maui Invitational champions

NCAA tournament, Second Round
- Conference: Big Ten Conference

Ranking
- Coaches: No. 18
- AP: No. 14
- Record: 25–8 (15–5 Big Ten)
- Head coach: Greg Gard (7th season)
- Assistant coaches: Joe Krabbenhoft; Dean Oliver; Sharif Chambliss
- Home arena: Kohl Center

2021–22 Big Ten Conference men's basketball standings
	Conf.				Overall
Team	W		L	PCT	W		L	PCT
No. 19 Illinois	15	–	5	.750	23	–	10	.697
No. 14 Wisconsin	15	–	5	.750	25	–	8	.758
No. 10 Purdue	14	–	6	.700	29	–	8	.784
Rutgers	12	–	8	.600	18	–	14	.563
No. 16 Iowa †	12	–	8	.600	26	–	10	.722
Ohio State	12	–	8	.600	20	–	12	.625
Michigan State	11	–	9	.550	23	–	13	.639
Michigan	11	–	9	.550	19	–	15	.559
Indiana	9	–	11	.450	21	–	14	.600
Maryland	7	–	13	.350	15	–	17	.469
Penn State	7	–	13	.350	14	–	17	.452
Northwestern	7	–	13	.350	15	–	16	.484
Nebraska	4	–	16	.200	10	–	22	.313
Minnesota	4	–	16	.200	13	–	17	.433
† Conference tournament winner Rankings from AP poll

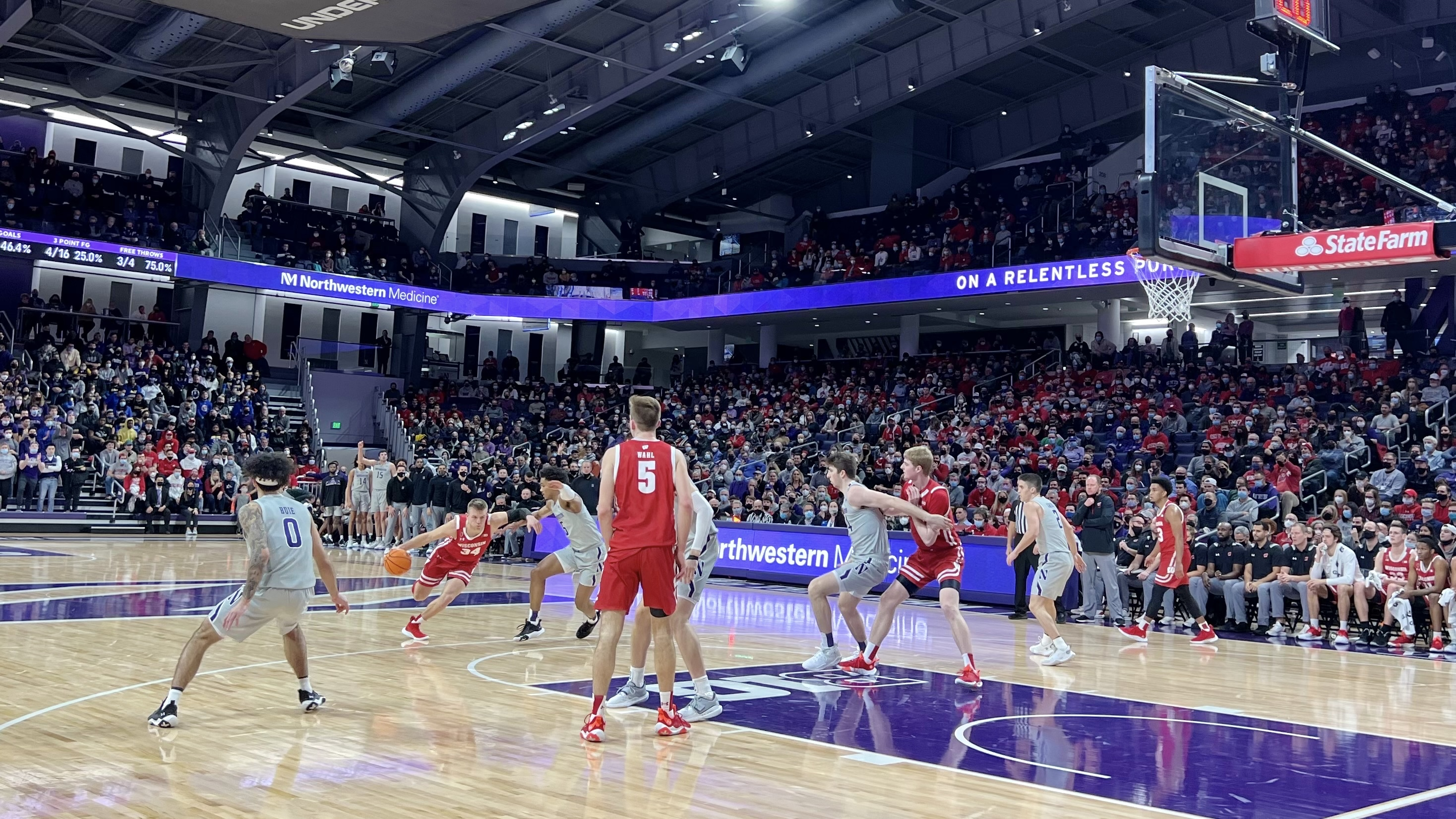
During the game at Northwestern

The 2021–22 Wisconsin Badgers men's basketball team represented the University of Wisconsin–Madison in the 2021–22 NCAA Division I men's basketball season. The Badgers were led by seventh-year head coach Greg Gard and played their home games at the Kohl Center in Madison, Wisconsin as members of the Big Ten Conference. They finished the season 25–8, 15–5 in Big Ten play to earn a share of the regular season championship. As the No. 2 seed in the Big Ten tournament, they lost Michigan State in the quarterfinals. They received an at-large bid to the NCAA tournament as the No. 3 seed in the Midwest region, the school's 26th trip to the tournament. They defeated Colgate in the First Round before being upset by No. 11 seed Iowa State in the Second Round.

== Previous season ==
In a season limited due to the ongoing COVID-19 pandemic, the Badgers finished the 2020–21 season 18–13, 10–10 in Big Ten play to finish tied for sixth place. They defeated Penn State in the second round of the Big Ten tournament, but lost to Iowa in the quarterfinals. They received an at-large bid to the NCAA tournament, their 25th trip to the NCAA Tournament, as the No. 9 seed in the South region. The Badgers defeated North Carolina in the First Round before losing to eventual National champion Baylor in the Second Round.

== Offseason ==
=== Departures ===
All players listed as "graduated" are tentative departures unless otherwise noted. Due to COVID-19, the NCAA ruled that the 2020–21 season would not count against the college eligibility of any basketball player. Every senior in the 2020–21 season has the option to return for 2021–22.

Wisconsin Departures
Name	Number	Pos.	Height	Weight	Year	Hometown	Reason for Departure
D'Mitrik Trice	0	G	6'0"	184	(redshirt) Senior	Huber Heights, OH	Graduated
Aleem Ford	2	F	6'8"	217	(redshirt) Senior	Lawrenceville, GA	Graduated
Walt McGrory	3	G	6'3"	205	Senior	Edina, MN	Transferred to South Dakota
Micah Potter	11	F	6'10"	248	(redshirt) Senior	Mentor, OH	Graduated
Trevor Anderson	12	G	6'2"	200	(redshirt) Senior	Stevens Point, WI	Transferred to Valparaiso
Joe Hedstrom	32	C	7'0"	240	(redshirt) Sophomore	Hopkins, MN	Transferred to Valparaiso
Nate Reuvers	35	F	6'11"	235	Senior	Lakeville, MN	Graduated

=== Incoming transfers ===
Wisconsin incoming transfers
Name	Number	Pos.	Height	Weight	Year	Hometown	Previous School
Jahcobi Neath	0	G	6'4"	196	Junior	Toronto, ON	Wake Forest
Isaac Lindsey	10	G	6'4"	184	Sophomore	Mineral Point, WI	UNLV
Chris Vogt	33	C	7'0"	257	Graduate Student	Mayfield, KY	Cincinnati

=== 2021 recruiting class ===
College recruiting
Name	Hometown	School	Height	Weight	Commit date
Chucky Hepburn; PG	Bellevue, NE	Bellevue West High School	6 ft 1 in (1.85 m)	185 lb (84 kg)	Sep 29, 2019
Chucky Hepburn; PG	Recruit ratings: Scout: Rivals: 247Sports: (81)				
Matthew Mors; PF	Yankton, SD	Yankton High School	6 ft 7 in (2.01 m)	220 lb (100 kg)	Sep 29, 2019
Matthew Mors; PF	Recruit ratings: Scout: Rivals: 247Sports: (80)				
Chris Hodges; PF	Schaumburg, IL	Schaumburg High School	6 ft 8 in (2.03 m)	235 lb (107 kg)	Aug 15, 2019
Chris Hodges; PF	Recruit ratings: Scout: Rivals: 247Sports: (77)				
Markus Ilver; PF	Tallinn, Estonia	Western Reserve Academy	6 ft 8 in (2.03 m)	195 lb (88 kg)	Jan 13, 2021
Markus Ilver; PF	Recruit ratings: Scout: Rivals: 247Sports: (80)				
Overall recruit ranking:
Note: In many cases, Scout, Rivals, 247Sports, On3, and ESPN may conflict in their listings of height and weight.; In these cases, the average was taken. ESPN grades are on a 100-point scale.; Sources: "2021 Wisconsin Commitments". Rivals.; "Men's Basketball Recruiting". Scout.; "ESPN- Wisconsin Badgers Men's Basketball Recruiting". ESPN.; "Scout.com Team Recruiting Rankings". Scout.; "2021 Team Ranking". Rivals.

=== Returning players ===
On April 14, 2021 Brad Davison announced via Instagram that he is returning for the 2021–22 season his final year of eligibility. In the post he would say "After taking some time to reflect, there is no place I would rather be than Madison! Being a Badger is a privilege. I am grateful for one last ride with my coaches and teammates this upcoming season! I would not want to go out any other way than playing in front of Badger Nation at the Kohl Center!". He is the only senior of seven from the 2020–21 season that decided to return to Wisconsin to use his last year of eligibility.

== Roster ==
2021–22 Wisconsin Badgers men's basketball team
Players
Coaches

Pos.	#	Name	Height	Weight	Year	Previous school	Hometown
G	0	Jahcobi Neath	6 ft 4 in (1.93 m)	196 lb (89 kg)	Jr	Crestwood Prep/Wake Forest	Toronto, Ontario
G	1	Johnny Davis	6 ft 5 in (1.96 m)	194 lb (88 kg)	So	La Crosse Central High School	La Crosse, Wisconsin
G	2	Jordan Davis	6 ft 4 in (1.93 m)	198 lb (90 kg)	So	La Crosse Central High School	La Crosse, Wisconsin
G	4	Carter Higginbottom (W)	6 ft 0 in (1.83 m)	193 lb (88 kg)	RS Jr	St. Ignatius College Prep (IL)	Chicago, Illinois
F	5	Tyler Wahl	6 ft 9 in (2.06 m)	221 lb (100 kg)	Jr	North High School	Lakeville, Minnesota
G	10	Isaac Lindsey (W)	6 ft 4 in (1.93 m)	184 lb (83 kg)	So	Mineral Point High School/UNLV	Mineral Point, Wisconsin
G	11	Lorne Bowman II	6 ft 2 in (1.88 m)	210 lb (95 kg)	Fr	St. Mary's High School	Detroit, Michigan
G	13	Justin Taphorn (W)	6 ft 5 in (1.96 m)	208 lb (94 kg)	So	Perkin High School	Pekin, Illinois
F	14	Carter Gilmore	6 ft 7 in (2.01 m)	224 lb (102 kg)	So	Arrowhead High School	Hartland, Wisconsin
F	20	Ben Carlson	6 ft 9 in (2.06 m)	226 lb (103 kg)	So	East Ridge High School	Woodbury, Minnesota
F	21	Chris Hodges (redshirt)	6 ft 9 in (2.06 m)	239 lb (108 kg)	Fr	Schaumburg High School	Schaumburg, Illinois
F	22	Steven Crowl	7 ft 0 in (2.13 m)	234 lb (106 kg)	So	Eastview High School	Eagan, Minnesota
G	23	Chucky Hepburn	6 ft 2 in (1.88 m)	211 lb (96 kg)	Fr	Bellevue West High School	Omaha, Nebraska
F	32	Matthew Mors (redshirt)	6 ft 7 in (2.01 m)	241 lb (109 kg)	Fr	Yankton High School	Yankton, South Dakota
C	33	Chris Vogt	7 ft 0 in (2.13 m)	257 lb (117 kg)	GS	Graves County High School/Cincinnati	Mayfield, Kentucky
G	34	Brad Davison	6 ft 4 in (1.93 m)	200 lb (91 kg)	GS	Maple Grove High School	Maple Grove, Minnesota
F	35	Markus Ilver	6 ft 8 in (2.03 m)	219 lb (99 kg)	Fr	Western Reserve Academy	Tallinn, Estonia

Head coach

- Greg Gard (UW-Platteville)

Assistant coach(es)

- Joe Krabbenhoft (Wisconsin)
- Dean Oliver (Iowa)
- Sharif Chambliss (Wisconsin)

Legend

- (C) Team captain
- (S) Suspended
- (I) Ineligible
- (W) Walk-on
- Injured
- Current redshirt

Roster

== Schedule and results ==
Date time, TV	Rank^{#}	Opponent^{#}	Result	Record	High points	High rebounds	High assists	Site (attendance) city, state
Exhibition
October 29, 2021*; 6:00 p.m., BTN+		Wisconsin–Whitewater	W 76–50	–	18 – Crowl	7 – Tied	4 – Hepburn	Kohl Center (15,997); Madison, WI
Regular season
November 9, 2021*; 7:00 p.m., BTN+		St. Francis Brooklyn	W 81–58	1–0	15 – Jon. Davis	9 – Vogt	5 – Jon. Davis	Kohl Center (15,735); Madison, WI
November 12, 2021*; 7:00 p.m., BTN+		Green Bay	W 72–34	2–0	18 – Crowl	7 – Tied	2 – Tied	Kohl Center (16,005); Madison, WI
November 15, 2021*; 8:00 p.m., FS1		Providence; Gavitt Tipoff Games	L 58–63	2–1	25 – Davison	7 – Davison	2 – Tied	Kohl Center (15,773); Madison, WI
November 22, 2021*; 1:00 p.m., ESPN2		vs. Texas A&M; Maui Invitational quarterfinal	W 69–58	3–1	21 – Jon. Davis	9 – Jon. Davis	3 – Davison	Michelob Ultra Arena; Paradise, NV
November 23, 2021*; 4:00 p.m., ESPN		vs. No. 12 Houston; Maui Invitational semifinal	W 65–63	4–1	30 – Jon. Davis	7 – Wahl	3 – Hepburn	Michelob Ultra Arena; Paradise, NV
November 24, 2021*; 4:00 p.m., ESPN		vs. Saint Mary's; Maui Invitational championship	W 61–55	5–1	20 – Jon. Davis	7 – Tied	1 – Tied	Michelob Ultra Arena (2,901); Paradise, NV
December 1, 2021*; 8:15 p.m., ESPN2	No. 23	at Georgia Tech; ACC–Big Ten Challenge	W 70–66	6–1	27 – Davison	6 – Tied	5 – Jon. Davis	McCamish Pavilion (6,302); Atlanta, GA
December 4, 2021*; 11:30 a.m., FOX	No. 23	Marquette; Rivalry	W 89–76	7–1	25 – Jon. Davis	8 – Crowl	6 – Hepburn	Kohl Center (17,287); Madison, WI
December 8, 2021; 6:00 p.m., BTN	No. 22	Indiana	W 64–59	8–1 (1–0)	23 – Jon. Davis	12 – Wahl	3 – Tied	Kohl Center (16,013); Madison, WI
December 11, 2021; 11:00 a.m., BTN	No. 22	at No. 21 Ohio State	L 55–73	8–2 (1–1)	24 – Jon. Davis	7 – Jon. Davis	3 – Jon. Davis	Value City Arena (13,856); Columbus, OH
December 15, 2021*; 7:00 p.m., BTN		Nicholls	W 71–68	9–2	19 – Davison	7 – Neath	2 – Tied	Kohl Center (15,752); Madison, WI
December 23, 2021*; 6:00 p.m., BTN	No. 24	Morgan State	Canceled due to COVID-19 complications within the Morgan State program					Kohl Center; Madison, WI
December 23, 2021*; 6:00 p.m., BTN	No. 24	George Mason	Canceled due to COVID-19 complications within the Wisconsin program					Kohl Center; Madison, WI
December 29, 2021*; 7:00 p.m., BTN	No. 24	Illinois State	W 89–85	10–2	21 – Crowl	11 – Jon. Davis	4 – Tied	Kohl Center (15,718); Madison, WI
January 3, 2022; 6:00 p.m., BTN	No. 23	at No. 3 Purdue	W 74–69	11–2 (2–1)	37 – Jon. Davis	14 – Jon. Davis	3 – Tied	Mackey Arena (14,804); West Lafayette, IN
January 6, 2022; 8:00 p.m., FS1	No. 23	Iowa	W 87–78	12–2 (3–1)	26 – Jon. Davis	9 – Tied	5 – Jon. Davis	Kohl Center (15,212); Madison, WI
January 9, 2022; 6:30 p.m., BTN	No. 23	at Maryland	W 70–69	13–2 (4–1)	21 – Wahl	8 – Wahl	2 – Tied	Xfinity Center (10,864); College Park, MD
January 13, 2022; 6:00 p.m., ESPN2	No. 13	No. 16 Ohio State	W 78–68	14–2 (5–1)	25 – Davison	9 – Jon. Davis	6 – Wahl	Kohl Center (15,571); Madison, WI
January 18, 2022; 8:00 p.m., BTN	No. 8	at Northwestern	W 82–76	15–2 (6–1)	27 – Jon. Davis	11 – Wahl	4 – Tied	Welsh–Ryan Arena (5,251); Evanston, IL
January 21, 2022; 8:00 p.m., FS1	No. 8	No. 14 Michigan State	L 74–86	15–3 (6–2)	25 – Jon. Davis	5 – Jon. Davis	4 – Jon. Davis	Kohl Center (17,287); Madison, WI
January 27, 2022; 4:00 p.m., BTN	No. 11	at Nebraska	W 73–65	16–3 (7–2)	21 – Davison	10 – Wahl	4 – Davison	Pinnacle Bank Arena (15,385); Lincoln, NE
January 30, 2022; 12:00 p.m., BTN	No. 11	Minnesota	W 66–60	17–3 (8–2)	16 – Jon. Davis	15 – Jon. Davis	2 – Tied	Kohl Center (17,287); Madison, WI
February 2, 2022; 8:00 p.m., BTN	No. 11	at No. 18 Illinois	L 67–80	17–4 (8–3)	22 – Jon. Davis	15 – Jon. Davis	2 – Tied	State Farm Center (14,860); Champaign, IL
February 5, 2022; 5:00 p.m., BTN	No. 11	Penn State	W 51–49	18–4 (9–3)	13 – Crowl	9 – Jon. Davis	5 – Crowl	Kohl Center (17,287); Madison, WI
February 8, 2022; 6:00 p.m., BTN	No. 14	at No. 17 Michigan State	W 70–62	19–4 (10–3)	25 – Jon. Davis	6 – Jon. Davis	3 – Tied	Breslin Center (14,797); East Lansing, MI
February 12, 2022; 1:00 p.m., FS1	No. 14	Rutgers	L 65–73	19–5 (10–4)	23 – Wahl	8 – Jon. Davis	3 – Tied	Kohl Center (17,287); Madison, WI
February 15, 2022; 8:00 p.m., ESPN2	No. 15	at Indiana	W 74–69	20–5 (11–4)	30 – Jon. Davis	12 – Jon. Davis	3 – Hepburn	Simon Skjodt Assembly Hall (17,222); Bloomington, IN
February 20, 2022; 12:00 p.m., CBS	No. 15	Michigan	W 77–63	21–5 (12–4)	25 – Jon. Davis	6 – Tied	4 – Hepburn	Kohl Center (17,287); Madison, WI
February 23, 2022; 8:00 p.m., BTN	No. 13	at Minnesota	W 68–67	22–5 (13–4)	20 – Crowl	10 – Wahl	3 – Tied	Williams Arena (11,761); Minneapolis, MN
February 26, 2022; 5:00 p.m., BTN	No. 13	at Rutgers	W 66–61	23–5 (14–4)	19 – Jon. Davis	9 – Wahl	5 – Hepburn	Jersey Mike's Arena (8,227); Piscataway, NJ
March 1, 2022; 8:00 p.m., ESPN	No. 10	No. 8 Purdue	W 70–67	24–5 (15–4)	19 – Wahl	8 – Jon. Davis	2 – Tied	Kohl Center (17,287); Madison, WI
March 6, 2022; 1:00 p.m., BTN	No. 10	Nebraska	L 73–74	24–6 (15–5)	20 – Davison	7 – Tied	3 – Tied	Kohl Center (17,287); Madison, WI
Big Ten tournament
March 11, 2022; 5:30 p.m., BTN	(2) No. 12	vs. (7) Michigan State; Quarterfinals	L 63–69	24–7	23 – Davison	11 – Joh. Davis	4 – Hepburn	Gainbridge Fieldhouse (16,415); Indianapolis, IN
NCAA tournament
March 18, 2022*; 8:50 p.m., TBS	(3 MW) No. 14	vs. (14 MW) Colgate; First Round	W 67–60	25–7	25 – Jon. Davis	9 – Wahl	9 – Hepburn	Fiserv Forum (17,500); Milwaukee, WI
March 20, 2022*; 5:10 p.m., TNT	(3 MW) No. 14	vs. (11 MW) Iowa State; Second Round	L 49–54	25–8	17 – Jon. Davis	9 – Jon. Davis	4 – Davison	Fiserv Forum (17,500); Milwaukee, WI
*Non-conference game. ^{#}Rankings from AP Poll. (#) Tournament seedings in parentheses. All times are in Central Time.

== Rankings ==
Ranking movements Legend: ██ Increase in ranking ██ Decrease in ranking — = Not ranked RV = Received votes
	Week																			
Poll	Pre	1	2	3	4	5	6	7	8	9	10	11	12	13	14	15	16	17	18	Final
AP	—	—	—	23	22	RV	24	24	23	13	8	11	11	14	15	13	10	12	14	Not released
Coaches	—	—^	—	21	17	RV	24	23	23	13	8	11	11	14	16	12	10	12	14	18

*AP does not release post-NCAA Tournament rankings
^Coaches did not release a Week 1 poll.

== Player statistics ==
Individual player statistics (Through 2021–22 season)
			Minutes		Scoring		Total FGs			3-point FGs			Free Throws			Rebounds								
Player	GP	GS	Tot	Avg	Pts	Avg	FG	FGA	Pct	3FG	3FA	Pct	FT	FTA	Pct	Off	Def	Tot	Avg	A	TO	Blk	Stl	PF
Davis, Johnny	31	31	1061	34.2	612	19.7	210	492	.427	37	121	.306	155	196	.791	41	214	255	8.2	66	71	23	36	71
Davison, Brad	33	33	1136	34.4	464	14.1	139	362	.384	78	225	.347	108	125	.864	11	121	132	4.0	69	29	0	28	79
Wahl, Tyler	32	32	796	30.5	366	11.4	145	281	.516	6	37	.162	70	100	.700	52	137	189	5.9	49	52	25	37	80
Crowl, Steven	33	33	836	25.3	290	8.8	114	230	.496	26	82	.317	36	45	.800	48	96	144	4.4	48	31	9	9	84
Hepburn, Chucky	33	33	1022	31.0	262	7.9	92	237	.388	39	112	.348	39	56	.696	7	63	70	2.1	77	39	5	36	70
Bowman II, Lorne	22	0	228	10.4	66	3.0	21	61	.344	12	30	.400	12	25	.480	3	21	24	1.1	11	13	0	6	24
Vogt, Chris	33	0	424	12.8	97	2.9	39	78	.500	0	1	.000	19	37	.514	51	52	103	3.1	21	18	26	11	76
Carlson, Ben	32	2	292	9.1	52	1.6	22	66	.333	1	21	.048	7	13	.538	25	40	65	2.0	4	10	1	2	17
Neath, Jahcobi	23	1	224	9.7	37	1.6	11	43	.256	4	18	.222	11	15	.733	9	25	34	1.5	8	6	1	4	13
Davis, Jordan	27	0	175	6.5	35	1.3	13	40	.325	8	28	.286	1	3	.333	9	15	24	0.9	4	6	3	4	19
Gilmore, Carter	22	0	173	7.9	19	0.9	7	27	.259	1	13	.077	4	7	.571	6	16	22	1.0	8	2	4	2	20
Ilver, Markus	8	0	29	3.6	5	0.6	1	8	.125	0	5	.000	3	4	.750	1	3	4	0.5	0	2	0	0	7
Lindsey, Isaac	6	0	13	2.2	3	0.5	1	5	.200	1	3	.333	0	0	-	0	0	0	0.0	0	0	0	0	0
Higginbottom, Carter	6	0	6	1.0	0	0.0	0	1	.000	0	0	.-	0	0	-	0	0	0	0.0	0	2	0	0	2
Taphorn, Justin	4	0	5	1.3	0	0.0	0	0	.-	0	0	.-	0	0	-	0	0	0	0.0	0	1	0	0	0
Total	33	-	6600	-	2308	69.9	815	1931	.422	213	696	.306	465	626	.743	308	848	1156	35.0	365	287	97	175	554
Opponents	33	-	6600	-	2177	66.0	813	1870	.435	204	628	.325	347	508	.683	274	876	1150	34.8	381	377	109	155	624

Legend
GP	Games played	GS	Games started	Avg	Average per game
FG	Field-goals made	FGA	Field-goal attempts	Off	Offensive rebounds
Def	Defensive rebounds	A	Assists	TO	Turnovers
Blk	Blocks	Stl	Steals	High	Team high
