= Greg Gard =

American basketball coach (born 1970)

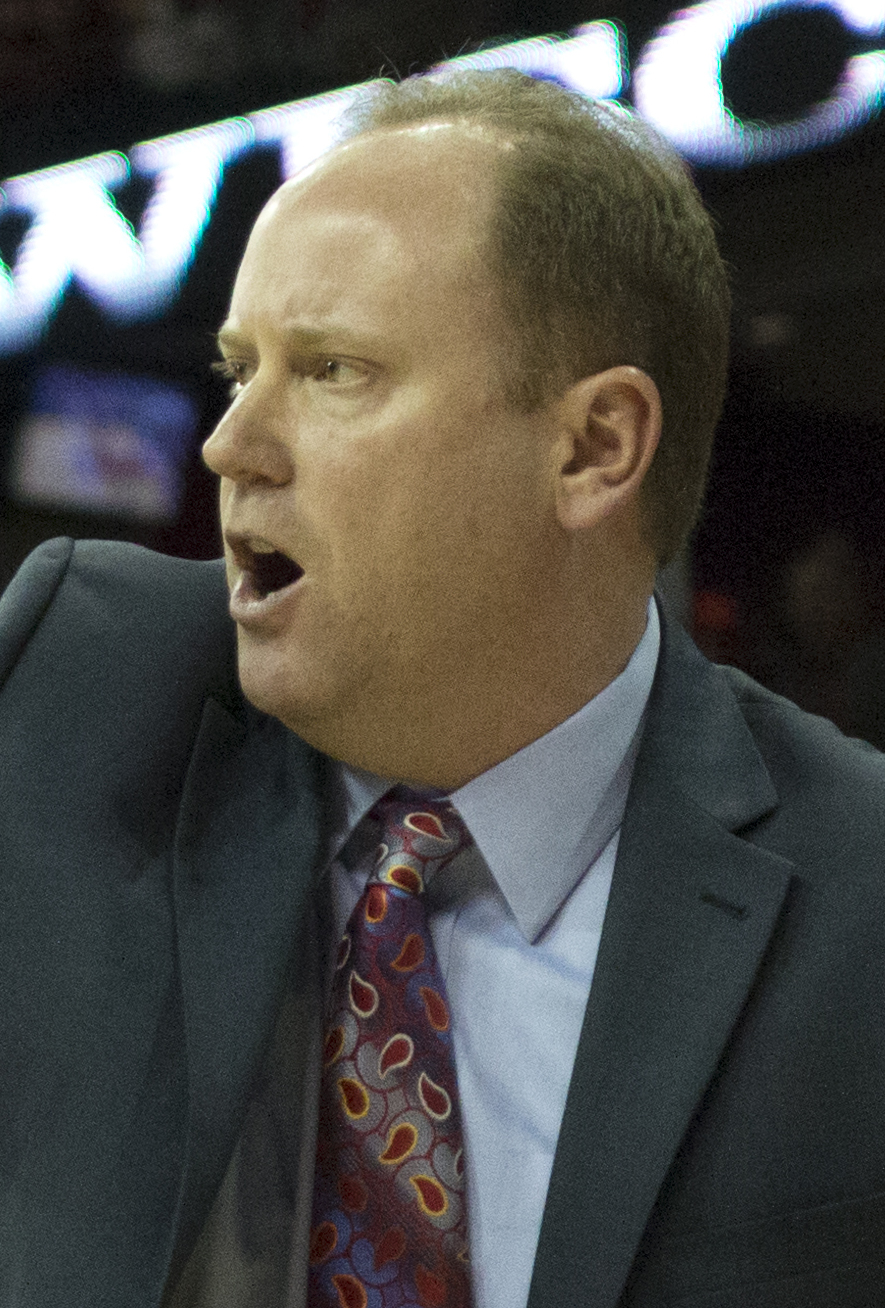
- Gard in February 2016

Current position
- Title: Head coach
- Team: Wisconsin
- Conference: Big Ten
- Record: 241–130 (.650)
- Annual salary: $3.55 million

Biographical details
- Born: December 3, 1970 (age 55); Cobb, Wisconsin, U.S.
- Education: Wisconsin–Platteville ('95)

Coaching career (HC unless noted)
- 1990–1993: Southwestern HS (assistant)
- 1993–1994: Platteville HS (assistant)
- 1993–1999: Wisconsin–Platteville (assistant)
- 1999–2001: Milwaukee (assistant)
- 2001–2008: Wisconsin (assistant)
- 2008–2015: Wisconsin (associate HC)
- 2015–present: Wisconsin

Head coaching record
- Overall: 241–130 (.650)
- Tournaments: 7–8 (NCAA Division I); 3–1 (NIT); 13–10 (Big Ten)

Accomplishments and honors

Championships
- 2 Big Ten regular season (2020, 2022)

Awards
- Jim Phelan Award (2016); 2× Big Ten Coach of the Year (2020, 2022)

Gregory Glen Gard (born December 3, 1970) is an American college basketball coach, currently the Badgers men's basketball head coach at the University of Wisconsin. He took over in 2015, after Bo Ryan announced his retirement midseason. Gard had been an assistant at Wisconsin since 2001.

== Coaching career ==
=== Assistant coach ===
On December 15, 2015, Gard was announced as the interim head coach after Bo Ryan announced his retirement following the Badgers win over Texas A&M Corpus Christi. Gard had been Ryan's longest-serving assistant, having coached together for 23 years at the time of the transition. They had coached together at three schools—Gard's alma mater of Wisconsin–Platteville, where he had played on the varsity baseball team as a freshman; Milwaukee; and Wisconsin. In the process, Gard became one of the most respected assistant coaches in the college game.

=== Head coach ===
==== 2015–16 season ====
After Gard took over in the 2015–2016 season, the team stumbled, winning just two of their next seven games, with an overall record of 9–9 at that point. However the team's turnaround started with an upset over #4 Michigan State and won 11 of the next 13 games to finish out the regular season tied for third in the Big Ten with an overall record of 20–11 (12–6 in the Big Ten). Following the end of the regular season, on March 7, 2016, Wisconsin removed the interim tag and Gard was promoted to head coach of the Badgers. Wisconsin received an at-large bid to the NCAA tournament, where they beat #10 seeded Pittsburgh in the first round. Wisconsin defeated #2 seeded Xavier by a 3-point buzzer beater from Bronson Koenig in the second round to advance to the Sweet 16. However they lost to #6 seeded Notre Dame in the Sweet 16. After the season ended Gard was named the 2016 Jim Phelan National Coach of the Year.

==== 2020–21 season ====
===== Leaked recording =====
On June 22, 2021, a surreptitious recording of a meeting, in which several members of the 2020–21 team directed criticism at Gard, was leaked to the Wisconsin State Journal and subsequently posted to YouTube.

==== 2021–22 season ====
===== 2022 postgame fight =====
A fight took place involving Gard after the February 20, 2022 game between the Michigan Wolverines and the Wisconsin Badgers at the Kohl Center. During the game, Gard took two timeouts in the final minute as the Badgers held a significant lead over the Wolverines. Gard explained in an interview after the fight that the timeout was taken to reset the play as the ball had not yet crossed into Michigan's side of the court within 10 seconds, which would have led to a turnover. After the timeout, Wisconsin was able to advance the ball into Michigan's half of the court and the game ended soon afterward in a Badgers win with a score of 77–63.

During the handshakes between the teams, Michigan Coach Juwan Howard appeared to initially ignore Coach Greg Gard and then attempted to walk past as Gard approached Howard and put his hands on Howard at the usual post-game handshake. Howard stated that he did not want to be touched and expressed his displeasure with the timeouts, grabbing Gard by the shirt at which point others began to separate them. Gard and Howard began yelling at one another, even as they were separated by their respective squads and security personnel, leading to a verbal escalation between the two coaches. As things continued to escalate, Howard reached in and struck Wisconsin assistant coach Joe Krabbenhoft with an open hand. This led to both teams to begin fighting each other. While most of the fight was pushes and shoves, at least three players threw punches; forward Moussa Diabaté for Michigan who was a starter for the game, forward Terrance Williams II for Michigan, and guard Jahcobi Neath for Wisconsin. The actions of both coaches and the players were condemned, which Howard receiving the majority for his physical contact against Krabbenhoft. The Big Ten Conference released a statement that they were reviewing the postgame events. The following day, Gard was fined $10,000 for his actions for violating the Big Ten's sportsmanship policy while Howard was suspended for the remainder of Michigan's regular season and fined $40,000.

In the 2026 NCAA March Madness tournament the Badgers were eliminated in the first round against 12th-seeded High Point. It was the third time Gard's Badgers lost in the first round against a 12th-seed.

== Head coaching record ==
Record table
| Season | Team | Overall | Conference | Standing | Postseason |
|---|---|---|---|---|---|
Wisconsin Badgers (Big Ten Conference) (2015–present)
| 2015–16 | Wisconsin | 15–8 | 12–6 | T–3rd | NCAA Division I Sweet 16 |
| 2016–17 | Wisconsin | 27–10 | 12–6 | T–2nd | NCAA Division I Sweet 16 |
| 2017–18 | Wisconsin | 15–18 | 7–11 | 9th | |
| 2018–19 | Wisconsin | 23–11 | 14–6 | 4th | NCAA Division I Round of 64 |
| 2019–20 | Wisconsin | 21–10 | 14–6 | T–1st | NCAA Division I canceled |
| 2020–21 | Wisconsin | 18–13 | 10–10 | T–6th | NCAA Division I Round of 32 |
| 2021–22 | Wisconsin | 25–8 | 15–5 | T–1st | NCAA Division I Round of 32 |
| 2022–23 | Wisconsin | 20–15 | 9–11 | T–11th | NIT Semifinal |
| 2023–24 | Wisconsin | 22–14 | 11–9 | 5th | NCAA Division I Round of 64 |
| 2024–25 | Wisconsin | 27–10 | 13–7 | T–4th | NCAA Division I Round of 32 |
| 2025–26 | Wisconsin | 24–11 | 14–6 | 5th | NCAA Division I Round of 64 |
| 2026–27 | Wisconsin | 4–2 | 0–0 | | |
| Wisconsin: | | 241–130 (.650) | 131–83 (.612) | | |
| Total: | | 241–130 (.650) | | | |
National champion Postseason invitational champion Conference regular season champion Conference regular season and conference tournament champion Division regular season champion Division regular season and conference tournament champion Conference tournament champion
