= 2018–19 Iowa Hawkeyes men's basketball team =

American college basketball season

2018–19 Iowa Hawkeyes men's basketball

2K Sports Classic champions

NCAA tournament, Second Round
- Conference: Big Ten Conference
- Record: 23–12 (10–10 Big Ten)
- Head coach: Fran McCaffery (9th season)
- Assistant coaches: Sherman Dillard; Andrew Francis; Kirk Speraw
- Home arena: Carver–Hawkeye Arena

2018–19 Big Ten Conference men's basketball standings
	Conf.				Overall
Team	W		L	PCT	W		L	PCT
No. 5 Michigan State †	16	–	4	.800	32	–	7	.821
No. 13 Purdue	16	–	4	.800	26	–	10	.722
No. 8 Michigan	15	–	5	.750	30	–	7	.811
No. 21 Wisconsin	14	–	6	.700	23	–	11	.676
Maryland	13	–	7	.650	23	–	11	.676
Iowa	10	–	10	.500	23	–	12	.657
Minnesota	9	–	11	.450	22	–	14	.611
Ohio State	8	–	12	.400	20	–	15	.571
Indiana	8	–	12	.400	19	–	16	.543
Penn State	7	–	13	.350	14	–	18	.438
Illinois	7	–	13	.350	12	–	21	.364
Rutgers	7	–	13	.350	14	–	17	.452
Nebraska	6	–	14	.300	19	–	17	.528
Northwestern	4	–	16	.200	13	–	19	.406
† 2019 Big Ten tournament winner Rankings from AP poll

The 2018–19 Iowa Hawkeyes men's basketball team represented the University of Iowa during the 2018–19 NCAA Division I men's basketball season. The team was led by ninth-year head coach Fran McCaffery and played their home games at Carver–Hawkeye Arena as members of the Big Ten Conference. The Hawkeyes finished the season 23–12, 10–10 in Big Ten play to finish in sixth place. They defeated Illinois in the second round of the Big Ten tournament before losing to Michigan in the quarterfinals. They received an at-large bid to the NCAA tournament as the No. 10 seed in the South region. There they defeated No. 7-seeded Cincinnati in the First Round before losing to No. 2-seeded Tennessee in the Second Round.

== Previous season ==
The Hawkeyes finished the 2017–18 season 14–19, 4–14 in Big Ten play to finish in a three-way tie for 11th place. As the No. 12 seed in the Big Ten tournament, they defeated Illinois before losing to Michigan in the second round.

== Offseason ==
=== Departures ===
Name	Number	Pos.	Height	Weight	Year	Hometown	Reason for departure
Ahmad Wagner	0	F	6'7"	235	Junior	Yellow Springs, OH	Transferred to Kentucky (football)
Charlie Rose	11	G	6'4"	185	Senior	Elmhurst, IL	Graduated
Brady Ellingson	24	G	6'4"	193	RS Junior	Menomonee Falls, WI	Transferred to Drake
Dom Uhl	25	F	6'9"	217	Senior	Frankfurt, Germany	Graduated

=== 2018 recruiting class ===
College recruiting information
Name	Hometown	School	Height	Weight	Commit date
Joe Wieskamp; SG	Muscatine, IA	Muscatine High School	6 ft 5 in (1.96 m)	195 lb (88 kg)	Jun 9, 2015
Joe Wieskamp; SG	Recruit ratings: Scout: Rivals: 247Sports: ESPN:				
CJ Fredrick; SG	Cincinnati, OH	Covington Catholic High School	6 ft 4 in (1.93 m)	165 lb (75 kg)	Aug 5, 2017
CJ Fredrick; SG	Recruit ratings: Scout: Rivals: 247Sports: ESPN:				
Overall recruit ranking:
Note: In many cases, Scout, Rivals, 247Sports, On3, and ESPN may conflict in their listings of height and weight.; In these cases, the average was taken. ESPN grades are on a 100-point scale.; Sources: "ESPN- Iowa Hawkeyes Men's Basketball Recruiting". ESPN.; "2018 Team Ranking". Rivals.

== Roster ==
2018–19 Iowa Hawkeyes men's basketball team
Players
Coaches

Pos.	#	Name	Height	Weight	Year	Previous school	Hometown
F	0	Michael Baer (W)	6 ft 6 in (1.98 m)	200 lb (91 kg)	So	Bettendorf High School	Bettendorf, Iowa
G	1	Maishe Dailey	6 ft 7 in (2.01 m)	200 lb (91 kg)	Jr	Beachwood High School	Beachwood, Ohio
F	2	Jack Nunge (redshirt)	6 ft 11 in (2.11 m)	235 lb (107 kg)	So	Castle High School	Newburgh, Indiana
G	3	Jordan Bohannon	6 ft 1 in (1.85 m)	185 lb (84 kg)	Jr	Linn-Mar High School	Marion, Iowa
G	4	Isaiah Moss	6 ft 5 in (1.96 m)	208 lb (94 kg)	RS Jr	Simeon Academy	Chicago, Illinois
G	5	CJ Fredrick (redshirt)	6 ft 3 in (1.91 m)	190 lb (86 kg)	Fr	Covington Catholic High School	Cincinnati, Ohio
G	10	Joe Wieskamp	6 ft 6 in (1.98 m)	205 lb (93 kg)	Fr	Muscatine High School	Muscatine, Iowa
G	13	Austin Ash (W)	6 ft 2 in (1.88 m)	170 lb (77 kg)	RS Fr	Mount Vernon High School	Cedar Rapids, Iowa
F	15	Ryan Kriener	6 ft 9 in (2.06 m)	255 lb (116 kg)	Jr	Spirit Lake High School	Spirit Lake, Iowa
F	20	Riley Till (W)	6 ft 7 in (2.01 m)	205 lb (93 kg)	RS So	Wahlert Catholic High School	Dubuque, Iowa
G	24	Nicolas Hobbs (W)	6 ft 2 in (1.88 m)	200 lb (91 kg)	So	Fenwick High School	Chicago, IL
F	25	Tyler Cook	6 ft 9 in (2.06 m)	253 lb (115 kg)	Jr	Chaminade Prep	St. Louis, Missouri
G	30	Conner McCaffery	6 ft 5 in (1.96 m)	205 lb (93 kg)	RS Fr	Iowa City West High School	Iowa City, Iowa
F	35	Cordell Pemsl (injured)	6 ft 8 in (2.03 m)	230 lb (104 kg)	Jr	Wahlert Catholic High School	Dubuque, Iowa
F	51	Nicholas Baer	6 ft 7 in (2.01 m)	218 lb (99 kg)	RS Sr	Bettendorf High School	Bettendorf, Iowa
F	55	Luka Garza	6 ft 11 in (2.11 m)	245 lb (111 kg)	So	Maret High School	Washington, D.C.

Head coach

- Fran McCaffery (Penn)

Assistant coach(es)

- Sherman Dillard (James Madison)
- Andrew Francis (Southampton)
- Kirk Speraw (Iowa)

Legend

- (C) Team captain
- (S) Suspended
- (I) Ineligible
- (W) Walk-on
- Injured
- Current redshirt

Roster

== Schedule and results ==
The 2018–19 season will mark the first time in Big Ten history that the teams will play a 20-game conference schedule, setting a precedent for all Division I basketball. The new schedule will also include a regional component to increase the frequency of games among teams in similar areas. Over the course of a six-year cycle (12 playing opportunities), in-state rivals will play each other 12 times, regional opponents will play 10 times, and all other teams will play nine times. Three in-state series will be guaranteed home-and-homes: Illinois and Northwestern, Indiana and Purdue, and Michigan and Michigan State will always play twice.

Date time, TV	Rank^{#}	Opponent^{#}	Result	Record	High points	High rebounds	High assists	Site (attendance) city, state
Exhibition
November 4, 2018*; 2:00 pm, BTN Plus		Guilford	W 103–46	–	16 – Wieskamp	9 – Cook	7 – Cook	Carver–Hawkeye Arena (10,324); Iowa City, IA
Regular season
November 8, 2018*; 7:00 pm, BTN Plus		UMKC; 2K Classic campus-site game	W 77–63	1–0	15 – Wieskamp	8 – Tied	5 – Cook	Carver–Hawkeye Arena (9,317); Iowa City, IA
November 11, 2018*; 2:00 pm, BTN Plus		Green Bay; 2K Classic campus-site game	W 93–82	2–0	17 – Tied	7 – Wieskamp	3 – Tied	Carver–Hawkeye Arena (10,597); Iowa City, IA
November 15, 2018*; 8:30 pm, ESPN2		vs. No. 13 Oregon; 2K Classic semifinals	W 77–69	3–0	16 – Bohannon	10 – Cook	3 – Bohannon	Madison Square Garden (14,417); New York, NY
November 16, 2018*; 6:00 pm, ESPN2		vs. UConn; 2K Classic championship	W 91–72	4–0	26 – Cook	8 – Cook	5 – McCaffery	Madison Square Garden (10,909); New York, NY
November 21, 2018*; 7:30 pm, BTN	No. 20	Alabama State	W 105–78	5–0	22 – Garza	5 – Wieskamp	7 – McCaffrey	Carver–Hawkeye Arena (12,939); Iowa City, IA
November 27, 2018*; 8:00 pm, ESPNU	No. 14	Pittsburgh; ACC–Big Ten Challenge	W 69–68	6–0	18 – Wieskamp	11 – Wieskamp	4 – McCaffery	Carver–Hawkeye Arena (10,158); Iowa City, IA
November 30, 2018; 7:00 pm, BTN	No. 14	No. 22 Wisconsin	L 66–72	6–1 (0–1)	19 – Cook	15 – Cook	4 – Cook	Carver–Hawkeye Arena (15,056); Iowa City, IA
December 3, 2018; 5:30 pm, FS1	No. 18	at No. 10 Michigan State	L 68–90	6–2 (0–2)	15 – Cook	9 – Garza	3 – Tied	Breslin Center (14,797); East Lansing, MI
December 6, 2018*; 7:00 pm, FS1	No. 18	Iowa State; Iowa Corn Cy-Hawk Series	W 98–84	7–2	26 – Cook	11 – Cook	5 – Tied	Carver–Hawkeye Arena (13,414); Iowa City, IA
December 15, 2018*; 6:00 pm, BTN	No. 22	vs. Northern Iowa; Hy-Vee Classic	W 77–54	8–2	17 – Tied	13 – Cook	5 – Cook	Wells Fargo Arena (12,236); Des Moines, IA
December 18, 2018*; 8:00 pm, BTN	No. 23	Western Carolina	W 78–60	9–2	18 – Cook	6 – Garza	5 – McCaffery	Carver–Hawkeye Arena (9,642); Iowa City, IA
December 22, 2018*; 12:00 pm, BTN Plus	No. 23	Savannah State	W 110–64	10–2	24 – Wieskamp	9 – Kriener	6 – Moss	Carver–Hawkeye Arena (13,444); Iowa City, IA
December 29, 2018*; 7:00 pm, ESPNU	No. 24	Bryant	W 72–67	11–2	19 – Cook	12 – Cook	6 – Cook	Carver–Hawkeye Arena (13,726); Iowa City, IA
January 3, 2019; 6:00 pm, BTN	No. 25	at Purdue	L 70–86	11–3 (0–3)	24 – Cook	6 – Cook	4 – Wieskamp	Mackey Arena (13,701); West Lafayette, IN
January 6, 2019; 4:30 pm, BTN	No. 25	No. 24 Nebraska	W 93–84	12–3 (1–3)	25 – Bohannon	10 – Moss	5 – Tied	Carver–Hawkeye Arena (11,782); Iowa City, IA
January 9, 2019; 8:00 pm, BTN		at Northwestern	W 73–63	13–3 (2–3)	19 – Wieskamp	10 – Baer	4 – Moss	Welsh–Ryan Arena (7,039); Evanston, IL
January 12, 2019; 1:30 pm, BTN		No. 16 Ohio State	W 72–62	14–3 (3–3)	16 – Garza	8 – Cook	8 – Bohannon	Carver–Hawkeye Arena (14,528); Iowa City, IA
January 16, 2019; 6:00 pm, BTN	No. 23	at Penn State	W 89–82	15–3 (4–3)	22 – Garza	12 – Garza	6 – Bohannon	Bryce Jordan Center (7,733); University Park, PA
January 20, 2019; 12:00 pm, BTN	No. 23	Illinois	W 95–71	16–3 (5–3)	24 – Wieskamp	7 – Cook	8 – McCaffery	Carver–Hawkeye Arena (13,589); Iowa City, IA
January 24, 2019; 6:00 pm, FS1	No. 19	No. 6 Michigan State	L 67–82	16–4 (5–4)	20 – Garza	6 – Cook	5 – McCaffrey	Carver–Hawkeye Arena (14,416); Iowa City, IA
January 27, 2019; 4:00 pm, FS1	No. 19	at Minnesota	L 87–92	16–5 (5–5)	25 – Garza	9 – Cook	5 – Bohannon	Williams Arena (11,582); Minneapolis, MN
February 1, 2019; 6:00 pm, FS1		No. 5 Michigan	W 74–59	17–5 (6–5)	19 – Garza	10 – Kriener	2 – Wieskamp	Carver–Hawkeye Arena (15,056); Iowa City, IA
February 7, 2019; 8:00 pm, ESPN	No. 20	at Indiana	W 77–72	18–5 (7–5)	25 – Bohannon	7 – Cook	6 – Bohannon	Simon Skjodt Assembly Hall (17,222); Bloomington, IN
February 10, 2019; 5:30 pm, BTN	No. 20	Northwestern	W 80–79	19–5 (8–5)	21 – Wieskamp	11 – Cook	5 – McCaffery	Carver–Hawkeye Arena (11,888); Iowa City, IA
February 16, 2019; 5:00 pm, FS1	No. 21	at Rutgers	W 71–69	20–5 (9–5)	18 – Bohannon	7 – Tied	5 – Bohannon	Louis Brown Athletic Center (8,000); Piscataway, NJ
February 19, 2019; 7:00 pm, BTN	No. 21	No. 24 Maryland	L 65–66	20–6 (9–6)	14 – Bohannon	10 – Moss	4 – Tied	Carver–Hawkeye Arena (11,986); Iowa City, IA
February 22, 2019; 8:00 pm, FS1	No. 21	Indiana	W 76–70 ^{OT}	21–6 (10–6)	18 – Cook	10 – Baer	5 – McCaffery	Carver–Hawkeye Arena (15,056); Iowa City, IA
February 26, 2019; 6:00 pm, BTN	No. 22	at Ohio State	L 70–90	21–7 (10–7)	17 – Wieskamp	10 – Cook	3 – McCaffery	Value City Arena (14,118); Columbus, OH
March 2, 2019; 4:00 pm, BTN	No. 22	Rutgers	L 72–86	21–8 (10–8)	17 – Baer	9 – Wieskamp	3 – Wieskamp	Carver–Hawkeye Arena (15,056); Iowa City, IA
March 7, 2019; 6:00 pm, ESPN		at No. 21 Wisconsin	L 45–65	21–9 (10–9)	8 – Tied	7 – Cook	2 – Tied	Kohl Center (17,287); Madison, WI
March 10, 2019; 1:00 pm, BTN		at Nebraska	L 91–93 ^{OT}	21–10 (10–10)	25 – Garza	9 – Cook	5 – Bohannon	Pinnacle Bank Arena; Lincoln, NE
Big Ten tournament
March 14, 2019; 8:30 pm, BTN	(6)	vs. (11) Illinois; Second Round	W 83–62	22–10	17 – Baer	7 – Wieskamp	8 – McCaffery	United Center; Chicago, IL
March 15, 2019; 8:30 pm, BTN	(6)	vs. (3) No. 10 Michigan; Quarterfinals	L 53–74	22–11	14 – Tied	6 – Cook	3 – Bohannon	United Center (18,575); Chicago, IL
NCAA tournament
March 22, 2019*; 11:15 am, CBS	(10 S)	vs. (7 S) No. 22 Cincinnati; First Round	W 79–72	23–11	20 – Garza	6 – Garza	4 – Tied	Nationwide Arena (19,641); Columbus, OH
March 24, 2019*; 11:10 am, CBS	(10 S)	vs. (2 S) No. 6 Tennessee; Second Round	L 77–83 ^{OT}	23–12	18 – Bohannon	7 – Wieskamp	2 – Tied	Nationwide Arena (19,610); Columbus, OH
*Non-conference game. ^{#}Rankings from AP Poll. (#) Tournament seedings in parentheses. S=South. All times are in Central Time.

- Source: Schedule

== Rankings ==
Ranking movements Legend: ██ Increase in ranking ██ Decrease in ranking — = Not ranked RV = Received votes т = Tied with team above or below
	Week																			
Poll	Pre	1	2	3	4	5	6	7	8	9	10	11	12	13	14	15	16	17	18	Final
AP	—	—	20	14	18	22	23	24	25	RV	23	19	RV	20	21	21	22	—	—	Not released
Coaches	—	—	22	15	19	21	21	21	20-T	25	24	21	25	20	17	19	21	—	—	RV

^Coaches did not release a Week 1 poll.
*AP does not release post-NCAA Tournament rankings
