= 2018–19 Ohio State Buckeyes men's basketball team =

American college basketball season

2018–19 Ohio State Buckeyes men's basketball

NCAA tournament, Second Round
- Conference: Big Ten Conference
- Record: 20–15 (8–12 Big Ten)
- Head coach: Chris Holtmann (2nd season)
- Assistant coaches: Mike Schrage (2nd season); Ryan Pedon (2nd season); Terry Johnson (2nd season)
- Home arena: Value City Arena

2018–19 Big Ten Conference men's basketball standings
	Conf.				Overall
Team	W		L	PCT	W		L	PCT
No. 5 Michigan State †	16	–	4	.800	32	–	7	.821
No. 13 Purdue	16	–	4	.800	26	–	10	.722
No. 8 Michigan	15	–	5	.750	30	–	7	.811
No. 21 Wisconsin	14	–	6	.700	23	–	11	.676
Maryland	13	–	7	.650	23	–	11	.676
Iowa	10	–	10	.500	23	–	12	.657
Minnesota	9	–	11	.450	22	–	14	.611
Ohio State	8	–	12	.400	20	–	15	.571
Indiana	8	–	12	.400	19	–	16	.543
Penn State	7	–	13	.350	14	–	18	.438
Illinois	7	–	13	.350	12	–	21	.364
Rutgers	7	–	13	.350	14	–	17	.452
Nebraska	6	–	14	.300	19	–	17	.528
Northwestern	4	–	16	.200	13	–	19	.406
† 2019 Big Ten tournament winner Rankings from AP poll

The 2018–19 Ohio State Buckeyes men's basketball team represented Ohio State University in the 2018–19 NCAA Division I men's basketball season. Their head coach was Chris Holtmann, in his second season with the Buckeyes. The Buckeyes played their home games at Value City Arena in Columbus, Ohio as members of the Big Ten Conference. The Buckeyes finished the season 20–15, 8–12 in Big Ten play to finish in a tie for eighth place. As the No. 8 seed in the Big Ten tournament, they defeated Indiana in the second round before losing to Michigan State in the quarterfinals. They received an at-large bid to the NCAA tournament as the No. 11 seed in the Midwest region. There they upset Iowa State in the First Round before losing to Houston in the Second Round.

== Previous season ==
The Buckeyes finished the 2017–18 season 25–9, 15–3 in Big Ten play to finish in a tie for second place. As the No. 2 seed in the Big Ten tournament, they lost to Penn State in the quarterfinals. They received an at-large bid to the NCAA tournament as the No. 5 seed in the West region. They defeated South Dakota State in the First Round before losing to Gonzaga in the Second Round.

== Offseason ==
=== Departures ===
Name	Number	Pos.	Height	Weight	Year	Hometown	Reason for departure
Micah Potter	0	C	6'9"	240	Junior	Mentor, OH	Transferred to Wisconsin
Jae'Sean Tate	1	F	6'4"	230	Senior	Pickerington, OH	Graduated
Andrew Dakich	13	G	6'2"	190	Graduate Student	Zionsville, IN	Graduated
Kam Williams	15	G	6'2"	185	RS Senior	Baltimore, MD	Graduated
Keita Bates-Diop	33	F	6'7"	235	Junior	Normal, IL	Declared for 2018 NBA draft; selected 48th overall by the Minnesota Timberwolves
Matt Lehmann	43	G	6'4"	205	Junior	Columbus, OH	Graduated
Connor Fulton	45	G	6'4"	175	Freshman	Salt Lake City, UT	Professionalized in Japan

=== Incoming transfers ===
Name	Number	Pos.	Height	Weight	Year	Hometown	Previous School
CJ Walker	13	G	6'1"	195	Junior	Indianapolis, IN	Florida State
Keyshawn Woods	32	G	6'3"	205	Graduate Student	Gastonia, NC	Wake Forest

=== 2018 recruiting class ===
College recruiting information
Name	Hometown	School	Height	Weight	Commit date
Jaedon LeDee; SF	Houston, TX	The Kinkaid School	6 ft 7 in (2.01 m)	230 lb (100 kg)	Sep 19, 2017
Jaedon LeDee; SF	Recruit ratings: Scout: Rivals: 247Sports: ESPN:				
Duane Washington Jr. PG	Grand Rapids, MI	Sierra Canyon School	6 ft 3 in (1.91 m)	190 lb (86 kg)	Sep 20, 2017
Duane Washington Jr. PG	Recruit ratings: Scout: Rivals: 247Sports: ESPN:				
Luther Muhammad; SG	Jersey City, NJ	Hudson Catholic High School	6 ft 4 in (1.93 m)	185 lb (84 kg)	Sep 22, 2017
Luther Muhammad; SG	Recruit ratings: Scout: Rivals: 247Sports: ESPN:				
Justin Ahrens; SF	Versailles, OH	Versailles High School	6 ft 5 in (1.96 m)	181 lb (82 kg)	Sep 24, 2017
Justin Ahrens; SF	Recruit ratings: Scout: Rivals: 247Sports: ESPN:				
Overall recruit ranking:
Note: In many cases, Scout, Rivals, 247Sports, On3, and ESPN may conflict in their listings of height and weight.; In these cases, the average was taken. ESPN grades are on a 100-point scale.; Sources: "2018 Team Ranking". Rivals.

=== 2019 Recruiting class ===
College recruiting information (2019)
Name	Hometown	School	Height	Weight	Commit date
D. J. Carton #5 PG	Bettendorf, IA	Bettendorf High School	6 ft 1 in (1.85 m)	180 lb (82 kg)	Jul 14, 2018
D. J. Carton #5 PG	Recruit ratings: Scout: Rivals: 247Sports: ESPN:				
Alonzo Gaffney #5 SF	Cleveland, OH	Brewster Academy	6 ft 8 in (2.03 m)	185 lb (84 kg)	Apr 10, 2018
Alonzo Gaffney #5 SF	Recruit ratings: Scout: Rivals: 247Sports: ESPN:				
E. J. Liddell #8 PF	Belleville, IL	Belleville West	6 ft 6 in (1.98 m)	220 lb (100 kg)	Oct 1, 2018
E. J. Liddell #8 PF	Recruit ratings: Scout: Rivals: 247Sports: ESPN:				
Ibrahima Diallo; C	Napa, CA	Prolific Prep	7 ft 0 in (2.13 m)	200 lb (91 kg)	Apr 14, 2019
Ibrahima Diallo; C	Recruit ratings: Scout: Rivals: 247Sports: ESPN:				
Overall recruit ranking:
Note: In many cases, Scout, Rivals, 247Sports, On3, and ESPN may conflict in their listings of height and weight.; In these cases, the average was taken. ESPN grades are on a 100-point scale.; Sources: "2019 Team Ranking". Rivals.

== Roster ==
2018–19 Ohio State Buckeyes men's basketball team
Players
Coaches

Pos.	#	Name	Height	Weight	Year	Previous school	Hometown
G	1	Luther Muhammad	6 ft 3 in (1.91 m)	185 lb (84 kg)	Fr	Hudson Catholic Regional High School	Jersey City, New Jersey
G	2	Musa Jallow	6 ft 5 in (1.96 m)	200 lb (91 kg)	So	Bloomington High School North	Bloomington, Indiana
G	3	C. J. Jackson	6 ft 1 in (1.85 m)	175 lb (79 kg)	Sr	Eastern Florida State College	Charlotte, North Carolina
G	4	Duane Washington Jr.	6 ft 3 in (1.91 m)	190 lb (86 kg)	Fr	Sierra Canyon School	Grand Rapids, Michigan
F	10	Justin Ahrens	6 ft 5 in (1.96 m)	180 lb (82 kg)	Fr	Versailles High School	Versailles, Ohio
G	13	CJ Walker (redshirt)	6 ft 1 in (1.85 m)	195 lb (88 kg)	Jr	Florida State	Indianapolis, Indiana
G	14	Joey Lane (W)	6 ft 1 in (1.85 m)	180 lb (82 kg)	Sr	Deerfield High School	Deerfield, Illinois
F	23	Jaedon LeDee	6 ft 9 in (2.06 m)	230 lb (104 kg)	Fr	The Kinkaid School	Houston, Texas
F	24	Andre Wesson	6 ft 6 in (1.98 m)	220 lb (100 kg)	Jr	Westerville South High School	Westerville, Ohio
F	25	Kyle Young	6 ft 8 in (2.03 m)	205 lb (93 kg)	So	Jackson High School	Canton, Ohio
G	32	Keyshawn Woods	6 ft 3 in (1.91 m)	205 lb (93 kg)	GS	Wake Forest	Gastonia, North Carolina
F	34	Kaleb Wesson	6 ft 9 in (2.06 m)	270 lb (122 kg)	So	Westerville South High School	Westerville, Ohio
G	40	Daniel Hummer (W)	6 ft 0 in (1.83 m)	175 lb (79 kg)	RS Jr	Air Force	Upper Arlington, Ohio

Head coach

- Chris Holtmann (Taylor)

Assistant coach(es)

- Ryan Pedon (Wooster)
- Mike Schrage (Indiana)
- Terry Johnson (Purdue Fort Wayne)

Legend

- (C) Team captain
- (S) Suspended
- (I) Ineligible
- (W) Walk-on
- Injured
- Current redshirt

Roster

== Schedule and results ==
Date time, TV	Rank^{#}	Opponent^{#}	Result	Record	High points	High rebounds	High assists	Site (attendance) city, state
Exhibition
November 1, 2018*; 7:00 pm, BTN Plus		UNC Pembroke	W 81–63	–	13 – Potter	10 – K. Wesson	3 – Muhammad	Value City Arena (10,147); Columbus, OH
Regular season
November 7, 2018*; 6:00 pm, ESPN2		at Cincinnati	W 64–56	1–0	15 – K. Wesson	8 – Young	5 – Woods	Fifth Third Arena (12,012); Cincinnati, OH
November 11, 2018*; 4:00 pm, BTN		Purdue Fort Wayne; Buckeye Basketball Classic	W 107–61	2–0	25 – Jackson	7 – K. Wesson	5 – Jackson	Value City Arena (12,040); Columbus, OH
November 15, 2018*; 7:00 pm, FS1		at Creighton; Gavitt Tipoff Games	W 69–60	3–0	19 – Woods	6 – Young	4 – Woods	CHI Health Center Omaha (17,146); Omaha, NE
November 18, 2018*; 2:00 pm, BTN Plus		South Carolina State; Buckeye Basketball Classic	W 89–61	4–0	18 – K. Wesson	7 – Jallow	4 – Tied	Value City Arena (10,935); Columbus, OH
November 20, 2018*; 7:00 pm, BTN Plus	No. 23	Samford; Buckeye Basketball Classic	W 68–50	5–0	19 – K. Wesson	9 – Jackson	4 – Woods	Value City Arena (10,725); Columbus, OH
November 23, 2018*; 8:00 pm, FS1	No. 23	Cleveland State; Buckeye Basketball Classic	W 89–62	6–0	19 – K. Wesson	8 – LeDee	3 – Tied	St. John Arena (13,276); Columbus, OH
November 28, 2018*; 7:15 pm, ESPN2	No. 16	Syracuse; ACC–Big Ten Challenge	L 62–72	6–1	19 – Jackson	8 – K. Wesson	6 – Muhammad	Value City Arena (16,962); Columbus, OH
December 2, 2018; 7:00 pm, BTN	No. 16	Minnesota	W 79–59	7–1 (1–0)	16 – A. Wesson	8 – Young	4 – Jackson	Value City Arena (11,668); Columbus, OH
December 5, 2018; 7:00 pm, BTN	No. 19	vs. Illinois	W 77–67	8–1 (2–0)	18 – Woods	9 – Jallow	5 – Jackson	United Center (5,285); Chicago, IL
December 15, 2018*; 12:00 pm, BTN	No. 15	Bucknell	W 73–71	9–1	22 – K. Wesson	10 – K. Wesson	6 – Jackson	Value City Arena (14,241); Columbus, OH
December 18, 2018*; 7:00 pm, BTN	No. 15	Youngstown State	W 75–56	10–1	31 – K. Wesson	7 – Tied	7 – Jackson	Value City Arena (12,637); Columbus, OH
December 22, 2018*; 3:00 pm, CBS	No. 15	vs. UCLA; CBS Sports Classic	W 80–66	11–1	22 – Jackson	12 – K. Wesson	10 – Woods	United Center (15,124); Chicago, IL
December 29, 2018*; 12:00 pm, BTN	No. 13	High Point	W 82–64	12–1	20 – Jackson	9 – A. Wesson	4 – Tied	Value City Arena (14,264); Columbus, OH
January 5, 2019; 12:00 pm, FOX	No. 14	No. 8 Michigan State	L 77–86	12–2 (2–1)	25 – K. Wesson	8 – K. Wesson	5 – Jackson	Value City Arena (18,809); Columbus, OH
January 9, 2019; 7:00 pm, BTN	No. 16	at Rutgers	L 61–64	12–3 (2–2)	18 – K. Wesson	7 – K. Wesson	4 – Jackson	Louis Brown Athletic Center (5,379); Piscataway, NJ
January 12, 2019; 2:30 pm, BTN	No. 16	at Iowa	L 62–72	12–4 (2–3)	13 – A. Wesson	6 – K. Wesson	4 – A. Wesson	Carver–Hawkeye Arena (14,528); Iowa City, IA
January 18, 2019; 6:30 pm, FS1		No. 19 Maryland	L 61–75	12–5 (2–4)	15 – Jackson	6 – K. Wesson	3 – K. Wesson	Value City Arena (14,716); Columbus, OH
January 23, 2019; 7:00 pm, BTN		Purdue	L 67–79	12–6 (2–5)	22 – A. Wesson	6 – Jallow	3 – Jackson	Value City Arena (12,736); Columbus, OH
January 26, 2019; 12:00 pm, FS1		at Nebraska	W 70–60	13–6 (3–5)	24 – Muhammad	11 – Wesson	4 – Jackson	Pinnacle Bank Arena (15,890); Lincoln, NE
January 29, 2019; 9:00 pm, ESPN2		at No. 5 Michigan	L 49–65	13–7 (3–6)	12 – K. Wesson	8 – Jackson	4 – Jackson	Crisler Center (12,707); Ann Arbor, MI
February 2, 2019; 12:00 pm, BTN		Rutgers	W 76–62	14–7 (4–6)	27 – K. Wesson	7 – Jackson	5 – K. Wesson	Value City Arena (14,961); Columbus, OH
February 7, 2019; 7:00 pm, ESPN		Penn State	W 74–70	15–7 (5–6)	20 – Muhammad	10 – K. Wesson	4 – Muhammad	Value City Arena (15,824); Columbus, OH
February 10, 2019; 1:00 pm, CBS		at Indiana	W 55–52	16–7 (6–6)	15 – A. Wesson	6 – Jallow	4 – Jackson	Simon Skjodt Assembly Hall (17,222); Bloomington, IN
February 14, 2019; 7:00 pm, ESPN2		Illinois	L 56–63	16–8 (6–7)	17 – Jackson	5 – Jackson	3 – Woods	Value City Arena (12,420); Columbus, OH
February 17, 2019; 1:00 pm, CBS		at No. 11 Michigan State	L 44–62	16–9 (6–8)	12 – A. Wesson	9 – K. Wesson	4 – A. Wesson	Breslin Center (14,797); East Lansing, MI
February 20, 2019; 8:30 pm, BTN		Northwestern	W 63–49	17–9 (7–8)	22 – K. Wesson	8 – K. Wesson	4 – K. Wesson	Value City Arena (12,032); Columbus, OH
February 23, 2019; 2:00 pm, ESPN		at No. 24 Maryland	L 62–72	17–10 (7–9)	15 – Washington	7 – K. Wesson	4 – Tied	Xfinity Center (17,569); College Park, MD
February 26, 2019; 7:00 pm, BTN		No. 22 Iowa	W 90–70	18–10 (8–9)	29 – Ahrens	11 – K. Wesson	6 – Jackson	Value City Arena (14,118); Columbus, OH
March 2, 2019; 2:00 pm, ESPN		at No. 14 Purdue	L 51–86	18–11 (8–10)	16 – LeDee	8 – Young	3 – A. Wesson	Mackey Arena (14,804); West Lafayette, IN
March 6, 2019; 9:00 pm, BTN		at Northwestern	L 50–68	18–12 (8–11)	15 – Woods	7 – Woods	2 – Jackson	Welsh–Ryan Arena (6,534); Evanston, IN
March 10, 2019; 4:30 pm, CBS		No. 21 Wisconsin	L 67–73 ^{OT}	18–13 (8–12)	22 – Jackson	8 – Young	5 – Jackson	Value City Arena (18,231); Columbus, OH
Big Ten tournament
March 14, 2019; 12:30 pm, BTN	(8)	vs. (9) Indiana; Second Round	W 79–75	19–13	18 – Woods	13 – K Wesson	5 – Jackson	United Center (16,207); Chicago, IL
March 15, 2019; 12:30 pm, BTN	(8)	vs. (1) No. 6 Michigan State; Quarterfinals	L 70–77	19–14	16 – Woods	3 – Tied	5 – Jackson	United Center (17,369); Chicago, IL
NCAA tournament
March 22, 2019*; 9:50 pm, TBS	(11 MW)	vs. (6 MW) No. 24 Iowa State; First Round	W 62–59	20–14	21 – K. Wesson	12 – K. Wesson	2 – Tied	BOK Center (12,443); Tulsa, OK
March 24, 2019*; 8:40 pm, TNT	(11 MW)	vs. (3 MW) No. 11 Houston; Second Round	L 59–74	20–15	18 – Jackson	6 – Tied	4 – Woods	BOK Center (12,606); Tulsa, OK
*Non-conference game. ^{#}Rankings from AP Poll. (#) Tournament seedings in parentheses. MW=Midwest. All times are in Eastern Time.

== Rankings ==
Ranking movements Legend: ██ Increase in ranking ██ Decrease in ranking — = Not ranked RV = Received votes т = Tied with team above or below
	Week																			
Poll	Pre	1	2	3	4	5	6	7	8	9	10	11	12	13	14	15	16	17	18	Final
AP	—	RV	23	16	19	15	15	13	14	16	RV	—	—	—	—	—	—	—	—	Not released
Coaches	—	—	23	16	17	14	14	11-T	12	17	RV	RV	—	—	—	—	—	—	—	RV

^Coaches Poll did not release a Week 2 poll at the same time AP did.

*AP does not release post-NCAA Tournament rankings

== See also ==
2018–19 Ohio State Buckeyes women's basketball team
