= 2018–19 Illinois Fighting Illini men's basketball team =

American college basketball season

2018–19 Illinois Fighting Illini men's basketball
- Conference: Big Ten Conference
- Record: 12–21 (7–13 Big Ten)
- Head coach: Brad Underwood (2nd season)
- Assistant coaches: Orlando Antigua (2nd season); Jamall Walker (7th season); Ron Coleman (2nd season)
- MVPs: Giorgi Bezhanishvili; Ayo Dosunmu
- Captain: Aaron Jordan
- Home arena: State Farm Center

2018–19 Big Ten Conference men's basketball standings
	Conf.				Overall
Team	W		L	PCT	W		L	PCT
No. 5 Michigan State †	16	–	4	.800	32	–	7	.821
No. 13 Purdue	16	–	4	.800	26	–	10	.722
No. 8 Michigan	15	–	5	.750	30	–	7	.811
No. 21 Wisconsin	14	–	6	.700	23	–	11	.676
Maryland	13	–	7	.650	23	–	11	.676
Iowa	10	–	10	.500	23	–	12	.657
Minnesota	9	–	11	.450	22	–	14	.611
Ohio State	8	–	12	.400	20	–	15	.571
Indiana	8	–	12	.400	19	–	16	.543
Penn State	7	–	13	.350	14	–	18	.438
Illinois	7	–	13	.350	12	–	21	.364
Rutgers	7	–	13	.350	14	–	17	.452
Nebraska	6	–	14	.300	19	–	17	.528
Northwestern	4	–	16	.200	13	–	19	.406
† 2019 Big Ten tournament winner Rankings from AP poll

The 2018–19 Illinois Fighting Illini men's basketball team represented the University of Illinois at Urbana–Champaign in the 2018–19 NCAA Division I men's basketball season. Led by second-year head coach Brad Underwood, the Illini played their home games at State Farm Center in Champaign, Illinois as members of the Big Ten Conference. The Illini finished the season 12–21, 7–13 in Big Ten play, to finish in a three-way tie for 10th place. Due to tie-breaking rules, they received the No. 11 seed in the Big Ten tournament where they defeated Northwestern in the first round before losing to Iowa in the second round.

== Previous season ==
The Illini finished the 2017–18 season 14–18, 4–14 in Big Ten play to finish in a three-way tie for 11th place. As the No. 13 seed in the Big Ten tournament, they lost in the first round to Iowa.

== Offseason ==
=== Player departures ===
On March 5, 2018 Mark Smith announced his decision to transfer to a new school, indicating he did not fit into Illinois' system moving forward. On March 15, Leron Black announced his decision to forgoing final year of eligibility to declare for the NBA draft after already graduating with his bachelor's degree. He intended to sign with an agent, ending his collegiate career. On March 26, Te'Jon Lucas and Michael Finke both announced they would transfer to other programs. Lucas announced he would transfer to Milwaukee to complete his two years of remaining eligibility after sitting out for a season. Finke announced he will transfer to Grand Canyon and have one year of immediate eligibility as a graduate transfer. In late April, Matic Vessel left the program and returned to his home country of Slovenia to explore his options to continue basketball. On June 7, 2018 Greg Eboigbodin announced his intent to transfer out of Illinois, which left Illinois with four returning scholarship players from the prior season. Eboigbodin announced on July 30, 2018 that he would transfer to Northeastern University.

Name	Number	Pos.	Height	Weight	Year	Hometown	Notes
Te'Jon Lucas	3	G	6'0"	170	Sophomore	Milwaukee, Wisconsin	Transferred to Milwaukee
Matic Vessel	4	F	6'10"	215	Freshman	Ljubljana, Slovenia	Left team
Greg Eboigbodin	11	F	6'9"	220	Freshman	Benin City, Nigeria	Transferred to Northeastern
Leron Black	12	F	6'7"	220	Redshirt Junior	Memphis, Tennessee	Graduated
Mark Smith	13	G	6'5"	225	Freshman	Edwardsville, Illinois	Transferred to Missouri
Mark Alstork	24	G	6'5"	190	Graduate student	Dayton, Ohio	Graduated
Clayton Jones	41	G	6'0"	170	Redshirt Senior	Champaign, Illinois	Graduated
Michael Finke	43	F	6'10"	230	Redshirt Junior	Champaign, Illinois	Transferred to Grand Canyon
Cameron Liss	45	F	6'6"	220	Redshirt Junior	Northbrook, Illinois	Graduated

=== 2018 recruiting class ===
In October 2017, five-star point guard Ayo Dosunmu verbally committed to Illinois over Wake Forest at the flagship Jordan Brand Store on State Street in the Chicago Loop. Dosunmu signed his National Letter of Intent in November 2017 to attend Illinois. In March 2018, Dosunmu was named one of 26 high school seniors who will participate in the Jordan Brand Classic on April 8, 2018, at the Barclays Center in Brooklyn, New York. Dosunmu is the third Illini to be selected to play in the Jordan Classic, joining Dee Brown who played for the Red team in 2002 and Jalen Coleman-Lands who played in 2015. Dosunmu was also selected to play in the second annual Iverson Roundball Classic All-American Game that took place in April 2018 at Souderton Area High School outside of Philadelphia, Pennsylvania.

College recruiting
Name	Hometown	School	Height	Weight	Commit date
Giorgi Bezhanishvili; PF	Vienna, Austria	St. Patrick High School (NJ)	6 ft 9 in (2.06 m)	230 lb (100 kg)	Mar 26, 2018
Giorgi Bezhanishvili; PF	Recruit ratings: Rivals: 247Sports: ESPN: (74)				
Ayo Dosunmu; PG	Chicago, IL	Morgan Park High School	6 ft 4 in (1.93 m)	172 lb (78 kg)	Oct 19, 2017
Ayo Dosunmu; PG	Recruit ratings: Rivals: 247Sports: ESPN: (89)				
Andrés Feliz; PG	Santo Domingo, Dominican Republic	West Oaks Academy/Northwest Florida State College	6 ft 2 in (1.88 m)	180 lb (82 kg)	Apr 8, 2018
Andrés Feliz; PG	Recruit ratings: Rivals: 247Sports:				
Alan Griffin; SG	White Plains, NY	Oak Park and River Forest HS/Archbishop Stepinac HS	6 ft 5 in (1.96 m)	200 lb (91 kg)	Mar 2, 2018
Alan Griffin; SG	Recruit ratings: Rivals: 247Sports: ESPN: (75)				
Anthony Higgs; SF	Baltimore, MD	Perry Hall High School	6 ft 8 in (2.03 m)	200 lb (91 kg)	Jun 26, 2018
Anthony Higgs; SF	Recruit ratings: Rivals: 247Sports:				
Tevian Jones; SF	Culver City, CA	Culver City High School	6 ft 6 in (1.98 m)	200 lb (91 kg)	Apr 3, 2018
Tevian Jones; SF	Recruit ratings: Rivals: 247Sports: ESPN: (80)				
Samba Kane; C	Dakar, Senegal	Regis Jesuit High School/Florida Preparatory Academy	6 ft 11 in (2.11 m)	215 lb (98 kg)	Mar 9, 2018
Samba Kane; C	Recruit ratings: Rivals: 247Sports: ESPN: (83)				
Overall recruit ranking: Rivals: 11 247Sports: 24 On3: 24
Note: In many cases, Scout, Rivals, 247Sports, On3, and ESPN may conflict in their listings of height and weight.; In these cases, the average was taken. ESPN grades are on a 100-point scale.; Sources: "Illinois 2018 Basketball Commitments". Rivals.; "ESPN Recruiting Nation Basketball". ESPN.; "2018 Team Ranking". Rivals.; "Illinois 2018 Basketball Commits". 247Sports.; "2018–19 Illinois Fighting Illini men's basketball team". On3.

== Roster ==
2018–19 Illinois Fighting Illini men's basketball team
Players
Coaches

Pos.	#	Name	Height	Weight	Year	Previous school	Hometown
G	0	Alan Griffin	6 ft 5 in (1.96 m)	180 lb (82 kg)	Fr	Oak Park and River Forest HS/Archbishop Stepinac HS	White Plains, New York
G	1	Trent Frazier	6 ft 2 in (1.88 m)	170 lb (77 kg)	So	Wellington High School (FL)	West Palm Beach, Florida
F	2	Kipper Nichols	6 ft 6 in (1.98 m)	225 lb (102 kg)	RS Jr	St. Edward High School (OH)	Cleveland, Ohio
G	3	Drew Cayce (W)	6 ft 1 in (1.85 m)	175 lb (79 kg)	RS Jr	La Lumiere School/Creighton	Libertyville, Illinois
F	4	Zach Griffith (W)	6 ft 6 in (1.98 m)	210 lb (95 kg)	So	Fisher High School	Fisher, Illinois
F	5	Tevian Jones	6 ft 7 in (2.01 m)	200 lb (91 kg)	Fr	Culver City High School	Culver City, California
G	10	Andrés Feliz	6 ft 2 in (1.88 m)	185 lb (84 kg)	Jr	West Oaks Academy/Northwest Florida State	Santo Domingo, Dominican Republic
G	11	Ayo Dosunmu	6 ft 5 in (1.96 m)	185 lb (84 kg)	Fr	Morgan Park High School	Chicago, Illinois
C	12	Adonis De La Rosa	7 ft 0 in (2.13 m)	265 lb (120 kg)	GS	Christ the King HS/Kent State	Bronx, NY
F	15	Giorgi Bezhanishvili	6 ft 9 in (2.06 m)	230 lb (104 kg)	Fr	St. Patrick High School	Vienna, Austria
G	20	Da'Monte Williams	6 ft 3 in (1.91 m)	190 lb (86 kg)	So	Manual High School	Peoria, Illinois
F	22	Anthony Higgs (injured) (redshirt)	6 ft 8 in (2.03 m)	215 lb (98 kg)	Fr	Perry Hall High School	Baltimore, Maryland
G	23	Aaron Jordan (C)	6 ft 5 in (1.96 m)	210 lb (95 kg)	Sr	Plainfield East High School	Plainfield, Illinois
G	32	Tyler Underwood (W)	6 ft 2 in (1.88 m)	180 lb (82 kg)	RS Jr	Nacogdoches High School / Oklahoma State	Nacogdoches, Texas
C	34	Samba Kane	7 ft 0 in (2.13 m)	220 lb (100 kg)	Fr	Regis Jesuit High School/Florida Preparatory Academy	Dakar, Senegal
G	35	Samson Oladimeji (W)	6 ft 4 in (1.93 m)	200 lb (91 kg)	Jr	William Fremd High School	Rolling Meadows, Illinois

Head coach

- Brad Underwood (Kansas State)

Assistant coach(es)

- Orlando Antigua (Pittsburgh)
- Jamall Walker (Saint Louis)
- Ron Coleman (Lamar)

Legend

- (C) Team captain
- (S) Suspended
- (I) Ineligible
- (W) Walk-on
- Injured
- Current redshirt

Roster
Last update: June 22, 2018

== Schedule and results ==
The season marked the first time in Big Ten history that the teams would play a 20-game conference schedule, setting a precedent for all Division I basketball. The new schedule includes a regional component to increase the frequency of games among teams in similar areas. Over the course of a six-year cycle (12 playing opportunities), in-state rivals will play each other 12 times, regional opponents will play 10 times, and all other teams will play nine times. Three in-state series are guaranteed home-and-homes: Illinois and Northwestern, Indiana and Purdue, and Michigan and Michigan State will always play twice.

Date time, TV	Rank^{#}	Opponent^{#}	Result	Record	High points	High rebounds	High assists	Site (attendance) city, state
Exhibition
November 2, 2018*; 7:00 pm, BTN Plus		Illinois Wesleyan	W 83–67	–	20 – Feliz	7 – Jordan	5 – Frazier	State Farm Center (13,349); Champaign, IL
Regular season
November 8, 2018*; 7:00 pm, BTN Plus		Evansville; Maui on the Mainland	W 99–60	1–0	19 – Jordan	10 – Bezhanishvili	7 – Frazier	State Farm Center (11,755); Champaign, IL
November 13, 2018*; 7:40 pm, FS1		Georgetown; Gavitt Tipoff Games	L 80–88	1–1	25 – Dosunmu	5 – Feliz	5 – Feliz	State Farm Center (14,656); Champaign, IL
November 19, 2018*; 10:30 pm, ESPN2		vs. No. 3 Gonzaga; Maui Invitational Tournament quarterfinals	L 78–84	1–2	29 – Frazier	10 – Jordan	3 – Tied	Lahaina Civic Center (2,400); Lahaina, HI
November 20, 2018*; 3:30 pm, ESPN2		vs. Iowa State; Maui Invitational Tournament	L 68–84	1–3	15 – Frazier	7 – De La Rosa	3 – Frazier	Lahaina Civic Center (2,400); Lahaina, HI
November 21, 2018*; 8:00 pm, ESPNU		vs. Xavier; Maui Invitational Tournament	L 74–83	1–4	19 – Dosunmu	6 – De La Rosa	4 – Jordan	Lahaina Civic Center (2,400); Lahaina, HI
November 25, 2018*; 1:00 pm, BTN Plus		Mississippi Valley State	W 86–67	2–4	16 – Frazier	9 – Dosunmu	9 – Dosunmu	State Farm Center (11,706); Champaign, IL
November 27, 2018*; 6:00 pm, ESPNU		at Notre Dame; ACC–Big Ten Challenge	L 74–76	2–5	23 – Jordan	9 – Dosunmu	6 – Feliz	Edmund P. Joyce Center (8,053); Notre Dame, IN
December 2, 2018; 4:00 pm, BTN		at Nebraska	L 60–75	2–6 (0–1)	14 – Bezhanishvili	6 – Bezhanishvili	4 – Frazier	Pinnacle Bank Arena (15,764); Lincoln, NE
December 5, 2018; 6:00 pm, BTN		vs. No. 19 Ohio State	L 67–77	2–7 (0–2)	18 – Tied	6 – Williams	4 – Dosunmu	United Center (5,285); Chicago, IL
December 8, 2018*; 1:00 pm, BTN		UNLV	W 77–74	3–7	19 – Feliz	7 – Jordan	3 – Dosunmu	State Farm Center (12,268); Champaign, IL
December 15, 2018*; 1:00 pm, BTN Plus		East Tennessee State	W 77–53	4–7	25 – Frazier	10 – Jordan	5 – Frazier	State Farm Center (12,379); Champaign, IL
December 22, 2018*; 7:00 pm, BTN		vs. Missouri; Braggin' Rights	L 63–79	4–8	28 – Frazier	7 – Bezhanishvili	2 – Bezhanishvili	Enterprise Center (16,397); St. Louis, MO
December 29, 2018*; 2:00 pm, BTN Plus		Florida Atlantic	L 71–73 ^{OT}	4–9	21 – Dosunmu	8 – Tied	4 – Tied	State Farm Center (12,539); Champaign, IL
January 3, 2019; 6:00 pm, FS1		at No. 21 Indiana; Rivalry	L 65–73	4–10 (0–3)	20 – Dosunmu	7 – Bezhanishvili	6 – Frazier	Simon Skjodt Assembly Hall (14,832); Bloomington, IN
January 6, 2019; 12:00 pm, BTN		at Northwestern; Rivalry	L 66–68	4–11 (0–4)	18 – Dosunmu	6 – Nichols	3 – Tied	Welsh-Ryan Arena (7,039); Evanston, IL
January 10, 2019; 7:00 pm, FS1		No. 2 Michigan	L 69–79	4–12 (0–5)	23 – Dosunmu	7 – Dosunmu	4 – Nichols	State Farm Center (10,770); Champaign, IL
January 16, 2019; 8:00 pm, BTN		Minnesota	W 95–68	5–12 (1–5)	23 – Dosunmu	8 – Bezhanishvili	2 – Tied	State Farm Center (11,503); Champaign, IL
January 20, 2019; 12:00 pm, BTN		at No. 23 Iowa; Rivalry	L 71–95	5–13 (1–6)	15 – Dosunmu	7 – Bezhanishvili	6 – Dosunmu	Carver–Hawkeye Arena (13,589); Iowa City, IA
January 23, 2019; 8:00 pm, BTN		Wisconsin	L 60–72	5–14 (1–7)	20 – Bezhanishvili	8 – Bezhanishvili	4 – Dosunmu	State Farm Center (12,294); Champaign, IL
January 26, 2019; 11:00 am, BTN		vs. No. 13 Maryland; B1G Super Saturday	W 78–67	6–14 (2–7)	20 – Dosunmu	6 – Tied	6 – Dosunmu	Madison Square Garden (7,239); New York, NY
January 30, 2019; 8:00 pm, BTN		at Minnesota	L 75–86	6–15 (2–8)	30 – Frazier	6 – Dosunmu	4 – Dosunmu	Williams Arena (9,565); Minneapolis, MN
February 2, 2019; 1:15 pm, BTN		Nebraska	W 71–64	7–15 (3–8)	18 – Nichols	6 – Nichols	2 – Tied	State Farm Center (13,588); Champaign, IL
February 5, 2019; 6:00 pm, ESPN2		No. 9 Michigan State	W 79–74	8–15 (4–8)	24 – Dosunmu	5 – Bezhanishvili	3 – Frazier	State Farm Center (12,960); Champaign, IL
February 9, 2019; 3:00 pm, BTN		Rutgers	W 99–94 ^{OT}	9–15 (5–8)	35 – Bezhanishvili	7 – Bezhanishvili	6 – Dosunmu	State Farm Center (14,099); Champaign, IL
February 14, 2019; 6:00 pm, ESPN2		at Ohio State	W 63-56	10–15 (6–8)	15 – Tied	7 – Bezhanishvili	3 – Tied	Value City Arena (12,420); Columbus, OH
February 18, 2019; 7:00 pm, FS1		at No. 22 Wisconsin	L 58–64	10–16 (6–9)	13 – Dosunmu	6 – Tied	3 – Dosunmu	Kohl Center (17,152); Madison, WI
February 23, 2019; 11:00 am, BTN		Penn State	L 76–83	10–17 (6–10)	18 – Dosunmu	10 – Bezhanishvili	3 – Dosunmu	State Farm Center (15,544); Champaign, IL
February 27, 2019; 7:30 pm, BTN		at No. 14 Purdue	L 56–73	10–18 (6–11)	9 – Tied	6 – Jordan	3 – Williams	Mackey Arena (14,804); West Lafayette, IN
March 3, 2019; 5:30 pm, BTN		Northwestern; Rivalry	W 81–76	11–18 (7–11)	26 – Feliz	10 – Jordan	5 – Dosunmu	State Farm Center (13,924); Champaign, IL
March 7, 2019; 7:00 pm, FS1		Indiana; Rivalry	L 74–92	11–19 (7–12)	16 – Dosunmu	8 – Bezhanishvili	3 – Tied	State Farm Center (14,033); Champaign, IL
March 10, 2019; 11:00 am, FS1		at Penn State	L 56-72	11–20 (7–13)	16 – Tied	8 – Dosunmu	2 – Tied	Bryce Jordan Center (9,678); University Park, PA
Big Ten tournament
March 13, 2019; 8:00 pm, BTN	(11)	vs. (14) Northwestern; First round	W 74–69 ^{OT}	12–20	26 – Bezhanishvili	10 – Feliz	6 – Feliz	United Center (16,473); Chicago, IL
March 14, 2019; 8:30 pm, BTN	(11)	vs. (6) Iowa; Second round	L 62–83	12–21	12 – Bezhanishvili	6 – Bezhanishvili	6 – Dosunmu	United Center; Chicago, IL
*Non-conference game. ^{#}Rankings from AP Poll. (#) Tournament seedings in parentheses. All times are in Central Time.
