= 2018–19 Iowa State Cyclones men's basketball team =

American college basketball season

2018–19 Iowa State Cyclones men's basketball

Big 12 tournament champions

NCAA tournament, First Round
- Conference: Big 12 Conference

Ranking
- Coaches: No. 25
- AP: No. 24
- Record: 23–12 (9–9 Big 12)
- Head coach: Steve Prohm (4th season)
- Assistant coaches: James Kane; Daniyal Robinson; William Small
- Home arena: Hilton Coliseum

2018–19 Big 12 men's basketball standings
	Conf.				Overall
Team	W		L	PCT	W		L	PCT
No. 19 Kansas State	14	–	4	.778	25	–	9	.735
No. 2 Texas Tech	14	–	4	.778	31	–	7	.816
No. 16 Kansas	12	–	6	.667	26	–	10	.722
Baylor	10	–	8	.556	20	–	14	.588
No. 25 Iowa State †	9	–	9	.500	23	–	12	.657
Texas	8	–	10	.444	21	–	16	.568
Oklahoma	7	–	11	.389	20	–	14	.588
TCU	7	–	11	.389	23	–	14	.622
Oklahoma State	5	–	13	.278	12	–	20	.375
West Virginia	4	–	14	.222	15	–	21	.417
† 2019 Big 12 tournament winner Rankings from AP Poll

The 2018–19 Iowa State Cyclones men's basketball team represented Iowa State University during the 2018–19 NCAA Division I men's basketball season. The Cyclones were coached by Steve Prohm, who was in his fourth season at Iowa State. They played their home games at Hilton Coliseum in Ames, Iowa as members of the Big 12 Conference. They finished the season 23–12, finishing in 5th place. In the Big 12 tournament, they defeated Baylor, Kansas State and Kansas to win the Big 12 championship. They received an automatic bid as a 6th seed in the NCAA tournament where they were upset by 11th seed Ohio State in the first round.

== Previous season ==
The Cyclones finished the 2017–18 season 13–18, 4–14 in Big 12 play, to finish in last place. They lost in the first round of the Big 12 tournament to Texas.

== Offseason ==
=== Departures ===
Name	Number	Pos.	Height	Weight	Year	Hometown	Reason for departure
Donovan Jackson	4	G	6'2"	175	Senior	Milwaukee	Graduated
Jakolby Long	13	G	6'5"	207	Sophomore	Mustang, Oklahoma	Transferred to Southern Utah
Hans Brase	30	F	6'9"	235	RS senior	Clover, South Carolina	Graduated; signed with Mitteldeutscher BC
Jeff Beverly	55	F	6'6"	250	RS senior	League City, Texas	Graduated

=== Incoming transfers ===
Name	Number	Pos.	Height	Weight	Year	Hometown	Previous school
Prentiss Nixon	13	G	6'1"	180	Senior	Bolingbrook, Illinois	Colorado State

=== 2018 recruiting class ===
College recruiting
Name	Hometown	School	Height	Weight	Commit date
Talen Horton-Tucker #17 SF	Chicago	Simeon Career Academy	6 ft 5 in (1.96 m)	210 lb (95 kg)	Oct 26, 2017
Talen Horton-Tucker #17 SF	Recruit ratings: Scout: Rivals: 247Sports: ESPN: (84)				
Zion Griffin #42 SF	Darien, Illinois	Hinsdale South High School	6 ft 6 in (1.98 m)	208 lb (94 kg)	Sep 12, 2017
Zion Griffin #42 SF	Recruit ratings: Scout: Rivals: 247Sports: ESPN: (80)				
Tyrese Haliburton #51 PG	Oshkosh, Wisconsin	North High School	6 ft 5 in (1.96 m)	170 lb (77 kg)	Sep 18, 2017
Tyrese Haliburton #51 PG	Recruit ratings: Scout: Rivals: 247Sports: ESPN: (78)				
George Conditt IV #45 PF	Chicago	Corliss High School	6 ft 10 in (2.08 m)	200 lb (91 kg)	Oct 2, 2017
George Conditt IV #45 PF	Recruit ratings: Scout: Rivals: 247Sports: ESPN: (77)				
Overall recruit ranking:
Note: In many cases, Scout, Rivals, 247Sports, On3, and ESPN may conflict in their listings of height and weight.; In these cases, the average was taken. ESPN grades are on a 100-point scale.; Sources: "2018 Team Ranking". Rivals.

== Future recruits ==
=== 2019–20 team recruits ===
College recruiting (2019)
Name	Hometown	School	Height	Weight	Commit date
Tre Jackson #22 PG	Blythewood, South Carolina	Blythewood High School	6 ft 1 in (1.85 m)	170 lb (77 kg)	Sep 25, 2018
Tre Jackson #22 PG	Recruit ratings: Scout: Rivals: 247Sports: ESPN: (NR)				
Luke Anderson #26 PF	Lakeland, Florida	Lakeland High School	6 ft 7 in (2.01 m)	228 lb (103 kg)	Sep 2, 2018
Luke Anderson #26 PF	Recruit ratings: Scout: Rivals: 247Sports: ESPN: (80)				
Marcedus Leech #40 SG	Poplar Bluff, Missouri	Poplar Bluff High School	6 ft 4 in (1.93 m)	170 lb (77 kg)	Jul 25, 2018
Marcedus Leech #40 SG	Recruit ratings: Scout: Rivals: 247Sports: ESPN: (78)				
Overall recruit ranking:
Note: In many cases, Scout, Rivals, 247Sports, On3, and ESPN may conflict in their listings of height and weight.; In these cases, the average was taken. ESPN grades are on a 100-point scale.; Sources: "2019 Team Ranking". Rivals.

== Roster ==
2018–19 Iowa State Cyclones men's basketball team
Players
Coaches

Pos.	#	Name	Height	Weight	Year	Previous school	Hometown
F	0	Zion Griffin	6 ft 6 in (1.98 m)	205 lb (93 kg)	Fr	Hinsdale South	Darien, Illinois
G	1	Nick Weiler-Babb	6 ft 5 in (1.96 m)	205 lb (93 kg)	RS Sr	James Martin; Arkansas	Arlington, Texas
F	2	Cameron Lard	6 ft 9 in (2.06 m)	245 lb (111 kg)	RS So	Pro Vision Academy	Natchitoches, Louisiana
G	3	Marial Shayok	6 ft 6 in (1.98 m)	198 lb (90 kg)	RS Sr	Blair Academy; Virginia	Blairstown, New Jersey
F	4	George Conditt IV	6 ft 10 in (2.08 m)	216 lb (98 kg)	Fr	Corliss	Chicago
G	5	Lindell Wigginton	6 ft 2 in (1.88 m)	189 lb (86 kg)	So	Oak Hill	Dartmouth, NS
G	10	Nate Schuster (W)	6 ft 4 in (1.93 m)	185 lb (84 kg)	Fr	Menomonee Falls	Menomonee Falls, Wisconsin
G	11	Talen Horton-Tucker	6 ft 4 in (1.93 m)	233 lb (106 kg)	Fr	Simeon	Chicago
F	12	Michael Jacobson	6 ft 9 in (2.06 m)	230 lb (104 kg)	RS Jr	Waukee; Nebraska	Waukee, Iowa
G	13	Prentiss Nixon (redshirt)	6 ft 2 in (1.88 m)	189 lb (86 kg)	Sr	Bolingbrook; Colorado State	Bolingbrook, Illinois
G	15	Carter Boothe (W)	6 ft 0 in (1.83 m)	193 lb (88 kg)	Fr	Central Decatur	Leon, Iowa
G	22	Tyrese Haliburton	6 ft 5 in (1.96 m)	172 lb (78 kg)	Fr	North	Oshkosh, Wisconsin
F	23	Zoran Talley Jr.	6 ft 7 in (2.01 m)	198 lb (90 kg)	RS Sr	Merrillville; Old Dominion	Merrillville, Indiana
G	24	Terrence Lewis	6 ft 6 in (1.98 m)	203 lb (92 kg)	So	Riverside	Milwaukee, Wisconsin
G	25	Eric Steyer (W)	6 ft 5 in (1.96 m)	170 lb (77 kg)	RS Fr	Ames	Ames, Iowa
F	33	Solomon Young (injured) (redshirt)	6 ft 8 in (2.03 m)	243 lb (110 kg)	Jr	Sacramento	Sacramento, California

Head coach

- Steve Prohm (Alabama)

Assistant coach(es)

- James Kane (Florida)
- Daniyal Robinson (Little Rock)
- William Small (Belhaven)

Legend

- (C) Team captain
- (S) Suspended
- (I) Ineligible
- (W) Walk-on
- Injured
- Current redshirt

Roster
Last update: July 17, 2024

== Schedule and results ==
Date time, TV	Rank^{#}	Opponent^{#}	Result	Record	High points	High rebounds	High assists	Site (attendance) city, state
Regular season
November 6, 2018*; 7:00 p.m., Cyclones.tv		Alabama State	W 79–53	1–0	17 – Jacobson	7 – Jacobson	4 – tied	Hilton Coliseum (13,696); Ames, Iowa
November 9, 2018*; 6:00 p.m., Cyclones.tv		Missouri	W 76–59	2–0	20 – Shayok	6 – Jacobson	6 – Weiler-Babb	Hilton Coliseum (14,384); Ames, Iowa
November 12, 2018*; 7:00 p.m., Cyclones.tv		Texas Southern; Maui Invitational campus-site game	W 85–73	3–0	26 – tied	13 – Weiler-Babb	5 – Weiler-Babb	Hilton Coliseum (13,787); Ames, Iowa
November 19, 2018*; 8:00 p.m., ESPNU		vs. Arizona; Maui Invitational quarterfinals	L 66–71	3–1	19 – Shayok	14 – Shayok	5 – Hailburton	Lahaina Civic Center (2,400); Maui, HI
November 20, 2018*; 4:00 p.m., ESPN2		vs. Illinois; Maui Invitational consolation semifinals	W 84–68	4–1	26 – Horton-Tucker	14 – Horton-Tucker	6 – Horton-Tucker	Lahaina Civic Center (2,400); Maui, HI
November 21, 2018*; 1:30 p.m., ESPN2		vs. San Diego State; Maui Invitational 5th-place game	W 87–57	5–1	21 – Shayok	8 – tied	6 – Weiler-Babb	Lahaina Civic Center (2,400); Maui, HI
November 26, 2018*; 7:00 p.m., Cyclones.tv		Omaha	W 82–55	6–1	18 – Shayok	10 – Jacobson	5 – Shayok	Hilton Coliseum (13,733); Ames, Iowa
December 3, 2018*; 7:00 p.m., Cyclones.tv		North Dakota State	W 81–59	7–1	20 – Shayok	10 – Jacobson	4 – Haliburton	Hilton Coliseum (13,809); Ames, Iowa
December 6, 2018*; 7:00 p.m., FS1		at No. 18 Iowa; Iowa Corn Cy-Hawk Series	L 84–98	7–2	21 – Horton-Tucker	6 – Horton-Tucker	5 – Haliburton	Carver–Hawkeye Arena (13,414); Iowa City, Iowa
December 9, 2018*; 5:00 p.m., Cyclones.tv		Southern	W 101–65	8–2	26 – Shayok	5 – tied	17 – Haliburton	Hilton Coliseum (13,937); Ames, Iowa
December 15, 2018*; 3:30 p.m., MC22		vs. Drake; Hy-Vee Classic	W 77–68	9–2	22 – Jacobson	9 – Horton-Tucker	6 – Weiler-Babb	Wells Fargo Arena (12,236); Des Moines, Iowa
December 21, 2018*; 6:00 p.m., Cyclones.tv		Eastern Illinois	W 101–53	10–2	23 – Shayok	8 – Haliburton	8 – Horton-Tucker	Hilton Coliseum (13,616); Ames, Iowa
January 2, 2019; 8:00 p.m., ESPNews		at Oklahoma State	W 69–63	11–2 (1–0)	17 – tied	8 – Wigginton	4 – Weiler-Babb	Gallagher-Iba Arena (6,523); Stillwater, Oklahoma
January 5, 2019; 3:00 p.m., ESPN2		No. 5 Kansas; Saturday Showcase	W 77–60	12–2 (2–0)	24 – Shayok	11 – Jacobson	5 – Horton-Tucker	Hilton Coliseum (14,384); Ames, Iowa
January 8, 2019; 6:00 p.m., ESPNews	No. 20	at Baylor; Super Tuesday	L 70–73	12–3 (2–1)	19 – Shayok	6 – Weiler-Babb	3 – tied	Ferrell Center (5,930); Waco, Texas
January 12, 2019; 11:00 am, ESPN2	No. 20	Kansas State; Saturday Showcase	L 57–58	12–4 (2–2)	11 – Weiler-Babb	5 – Wigginton	6 – Hailburton	Hilton Coliseum (14,384); Ames, Iowa
January 16, 2019; 8:00 p.m., ESPNU		at No. 8 Texas Tech	W 64–60	13–4 (3–2)	20 – Shayok	10 – Jacobson	6 – Haliburton	United Supermarkets Arena (15,098); Lubbock, Texas
January 19, 2019; 6:00 p.m., ESPNU		Oklahoma State; Saturday Showcase	W 72–59	14–4 (4–2)	20 – Shayok	5 – Lard	4 – Weiler-Babb	Hilton Coliseum (14,384); Ames, Iowa
January 21, 2019; 8:00 p.m., ESPN	No. 24	at No. 9 Kansas; Big Monday	L 76–80	14–5 (4–3)	26 – Shayok	11 – Jacobson	4 – Weiler-Babb	Allen Fieldhouse (16,300); Lawrence, Kansas
January 26, 2019*; 11:00 am, ESPN	No. 24	at No. 20 Ole Miss; Big 12/SEC Challenge/Saturday Showcase	W 87–73	15–5	23 – Horton-Tucker	9 – Weiler-Babb	9 – Haliburton	The Pavilion at Ole Miss (8,839); Oxford, Mississippi
January 30, 2019; 6:00 p.m., ESPNU	No. 20	West Virginia	W 93–68	16–5 (5–3)	28 – Wigginton	8 – Jacobson	5 – Haliburton	Hilton Coliseum (14,252); Ames, Iowa
February 2, 2019; 1:00 p.m., ESPN2	No. 20	Texas; Saturday Showcase	W 65–60	17–5 (6–3)	15 – Horton-Tucker	7 – Weiler-Babb	3 – Weiler-Babb	Hilton Coliseum (14,384); Ames, Iowa
February 4, 2019; 8:00 p.m., ESPN2	No. 17	at Oklahoma; Big Monday	W 75–74	18–5 (7–3)	18 – Wigginton	8 – tied	5 – Shayok	Lloyd Noble Center (8,889); Norman, Oklahoma
February 9, 2019; 1:00 p.m., ESPNU	No. 17	TCU; Saturday Showcase	L 83–92	18–6 (7–4)	24 – Shayok	7 – Shayok	4 – Horton-Tucker	Hilton Coliseum (14,384); Ames, Iowa
February 16, 2019; 3:00 p.m., ESPN2	No. 23	at No. 18 Kansas State; Saturday Showcase	W 78–64	19–6 (8–4)	23 – Wigginton	13 – Shayok	6 – Weiler-Babb	Bramlage Coliseum (12,528); Manhattan, Kansas
February 19, 2019; 8:00 p.m., ESPN2	No. 19	Baylor; Super Tuesday	L 69–73	19–7 (8–5)	20 – Shayok	7 – Horton-Tucker	6 – Weiler-Babb	Hilton Coliseum (14,084); Ames, Iowa
February 23, 2019; 1:00 p.m., ESPN2	No. 19	at TCU; Saturday Showcase	L 72–75	19–8 (8–6)	17 – Jacobson	9 – Horton-Tucker	7 – Haliburton	Schollmaier Arena (6,315); Fort Worth, Texas
February 25, 2019; 7:00 pm, ESPN2		Oklahoma; Big Monday	W 78–61	20–8 (9–6)	21 – Shayok	8 – Weiler-Babb	5 – tied	Hilton Coliseum (13,976); Ames, Iowa
March 2, 2019; 1:00 p.m., ESPN2		at Texas; Saturday Showcase	L 69–86	20–9 (9–7)	22 – Shayok	6 – Wigginton	4 – Wigginton	Frank Erwin Center (10,494); Austin, Texas
March 6, 2019; 6:00 p.m., ESPNU		at West Virginia	L 75–90	20–10 (9–8)	17 – Wigginton	7 – Conditt IV	4 – Weiler-Babb	WVU Coliseum (10,354); Morgantown, West Virginia
March 9, 2019; 1:00 p.m., ESPNews		No. 8 Texas Tech; Saturday Showcase	L 73–80	20–11 (9–9)	17 – Wigginton	7 – Wigginton	4 – Wigginton	Hilton Coliseum (14,384); Ames, Iowa
Big 12 tournament
March 14, 2019; 12:30 p.m., ESPN2	(5)	vs. (4) Baylor; Quarterfinals	W 83–66	21–11	21 – Horton-Tucker	7 – Jacobson	4 – Haliburton	Sprint Center (18,930); Kansas City, Missouri
March 15, 2019; 7:00 p.m., ESPN2	(5)	vs. (1) No. 15 Kansas State; Semifinals	W 63–59	22–11	21 – Shayok	16 – Jacobsen	3 – Weiler-Babb	Sprint Center (19,066); Kansas City, Missouri
March 16, 2019; 5:00 p.m., ESPN	(5)	vs. (3) No. 17 Kansas; Championship	W 78–66	23–11	17 – Wigginton	8 – Weiler-Babb	5 – Weiler-Babb	Sprint Center (19,066); Kansas City, Missouri
NCAA tournament
March 22, 2019*; 8:50 pm, TBS	(6 MW) No. 24	vs. (11 MW) Ohio State; First Round	L 59–62	23–12	23 – Shayok	6 – tied	4 – Weiler-Babb	BOK Center (12,443); Tulsa, Oklahoma
*Non-conference game. ^{#}Rankings from AP poll. (#) Tournament seedings in parentheses. MW=Midwest. All times are in Central.

== Awards and honors ==
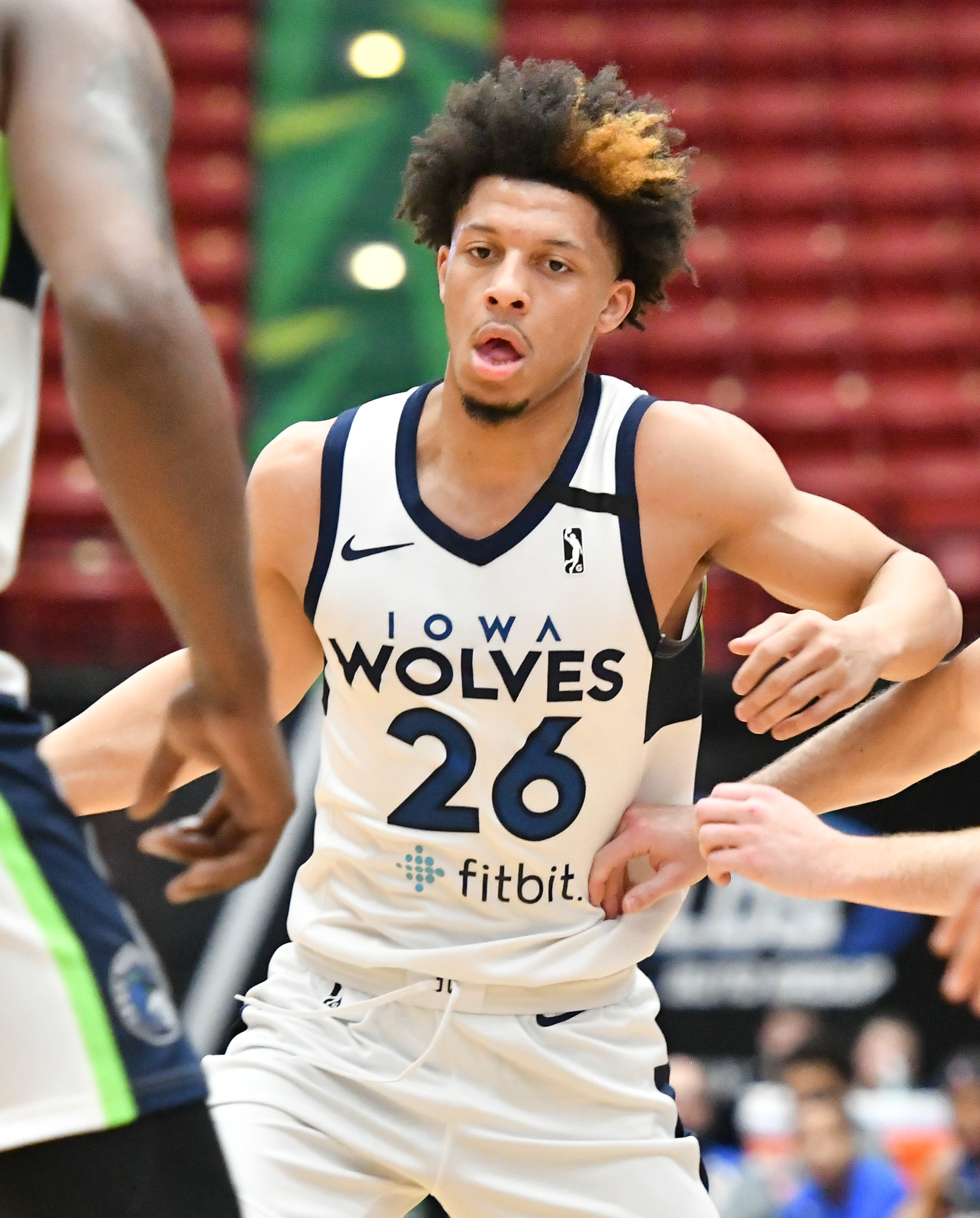
Lindell Wigginton

- Big 12 Player of the Week

Marial Shayok (January 7)

- Big 12 Newcomer of the Week

Talen Horton-Tucker (November 19)
Tyrese Haliburton (December 10)
Tyrese Haliburton (January 7)
Marial Shayok (January 21)

- Big 12 Sixth Man of the Year

Lindell Wigginton

== Rankings ==
Ranking movements Legend: ██ Increase in ranking ██ Decrease in ranking — = Not ranked RV = Received votes
	Week																				
Poll	Pre	1	2	3	4	5	6	7	8	9	10	11	12	13	14	15	16	17	18	19	Final
AP	—	—	—	RV	RV	RV	RV	RV	RV	RV	20	RV	24	20	17	23	19	RV	RV	24	Not released
Coaches	—	—	—	RV	RV	RV	RV	RV	RV	RV	21	RV	25	20	16	22	20	RV	25	23	25

^Coaches did not release a Week 1 poll.
*AP does not release post-NCAA tournament rankings.

== See also ==
- 2018–19 Iowa State Cyclones women's basketball team
