= 2018–19 Minnesota Golden Gophers men's basketball team =

American college basketball season

2018–19 Minnesota Golden Gophers men's basketball

Vancouver Showcase champions

NCAA tournament, Second Round
- Conference: Big Ten Conference
- Record: 22–14 (9–11 Big Ten)
- Head coach: Richard Pitino (6th season)
- Assistant coaches: Ed Conroy (3rd season); Rob Jeter (1st season); Kyle Lindsted (1st season)
- Home arena: Williams Arena

2018–19 Big Ten Conference men's basketball standings
| | Conf. | | | | Overall |
| Team | W | | L | PCT | W | | L | PCT |
|---|---|---|---|---|---|---|---|---|
| No. 5 Michigan State † | 16 | – | 4 | .800 | 32 | – | 7 | .821 |
| No. 13 Purdue | 16 | – | 4 | .800 | 26 | – | 10 | .722 |
| No. 8 Michigan | 15 | – | 5 | .750 | 30 | – | 7 | .811 |
| No. 21 Wisconsin | 14 | – | 6 | .700 | 23 | – | 11 | .676 |
| Maryland | 13 | – | 7 | .650 | 23 | – | 11 | .676 |
| Iowa | 10 | – | 10 | .500 | 23 | – | 12 | .657 |
| Minnesota | 9 | – | 11 | .450 | 22 | – | 14 | .611 |
| Ohio State | 8 | – | 12 | .400 | 20 | – | 15 | .571 |
| Indiana | 8 | – | 12 | .400 | 19 | – | 16 | .543 |
| Penn State | 7 | – | 13 | .350 | 14 | – | 18 | .438 |
| Illinois | 7 | – | 13 | .350 | 12 | – | 21 | .364 |
| Rutgers | 7 | – | 13 | .350 | 14 | – | 17 | .452 |
| Nebraska | 6 | – | 14 | .300 | 19 | – | 17 | .528 |
| Northwestern | 4 | – | 16 | .200 | 13 | – | 19 | .406 |
† 2019 Big Ten tournament winner Rankings from AP poll

The 2018–19 Minnesota Golden Gophers men's basketball team represented the University of Minnesota in the 2018–19 NCAA Division I men's basketball season. The Gophers, led by sixth-year head coach Richard Pitino, played their home games at Williams Arena in Minneapolis, Minnesota as members of the Big Ten Conference. The team was led by 2019 First team All-Big Ten selection Jordan Murphy and third team selection Amir Coffey. They finished the season 22-14, 9-11 in Big Ten Play to finish in 7th place. They defeated Penn State and Purdue to advance to the semifinals of the Big Ten tournament, where they lost to Michigan. They received an at-large bid to the NCAA tournament, where they defeated Louisville in the first round before losing in the second round to Michigan State.

== Previous season ==
The Golden Gophers finished the 2017–18 season 15–17, 4–14 in Big Ten play to finish in a three-way tie for 11th place. As the No. 11 seed in the Big Ten tournament, they lost in the first round to Rutgers.

== Offseason ==
=== Departures ===
| Name | Number | Pos. | Height | Weight | Year | Hometown | Reason for departure |
|---|---|---|---|---|---|---|---|
| Nate Mason | 2 | G | 6'2" | 190 | Senior | Decatur, GA | Graduated |
| Jamir Harris | 4 | G | 6'0" | 190 | Freshman | North Brunswick, NJ | Transferred to American |
| Davonte Fitzgerald | 20 | F | 6'8" | 225 | RS senior | Atlanta, GA | Transferred to Stephen F. Austin |
| Bakary Konaté | 21 | C | 6'11" | 240 | Senior | Bamako, Mali | Graduated |
| Reggie Lynch | 22 | C | 6'10" | 265 | RS senior | Edina, MN | Dismissed from school |
| Gaston Diedhiou | 41 | F | 6'10" | 245 | Senior | Dakar, Senegal | Graduated |

=== Incoming transfers ===
| Name | Pos. | Height | Weight | Year | Hometown | Previous school |
|---|---|---|---|---|---|---|
| Payton Willis | G | 6'4" | 182 | Junior | Fayetteville, AR | Vanderbilt |
| Marcus Carr | G | 6'1 | 185 | Sophomore | Toronto, ON | Pittsburgh |
| Brock Stull | G | 6'4 | 194 | RS senior | Rockford, IL | Milwaukee |

=== 2018 recruiting class ===
College recruiting
| Name | Hometown | School | Height | Weight | Commit date |
|---|---|---|---|---|---|
| Daniel Oturu; C | St. Paul, MN | Cretin-Derham Hall | 6 ft 10 in (2.08 m) | 216 lb (98 kg) | Jan 19, 2017 |
| Daniel Oturu; C | Recruit ratings: Scout: Rivals: 247Sports: ESPN: | | | | |
| Gabe Kalscheur; SG | Minneapolis, MN | DeLaSalle High School | 6 ft 3 in (1.91 m) | 182 lb (83 kg) | Jul 25, 2017 |
| Gabe Kalscheur; SG | Recruit ratings: Scout: Rivals: 247Sports: ESPN: | | | | |
| Jarvis Omersa; PF | Orono, MN | Orono High School | 6 ft 8 in (2.03 m) | 210 lb (95 kg) | Jul 18, 2017 |
| Jarvis Omersa; PF | Recruit ratings: Scout: Rivals: 247Sports: | | | | |
Overall recruit ranking:
Note: In many cases, Scout, Rivals, 247Sports, On3, and ESPN may conflict in their listings of height and weight.; In these cases, the average was taken. ESPN grades are on a 100-point scale.; Sources: "2018 Minnesota Commits". Rivals.; "2018 Team Ranking". Rivals.

== Roster ==
2018–19 Minnesota Golden Gophers men's basketball team
Players
Coaches

| Pos. | # | Name | Height | Weight | Year | Previous school | Hometown |
|---|---|---|---|---|---|---|---|
| G | 0 | Payton Willis (I) (redshirt) | 6 ft 4 in (1.93 m) | 182 lb (83 kg) | Jr | Fayetteville; Vanderbilt | Fayetteville, AR |
| G | 1 | Dupree McBrayer | 6 ft 5 in (1.96 m) | 195 lb (88 kg) | Sr | Sunrise Christian Academy | Queens, NY |
| G | 2 | Marcus Carr (I) (redshirt) | 6 ft 2 in (1.88 m) | 185 lb (84 kg) | So | Montverde Academy; Pittsburgh | Toronto, ON |
| F | 3 | Jordan Murphy (C) | 6 ft 6 in (1.98 m) | 250 lb (113 kg) | Sr | Brennan | San Antonio, TX |
| G | 5 | Amir Coffey | 6 ft 8 in (2.03 m) | 205 lb (93 kg) | Jr | Hopkins | Hopkins, MN |
| G | 10 | Brady Rudrud (W) | 6 ft 2 in (1.88 m) | 190 lb (86 kg) | Jr | Eden Prairie | Eden Prairie, MN |
| G | 11 | Isaiah Washington | 6 ft 1 in (1.85 m) | 190 lb (86 kg) | So | St. Raymond | Harlem, NY |
| G | 13 | Hunt Conroy (W) | 5 ft 10 in (1.78 m) | 165 lb (75 kg) | So | Jesuit | New Orleans, LA |
| F | 21 | Jarvis Omersa | 6 ft 6 in (1.98 m) | 225 lb (102 kg) | Fr | Orono | Orono, MN |
| G | 22 | Gabe Kalscheur | 6 ft 4 in (1.93 m) | 180 lb (82 kg) | Fr | DeLaSalle | Edina, MN |
| F | 24 | Eric Curry | 6 ft 9 in (2.06 m) | 235 lb (107 kg) | RS So | Southwest Christian Academy | Memphis, TN |
| C | 25 | Daniel Oturu | 6 ft 10 in (2.08 m) | 225 lb (102 kg) | Fr | Cretin-Derham Hall | Woodbury, MN |
| G | 31 | Brock Stull | 6 ft 4 in (1.93 m) | 195 lb (88 kg) | RS Sr | Boylan Catholic; Milwaukee | Rockford, IL |
| C | 35 | Matz Stockman | 7 ft 0 in (2.13 m) | 240 lb (109 kg) | RS Sr | Canarias Academy; Louisville | Oslo, Norway |
| F | 42 | Michael Hurt | 6 ft 7 in (2.01 m) | 220 lb (100 kg) | Jr | John Marshall | Rochester, MN |

Head coach

- Richard Pitino (Providence)

Assistant coach(es)

- Ed Conroy (The Citadel)
- Rob Jeter (UW–Platteville)
- Kyle Lindsted (Central Christian (KS))

Legend

- (C) Team captain
- (S) Suspended
- (I) Ineligible
- (W) Walk-on
- Injured
- Current redshirt

Roster

== Schedule and results ==
The 2018–19 season was the first time in Big Ten history that the teams played a 20-game conference schedule, setting a precedent for all Division I basketball. The new schedule also included a regional component to increase the frequency of games among teams in similar areas. Over the course of a six-year cycle (12 playing opportunities), in-state rivals will play each other 12 times, regional opponents will play 10 times, and all other teams will play nine times. Three in-state series will be guaranteed home-and-homes: Illinois and Northwestern, Indiana and Purdue, and Michigan and Michigan State will always play twice.

| Date time, TV | Rank^{#} | Opponent^{#} | Result | Record | High points | High rebounds | High assists | Site (attendance) city, state |
Exhibition
| November 1, 2018*; 7:00 pm, BTN+ | | Minnesota–Duluth | W 109–53 | – | 18 – Washington | 10 – Oturu | 6 – Stull | Williams Arena (7,481); Minneapolis, MN |
Regular season
| November 6, 2018*; 7:00 pm, BTN+ | | Omaha | W 104–76 | 1–0 | 18 – Coffey | 10 – Murphy | 11 – Washington | Williams Arena (8,883); Minneapolis, MN |
| November 12, 2018*; 8:00 pm, BTN | | Utah | W 78–69 | 2–0 | 19 – Kalscheur | 17 – Murphy | 6 – Tied | Williams Arena (11,554); Minneapolis, MN |
| November 18, 2018*; 9:30 pm, ESPN2 | | vs. Texas A&M; Vancouver Showcase | W 69–64 | 3–0 | 14 – Murphy | 9 – Oturu | 3 – Washington | Vancouver Convention Centre (3,107); Vancouver, BC |
| November 20, 2018*; 8:00 pm, BTN | | vs. Santa Clara; Vancouver Showcase | W 80–66 | 4–0 | 25 – Kalscheur | 17 – Murphy | 6 – Murphy | Vancouver Convention Centre (3,070); Vancouver, BC |
| November 21, 2018*; 7:00 pm, BTN | | vs. Washington; Vancouver Showcase | W 68–66 | 5–0 | 18 – Murphy | 11 – Murphy | 2 – Tied | Vancouver Convention Centre (1,680); Vancouver, BC |
| November 26, 2018*; 8:00 pm, ESPN2 | | at Boston College; ACC–Big Ten Challenge | L 56–68 | 5–1 | 16 – Murphy | 11 – Murphy | 3 – Washington | Conte Forum (4,389); Chestnut Hill, MA |
| November 30, 2018*; 9:00 pm, BTN | | vs. Oklahoma State; U.S. Bank Stadium Classic | W 83–76 | 6–1 | 24 – Murphy | 16 – Murphy | 4 – Washington | U.S. Bank Stadium (12,357); Minneapolis, MN |
| December 2, 2018; 6:00 pm, BTN | | at No. 16 Ohio State | L 59–79 | 6–2 (0–1) | 19 – Coffey | 7 – Tied | 3 – Washington | Value City Arena (11,668); Columbus, OH |
| December 5, 2018; 8:00 pm, BTN | | No. 24 Nebraska | W 85–78 | 7–2 (1–1) | 32 – Coffey | 13 – Murphy | 6 – Coffey | Williams Arena (9,624); Minneapolis, MN |
| December 8, 2018*; 3:00 pm, BTN+ | | Arkansas State | W 72–56 | 8–2 | 19 – Oturu | 12 – Tied | 6 – Coffey | Williams Arena (10,257); Minneapolis, MN |
| December 11, 2018*; 8:00 pm, BTN | | North Florida | W 80–71 | 9–2 | 20 – Murphy | 18 – Murphy | 13 – Washington | Williams Arena (9,212); Minneapolis, MN |
| December 21, 2018*; 7:00 pm, BTN+ | | North Carolina A&T | W 86–67 | 10–2 | 30 – Murphy | 16 – Murphy | 10 – Washington | Williams Arena (10,144); Minneapolis, MN |
| December 30, 2018*; 3:00 pm, ESPNU | | Mount St. Mary's | W 71–53 | 11–2 | 15 – McBrayer | 10 – Oturu | 3 – Tied | Williams Arena (10,767); Minneapolis, MN |
| January 3, 2019; 8:00 pm, BTN | | at No. 22 Wisconsin | W 59–52 | 12–2 (2–1) | 21 – Coffey | 11 – Murphy | 3 – Coffey | Kohl Center (16,687); Madison, WI |
| January 8, 2019; 6:00 pm, BTN | | Maryland | L 67–82 | 12–3 (2–2) | 16 – Coffey | 11 – Oturu | 5 – Coffey | Williams Arena (9,919); Minneapolis, MN |
| January 12, 2019; 11:30 am, BTN | | Rutgers | W 88–70 | 13–3 (3–2) | 29 – Coffey | 16 – Murphy | 10 – McBrayer | Williams Arena (10,837); Minneapolis, MN |
| January 16, 2019; 8:00 pm, BTN | | at Illinois | L 68–95 | 13–4 (3–3) | 17 – Oturu | 8 – Oturu | 4 – Washington | State Farm Center (11,503); Champaign, IL |
| January 19, 2019; 7:30 pm, BTN | | Penn State | W 65–64 | 14–4 (4–3) | 19 – Murphy | 21 – Murphy | 6 – Murphy | Williams Arena (11,042); Minneapolis, MN |
| January 22, 2019; 6:00 pm, BTN | | at No. 5 Michigan | L 57–59 | 14–5 (4–4) | 15 – Murphy | 11 – Murphy | 4 – McBrayer | Crisler Center (12,707); Ann Arbor, MI |
| January 27, 2019; 4:00 pm, FS1 | | No. 19 Iowa | W 92–87 | 15–5 (5–4) | 23 – Tied | 11 – Murphy | 7 – McBrayer | Williams Arena (11,582); Minneapolis, MN |
| January 30, 2019; 8:00 pm, BTN | | Illinois | W 86–75 | 16–5 (6–4) | 18 – Coffey | 10 – Murphy | 6 – Coffey | Williams Arena (9,565); Minneapolis, MN |
| February 3, 2019; 11:00 am, BTN | | at No. 17 Purdue | L 63–73 | 16–6 (6–5) | 22 – Coffey | 10 – Murphy | 5 – Washington | Mackey Arena (14,804); West Lafayette, IN |
| February 6, 2019; 8:00 pm, BTN | | No. 19 Wisconsin | L 51–56 | 16–7 (6–6) | 16 – Murphy | 19 – Murphy | 5 – McBrayer | Williams Arena (14,625); Minneapolis, MN |
| February 9, 2019; 1:00 pm, ESPN | | at No. 9 Michigan State | L 55–79 | 16–8 (6–7) | 17 – Kalscheur | 7 – Oturu | 4 – Coffey | Breslin Center (14,797); East Lansing, MI |
| February 13, 2019; 8:00 pm, BTN | | at Nebraska | L 61–62 | 16–9 (6–8) | 19 – Murphy | 13 – Murphy | 4 – McBrayer | Pinnacle Bank Arena (15,642); Lincoln, NE |
| February 16, 2019; 1:00 pm, ESPN2 | | Indiana | W 84–63 | 17–9 (7–8) | 23 – Murphy | 11 – Murphy | 7 – Coffey | Williams Arena (11,639); Minneapolis, MN |
| February 21, 2019; 6:00 pm, ESPN | | No. 7 Michigan | L 60–69 | 17-10 (7-9) | 18 – Tied | 15 – Murphy | 4 – Coffey | Williams Arena (11,084); Minneapolis, MN |
| February 24, 2019; 5:30 pm, BTN | | at Rutgers | L 64–68 | 17–11 (7–10) | 21 – Kalscheur | 8 – Oturu | 3 – Coffey | Louis Brown Athletic Center (7,270); Piscataway, NJ |
| February 28, 2019; 8:00 pm, ESPN2 | | at Northwestern | W 62–50 | 18–11 (8–10) | 32 – Coffey | 12 – Coffey | 3 – Coffey | Welsh–Ryan Arena (6,869); Evanston, IL |
| March 5, 2019; 7:00 pm, BTN | | No. 11 Purdue | W 73–69 | 19–11 (9–10) | 32 – Coffey | 14 – Murphy | 4 – Tied | Williams Arena (10,062); Minneapolis, MN |
| March 8, 2019; 5:30 pm, FS1 | | at No. 24 Maryland | L 60–69 | 19–12 (9–11) | 23 – Coffey | 11 – Oturu | 6 – Coffey | Xfinity Center (16,662); College Park, MD |
Big Ten tournament
| March 14, 2019; 6:00 pm, BTN | (7) | vs. (10) Penn State; Second Round | W 77–72 ^{OT} | 20–12 | 22 – Coffey | 14 – Murphy | 5 – Tied | United Center (16,207); Chicago, IL |
| March 15, 2019; 6:00 pm, BTN | (7) | vs. (2) No. 13 Purdue; Quarterfinals | W 75–73 | 21–12 | 27 – Murphy | 10 – Oturu | 4 – Tied | United Center (18,575); Chicago, IL |
| March 16, 2019; 2:30 pm, CBS | (7) | vs. (3) No. 10 Michigan; Semifinals | L 49–76 | 21–13 | 14 – Coffey | 6 – Murphy | 7 – McBrayer | United Center (18,468); Chicago, IL |
NCAA tournament
| Mar 21, 2019*; 11:15 am, CBS | (10 E) | vs. (7 E) Louisville; First Round | W 86–76 | 22–13 | 24 – Kalscheur | 8 – Kalscheur | 4 – McBrayer | Wells Fargo Arena (16,512); Des Moines, IA |
| Mar 23, 2019*; 6:45 pm, CBS | (10 E) | vs. (2 E) No. 5 Michigan State; Second Round | L 50–70 | 22–14 | 27 – Coffey | 7 – Omersa | 4 – Coffey | Wells Fargo Arena (16,770); Des Moines, IA |
*Non-conference game. ^{#}Rankings from AP Poll. (#) Tournament seedings in parentheses. E=East. All times are in Central Time.

== Rankings ==
Ranking movements Legend: RV = Received votes
| | Week | | | | | | | | | | | | | | | | | | | |
| Poll | Pre | 1 | 2 | 3 | 4 | 5 | 6 | 7 | 8 | 9 | 10 | 11 | 12 | 13 | 14 | 15 | 16 | 17 | 18 | Final |
|---|---|---|---|---|---|---|---|---|---|---|---|---|---|---|---|---|---|---|---|---|
| AP | | | | RV | | RV | RV | | | RV | RV | | | | | | | | | Not released |
| Coaches | | | RV | RV | | | | | | RV | RV | | | | | | | | | RV |

*AP does not release post-NCAA tournament rankings
