= 2018–19 Nebraska Cornhuskers men's basketball team =

American college basketball season

2018–19 Nebraska Cornhuskers men's basketball

NIT, Second Round
- Conference: Big Ten Conference
- Record: 19–17 (6–14 Big Ten)
- Head coach: Tim Miles (7th season)
- Assistant coaches: Armon Gates; Michael Lewis; Jim Molinari
- Home arena: Pinnacle Bank Arena

2018–19 Big Ten Conference men's basketball standings
	Conf.				Overall
Team	W		L	PCT	W		L	PCT
No. 5 Michigan State †	16	–	4	.800	32	–	7	.821
No. 13 Purdue	16	–	4	.800	26	–	10	.722
No. 8 Michigan	15	–	5	.750	30	–	7	.811
No. 21 Wisconsin	14	–	6	.700	23	–	11	.676
Maryland	13	–	7	.650	23	–	11	.676
Iowa	10	–	10	.500	23	–	12	.657
Minnesota	9	–	11	.450	22	–	14	.611
Ohio State	8	–	12	.400	20	–	15	.571
Indiana	8	–	12	.400	19	–	16	.543
Penn State	7	–	13	.350	14	–	18	.438
Illinois	7	–	13	.350	12	–	21	.364
Rutgers	7	–	13	.350	14	–	17	.452
Nebraska	6	–	14	.300	19	–	17	.528
Northwestern	4	–	16	.200	13	–	19	.406
† 2019 Big Ten tournament winner Rankings from AP poll

The 2018–19 Nebraska Cornhuskers men's basketball team represented the University of Nebraska–Lincoln in the 2018–19 NCAA Division I men's basketball season. The Cornhuskers were led by seventh-year coach head coach Tim Miles and played their home games at Pinnacle Bank Arena in Lincoln, Nebraska as members of the Big Ten Conference. They finished the season 19–17, 6–14 in Big Ten play to finish in 13th place. In the Big Ten tournament, they defeated Rutgers and Maryland to advance to the quarterfinals where they lost to Wisconsin. They received an at-large bid to the National Invitation Tournament where they defeated Butler in the first round before losing to TCU.

On March 26, 2019, Tim Miles was fired. Four days later, the school hired former Chicago Bulls' head coach Fred Hoiberg as the next head coach.

== Previous season ==
The Cornhuskers finished the 2017–18 season 2211, 13–5 in Big Ten play to finish in a tie for fourth place. As the No. 4 seed in the Big Ten tournament, they lost in the quarterfinals to Michigan. Despite winning 13 Big Ten games, the Cornhuskers did not receive a bid to the NCAA tournament, but did receive a bid to the National Invitation Tournament. However, they lost in the first round of the NIT to Mississippi State.

== Offseason ==
=== Departures ===
On March 27, 2018, junior guard James Palmer Jr. announced that he would declare for the NBA draft, but not sign with an agent. Junior forward Isaac Copeland also declared for the draft, but did not sign with an agent. Both chose to return to Nebraska for their senior seasons before the NBA draft deadline.

Name	No.	Pos.	Height	Weight	Year	Hometown	Notes
Jordy Tshimanga	32	C	6'11"	268	SO	Montreal, QC, Canada	Transferred to Dayton
Jack McVeigh	10	F	6'8"	215	JR	Cabarita Beach, NSW, Australia	Signed in NBL
Duby Okeke	0	C	6'8"	247	SR	Jonesboro, GA	Graduated
Malcolm Laws	3	G	6'1"	191	SR	Orlando, FL	Graduated
Evan Taylor	11	G	6'5"	206	RS SR	Cincinnati, OH	Graduated
Anton Gill	13	G	6'3"	195	RS SR	Raleigh, NC	Graduated

=== Incoming transfers ===
Name	No.	Pos.	Height	Weight	Year	Hometown	Previous school
Dachon Burke	11	G	6 ft 4 in	180 lb	Sophomore	Orange, NJ	Robert Morris
Dedoch Chan	02	F	6 ft 8 in	210 lb	Freshman	Rochester, MN	Mississippi Gulf Coast CC

=== 2018 recruiting class ===
Following the departure of Nebraska assistant coach Kenya Hunter in April, 2018, signee Xavier Johnson was granted a release from his Letter of Intent to Nebraska.

College recruiting
Name	Hometown	School	Height	Weight	Commit date
Karrington Davis; SF	St. Louis, MO	Montverde (FL)	6 ft 5 in (1.96 m)	175 lb (79 kg)	Mar 10, 2018
Karrington Davis; SF	Recruit ratings: Rivals: 247Sports: (N/A)				
Brady Heiman; C	Springfield, NE	Springfield (NE) Platteview	6 ft 10 in (2.08 m)	197 lb (89 kg)	Aug 8, 2017
Brady Heiman; C	Recruit ratings: Rivals: 247Sports: (N/A)				
Amir Harris; G	Hagerstown, MD	Hagerstown (MD) St. Maria Goretti	6 ft 5 in (1.96 m)	170 lb (77 kg)	May 10, 2018
Amir Harris; G	Recruit ratings: Rivals: 247Sports: ESPN: (77)				
Overall recruit ranking: 247Sports: 82
Note: In many cases, Scout, Rivals, 247Sports, On3, and ESPN may conflict in their listings of height and weight.; In these cases, the average was taken. ESPN grades are on a 100-point scale.; Sources: "2018 Team Ranking". Rivals.

== Roster ==
2018–19 Nebraska Cornhuskers men's basketball team
Players
Coaches

Pos.	#	Name	Height	Weight	Year	Previous school	Hometown
G	0	James Palmer Jr.	6 ft 6 in (1.98 m)	207 lb (94 kg)	RS Sr	Miami (FL)	Upper Marlboro, MD
G	1	Amir Harris (injured)	6 ft 4 in (1.93 m)	205 lb (93 kg)	Fr	St. Maria Goretti HS	Frederick, MD
G	4	Johnny Trueblood (W)	6 ft 3 in (1.91 m)	194 lb (88 kg)	RS Jr	Elkhorn South HS	Elkhorn, NE
G	5	Glynn Watson Jr.	6 ft 0 in (1.83 m)	180 lb (82 kg)	Sr	St. Joseph HS	Bellwood, IL
G	10	Karrington Davis (injured) (redshirt)	6 ft 6 in (1.98 m)	215 lb (98 kg)	Fr	Montverde Academy HS	St. Louis, MO
G	11	Dachon Burke (I) (redshirt)	6 ft 4 in (1.93 m)	180 lb (82 kg)	Jr	Robert Morris	Orange, NJ
G	12	Thomas Allen (injured)	6 ft 1 in (1.85 m)	184 lb (83 kg)	So	Brewster Academy	Garner, NC
F	14	Isaac Copeland (injured)	6 ft 9 in (2.06 m)	225 lb (102 kg)	RS Sr	Georgetown	Raleigh, NC
F	15	Isaiah Roby	6 ft 8 in (2.03 m)	230 lb (104 kg)	Jr	Dixon HS	Dixon, IL
F	20	Tanner Borchardt	6 ft 8 in (2.03 m)	250 lb (113 kg)	Sr	Gothenburg HS	Gothenburg, NE
G	25	Nana Akenten (S)	6 ft 6 in (1.98 m)	218 lb (99 kg)	So	Bolingbrook HS	Bolingbrook, IL
G	33	Justin Costello (W)	6 ft 1 in (1.85 m)	200 lb (91 kg)	RS Fr	Eklhorn South HS	Elkhorn, NE
G	34	Þórir Þorbjarnarson	6 ft 6 in (1.98 m)	206 lb (93 kg)	So	Menntaskólinn í Reykjavík	Akureyri, Iceland
F	45	Brady Heiman	6 ft 11 in (2.11 m)	215 lb (98 kg)	Fr	Platteview HS	Springfield, NE

Head coach

- Tim Miles (Mary)

Assistant coach(es)

- Armon Gates (Kent State)
- Michael Lewis (Indiana)
- Jim Molinari (Illinois Wesleyan)

Legend

- (C) Team captain
- (S) Suspended
- (I) Ineligible
- (W) Walk-on
- Injured
- Current redshirt

Roster

== Schedule and results ==
The 2018–19 season marked the first time in Big Ten history that the teams will play a 20-game conference schedule, setting a precedent for all Division I basketball. The new schedule also included a regional component to increase the frequency of games among teams in similar areas. Over the course of a six-year cycle (12 playing opportunities), in-state rivals will play each other 12 times, regional opponents will play 10 times, and all other teams will play nine times. Three in-state series will be guaranteed home-and-homes: Illinois and Northwestern, Indiana and Purdue, and Michigan and Michigan State will always play twice.

The Cornhuskers notably beat in-state rival Creighton 94–75 in the 2018–19 season for the first time since the 2010–11 season.

Nebraska again participated in the Gavitt Tipoff Games where they defeated Seton Hall. The Cornuskers also participated in the CBE Hall of Fame Classic on November 19 and 20, at the Sprint Center in Kansas City, Missouri. Fellow participants in the tournament included Missouri State, Texas Tech, and USC.

Date time, TV	Rank^{#}	Opponent^{#}	Result	Record	High points	High rebounds	High assists	Site (attendance) city, state
Exhibition
November 1, 2018*; 7:00 pm, BTN Plus		Wayne State (NE)	W 75–40	–	12 – Roby	10 – Roby	5 – Tied	Pinnacle Bank Arena (15,385); Lincoln, NE
Regular season
November 6, 2018*; 7:00 pm, BTN Plus		Mississippi Valley State; Hall of Fame Classic campus-site game	W 106–37	1–0	19 – Watson	13 – Heiman	5 – Palmer	Pinnacle Bank Arena (15,307); Lincoln, NE
November 11, 2018*; 3:00 pm, ESPNU		Southeastern Louisiana; Hall of Fame Classic campus-site game	W 87–35	2–0	17 – Palmer	7 – Roby	5 – Allen	Pinnacle Bank Arena (15,462); Lincoln, NE
November 14, 2018*; 7:30 pm, BTN		Seton Hall; Gavitt Tipoff Games	W 80–57	3–0	29 – Palmer	10 – Copeland	8 – Watson	Pinnacle Bank Arena (15,713); Lincoln, NE
November 19, 2018*; 6:00 pm, ESPNU		vs. Missouri State; Hall of Fame Classic semifinals	W 85–62	4–0	23 – Copeland	7 – Tied	4 – Tied	Sprint Center (N/A); Kansas City, MO
November 20, 2018*; 8:30 pm, ESPN2		vs. Texas Tech; Hall of Fame Classic finals	L 52–70	4–1	20 – Copeland	8 – Copeland	3 – Watson	Sprint Center (6,521); Kansas City, MO
November 24, 2018*; 1:00 pm, BTN Plus		Western Illinois	W 73–49	5–1	20 – Watson	9 – Watson	3 – Watson	Pinnacle Bank Arena (15,800); Lincoln, NE
November 26, 2018*; 6:00 pm, ESPN2		at Clemson; ACC–Big Ten Challenge	W 68–66	6–1	20 – Palmer	9 – Palmer	3 – Tied	Littlejohn Coliseum (6,974); Clemson, SC
December 2, 2018; 4:00 pm, BTN		Illinois	W 75–60	7–1 (1–0)	23 – Palmer	6 – Tied	4 – Palmer	Pinnacle Bank Arena (15,764); Lincoln, NE
December 5, 2018; 8:00 pm, BTN	No. 24	at Minnesota	L 78–85	7–2 (1–1)	17 – Copeland	7 – Copeland	4 – Tied	Williams Arena (9,624); Minneapolis, MN
December 8, 2018*; 5:00 pm, BTN	No. 24	Creighton; Rivalry	W 94–75	8–2	30 – Palmer	8 – Roby	5 – Watson	Pinnacle Bank Arena (15,950); Lincoln, NE
December 16, 2018*; 6:00 pm, BTN		vs. Oklahoma State; Sioux Falls Showcase	W 79–56	9–2	29 – Palmer	7 – Roby	5 – Palmer	Sanford Pentagon (3,800); Sioux Falls, SD
December 22, 2018*; 1:00 pm, BTN	No. 25	Cal State Fullerton	W 86–62	10–2	23 – Palmer	8 – Roby	10 – Watson	Pinnacle Bank Arena (15,088); Lincoln, NE
December 29, 2018*; 1:00 pm, BTN Plus		Southwest Minnesota State	W 79–38	11–2	16 – Tied	9 – Borchardt	5 – Palmer	Pinnacle Bank Arena (15,057); Lincoln, NE
January 2, 2019; 5:30 pm, BTN	No. 24	at Maryland	L 72–74	11–3 (1–2)	26 – Palmer	7 – Tied	4 – Tied	Xfinity Center; College Park, MD
January 6, 2019; 4:30 pm, BTN	No. 24	at No. 25 Iowa	L 84–93	11–4 (1–3)	24 – Copeland	9 – Roby	5 – Watson	Carver–Hawkeye Arena (11,782); Iowa City, IA
January 10, 2019; 8:00 pm, ESPN2		Penn State	W 70–64	12–4 (2–3)	22 – Roby	11 – Roby	4 – Palmer	Pinnacle Bank Arena (15,753); Lincoln, NE
January 14, 2019; 5:30 pm, FS1		at No. 25 Indiana	W 66–51	13–4 (3–3)	15 – Watson	9 – Palmer	7 – Palmer	Simon Skjodt Assembly Hall (17,222); Bloomington, IN
January 17, 2019; 7:00 pm, FS1		No. 6 Michigan State	L 64–70	13–5 (3–4)	24 – Palmer	8 – Palmer	3 – Palmer	Pinnacle Bank Arena (15,923); Lincoln, NE
January 21, 2019; 7:00 pm, BTN		at Rutgers	L 69–76	13–6 (3–5)	22 – Palmer	8 – Tied	4 – Tied	Louis Brown Athletic Center (5,022); Piscataway, NJ
January 26, 2019; 11:00 am, FS1		Ohio State	L 60–70	13–7 (3–6)	19 – Palmer	9 – Roby	4 – Palmer	Pinnacle Bank Arena (15,890); Lincoln, NE
January 29, 2019; 8:00 pm, BTN		No. 24 Wisconsin	L 51–62	13–8 (3–7)	18 – Roby	10 – Þorbjarnarson	3 – Roby	Pinnacle Bank Arena (15,739); Lincoln, NE
February 2, 2019; 1:15 pm, BTN		at Illinois	L 64–71	13–9 (3–8)	22 – Palmer	18 – Borchardt	3 – Tied	State Farm Center (13,588); Champaign, IL
February 6, 2019; 6:00 pm, BTN		No. 24 Maryland	L 45–60	13–10 (3–9)	20 – Roby	14 – Roby	3 – Palmer	Pinnacle Bank Arena (15,552); Lincoln, NE
February 9, 2019; 7:30 pm, BTN		at No. 15 Purdue	L 62–81	13–11 (3–10)	17 – Palmer	5 – Tied	4 – Roby	Mackey Arena (14,804); West Lafayette, IN
February 13, 2019; 8:00 pm, BTN		Minnesota	W 62–61	14–11 (4–10)	24 – Palmer	9 – Allen	3 – Tied	Pinnacle Bank Arena (15,642); Lincoln, NE
February 16, 2019; 7:30 pm, BTN		Northwestern	W 59–50	15–11 (5–10)	19 – Roby	16 – Roby	6 – Palmer	Pinnacle Bank Arena (15,927); Lincoln, NE
February 19, 2019; 6:00 pm, FS1		at Penn State	L 71–95	15–12 (5–11)	24 – Palmer	7 – Palmer	5 – Allen	Bryce Jordan Center (8,049); University Park, PA
February 23, 2019; 3:00 pm, BTN		No. 15 Purdue	L 72–75	15–13 (5–12)	25 – Watson	7 – Borchardt	8 – Palmer	Pinnacle Bank Arena (15,652); Lincoln, NE
February 28, 2019; 6:00 pm, ESPN		at No. 9 Michigan	L 53–82	15–14 (5–13)	11 – Akenten	2 – Tied	2 – Watson Jr	Crisler Center (12,707); Ann Arbor, MI
March 5, 2019; 6:00 pm, ESPN2		at No. 9 Michigan State	L 76–91	15–15 (5–14)	30 – Palmer	9 – Roby	5 – Roby	Breslin Center (14,797); East Lansing, MI
March 10, 2019; 1:00 pm, BTN		Iowa	W 93–91 ^{OT}	16–15 (6–14)	27 – Palmer	10 – Harris	6 – Palmer	Pinnacle Bank Arena (15,821); Lincoln, NE
Big Ten tournament
March 13, 2019; 5:30 pm, BTN	(13)	vs. (12) Rutgers; First Round	W 68–61	17–15	34 – Palmer	6 – Roby	5 – Watson	United Center (16,473); Chicago, IL
March 14, 2019; 1:55 pm, BTN	(13)	vs. (5) No. 21 Maryland; Second Round	W 69–61	18–15	24 – Palmer	9 – Borchardt	3 – 3 tied	United Center (16,207); Chicago, IL
March 15, 2019; 2:00 pm, BTN	(13)	vs. (4) No. 19 Wisconsin; Quarterfinals	L 62–66	18–16	23 – Watson	6 – Roby	3 – Watson	United Center (17,369); Chicago, IL
NIT
March 20, 2019*; 8:00 pm, ESPN2	(4)	(5) Butler; First Round – TCU Bracket	W 80–76	19–16	28 – Roby	8 – Roby	5 – Trueblood	Pinnacle Bank Arena (10,103); Lincoln, NE
March 24, 2019*; 8:30 pm, ESPNU	(4)	at (1) TCU; Second Round – TCU Bracket	L 72–88	19–17	19 – Palmer	13 – Borchardt	6 – Watson	Schollmaier Arena (3,445); Fort Worth, TX
*Non-conference game. ^{#}Rankings from AP Poll. (#) Tournament seedings in parentheses. All times are in Central Time.

== Rankings ==
Ranking movements Legend: ██ Increase in ranking ██ Decrease in ranking RV = Received votes т = Tied with team above or below
	Week																			
Poll	Pre	1	2	3	4	5	6	7	8	9	10	11	12	13	14	15	16	17	18	Final
AP	RV	RV	RV	RV	24	RV	25	RV	24	RV	RV									Not released
Coaches	25	25^	24	RV	25	25	22	23	23-T	RV	RV									

^Coaches did not release a Week 2 poll.
