= 2018–19 Indiana Hoosiers men's basketball team =

American college basketball season

2018–19 Indiana Hoosiers men's basketball

NIT, Quarterfinals
- Conference: Big Ten Conference
- Record: 19–16 (8–12 Big Ten)
- Head coach: Archie Miller (2nd season)
- Assistant coaches: Tom Ostrom (2nd season); Ed Schilling (2nd season); Bruiser Flint (2nd season)
- Captains: Juwan Morgan; Zach McRoberts
- Home arena: Simon Skjodt Assembly Hall

2018–19 Big Ten Conference men's basketball standings
	Conf.				Overall
Team	W		L	PCT	W		L	PCT
No. 5 Michigan State †	16	–	4	.800	32	–	7	.821
No. 13 Purdue	16	–	4	.800	26	–	10	.722
No. 8 Michigan	15	–	5	.750	30	–	7	.811
No. 21 Wisconsin	14	–	6	.700	23	–	11	.676
Maryland	13	–	7	.650	23	–	11	.676
Iowa	10	–	10	.500	23	–	12	.657
Minnesota	9	–	11	.450	22	–	14	.611
Ohio State	8	–	12	.400	20	–	15	.571
Indiana	8	–	12	.400	19	–	16	.543
Penn State	7	–	13	.350	14	–	18	.438
Illinois	7	–	13	.350	12	–	21	.364
Rutgers	7	–	13	.350	14	–	17	.452
Nebraska	6	–	14	.300	19	–	17	.528
Northwestern	4	–	16	.200	13	–	19	.406
† 2019 Big Ten tournament winner Rankings from AP poll

The 2018–19 Indiana Hoosiers men's basketball team represented Indiana University in the 2018–19 NCAA Division I men's basketball season. Their head coach was Archie Miller, in his second year as Indiana head coach. The team played its home games at Simon Skjodt Assembly Hall in Bloomington, Indiana, as a member of the Big Ten Conference. The season officially kicked off with its annual event, Hoosier Hysteria, on September 29, 2018.

Despite getting off to a strong start of 12–2, which included three conference wins, IU struggled mightily down the backstretch of the season. Riddled with injuries and the inability to shoot, the Hoosiers lost 12 of 13 games before turning things around and finishing the regular season with a four-game winning streak. Having put themselves back into the conversation for making the NCAA Tournament for the first time in three years, the Hoosiers looked to knock off Ohio State in the Big Ten tournament. With a win, many bracketologists had IU safely in the field. However, the Hoosiers fell short and lost to Ohio State, 79–75. IU was deemed one of the Last Four Out in the NCAA Tournament, so they earned 1-seed in the NIT, where they advanced to the quarterfinals before losing to Wichita State, 73–63. Thus, the Hoosiers' 119th season ended with an overall record of 19–16 and 8–12 in the Big Ten.

== Previous season ==
Miller's first season was a major remodeling job, starting with laying the foundation of a pack-line defense and valuing possessions. Early in the season, Miller stated practices were 75% defense, 25% offense. That scheme showed early and often, as the Hoosiers struggled mightily throughout the season to find any flow or rhythm on offense, despite the defense making leaps and bounds in the overall rankings of Division 1 basketball. With a surprising early second round loss in the 2018 Big Ten tournament to Rutgers, 76–67, and losing enough games to keep them out of both the NCAA tournament and NIT, including games in which they were favored, such as Indiana State and Fort Wayne, IU's first season under their new coach came to a disappointing close. They finished with an overall record of 16–15 and 9–9 in the Big Ten.

== Offseason ==
=== Departures ===
On April 12, 2018, junior forward Juwan Morgan announced he was entering the NBA draft, but he would not sign with an agent. However, on May 29, 2018, it was revealed that he had withdrawn from the draft and would return for his senior season.

Indiana departures
Name	Number	Pos.	Height	Weight	Year	Hometown	Reason for departure
Josh Newkirk	2	G	6'1"	195	RS senior	Raleigh, North Carolina	Graduated
Robert Johnson	4	G	6'3"	195	Senior	Richmond, Virginia	Graduated
Freddie McSwain Jr.	21	F	6'6"	220	Senior	Hinesville, Georgia	Graduated
Collin Hartman	30	F	6'7"	220	RS senior	Indianapolis, Indiana	Graduated
Tim Priller	35	C	6'9"	225	Senior	North Richland Hills, Texas	Graduated

=== Recruiting class ===
With the commitment of Romeo Langford on April 30, 2018, not only did Archie Miller recruit his first 5-star player, he also landed IU's first Indiana Mr. Basketball since Cody Zeller in 2011. He also signed two other finalists for the award, Rob Phinisee and Damezi Anderson. Miller rounded out the incoming class with the second best player from Ohio in Jerome Hunter, as well as another 4-star, Jake Forrester from Pennsylvania; this group of high school seniors comprised a Top 10 2018 recruiting class. Within the state of Indiana, there was a total of four 5- and 4-star 2018 recruits, three of whom committed to Indiana. The last addition to the team roster was made on May 3, 2018, when graduate transfer Evan Fitzner of Saint Mary's College claimed the final scholarship available.

College recruiting
Name	Hometown	School	Height	Weight	Commit date
Romeo Langford; SG	New Albany, IN	New Albany High School	6 ft 6 in (1.98 m)	195 lb (88 kg)	Apr 30, 2018
Romeo Langford; SG	Recruit ratings: Scout: Rivals: 247Sports: ESPN: (94)				
Jerome Hunter; SF	Pickerington, OH	Pickerington High School North	6 ft 7 in (2.01 m)	195 lb (88 kg)	Jul 17, 2017
Jerome Hunter; SF	Recruit ratings: Scout: Rivals: 247Sports: ESPN: (84)				
Damezi Anderson; SF	South Bend, IN	Riley High School	6 ft 6 in (1.98 m)	185 lb (84 kg)	Jul 17, 2017
Damezi Anderson; SF	Recruit ratings: Scout: Rivals: 247Sports: ESPN: (82)				
Rob Phinisee; PG	Lafayette, IN	McCutcheon High School	5 ft 11 in (1.80 m)	160 lb (73 kg)	Aug 19, 2017
Rob Phinisee; PG	Recruit ratings: Scout: Rivals: 247Sports: ESPN: (81)				
Jake Forrester; PF	Harrisburg, PA	Westtown School	6 ft 9 in (2.06 m)	215 lb (98 kg)	Sep 11, 2017
Jake Forrester; PF	Recruit ratings: Scout: Rivals: 247Sports: ESPN: (81)				
Overall recruit ranking: Scout: #9 Rivals: #7 247Sports: #9 ESPN: #11
Note: In many cases, Scout, Rivals, 247Sports, On3, and ESPN may conflict in their listings of height and weight.; In these cases, the average was taken. ESPN grades are on a 100-point scale.; Sources: "2018 Team Ranking". Rivals.

== Roster ==
2018–19 Indiana Hoosiers men's basketball team
Players
Coaches

Pos.	#	Name	Height	Weight	Year	Previous school	Hometown
G	0	Romeo Langford	6 ft 6 in (1.98 m)	215 lb (98 kg)	Fr	New Albany	New Albany, Indiana
G	1	Al Durham	6 ft 4 in (1.93 m)	181 lb (82 kg)	So	Berkmar	Lilburn, Georgia
G	2	Johnny Jager (W)	6 ft 0 in (1.83 m)	185 lb (84 kg)	Sr	Bloomington South	Bloomington, Indiana
F	3	Justin Smith	6 ft 7 in (2.01 m)	227 lb (103 kg)	So	Stevenson	Buffalo Grove, Illinois
F	4	Jake Forrester	6 ft 8 in (2.03 m)	218 lb (99 kg)	Fr	Westtown	Harrisburg, Pennsylvania
G	5	Quentin Taylor (W)	6 ft 2 in (1.88 m)	185 lb (84 kg)	Sr	Brebeuf	Indianapolis, Indiana
G	10	Rob Phinisee	6 ft 1 in (1.85 m)	182 lb (83 kg)	Fr	McCutcheon	Lafayette, Indiana
G	11	Devonte Green	6 ft 3 in (1.91 m)	185 lb (84 kg)	Jr	Long Island Lutheran	North Babylon, New York
F	13	Juwan Morgan (C)	6 ft 8 in (2.03 m)	232 lb (105 kg)	Sr	Waynesville	Waynesville, Missouri
F	15	Zach McRoberts (W/C)	6 ft 6 in (1.98 m)	210 lb (95 kg)	Sr	Carmel/Vermont	Carmel, Indiana
F	20	De'Ron Davis	6 ft 10 in (2.08 m)	255 lb (116 kg)	Jr	Overland	Aurora, Colorado
F	21	Jerome Hunter (injured) (redshirt)	6 ft 7 in (2.01 m)	214 lb (97 kg)	Fr	Pickerington North	Pickerington, Ohio
F	22	Clifton Moore	6 ft 10 in (2.08 m)	230 lb (104 kg)	So	Hatboro-Horsham	Horsham, Pennsylvania
F	23	Damezi Anderson	6 ft 7 in (2.01 m)	215 lb (98 kg)	Fr	Riley	South Bend, Indiana
G	24	Vijay Blackmon (W)	6 ft 2 in (1.88 m)	185 lb (84 kg)	Jr	Marion	Fort Wayne, Indiana
F	25	Race Thompson	6 ft 8 in (2.03 m)	228 lb (103 kg)	RS Fr	Armstrong	Plymouth, Minnesota
F	55	Evan Fitzner	6 ft 10 in (2.08 m)	225 lb (102 kg)	GS	Francis Parker/Saint Mary's College	San Diego, California

Head coach

- Archie Miller (NC State)

Assistant coach(es)

- Tom Ostrom (Minnesota)
- Ed Schilling (Miami (OH))
- Bruiser Flint (Saint Joseph's)

Legend

- (C) Team captain
- (S) Suspended
- (I) Ineligible
- (W) Walk-on
- Injured
- Current redshirt

Roster
Last update: 8-20-2018

== Schedule and results ==
The 2018–19 season marked the first time in Big Ten history that the teams played a 20-game conference schedule. The new schedule also included a regional component to increase the frequency of games among teams in similar areas. Over the course of a six-year cycle (12 playing opportunities), in-state rivals play each other 12 times, regional opponents play 10 times, and all other teams play nine times. Three in-state series are guaranteed home-and-homes; Illinois and Northwestern, Indiana and Purdue, and Michigan and Michigan State will always play twice.

Date time, TV	Rank^{#}	Opponent^{#}	Result	Record	High points	High rebounds	High assists	Site (attendance) city, state
Exhibition
November 1, 2018*; 7:00 pm, BTN Plus		Southern Indiana	W 96–62	–	14 – Anderson	5 – Tied	4 – Phinisee	Simon Skjodt Assembly Hall (N/A); Bloomington, IN
Regular season
November 6, 2018*; 6:30 pm, BTN		Chicago State	W 104–55	1–0	19 – Langford	8 – Morgan	5 – Phinisee	Simon Skjodt Assembly Hall (17,222); Bloomington, IN
November 9, 2018*; 8:00 pm, BTN		Montana State; Hardwood Showcase	W 80–35	2–0	14 – Morgan	11 – Morgan	5 – Green	Simon Skjodt Assembly Hall (17,222); Bloomington, IN
November 14, 2018*; 8:30 pm, FS1		No. 24 Marquette; Gavitt Tipoff Games	W 96–73	3–0	22 – Langford	8 – Morgan	8 – Phinisee	Simon Skjodt Assembly Hall (17,222); Bloomington, IN
November 18, 2018*; 3:30 pm, ESPN		at Arkansas; Hardwood Showcase	L 72–73	3–1	22 – Langford	10 – Langford	5 – Langford	Bud Walton Arena (17,456); Fayetteville, AR
November 20, 2018*; 7:00 pm, BTN		UT Arlington; Hardwood Showcase	W 78–64	4–1	23 – Morgan	10 – Morgan	4 – Tied	Simon Skjodt Assembly Hall (11,957); Bloomington, IN
November 23, 2018*; 7:00 pm, BTN Plus		UC Davis; Hardwood Showcase	W 76–62	5–1	31 – Morgan	10 – Morgan	8 – Phinisee	Simon Skjodt Assembly Hall (13,562); Bloomington, IN
November 27, 2018*; 9:30 pm, ESPN		at No. 3 Duke; ACC–Big Ten Challenge	L 69–90	5–2	13 – Langford	6 – Langford	3 – Tied	Cameron Indoor Stadium (9,314); Durham, NC
December 1, 2018; 1:00 pm, BTN		Northwestern	W 68–66	6–2 (1–0)	20 – Langford	12 – Morgan	3 – Morgan	Simon Skjodt Assembly Hall (17,222); Bloomington, IN
December 4, 2018; 7:00 pm, BTN		at Penn State	W 64–62	7–2 (2–0)	17 – Langford	9 – Smith	5 – Phinisee	Bryce Jordan Center (8,972); University Park, PA
December 8, 2018*; 2:30 pm, FOX		Louisville	W 68–67	8–2	21 – Langford	9 – Smith	4 – Langford	Simon Skjodt Assembly Hall (17,222); Bloomington, IN
December 15, 2018*; 3:45 pm, CBS	No. 25-T	vs. Butler; Crossroads Classic	W 71–68	9–2	35 – Morgan	7 – Langford	5 – Tied	Bankers Life Fieldhouse (18,743); Indianapolis, IN
December 19, 2018*; 7:00 pm, BTN	No. 22	Central Arkansas	W 86–53	10–2	19 – Green	11 – Langford	6 – Green	Simon Skjodt Assembly Hall (13,915); Bloomington, IN
December 22, 2018*; 6:00 pm, BTN	No. 22	Jacksonville	W 94–64	11–2	18 – Durham	10 – Morgan	10 – Morgan	Simon Skjodt Assembly Hall (14,975); Bloomington, IN
January 3, 2019; 7:00 pm, FS1	No. 21	Illinois; Rivalry	W 73–65	12–2 (3–0)	28 – Langford	10 – Morgan	3 – Tied	Simon Skjodt Assembly Hall (14,832); Bloomington, IN
January 6, 2019; 4:30 pm, CBS	No. 21	at No. 2 Michigan	L 63–74	12–3 (3–1)	25 – Morgan	9 – Smith	3 – Green	Crisler Center (12,707); Ann Arbor, MI
January 11, 2019; 7:00 pm, FS1	No. 22	at Maryland	L 75–78	12–4 (3–2)	28 – Langford	8 – Morgan	3 – Langford	Xfinity Center (15,017); College Park, MD
January 14, 2019; 6:30 pm, FS1	No. 25	Nebraska	L 51–66	12–5 (3–3)	18 – Langford	8 – Morgan	3 – Green	Simon Skjodt Assembly Hall (17,222); Bloomington, IN
January 19, 2019; 2:00 pm, FOX	No. 25	at Purdue; Rivalry/Indiana National Guard Governor's Cup	L 55–70	12–6 (3–4)	15 – Smith	6 – Morgan	5 – Morgan	Mackey Arena (14,804); West Lafayette, IN
January 22, 2019; 9:00 pm, BTN		at Northwestern	L 66–73	12–7 (3–5)	18 – Morgan	12 – Smith	3 – Tied	Welsh-Ryan Arena (7,039); Evanston, IL
January 25, 2019; 6:30 pm, FS1		No. 5 Michigan	L 46–69	12–8 (3–6)	16 – Morgan	12 – Morgan	5 – Durham	Simon Skjodt Assembly Hall (17,222); Bloomington, IN
January 30, 2019; 7:00 pm, BTN		at Rutgers	L 58–66	12–9 (3–7)	20 – Langford	7 – Morgan	3 – Phinisee	Louis Brown Athletic Center (5,973); Piscataway, NJ
February 2, 2019; 6:00 pm, ESPN		at No. 6 Michigan State; College Gameday	W 79–75 ^{OT}	13–9 (4–7)	19 – Langford	10 – Smith	5 – Green	Breslin Center (14,797); East Lansing, MI
February 7, 2019; 9:00 pm, ESPN		No. 20 Iowa	L 72–77	13–10 (4–8)	22 – Langford	5 – Tied	7 – Davis	Simon Skjodt Assembly Hall (17,222); Bloomington, IN
February 10, 2019; 1:00 pm, CBS		Ohio State	L 52–55	13–11 (4–9)	15 – Langford	13 – Morgan	3 – Tied	Simon Skjodt Assembly Hall (17,222); Bloomington, IN
February 16, 2019; 2:00 pm, ESPN2		at Minnesota	L 63–84	13–12 (4–10)	14 – Morgan	8 – Morgan	2 – Langford	Williams Arena (11,639); Minneapolis, MN
February 19, 2019; 7:00 pm, ESPN2		No. 15 Purdue; Rivalry/Indiana National Guard Governor's Cup	L 46–48	13–13 (4–11)	14 – Langford	11 – Morgan	2 – Tied	Simon Skjodt Assembly Hall (17,222); Bloomington, IN
February 22, 2019; 9:00 pm, FS1		at No. 21 Iowa	L 70–76 ^{OT}	13–14 (4–12)	15 – Morgan	7 – Tied	2 – Tied	Carver–Hawkeye Arena (15,056); Iowa City, IA
February 26, 2019; 9:00 pm, ESPN		No. 19 Wisconsin	W 75–73 ^{2OT}	14–14 (5–12)	22 – Langford	15 – Morgan	4 – Phinisee	Simon Skjodt Assembly Hall (17,222); Bloomington, IN
March 2, 2019; 12:00 pm, FOX		No. 6 Michigan State	W 63–62	15–14 (6–12)	24 – Smith	11 – Morgan	5 – Phinisee	Simon Skjodt Assembly Hall (17,222); Bloomington, IN
March 7, 2019; 8:00 pm, FS1		at Illinois; Rivalry	W 92–74	16–14 (7–12)	20 – Morgan	9 – Morgan	5 – Phinisee	State Farm Center (14,033); Champaign, IL
March 10, 2019; 12:00 pm, BTN		Rutgers	W 89–73	17–14 (8–12)	25 – Morgan	7 – Morgan	3 – Tied	Simon Skjodt Assembly Hall (17,222); Bloomington, IN
Big Ten tournament
March 14, 2019; 12:30 pm, BTN	(9)	vs. (8) Ohio State; Second Round	L 75–79	17–15	26 – Green	7 – Morgan	5 – Langford	United Center (16,207); Chicago, IL
NIT
March 19, 2019*; 7:00 pm, ESPN	(1)	(8) Saint Francis (PA); First Round – Indiana Bracket	W 89–72	18–15	28 – Morgan	9 – Smith	6 – Green	Simon Skjodt Assembly Hall (5,431); Bloomington, IN
March 23, 2019*; 12:00 pm, ESPN	(1)	(5) Arkansas; Second Round – Indiana Bracket	W 63–60	19–15	18 – Green	11 – Green	5 – Phinisee	Simon Skjodt Assembly Hall (12,225); Bloomington, IN
March 26, 2019*; 7:00 pm, ESPN	(1)	(6) Wichita State; Quarterfinals – Indiana Bracket	L 63–73	19–16	21 – Morgan	7 – Tied	4 – Tied	Simon Skjodt Assembly Hall (10,312); Bloomington, IN
*Non-conference game. ^{#}Rankings from AP Poll. (#) Tournament seedings in parentheses. All times are in Eastern Time.

== Player statistics ==
Individual player statistics (final)
			Minutes		Scoring		Total FGs			3-point FGs			Free-throws			Rebounds							
Player	GP	GS	Tot	Avg	Pts	Avg	FG	FGA	Pct	3FG	3FA	Pct	FT	FTA	Pct	Off	Def	Tot	Avg	A	Stl	Blk	TO
Anderson, Damezi	21	0	201	9.6	31	1.5	12	43	27.9	7	30	23.3	0	1	0.0	3	21	24	1.1	8	3	0	11
Blackmon, Vijay	7	0	13	1.9	7	1.0	3	5	60.0	1	2	50.0	0	0	0.0	0	1	1	0.1	1	0	0	1
Davis, De'Ron	30	3	407	13.6	161	5.4	60	100	60.0	0	0	0.0	41	71	57.7	25	51	76	2.5	27	13	18	30
Durham, Al	34	30	978	28.8	282	8.3	94	233	40.3	40	115	34.8	54	73	74.0	6	59	65	1.9	54	16	9	42
Fitzner, Evan	31	0	356	11.5	109	3.5	41	99	41.4	17	55	30.9	10	15	66.7	15	48	63	2.0	12	9	4	11
Forrester, Jake	13	0	56	4.3	27	2.1	12	22	54.5	0	0	0.0	3	9	33.3	6	11	17	1.3	0	1	4	5
Green, Devonte	28	9	706	25.2	263	9.4	88	219	40.2	48	117	41.0	39	53	73.6	6	9	96	3.4	85	38	13	63
Hunter, Jerome	0	0	0	0.0	0	0.0	0	0	0.0	0	0	0.0	0	0	0.0	0	0	0	0.0	0	0	0	0
Jager, Johnny	7	0	16	2.3	2	0.3	0	2	0.0	0	2	0.0	2	4	50.0	0	2	2	0.3	1	2	0	1
Langford, Romeo	32	32	1091	34.1	528	16.5	177	395	44.8	34	125	27.2	140	194	72.2	45	127	172	5.4	75	25	26	68
McRoberts, Zach	26	5	357	13.7	20	0.8	8	26	30.8	4	19	21.1	0	0	0.0	7	48	55	2.1	14	1	14	8
Moore, Clifton	15	0	62	4.1	19	1.3	7	11	63.6	0	0	0.0	5	12	41.7	7	18	25	1.7	4	3	3	4
Morgan, Juwan	35	35	1044	29.8	544	15.5	215	385	55.8	26	88	29.5	88	136	64.7	88	199	287	8.2	65	41	54	68
Phinisee, Robert	32	29	874	27.3	218	6.8	78	216	36.1	27	87	31.0	35	53	66.0	12	92	104	3.3	94	35	4	41
Smith, Justin	35	32	866	24.7	287	8.2	122	246	49.6	7	32	21.9	36	70	51.4	61	95	156	4.5	28	22	15	65
Taylor, Quentin	7	0	10	1.4	0	0.0	0	2	0.0	0	1	0.0	0	0	0.0	0	3	3	0.4	0	1	0	1
Thompson, Race	9	0	63	7.0	6	0.7	2	5	40.0	0	3	0.0	2	4	50.0	5	14	19	2.1	1	3	3	0
Total	35	-	7100	-	2504	71.5	919	2009	45.7	211	676	31.2	455	695	65.5	341	931	1379	39.4	469	226	154	433
Opponents	35	-	7100	-	2374	67.8	862	2057	41.9	260	785	33.1	390	601	64.9	363	871	1349	38.5	471	204	135	439

Legend
GP	Games played	GS	Games started	Avg	Average per game
FG	Field-goals made	FGA	Field-goal attempts	Off	Offensive rebounds
Def	Defensive rebounds	A	Assists	TO	Turnovers
Blk	Blocks	Stl	Steals	High	Team high

== Rankings ==
Ranking movements Legend: ██ Increase in ranking ██ Decrease in ranking — = Not ranked RV = Received votes
	Week																			
Poll	Pre	1	2	3	4	5	6	7	8	9	10	11	12	13	14	15	16	17	18	Final
AP	RV	RV	RV	RV	RV	25	22	23	21	22	25	—	—	—	—	—	—	—	—	Not released
Coaches	RV	^	RV	RV	RV	RV	RV	25	22	24	25	RV	—	—	—	—	—	—	—	—

*AP does not release post-NCAA Tournament rankings.
^Coaches did not release a week 2 poll.

== See also ==
- 2018–19 Indiana Hoosiers women's basketball team
