= 2019 Big Ten men's basketball tournament =

- Classification: Division I
- Season: 2018–19
- Teams: 14
- Site: United Center; Chicago, Illinois
- Champions: Michigan State (6th title)
- Winning coach: Tom Izzo (6th title)
- MVP: Cassius Winston (Michigan State)
- Attendance: 122,242
- Television: BTN, CBS

2018–19 Big Ten Conference men's basketball standings
	Conf.				Overall
Team	W		L	PCT	W		L	PCT
No. 5 Michigan State †	16	–	4	.800	32	–	7	.821
No. 13 Purdue	16	–	4	.800	26	–	10	.722
No. 8 Michigan	15	–	5	.750	30	–	7	.811
No. 21 Wisconsin	14	–	6	.700	23	–	11	.676
Maryland	13	–	7	.650	23	–	11	.676
Iowa	10	–	10	.500	23	–	12	.657
Minnesota	9	–	11	.450	22	–	14	.611
Ohio State	8	–	12	.400	20	–	15	.571
Indiana	8	–	12	.400	19	–	16	.543
Penn State	7	–	13	.350	14	–	18	.438
Illinois	7	–	13	.350	12	–	21	.364
Rutgers	7	–	13	.350	14	–	17	.452
Nebraska	6	–	14	.300	19	–	17	.528
Northwestern	4	–	16	.200	13	–	19	.406
† 2019 Big Ten tournament winner Rankings from AP poll

The 2019 Big Ten men's basketball tournament was the postseason men's basketball tournament for the Big Ten Conference of the 2018–19 NCAA Division I men's basketball season. The tournament returned to its more traditional Midwest roots as it was held at the United Center in Chicago, Illinois. The tournament was held from March 13 through March 17, 2019.

Michigan State defeated Michigan 65–60 in the championship game to win the tournament, marking the school's sixth tournament championship. As a result, they received the conference's automatic bid to the NCAA tournament.

== Seeds ==
All 14 Big Ten schools participated in the tournament. Teams were seeded by conference record, with a tiebreaker system used to seed teams with identical conference records. The top 10 teams received a first round bye and the top four teams received a double bye. Tiebreaking procedures remain unchanged from the 2018 tournament.

Seed	School	Conf.	Tiebreak 1	Tiebreak 2
1	Michigan State	16–4	1–1 vs. Purdue	2–0 vs. Michigan
2	Purdue	16–4	1–1 vs. Michigan St	0–1 vs. Michigan
3	Michigan	15–5		
4	Wisconsin	14–6		
5	Maryland	13–7		
6	Iowa	10–10		
7	Minnesota	9–11		
8	Ohio State	8–12	1–0 vs. Indiana	
9	Indiana	8–12	0–1 vs. Ohio State	
10	Penn State	7–13	3–1 vs. Illinois/Rutgers	
11	Illinois	7–13	1–2 vs. Penn State/Rutgers	1–1 vs. Mich St/Purdue
12	Rutgers	7–13	1–2 vs. Penn State/Illinois	0–3 vs. Mich St/Purdue
13	Nebraska	6–14		
14	Northwestern	4–16		

== Schedule ==
Session	Game	Time*	Matchup^{#}	Television	Attendance	Score
First round – Wednesday, March 13
1	1	5:30 pm	No. 13 Nebraska vs. No. 12 Rutgers	BTN	16,473	68–61
1	2	8:00 pm	No. 14 Northwestern vs. No. 11 Illinois	BTN	16,473	69–74 (OT)
Second round – Thursday, March 14
2	3	11:30 am	No. 9 Indiana vs. No. 8 Ohio State	BTN	16,207	75–79
2	4	2:00 pm	No. 13 Nebraska vs. No. 5 Maryland	BTN	16,207	69–61
3	5	6:00 pm	No. 10 Penn State vs. No. 7 Minnesota	BTN	16,535	72–77 (OT)
3	6	8:30 pm	No. 11 Illinois vs. No. 6 Iowa	BTN	16,535	62−83
Quarterfinals – Friday, March 15
4	7	11:30 am	No. 8 Ohio State vs. No. 1 Michigan State	BTN	17,369	70−77
4	8	2:00 pm	No. 13 Nebraska vs. No. 4 Wisconsin	BTN	17,369	62–66
5	9	6:00 pm	No. 7 Minnesota vs. No. 2 Purdue	BTN	18,575	75–73
5	10	8:30 pm	No. 6 Iowa vs. No. 3 Michigan	BTN	18,575	53–74
Semifinals – Saturday, March 16
6	11	12:00 pm	No. 1 Michigan State vs. No. 4 Wisconsin	CBS	18,468	67–55
6	12	2:30 pm	No. 7 Minnesota vs. No. 3 Michigan	CBS	18,468	49–76
Championship – Sunday, March 17
7	13	2:30 pm	No. 1 Michigan State vs. No. 3 Michigan	CBS	18,615	65–60

*Game times in Central Time. #Rankings denote tournament seeding.

== Bracket ==
First round Wednesday, March 13; BTN
12	Rutgers	61
13	Nebraska	68
11	Illinois	74*
14	Northwestern	69

Second round Thursday, March 14; BTN
8	Ohio State	79
9	Indiana	75
5	Maryland	61
13	Nebraska	69
7	Minnesota	77*
10	Penn State	72
6	Iowa	83
11	Illinois	62

Quarterfinals; Friday, March 15; BTN
1	Michigan State	77
8	Ohio State	70
4	Wisconsin	66
13	Nebraska	62
2	Purdue	73
7	Minnesota	75
3	Michigan	74
6	Iowa	53

Semifinals; Saturday, March 16; CBS
1	Michigan State	67
4	Wisconsin	55
7	Minnesota	49
3	Michigan	76

Championship; Sunday, March 17; CBS
1	Michigan State	65
3	Michigan	60

* denotes overtime period

== Game summaries ==
=== First round ===
BTN

March 13
5:30 pm

No. 13 Nebraska 68, No. 12 Rutgers 61
Scoring by half: 26−25, 42−36
Pts: James Palmer Jr., 34; Rebs: Isaiah Roby, 6 Asts: Glynn Watson Jr., 5	Pts: Eugene Omoruyi, 16; Rebs: Myles Johnson, 11; Asts: Eugene Omoruyi, 5

United Center
Chicago, IL
Attendance: 16,473
Referees: Larry Scirott, Paul Szelc, Kelly Pfieffer

BTN

March 13
8:00 pm

No. 14 Northwestern 69, No. 11 Illinois 74 (OT)
Scoring by half: 27−30, 34−31 Overtime: 8−13
Pts: A.J. Turner, 21; Rebs: Anthony Gaines, 9 Asts: A.J. Turner, 5	Pts: Giorgi Bezhanishvili, 26; Rebs: Andres Feliz, 10; Asts: Andres Feliz, 6

United Center
Chicago, IL
Attendance: 16,473
Referees: Terry Oglesby, Terry Wymer, Chris Beaver

=== Second round ===
BTN

March 14
11:30 am

No. 9 Indiana 75, No. 8 Ohio State 79
Scoring by half: 28−35, 47−44
Pts: Devonte Green, 26; Rebs: Juwan Morgan, 7 Asts: Romeo Langford, 5	Pts: Keyshawn Woods, 18; Rebs: Kaleb Wesson, 13; Asts: C. J. Jackson, 5

United Center
Chicago, IL
Attendance: 16,207
Referees: Bo Boroski, Larry Scriotto, Bill Ek

BTN

March 14
2:00 pm

No. 13 Nebraska 69, No. 5 Maryland 61
Scoring by half: 32−20, 37−41
Pts: James Palmer Jr., 21; Rebs: Tanner Borchardt, 9 Asts: 3 tied, 3	Pts: Anthony Cowan Jr., 18; Rebs: Bruno Fernando, 8 Asts: Darryl Morsell, 5

United Center
Chicago, IL
Attendance: 16,207
Referees: Terry Wymer, Steve McJunkins, Rob Kueneman

BTN

March 14
6:00 pm

No. 10 Penn State 72, No. 7 Minnesota 77 (OT)
Scoring by half: 34−30, 27−31 Overtime: 11−16
Pts: Lamar Stevens, 24; Rebs: 2 tied, 7 Asts: Josh Reaves, 5	Pts: Amir Coffey, 22; Rebs: Jordan Murphy, 14; Asts: 3 tied, 5

United Center
Chicago, IL
Attendance: 16,535
Referees: Terry Oglesby, Paul Szelc, Rob Riley

BTN

March 14
8:30 pm

No. 11 Illinois 62, No. 6 Iowa 83
Scoring by half: 31−37, 31−46
Pts: Giorgi Bezhanishvili, 12; Rebs: Giorgi Bezhanishvili, 6 Asts: Ayo Dosunmu, 6	Pts: Nicholas Baer, 17; Rebs: Joe Wieskamp, 7 Asts: Connor McCaffery, 8

United Center
Chicago, IL
Attendance: 16,535
Referees: D.J. Carstensen, Kelly Pfeifer, Courtney Green

=== Quarterfinals ===
BTN

March 15
11:30 am

No. 1 Michigan State 77, No. 8 Ohio State 70
Scoring by half: 36−30, 40−41
Pts: Cassius Winston, 18; Rebs: Cassius Winston, 7 Asts: Kenny Goins, 6	Pts: Keyshawn Woods, 16; Rebs: 5 tied, 3 Asts: 2 tied, 2

United Center
Chicago, IL
Referees: Terry Oglesby, Paul Szelc, Rob Riley

BTN

March 15
2:00 pm

No. 4 Wisconsin 66, No. 13 Nebraska 62
Scoring by half: 34–29, 32–32
Pts: 2 tied, 14; Rebs: Ethan Happ, 7 Asts: 2 tied, 4	Pts: Glynn Watson Jr., 23; Rebs: Isaiah Roby, 6 Asts: Glynn Watson Jr., 3

United Center
Chicago, IL
Referees: D.J. Carstensen, Kelly Pfeifer, Bill Ek

BTN

March 15
6:00 pm

No. 2 Purdue 73, No. 7 Minnesota 75
Scoring by half: 39-42, 34-33
Pts: Matt Haarms, 16; Rebs: Trevion Williams, 9 Asts: Ryan Cline, 8	Pts: Jordan Murphy, 27; Rebs: Daniel Oturu, 10; Asts: 2 Tied, 4

United Center
Chicago, IL
Attendance: 17,369
Referees: Terry Wymer, Courtney Green, Lamont Simpson

BTN

March 15
8:30 pm

No. 3 Michigan 74, No. 6 Iowa 53
Scoring by half: 40-27, 34-26
Pts: Ignas Brazdeikis, 15; Rebs: Jon Teske, 10; Asts: Zavier Simpson, 11	Pts: 2 Tied, 14; Rebs: Tyler Cook, 6 Asts: Jordan Bohannon, 3

United Center
Chicago, IL
Attendance: 18,575
Referees: Bo Boroski, Larry Scirotto, Rob Kueneman

=== Semifinals ===
CBS

March 16
12:00 pm

No. 1 Michigan State 67, No. 4 Wisconsin 55
Scoring by half: 35-27, 32-28
Pts: Cassius Winston, 21; Rebs: Kenny Goins, 12; Asts: Cassius Winston, 6	Pts: Ethan Happ, 20; Rebs: Ethan Happ, 6 Asts: 2 tied, 3

United Center
Chicago, IL
Attendance: 18,468
Referees: Terry Oglesby, Kelly Pfeifer, Courtney Green

CBS

March 16
2:30 pm

No. 7 Minnesota 49, No. 3 Michigan 76
Scoring by half: 19-38, 30-38
Pts: Amir Coffey, 14; Rebs: Jordan Murphy, 6 Asts: Dupree McBrayer, 7	Pts: Isaiah Livers, 21; Rebs: Jon Teske, 8 Asts: Zavier Simpson, 9

United Center
Chicago, IL
Attendance: 18,468
Referees: D.J. Carstensen, Terry Wymer, Rob Kueneman

=== Championship ===
CBS

March 17
2:30 pm

No. 1 Michigan State 65, No. 3 Michigan 60
Scoring by half: 23-31, 42-29
Pts: Matt McQuaid, 27; Rebs: Xavier Tillman, 12; Asts: Cassius Winston, 11	Pts: Ignas Brazdeikis, 19; Rebs: Jon Teske, 10; Asts: Zavier Simpson, 10

United Center
Chicago, IL
Attendance: 18,615
Referees: Bo Boroski, Larry Scirotto, Paul Szelc

== All-Tournament Team ==
- Cassius Winston, Michigan State – Big Ten tournament Most Outstanding Player
- Ignas Brazdeikis, Michigan
- Zavier Simpson, Michigan
- Jordan Murphy, Minnesota
- James Palmer Jr., Nebraska
