= 2019–20 Summit League men's basketball season =

- League: NCAA Division I
- Sport: Basketball
- Duration: November 2019 through March 2020
- Teams: 9

Regular Season

Tournament

Summit League men's basketball seasons
- ← 2018–19 2020–21 →

2019–20 Summit League men's basketball standings
	Conf.				Overall
Team	W		L	PCT	W		L	PCT
North Dakota State †	13	–	3	.813	25	–	8	.758
South Dakota State	13	–	3	.813	22	–	10	.688
South Dakota	10	–	6	.625	20	–	12	.625
Oral Roberts	9	–	7	.563	17	–	14	.548
Omaha	9	–	7	.563	16	–	16	.500
North Dakota	7	–	9	.438	15	–	18	.455
Purdue Fort Wayne	6	–	10	.375	14	–	19	.424
Denver	3	–	13	.188	7	–	24	.226
Western Illinois	2	–	14	.125	5	–	21	.192
† 2020 Summit League Tournament winner

The 2019–20 Summit League men's basketball season began in October 2019 with practices, followed by the start of the 2019-20 NCAA Division I men's basketball season in early November. Conference play began in late December, and concludes on the final day of February 2020. The 2020 Summit League men's basketball tournament begins and concludes in early March 2020, and leads into the 2020 NCAA Division I men's basketball tournament.

== Head coaches ==
=== Head coach changes ===
Team	Departing coach	Reason	New head coach	Previous job
North Dakota	Brian Jones	Took offer as Assistant HC at Illinois St.	Paul Sather	HC at Northern St. (DII)
South Dakota State	T. J. Otzelberger	Took offer as HC of UNLV	Eric Henderson	Assistant at South Dakota State

=== Head coach records ===
As of beginning of 2019–20 season.

Team	Coach	Seasons w/ team*	DI Record w/ team	All-time Summit record	Conference regular season titles	NCAA DI Tournament appearances	NCAA DI Tournament record
Denver	Rodney Billups	4	39–51 (.433)	19–27 (.413)	0	0	0–0 (.000)
North Dakota	Paul Sather	1	0–0 (.000)	0–0 (.000)	0	0	0–0 (.000)
North Dakota State	David Richman	6	96–67 (.589)	45–33 (.577)	1 (2015)	2 (2015, 2019)	1–2 (.333)
Omaha	Derrin Hansen	15 (9 DI, 6 DII)	115–130 (.469)	52–56 (.481)	0	0	0–0 (.000)
Oral Roberts	Paul Mills	3	22–41 (.349)	12–18 (.400)	0	0	0–0 (.000)
Purdue Fort Wayne	Jon Coffman	6	95–66 (.590)	45–33 (.577)	1 (2016)	0	0–0 (.000)
South Dakota	Todd Lee	2	13–17 (.433)	7–9 (.438)	0	0	0–0 (.000)
South Dakota State	Eric Henderson	1	0–0 (.000)	0–0 (.000)	0	0	0–0 (.000)
Western Illinois	Billy Wright	6	48–94 (.338)	18–60 (.231)	0	0	0–0 (.000)
*2019–20 season included, and seasons in other divisions marked.

== Preseason ==
=== Preseason Conference Poll ===
The Summit League released a poll in early October, which was voted on by a panel of the 9 head coaches, sports information directors and select media members. With a majority of the 34 voters, North Dakota State was deemed the favorite.

Rank	Team	Points	First place votes
1	North Dakota State	526	23
2	South Dakota	457	6
3	Oral Roberts	404	3
4	Omaha	369	0
5	South Dakota State	300	2
6	Purdue Fort Wayne	224	0
7	Western Illinois	188	0
8	North Dakota	164	0
9	Denver	113	0

=== Preseason All-Summit League teams ===
The Summit League released its preseason All-Summit League first team and second team. A Preseason Player of the Year was also announced, and automatically is gifted a spot on first team.

Honor	Player	Year	School
2019–20 Preseason Summit League Player of the Year	Stanley Umude	Junior	South Dakota
2019–20 Preseason All-Summit League First Team	Emmanuel Nzekwesi	Senior	Oral Roberts
2019–20 Preseason All-Summit League First Team	Kevin Obanor	Sophomore	Oral Roberts
2019–20 Preseason All-Summit League First Team	Vinnie Shahid	Senior	North Dakota State
2019–20 Preseason All-Summit League First Team	Triston Simpson	Senior	South Dakota
2019–20 Preseason All-Summit League First Team	Stanley Umude	Junior	South Dakota
2019–20 Preseason All-Summit League First Team	Kobe Webster	Junior	Western Illinois
2019–20 Preseason All-Summit League Second Team	Tyler Hagedorn	Senior	South Dakota
2019–20 Preseason All-Summit League Second Team	JT Gibson	Senior	Omaha
2019–20 Preseason All-Summit League Second Team	Matt Hobla	Senior	Purdue Fort Wayne
2019–20 Preseason All-Summit League Second Team	Matt Pile	Junior	Omaha
2019–20 Preseason All-Summit League Second Team	Tyson Ward	Senior	North Dakota State

== Regular season ==
=== Early Season Tournaments ===
Seven of the nine Summit League teams participated in early season event, which could be a multi-team event, or a tournament. The two teams who didn't participate in one of these tournaments were Oral Roberts and Western Illinois.

Team	Tournament/Event	Finish
Omaha	Cayman Islands Classic-Mainland	1st (of 4)
South Dakota	Collegiate Hoops Roadshow	N/A
South Dakota	Outrigger Hotels Rainbow Classic	1st (of 4)
North Dakota State	Islander Invitational	2nd (of 4)
South Dakota State	Indiana Challenge	N/A
North Dakota	Minnesota MTE	N/A
North Dakota	Hilton Garden Inn FGCU Classic	N/A
Purdue Fort Wayne	Ohio State Classic	N/A
Denver	Cable Car Classic	T-2 (of 4)

=== Summit League Challenges ===
The Summit League played in both the Summit League/WAC Challenge and the Big Sky/Summit Challenges. The games and results are as follows:

==== Big Sky/Summit Challenge ====
Away team	Score	Home team	Date and time
North Dakota State	70–53	Idaho	Nov. 26, 10 p.m. ET
South Dakota State	70–77	Montana State	Dec. 5, 10 p.m.
North Dakota	70–77	Montana	Dec. 6, 9 p.m.
North Dakota	82–98	Eastern Washington	Dec. 8, 6:30 p.m.
Montana State	65–79	North Dakota State	Dec. 16, 8 p.m.
Omaha	56–97	Eastern Washington	Dec. 17, 9 p.m.
Montana	82–87 (OT)	Omaha	Dec. 21, 1 p.m.
Idaho	57–85	South Dakota State	Dec. 21, 8 p.m.

The Summit League won a total of 4 of the 8 games, therefore splitting the challenge.

==== Summit League/WAC Challenge ====
After last year's loss in the Summit League/WAC Challenge by a score of 6–3, the Summit League looked to win the challenge this year.

Away team	Score	Home team	Date and time
South Dakota State	93–91 (2OT)	Cal State Bakersfield	Nov. 9, 10 p.m.
Utah Valley	68–62	North Dakota State	Nov. 23, 6 p.m.
South Dakota	84–83	Cal Baptist	Nov. 27, 10 p.m.
Purdue Fort Wayne	71–60	Grand Canyon	Nov. 30, 8 p.m.
Western Illinois	67–68	Kansas City	Nov. 30, 8 p.m.
New Mexico State	72–67	Denver	Dec. 10, 9 p.m.
UTRGV	82–92	Omaha	Dec. 15, 1:30 p.m.
Oral Roberts	97–59	Chicago State	Dec. 17, 8 p.m.

The Summit League won this year's Summit League/WAC Challenge, a total of 5 games to 3 games.

=== Player of the Week ===
Each Monday during the season, the Summit League offices chose one or maybe two players to be named Player of the Week.

Week	Player	Team
November 11, 2019	Douglas Wilson	South Dakota State
November 18, 2019	Tyler Hagedorn	South Dakota
November 25, 2019	J.T. Gibson	Omaha
December 2, 2019	Jarred Godfrey	Purdue Fort Wayne
December 9, 2019	Rocky Kreuser	North Dakota State
December 16, 2019	Vinnie Shahid	North Dakota State (2)
December 23, 2019	Marlon Stewart	North Dakota
December 30, 2019	Matt Pile	Omaha (2)
December 30, 2019	Zion Young	Western Illinois
January 6, 2020	Marlon Stewart (2)	North Dakota (2)
January 13, 2020	Deondre Burns	Oral Roberts
January 20, 2020	Tyson Ward	North Dakota State (3)
January 27, 2020	Marlon Stewart (3)	North Dakota (3)
February 3, 2020	Tyler Hagedorn (2)	South Dakota (2)
February 10, 2020	Vinnie Shahid (2)	North Dakota State (4)
February 17, 2020		
February 24, 2020		
March 2, 2020		

==== Athlete of the Month ====
In addition to the player of week, the Summit League also announces an athlete of the month, across of all sports, but separated by gender. So far, two players have been given the honor: Tyler Hagedorn in November, Emmanuel Nzekwesi in December, and Tyler Hagedorn again in January.

=== Conference matrix ===
This table summarizes the head to head results of each team in the Summit League. Each team plays 16 games, a home and away against all teams. Updated through 2/7.

	Denver	North Dakota	North Dakota State	Omaha	Oral Roberts	Purdue Fort Wayne	South Dakota	South Dakota State	Western Illinois
vs. Denver	–	2–0	2–0	0–1	1–0	1–0	2–0	1–0	1–0
vs. North Dakota	0–2	–	1–0	1–0	1–1	1–1	1–0	1–0	0–1
vs. North Dakota State	0–2	0–1	–	0–1	1–1	0–1	0–1	1–0	0–2
vs. Omaha	1–0	0–1	1–0	–	0–1	0–1	2–0	1–1	0–1
vs. Oral Roberts	0–1	1–1	1–1	1–0	–	0–1	1–0	2–0	0–1
vs. Purdue Fort Wayne	0–1	1–1	1–0	1–0	1–0	–	1–1	1–0	0–2
vs. South Dakota	0–2	0–1	1–0	0–2	0–1	1–1	–	0–1	1–0
vs. South Dakota State	0–1	0–1	0–1	1–1	0–2	0–1	1–0	–	0–2
vs. Western Illinois	0–1	1–0	2–0	1–0	1–0	2–0	0–1	2–0	–
Total	1–10	5–6	9–2	5–5	5–6	5–6	8–3	9–2	2–9

== Postseason ==
=== Summit League Conference tournament ===
Quarterfinals; March 7 & 8
1	North Dakota State	71
8	Denver	69
4	Oral Roberts	79
5	Omaha	52
2	South Dakota State	74
7	Purdue Fort Wayne	77
3	South Dakota	71
6	North Dakota	74

Semifinals; March 9
1	North Dakota State	75
4	Oral Roberts	69
7	Purdue Fort Wayne	56
6	North Dakota	73

Final; March 10
1	North Dakota State	89
6	North Dakota	53
