= 2019–20 South Dakota Coyotes men's basketball team =

American college basketball season

2019–20 South Dakota Coyotes men's basketball

Rainbow Classic champions
- Conference: Summit League
- Record: 20–12 (10–6 The Summit)
- Head coach: Todd Lee (2nd season)
- Assistant coaches: Gameli Ahelegbe; Brad Davidson; Luke DallaRiva
- Home arena: Sanford Coyote Sports Center

2019–20 Summit League men's basketball standings
| | Conf. | | | | Overall |
| Team | W | | L | PCT | W | | L | PCT |
|---|---|---|---|---|---|---|---|---|
| North Dakota State † | 13 | – | 3 | .813 | 25 | – | 8 | .758 |
| South Dakota State | 13 | – | 3 | .813 | 22 | – | 10 | .688 |
| South Dakota | 10 | – | 6 | .625 | 20 | – | 12 | .625 |
| Oral Roberts | 9 | – | 7 | .563 | 17 | – | 14 | .548 |
| Omaha | 9 | – | 7 | .563 | 16 | – | 16 | .500 |
| North Dakota | 7 | – | 9 | .438 | 15 | – | 18 | .455 |
| Purdue Fort Wayne | 6 | – | 10 | .375 | 14 | – | 19 | .424 |
| Denver | 3 | – | 13 | .188 | 7 | – | 24 | .226 |
| Western Illinois | 2 | – | 14 | .125 | 5 | – | 21 | .192 |
† 2020 Summit League Tournament winner

The 2019–20 South Dakota Coyotes men's basketball team represented the University of South Dakota during the 2019–20 NCAA Division I men's basketball season. The Coyotes, led by second-year head coach Todd Lee, played their home games at the Sanford Coyote Sports Center in Vermillion, South Dakota as members of the Summit League. They finished the season 20–12, 10–6 in Summit League play, to finish in third place. They lost in the quarterfinals of the Summit League tournament to North Dakota.

== Previous season ==
The Coyotes finished the 2018–19 season 13–17, 7–9 in Summit League play, to finish in sixth place. They lost to Purdue Fort Wayne in the first round of the Summit League.

== Roster ==
2019–20 South Dakota Coyotes men's basketball team
Players
Coaches

| Pos. | # | Name | Height | Weight | Year | Hometown |
|---|---|---|---|---|---|---|
| G | 0 | Stanley Umude | 6 ft 6 in (1.98 m) | 210 lb (95 kg) | Jr | San Antonio, TX |
| G | 1 | Ty Chisom | 6 ft 4 in (1.93 m) | 190 lb (86 kg) | Jr | Chicago, IL |
| F | 2 | Simeon Jovic | 6 ft 9 in (2.06 m) | 210 lb (95 kg) | RS Fr | Novi Sad, Serbia |
| G | 3 | Triston Simpson | 6 ft 2 in (1.88 m) | 185 lb (84 kg) | Sr | Lincoln, NE |
| G | 4 | A.J. Plitzuweit | 6 ft 2 in (1.88 m) | 170 lb (77 kg) | So | Vermillion, SD |
| G | 5 | Kruz Perrott-Hunt | 6 ft 3 in (1.91 m) | 195 lb (88 kg) | Fr | Auckland, New Zealand |
| G | 10 | Cody Kelley | 5 ft 11 in (1.8 m) | 190 lb (86 kg) | Sr | Gillette, WY |
| G | 11 | Caden Hoffman | 6 ft 0 in (1.83 m) | 175 lb (79 kg) | RS Fr | Scottsdale, AZ |
| F | 12 | Hunter Goodrick | 6 ft 7 in (2.01 m) | 215 lb (98 kg) | Fr | Sydney, Australia |
| F | 13 | Matt Johns | 6 ft 8 in (2.03 m) | 230 lb (104 kg) | So | Geelong, Australia |
| G | 20 | Brandon Armstrong | 6 ft 5 in (1.96 m) | 205 lb (93 kg) | Sr | San Antonio, TX |
| G | 22 | Tyler Peterson | 6 ft 4 in (1.93 m) | 210 lb (95 kg) | Sr | Lino Lakes, MN |
| G | 24 | Kanon Koster | 6 ft 4 in (1.93 m) | 220 lb (100 kg) | So | Kearney, NE |
| F | 25 | Tyler Hagedorn | 6 ft 10 in (2.08 m) | 230 lb (104 kg) | RS Sr | Norfolk, NE |
| F | 34 | Tasos Kamateros | 6 ft 8 in (2.03 m) | 240 lb (109 kg) | Fr | Athens, Greece |
| F | 45 | Brady Heiman | 6 ft 11 in (2.11 m) | 210 lb (95 kg) | So | Springfield, NE |

Head coach

- Todd Lee (South Dakota)

Assistant coach(es)

- Gameli Ahelegbe (Minnesota State)
- Brad Davidson (North Dakota)
- Luke DallaRiva (San Diego)

Legend

- (C) Team captain
- (S) Suspended
- (I) Ineligible
- (W) Walk-on
- Injured
- Current redshirt

Roster
Last update: June 17, 2025

== Schedule and results ==
| Date time, TV | Rank^{#} | Opponent^{#} | Result | Record | Site (attendance) city, state |
Exhibition
| November 2, 2019; 6:00 p.m. | | Concordia (St. Paul) | W 72–61 | | Sanford Coyote Sports Center (1,532); Vermillion, SD |
Regular season
| November 8, 2019*; 8:30 p.m. | | vs. Pacific; Rainbow Classic | W 72–62 | 1–0 | Stan Sheriff Center (5,093); Honolulu, HI |
| November 10, 2019*; 9:00 p.m. | | at Hawaii; Rainbow Classic | W 81–75 | 2–0 | Stan Sheriff Center (5,200); Honolulu, HI |
| November 11, 2019*; 8:30 p.m. | | vs. Florida A&M; Rainbow Classic | W 85–82 | 3–0 | Stan Sheriff Center (4,935); Honolulu, HI |
| November 15, 2019*; 7:00 p.m. | | Texas Southern | W 88–69 | 4–0 | Sanford Coyote Sports Center (2,096); Vermillion, SD |
| November 18, 2019*; 7:00 p.m. | | SIU Edwardsville | W 71–56 | 5–0 | Sanford Coyote Sports Center (1,833); Vermillion, SD |
| November 22, 2019*; 8:00 p.m., SECN/ESPN3 | | at Arkansas | L 56–77 | 5–1 | Bud Walton Arena (12,581); Fayetteville, AR |
| November 27, 2019*; 9:00 p.m. | | at California Baptist | W 84–83 | 6–1 | CBU Events Center (1,760); Riverside, CA |
| November 30, 2019*; 1:00 p.m. | | at Northern Arizona | L 72–76 | 6–2 | Rolle Activity Center (353); Flagstaff, AZ |
| December 2, 2019*; 9:30 p.m. | | at No. 22 Washington | L 55–75 | 6–3 | Alaska Airlines Arena (7,178); Seattle, WA |
| December 6, 2019*; 7:00 p.m. | | Mount Marty | W 94–79 | 7–3 | Sanford Coyote Sports Center (1,787); Vermillion, SD |
| December 9, 2019*; 7:00 p.m. | | Alabama State | W 73–59 | 8–3 | Sanford Coyote Sports Center (1,601); Vermillion, SD |
| December 14, 2019*; 3:30 p.m. | | Mayville State | W 96–60 | 9–3 | Sanford Coyote Sports Center (1,580); Vermillion, SD |
| December 20, 2019*; 7:00 p.m., MidcoSN/ESPN+ | | vs. Northern Colorado | L 68–87 | 9–4 | Sanford Pentagon (2,129); Sioux Falls, SD |
| December 22, 2019*; 3:30 p.m., MidcoSN | | Kansas City | L 75–78 | 9–5 | Sanford Coyote Sports Center (1,483); Vermillion, SD |
| December 29, 2019; 4:30 p.m. | | at Western Illinois | L 75–82 | 9–6 (0–1) | Western Hall; Macomb, IL |
| January 1, 2020; 2:00 p.m. | | at Purdue Fort Wayne | L 59–70 | 9–7 (0–2) | Memorial Coliseum (739); Fort Wayne, IN |
| January 5, 2020; 3:30 p.m. | | Denver | W 80–78 | 10–7 (1–2) | Sanford Coyote Sports Center (2,014); Vermillion, SD |
| January 11, 2020; 3:30 p.m., MidcoSN/ESPN3 | | Omaha | W 91–81 | 11–7 (2–2) | Sanford Coyote Sports Center (2,617); Vermillion, SD |
| January 15, 2020; 7:00 p.m., MidcoSN2/ESPN+ | | at North Dakota State | L 70–72 | 11–8 (2–3) | Scheels Center (2,213); Fargo, ND |
| January 19, 2020; 3:30 p.m., MidcoSN/ESPN+ | | at South Dakota State | W 99–84 | 12–8 (3–3) | Sanford Coyote Sports Center (5,349); Vermillion, SD |
| January 23, 2020; 7:00 p.m., MidcoSN2/ESPN+ | | Purdue Fort Wayne | W 83–60 | 13–8 (4–3) | Sanford Coyote Sports Center (1,684); Vermillion, SD |
| January 25, 2020; 3:30 p.m., MidcoSN2/ESPN3 | | Oral Roberts | W 91–80 | 14–8 (5–3) | Sanford Coyote Sports Center (1,752); Vermillion, SD |
| January 30, 2020; 8:00 p.m. | | at Denver | W 93–87 | 15–8 (6–3) | Magness Arena (805); Denver, CO |
| February 2, 2020; 12:00 p.m., MidcoSN/ESPN3 | | at Omaha | W 81–80 | 16–8 (7–3) | Baxter Arena (2,173); Omaha, NE |
| February 4, 2020*; 7:00 p.m. | | Peru State | W 106–45 | 17–8 | Sanford Coyote Sports Center (1,610); Vermillion, SD |
| February 8, 2020; 2:00 p.m., MidcoSN/ESPN3 | | at North Dakota | W 82–68 | 18–8 (8–3) | Betty Engelstad Sioux Center (1,670); Grand Forks, ND |
| February 12, 2020; 7:00 p.m., MidcoSN/ESPN+ | | Western Illinois | W 85–72 | 19–8 (9–3) | Sanford Coyote Sports Center (1,823); Vermillion, SD |
| February 15, 2020; 7:00 p.m., ESPN3 | | at Oral Roberts | L 80–94 | 19–9 (9–4) | Mabee Center (3,512); Tulsa, OK |
| February 19, 2020; 7:00 p.m., MidcoSN2/ESPN3 | | North Dakota State | L 74–77 | 19–10 (9–5) | Sanford Coyote Sports Center (2,164); Vermillion, SD |
| February 23, 2020; 2:00 p.m., MidcoSN/ESPN+ | | at South Dakota State | L 80–85 | 19–11 (9–6) | Frost Arena (4,572); Brookings, SD |
| February 29, 2020; 3:30 p.m., MidcoSN | | North Dakota | W 77–67 | 20–11 (10–6) | Sanford Coyote Sports Center (3,929); Vermillion, SD |
Summit League tournament
| March 8, 2020; 8:30 p.m., MidcoSN | (3) | vs. (6) North Dakota; Quarterfinals | L 71–74 | 20–12 | Premier Center (6,414); Sioux Falls, SD |
*Non-conference game. ^{#}Rankings from AP poll. (#) Tournament seedings in parentheses. All times are in Central.
