= Creekview High School =

Creekview High School can refer to:

- Creekview High School (Georgia)
- Creekview High School (Texas)
