= 2019–20 Oral Roberts Golden Eagles men's basketball team =

American college basketball season

2019–20 Oral Roberts Golden Eagles men's basketball
- Conference: Summit League
- Record: 17–14 (9–7 The Summit)
- Head coach: Paul Mills (3rd season)
- Assistant coaches: Solomon Bozeman; Russell Springmann; Sam Patterson
- Home arena: Mabee Center

2019–20 Summit League men's basketball standings
	Conf.				Overall
Team	W		L	PCT	W		L	PCT
North Dakota State †	13	–	3	.813	25	–	8	.758
South Dakota State	13	–	3	.813	22	–	10	.688
South Dakota	10	–	6	.625	20	–	12	.625
Oral Roberts	9	–	7	.563	17	–	14	.548
Omaha	9	–	7	.563	16	–	16	.500
North Dakota	7	–	9	.438	15	–	18	.455
Purdue Fort Wayne	6	–	10	.375	14	–	19	.424
Denver	3	–	13	.188	7	–	24	.226
Western Illinois	2	–	14	.125	5	–	21	.192
† 2020 Summit League Tournament winner

The 2019–20 Oral Roberts Golden Eagles men's basketball team represented Oral Roberts University in the 2019–20 NCAA Division I men's basketball season. The Golden Eagles, led by third-year head coach Paul Mills, played their home games at the Mabee Center in Tulsa, Oklahoma as members of the Summit League. They finished the season 17–14, 9–7 in Summit League play, to finish in a tie for fourth place. They defeated Omaha in the quarterfinals of the Summit League tournament before losing in the semifinals to North Dakota State.

== Previous season ==
The Golden Eagles finished the 2018–19 season 11–21 overall, 7–9 in Summit League play, to finish in a tie for fifth place. In the Summit League tournament, they were defeated by North Dakota State in the quarterfinals.

== Roster ==
2019–20 Oral Roberts Golden Eagles men's basketball team
Players
Coaches

Pos.	#	Name	Height	Weight	Year	Hometown
F	0	Kevin Obanor	6 ft 8 in (2.03 m)	240 lb (109 kg)	RS So	Houston, TX
F/C	1	Elijah Lufile	6 ft 8 in (2.03 m)	275 lb (125 kg)	RS So	Milton, ON
G	2	Deondre Burns	6 ft 3 in (1.91 m)	190 lb (86 kg)	Sr	Yazoo City, MS
G	3	Max Abmas	6 ft 1 in (1.85 m)	160 lb (73 kg)	Fr	Rockwall, TX
G	5	D'Mauria Jones	6 ft 3 in (1.91 m)	210 lb (95 kg)	RS Jr	Los Angeles, CA
G	10	Sam Kearns	6 ft 1 in (1.85 m)	180 lb (82 kg)	Sr	San Antonio, TX
G	11	Carlos Jürgens	6 ft 5 in (1.96 m)	175 lb (79 kg)	So	Tartu, Estonia
G	12	R.J. Fuqua	5 ft 11 in (1.8 m)	160 lb (73 kg)	RS So	Tulsa, OK
G	13	Aidan Saunders	6 ft 4 in (1.93 m)	185 lb (84 kg)	Sr	Lithonia, GA
F	14	DeShang Weaver	6 ft 8 in (2.03 m)	200 lb (91 kg)	So	Houston, TX
G	21	Ty Lazenby	6 ft 5 in (1.96 m)	205 lb (93 kg)	Sr	Glencoe, OK
F	22	Francis Lacis	6 ft 7 in (2.01 m)	200 lb (91 kg)	So	Riga, Latvia
F	23	Emmanuel Nzekwesi	6 ft 8 in (2.03 m)	240 lb (109 kg)	RS Sr	Trophy Club, TX

Head coach

- Paul Mills (Texas A&M)

Assistant coach(es)

- Solomon Bozeman (Little Rock)
- Russell Springmann (Salisbury)
- Sam Patterson (Baylor)

Legend

- (C) Team captain
- (S) Suspended
- (I) Ineligible
- (W) Walk-on
- Injured
- Current redshirt

Roster
Last update: September 8, 2024

== Schedule and results ==
Date time, TV	Rank^{#}	Opponent^{#}	Result	Record	Site (attendance) city, state
Exhibition
October 27, 2019*; 4:30 p.m.		vs. Central Arkansas; Hoops for Disaster Relief	L 84–92		Stubblefield Center; Fort Smith, AR
Non-conference regular season
November 6, 2019*; 7:00 p.m., ESPN+		at Oklahoma State	L 75–80	0–1	Gallagher-Iba Arena (7,319); Stillwater, OK
November 8, 2019*; 7:30 p.m.		Houston Baptist	W 95–81	1–1	Mabee Center (2,159); Tulsa, OK
November 12, 2019*; 7:00 p.m.		at Tulsa; PSO Mayor's Cup	L 67–74	1–2	Reynolds Center (3,705); Tulsa, OK
November 15, 2019*; 7:00 p.m., BTN+		at Iowa	L 74–87	1–3	Carver–Hawkeye Arena (11,021); Iowa City, IA
November 19, 2019*; 7:00 p.m.		Rogers State	W 73–60	2–3	Mabee Center (1,944); Tulsa, OK
November 23, 2019*; 2:00 p.m.		at Wichita State	L 59–68	2–4	Charles Koch Arena (10,075); Wichita, KS
November 25, 2019*; 7:00 p.m.		Southwestern Christian	W 99–45	3–4	Mabee Center (1,840); Tulsa, OK
December 3, 2019*; 7:30 p.m., FS1		at Creighton	L 60–72	3–5	CHI Health Center Omaha (16,427); Omaha, NE
December 8, 2019*; 2:00 p.m.		Haskell	W 95–55	4–5	Mabee Center (1,470); Tulsa, OK
December 14, 2019*; 7:00 p.m.		Central Oklahoma	W 69–57	5–5	Mabee Center (1,886); Tulsa, OK
December 17, 2019*; 7:00 p.m.		at Chicago State; Summit League/WAC Challenge	W 97–59	6–5	Jones Convocation Center (407); Chicago, IL
December 21, 2019*; 1:00 p.m.		Missouri State	W 82–72	7–5	Mabee Center (2,490); Tulsa, OK
December 28, 2019*; 8:00 p.m., BYUtv		at BYU	L 73–79	7–6	Marriott Center (12,365); Provo, UT
Summit League regular season
January 2, 2020; 8:15 p.m., MidcoSN2		at South Dakota State	L 79–96	7–7 (0–1)	Frost Arena (1,798); Brookings, SD
January 4, 2020; 7:00 p.m.		at Omaha	L 67–74	7–8 (0–2)	Baxter Arena (2,251); Omaha, NE
January 9, 2020; 8:00 p.m., KGEB/ESPN+		North Dakota State	W 79–73	8–8 (1–2)	Mabee Center (2,886); Tulsa, OK
January 11, 2020; 7:00 p.m., KGEB/ESPN+		North Dakota	W 88–73	9–8 (2–2)	Mabee Center (1,840); Tulsa, OK
January 16, 2020; 7:00 p.m., ESPN3		at Western Illinois	W 87–70	10–8 (3–2)	Western Hall (746); Macomb, IL
January 18, 2020; 12:00 p.m.		at Purdue Fort Wayne	W 92–68	11–8 (4–2)	Memorial Coliseum (1,426); Fort Wayne, IN
January 25, 2020; 3:30 p.m., MidcoSN2		at South Dakota	L 80–91	11–9 (4–3)	Sanford Coyote Sports Center (1,752); Vermillion, SD
January 29, 2020; 7:00 p.m., KGEB		South Dakota State	L 61–76	11–10 (4–4)	Mabee Center (1,924); Tulsa, OK
February 1, 2020; 7:00 p.m.		Denver	W 86–77	12–10 (5–4)	Mabee Center (2,163); Tulsa, OK
February 6, 2020; 7:00 p.m., MidcoSN		at North Dakota	L 68–74	12–11 (5–5)	Betty Engelstad Sioux Center (1,372); Grand Forks, ND
February 8, 2020; 1:00 p.m., MidcoSN2		at North Dakota State	L 76–83	12–12 (5–6)	Scheels Center (3,715); Fargo, ND
February 12, 2020; 7:00 p.m., KGEB/ESPN+		Omaha	W 81–78 ^{OT}	13–12 (6–6)	Mabee Center (1,869); Tulsa, OK
February 15, 2020; 7:00 p.m., KGEB/ESPN+		South Dakota	W 94–80	14–12 (7–6)	Mabee Center (3,512); Tulsa, OK
February 20, 2020; 8:00 p.m., Altitude		at Denver	L 96–100 ^{OT}	14–13 (7–7)	Magness Arena (875); Denver, CO
February 27, 2020; 7:30 p.m.		Western Illinois	W 113–70	15–13 (8–7)	Mabee Center (3,463); Tulsa, OK
February 29, 2020; 7:00 p.m., KGEB/ESPN+		Purdue Fort Wayne	W 72–66	16–13 (9–7)	Mabee Center (4,123); Tulsa, OK
Summit League tournament
March 8, 2020; 6:00 p.m., MidcoSN	(4)	vs. (5) Omaha; Quarterfinals	W 79–52	17–13	Premier Center (6,414); Sioux Falls, SD
March 9, 2020; 6:00 p.m., MidcoSN	(4)	vs. (1) North Dakota State; Semifinals	L 69–75	17–14	Premier Center (4,761); Sioux Falls, SD
*Non-conference game. ^{#}Rankings from AP poll. (#) Tournament seedings in parentheses. All times are in Central.
