= Stanley Umude =

American basketball player (born 1999)

- Umude with FC Barcelona in 2026

No. 3 – FC Barcelona
- Position: Shooting guard / Small forward
- League: Liga ACB; EuroLeague

Personal information
- Born: April 12, 1999 (age 27) Portland, Oregon, U.S.
- Listed height: 2.00 m (6 ft 7 in)
- Listed weight: 210 lb (95 kg)

Career information
- High school: Earl Warren (San Antonio, Texas)
- College: South Dakota (2017–2021); Arkansas (2021–2022)
- NBA draft: 2022: undrafted
- Playing career: 2022–present

Career history
- 2022–2023: Motor City Cruise
- 2022–2023: Detroit Pistons
- 2023–2024: →Motor City Cruise
- 2024–2025: Milwaukee Bucks
- 2024–2025: →Wisconsin Herd
- 2025–2026: Austin Spurs
- 2025–2026: San Antonio Spurs
- 2026: →Austin Spurs
- 2026–present: FC Barcelona

Career highlights
- NBA Cup champion (2024); 2× First-team All-Summit League (2019, 2021); Second-team All-Summit League (2020)
- Stats at NBA.com
- Stats at Basketball Reference

Stanley Umude (/uːˈmuːdeɪ/ oo-MOO-day; born April 12, 1999) is a Nigerian-American professional basketball player for FC Barcelona of the Liga ACB and the EuroLeague. He played college basketball for the Arkansas Razorbacks and the South Dakota Coyotes.

== High school career ==
Umude attended Earl Warren High School in San Antonio, Texas. As a sophomore, he earned All-District honors. Umude was averaging 24 points per game as a junior before an injury forced him to miss the majority of the season. As a senior, he averaged 23.2 points, 6.2 rebounds, 2.4 blocks and 2.1 assists per game. Umude earned All-District honors. He played AAU basketball for Next Level Raiders. Regarded as the No. 58 prospect in his class according to Rivals, Umude committed to South Dakota in November 2016 over offers from Abilene Christian, Incarnate Word and New Hampshire.

== College career ==
Umude came off the bench as a freshman and averaged 1.1 points per game. He saw more minutes as a sophomore due to a rash of injuries on the team. Umude scored 28 points on December 18, 2018, in an 89–53 loss to top-ranked Kansas. On January 30, 2019, he scored a career-high 32 points in a 102–71 loss at Purdue Fort Wayne. As a sophomore, Umude averaged 14.4 points and 5.5 rebounds per game. This represented the largest increase in scoring in a single year in Division I, and he earned First-team All-Summit League honors. Following the season, Umude opted to enter the transfer portal, but on May 8, 2019, he announced he was returning to South Dakota. Coming into his junior season, Umude was named preseason Summit League Player of the Year. He finished second on the team to Tyler Hagedorn in scoring at 16.7 points per game while averaging 6.3 rebounds per game and blocking 42 shots. Umude was named to the All-Summit League Second Team.

In his senior season debut on November 25, 2020, Umude recorded 24 points, six rebounds and three blocks in an 84–61 loss to Colorado, becoming the 31st player since 1988 to score 1,000 career points and the 50th player in school history. On December 12, he scored a career-high 41 points, and grabbed 11 rebounds in a 91–78 win against South Dakota State. As a senior, Umude averaged 21.5 points, seven rebounds and three assists per game, earning First Team All-Summit League honors. After the season, he transferred to Arkansas.

== Professional career ==
=== Motor City Cruise / Detroit Pistons (2022–2024) ===
After going undrafted in the 2022 NBA draft, Umude signed an Exhibit 10 contract with the Detroit Pistons and was added to their training camp roster, but was waived on October 15. On November 3, he was named to the opening night roster for the Motor City Cruise.

On January 12, 2023, Umude tied the Cruise record for most 3-pointers made in a single game (held by Deividas Sirvydis) by making 7 of his 12 attempts along with 26 total points and 5 rebounds as the Cruise fell to the Raptors 905 99 - 105.

On February 10, 2023, Umude signed a 10-day contract with Detroit. Ten days later, he was reacquired by the Cruise.

In July 2023, Umude joined the Pistons for the 2023 NBA Summer League and on October 2, he signed with them. On October 23, his deal was converted into a two-way contract and on February 23, 2024, he signed a standard contract.

On January 9, 2024, Umude would tie the record again for most 3-pointers made in a game by a Cruise player by making 7 of 10 attempts and totaling 28 points and 3 rebounds. This time, the Cruise would win the game when Umude made 7 3-pointers, as the Cruise defeated the Osceola Magic 130 - 113.

=== Milwaukee Bucks / Wisconsin Herd (2024–2025) ===
On July 9, 2024, Umude signed a two-way contract with the Milwaukee Bucks. He made 22 appearances for Milwaukee during the 2024–25 NBA season, averaging 0.7 points, 0.8 rebounds, and 0.2 assists.

=== San Antonio / Austin Spurs (2025–2026) ===
On September 2, 2025, Umude signed an Exhibit 10 contract with the San Antonio Spurs. He was waived by the Spurs prior to the start of the regular season on October 18. For the 2025–26 season, he was added to the roster of the Spurs' G League affiliate, the Austin Spurs. On December 22, San Antonio signed Umude to a two-way contract. He made two appearances for the Spurs, averaging 1.0 point, 0.5 assists, and 0.5 steals. On February 23, 2026, Umude was waived by San Antonio.

=== FC Barcelona (2026–present) ===
On July 21, 2026, Umude signed with FC Barcelona of the Spanish Liga ACB and the EuroLeague.

== Career statistics ==
Legend
GP	Games played	GS	Games started	MPG	Minutes per game
FG%	Field goal percentage	3P%	3-point field goal percentage	FT%	Free throw percentage
RPG	Rebounds per game	APG	Assists per game	SPG	Steals per game
BPG	Blocks per game	PPG	Points per game	**Bold**	Career high

=== NBA ===
Year	Team	GP	GS	MPG	FG%	3P%	FT%	RPG	APG	SPG	BPG	PPG
2022–23	Detroit	1	0	2.1	.000	.000	**1.000**	.0	.0	**1.0**	**1.0**	2.0
2023–24	Detroit	**24**	**2**	**12.8**	.440	**.453**	.906	**2.1**	**.5**	.3	.3	**5.3**
2024–25	Milwaukee	22	0	3.9	.192	.200	.500	.8	.2	.1	.3	.7
2025–26	San Antonio	2	0	3.5	**.500**	.000	—	.0	**.5**	.5	.0	1.0
Career		49	2	8.2	.381	.386	.868	1.4	.3	.3	.3	3.0

=== College ===
Year	Team	GP	GS	MPG	FG%	3P%	FT%	RPG	APG	SPG	BPG	PPG
2017–18	South Dakota	14	0	3.4	.286	.000	.700	.5	.1	.1	.1	1.1
2018–19	South Dakota	30	18	26.6	**.491**	.351	.701	5.5	1.4	**.7**	1.2	14.4
2019–20	South Dakota	32	**32**	30.5	.459	.333	.745	6.3	2.1	.7	**1.3**	16.7
2020–21	South Dakota	25	25	**32.3**	.471	.355	**.799**	**7.0**	**3.0**	.4	.4	**21.5**
2021–22	Arkansas	**37**	25	27.8	.460	**.371**	.724	4.6	1.1	**1.0**	.8	11.9
Career		138	100	26.5	.468	.352	.744	5.2	1.6	.7	.9	14.2

== Personal life ==
Umude's brother Sidney played basketball at both Youngstown State and Southern. Umude is a fan of the Oklahoma City Thunder.
