= 2019–20 Purdue Fort Wayne Mastodons men's basketball team =

American college basketball season

2019–20 Purdue Fort Wayne Mastodons men's basketball
- Conference: Summit League
- Record: 14–19 (6–10 The Summit)
- Head coach: Jon Coffman (6th season)
- Assistant coaches: Ryan Sims (10th season); Paul Corsaro (2nd season); Adam Blaylock (2nd season)
- Home arena: Gates Sports Center; Allen County War Memorial Coliseum

2019–20 Summit League men's basketball standings
	Conf.				Overall
Team	W		L	PCT	W		L	PCT
North Dakota State †	13	–	3	.813	25	–	8	.758
South Dakota State	13	–	3	.813	22	–	10	.688
South Dakota	10	–	6	.625	20	–	12	.625
Oral Roberts	9	–	7	.563	17	–	14	.548
Omaha	9	–	7	.563	16	–	16	.500
North Dakota	7	–	9	.438	15	–	18	.455
Purdue Fort Wayne	6	–	10	.375	14	–	19	.424
Denver	3	–	13	.188	7	–	24	.226
Western Illinois	2	–	14	.125	5	–	21	.192
† 2020 Summit League Tournament winner

The 2019–20 Purdue Fort Wayne Mastodons men's basketball team represented Purdue University Fort Wayne in the 2019–20 NCAA Division I men's basketball season. The Mastodons, led by sixth-year head coach Jon Coffman, split their home games between the Gates Sports Center and the Allen County War Memorial Coliseum, both in Fort Wayne, Indiana, as members of the Summit League. They finished the season 14–19, 6–10 in Summit League play to finish in seventh place. They defeated South Dakota State in the quarterfinals of the Summit League tournament before losing in the semifinals to North Dakota.

This was the Mastodons' final season in the Summit League; the school joined the Horizon League on July 1, 2020.

== Previous season ==
The Mastodons finished the 2018–19 season 18–15 overall, 9–7 in Summit League play, to finish in a tie for 3rd place. In the Summit League tournament, they defeated South Dakota in the quarterfinals, before falling to Omaha in the semifinals.

== Roster ==
2019–20 Purdue Fort Wayne Mastodons men's basketball team
Players
Coaches

Pos.	#	Name	Height	Weight	Year	Hometown
G	0	Chase Johnston	6 ft 2 in (1.88 m)	180 lb (82 kg)	Fr	Boca Raton, Florida
G	1	Jarred Godfrey	6 ft 5 in (1.96 m)	185 lb (84 kg)	So	Atlanta, Georgia
G	2	Brian Patrick	6 ft 5 in (1.96 m)	200 lb (91 kg)	Jr	Fort Lauderdale, Florida
F	3	Ra Kpedi	6 ft 9 in (2.06 m)	225 lb (102 kg)	Jr	Indianapolis, Indiana
G	4	Jalin Wimberly	6 ft 4 in (1.93 m)	180 lb (82 kg)	Jr	Leesburg, Georgia
G	5	Tionne Rollins	6 ft 2 in (1.88 m)	180 lb (82 kg)	Fr	Tallahassee, Florida
G	10	Matt Havey	6 ft 1 in (1.85 m)	185 lb (84 kg)	RS Fr	Lansing, Michigan
F	11	Dylan Carl	6 ft 11 in (2.11 m)	240 lb (109 kg)	RS Jr	Alma, Michigan
F	13	Matt Holba	6 ft 7 in (2.01 m)	225 lb (102 kg)	RS Sr	Noblesville, Indiana
G	15	Deonte Billups	6 ft 4 in (1.93 m)	185 lb (84 kg)	Fr	Moline, Illinois
G	24	DeMierre Black	6 ft 0 in (1.83 m)	185 lb (84 kg)	Jr	Marietta, Georgia
F	31	Josh Inkumsah	6 ft 7 in (2.01 m)	265 lb (120 kg)	RS Fr	Barrie, Ontario
F	34	Cameron Benford	6 ft 8 in (2.03 m)	240 lb (109 kg)	Jr	Seattle, Washington
F	35	Rylen Grundy	6 ft 5 in (1.96 m)	200 lb (91 kg)	So	South Bend, Indiana
G	41	Marcus DeBerry	6 ft 5 in (1.96 m)	195 lb (88 kg)	RS Sr	Union City, Tennessee

Head coach

- Jon Coffman (Washington & Lee)

Assistant coach(es)

- Ryan Sims (Indianapolis)
- Paul Corsaro (Indianapolis)
- Adam Blaylock (Peru State)

Legend

- (C) Team captain
- (S) Suspended
- (I) Ineligible
- (W) Walk-on
- Injured
- Current redshirt

Roster
Last update: December 14, 2019

== Schedule and results ==
Date time, TV	Rank^{#}	Opponent^{#}	Result	Record	Site (attendance) city, state
Non-conference regular season
November 5, 2019*; 10:00 pm		at UNLV	L 71–86	0–1	Thomas & Mack Center (7,728); Paradise, NV
November 7, 2019*; 7:00 pm, CN81		Manchester	W 91–80	1–1	Memorial Coliseum (723); Fort Wayne, IN
November 10, 2019*; 5:00 pm, ESPN+		at Southeast Missouri State	L 78–79	1–2	Show Me Center (685); Cape Girardeau, MO
November 13, 2019*; 7:00 pm, CN81		Miami (OH)	L 80–84	1–3	Memorial Coliseum (1,355); Fort Wayne, IN
November 16, 2019*; 7:00 pm, CN81		Stetson	W 79–55	2–3	Memorial Coliseum (1,269); Fort Wayne, IN
November 19, 2019*; 7:00 pm, ESPN+		at Kent State	L 68–75	2–4	MAC Center (2,125); Kent, OH
November 22, 2019*; 7:00 pm, BTN+		at No. 10 Ohio State	L 46–85	2–5	Value City Arena (11,609); Columbus, OH
November 24, 2019*; 3:00 pm, CN81		Ohio Northern	W 81–47	3–5	Gates Sports Center (881); Fort Wayne, IN
November 27, 2019*; 7:00 pm, CN81		Niagara	W 77–54	4–5	Memorial Coliseum (1,055); Fort Wayne, IN
November 30, 2019*; 8:00 pm		at Grand Canyon	W 71–60	5–5	GCU Arena (6,894); Phoenix, AZ
December 4, 2019*; 7:00 pm, CN81		Eastern Illinois	W 74–69	6–5	Memorial Coliseum (1,059); Fort Wayne, IN
December 7, 2019*; 4:12 pm, ESPN3		at UIC	L 49–62	6–6	Credit Union 1 Arena (1,594); Chicago, IL
December 10, 2019*; 7:00 pm, CN81		Judson	W 69–33	7–6	Memorial Coliseum (1,434); Fort Wayne, IN
December 14, 2019*; 12:00 pm		at IUPUI	W 74–65	7–7	Indiana Farmers Coliseum (1,098); Indianapolis, IN
December 22, 2019*; 1:00 pm		at Iowa State	W 89–59	7–8	Hilton Coliseum (13,541); Ames, IA
Summit League regular season
January 1, 2020; 3:00 pm, CN81		South Dakota	W 70–59	8–8 (1–0)	Gates Sports Center (739); Fort Wayne, IN
January 5, 2020; 5:30 pm, ESPN3		at North Dakota	L 69–83	8–9 (1–1)	Betty Engelstad Sioux Center (1,280); Grand Forks, ND
January 8, 2020; 8:00 pm		at Western Illinois	W 77–69	9–9 (2–1)	Western Hall (498); Macomb, IL
January 11, 2020; 7:00 pm, CN81		South Dakota State	L 61–70	9–10 (2–2)	Memorial Coliseum (1,314); Fort Wayne, IN
January 18, 2020; 1:00 pm, CN81		Oral Roberts	L 68–92	9–11 (2–3)	Memorial Coliseum (1,426); Fort Wayne, IN
January 23, 2020; 8:00 pm, ESPN+		at South Dakota	L 60–83	9–12 (2–4)	Sanford Coyote Sports Center (1,684); Vermillion, SD
January 25, 2020; 8:00 pm		at Omaha	L 71–75	9–13 (2–5)	Baxter Arena (2,704); Omaha, NE
January 30, 2020; 7:30 pm, CN81		North Dakota	W 72–68	10–13 (3–5)	Memorial Coliseum (1,379); Fort Wayne, IN
February 1, 2020; 7:00 pm, CN81		North Dakota State	L 60–71	10–14 (3–6)	Gates Sports Center (1,286); Fort Wayne, IN
February 5, 2020; 7:00 pm, CN81		Western Illinois	W 75–69	11–14 (4–6)	Memorial Coliseum (1,108); Fort Wayne, IN
February 8, 2020; 5:30 pm		at Denver	W 70–63	12–14 (5–6)	Magness Arena (1,080); Denver, CO
February 14, 2020; 8:00 pm, ESPN+		at North Dakota State	L 70–80	12–15 (5–7)	Scheels Center (2,596); Fargo, ND
February 16, 2020; 3:00 pm, ESPN+		at South Dakota State	L 64–75	12–16 (5–8)	Frost Arena (2,409); Brookings, SD
February 20, 2020; 7:00 pm, CN81		Omaha	L 59–61	12–17 (5–9)	Gates Sports Center (846); Fort Wayne, IN
February 26, 2020; 7:00 pm		Denver	W 58–51	13–17 (6–9)	Gates Sports Center (756); Fort Wayne, IN
February 29, 2020; 8:00 pm, ESPN3		at Oral Roberts	L 66–72	13–18 (6–10)	Mabee Center (4,123); Tulsa, OK
Summit League tournament
March 7, 2020; 9:30 pm, MidcoSN	(7)	vs. (2) South Dakota State; Quarterfinals	W 77–74	14–18	Premier Center (8,614); Sioux Falls, SD
March 9, 2020; 8:30 pm, MidcoSN	(7)	vs. (6) North Dakota; Semifinals	L 56–73	14–19	Premier Center (4,761); Sioux Falls, SD
*Non-conference game. ^{#}Rankings from AP Poll. (#) Tournament seedings in parentheses. All times are in Eastern.
