= Ryan Russell (American football) =

American football player (born 1992)

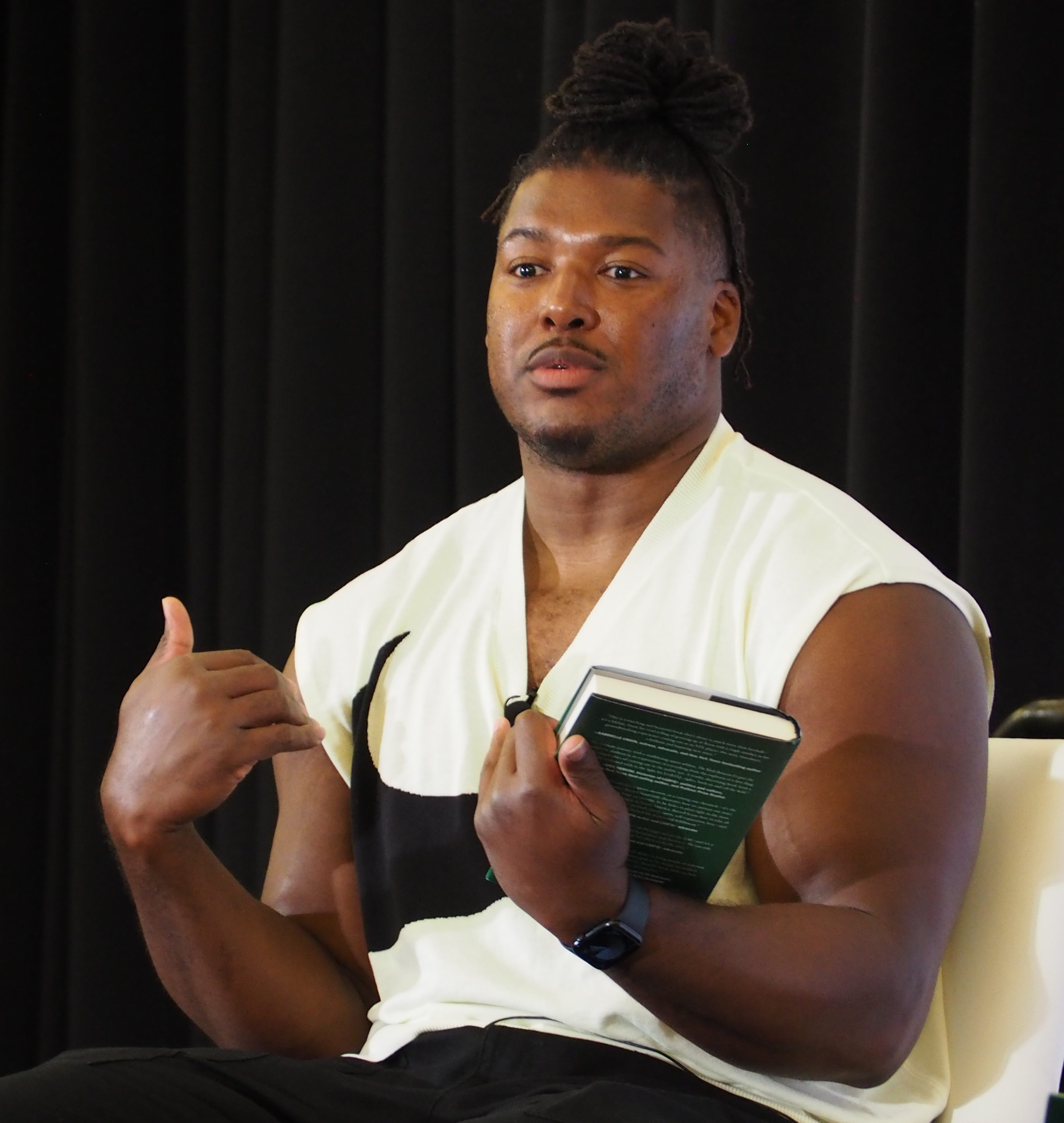
- Russell in 2023

No. 99, 96, 95
- Position: Defensive end

Personal information
- Born: January 17, 1992 (age 34); Carrollton, Texas, U.S.
- Listed height: 6 ft 5 in (1.96 m)
- Listed weight: 275 lb (125 kg)

Career information
- High school: Creekview (Carrollton)
- College: Purdue
- NFL draft: 2015: 5th round, 163rd overall pick

Career history
- Dallas Cowboys (2015); Tampa Bay Buccaneers (2016–2017); Buffalo Bills (2018)*
- * Offseason or practice squad member only

Career NFL statistics
- Games played: 23
- Total tackles: 21
- Sacks: 3
- Stats at Pro Football Reference

Ryan K. Russell (born January 17, 1992) is an American former professional football player who was a defensive end in the National Football League (NFL) for the Dallas Cowboys and Tampa Bay Buccaneers. He played college football at Purdue University.

== Early life ==
Russell attended Creekview High School. As a senior defensive lineman, he registered 62 tackles (17 for loss) and 5 sacks, while being named second-team All-district.

He accepted a football scholarship from Purdue University. His best season came as a freshman, playing as a defensive end in a 4-3 defense, registering 11 starts, 33 tackles (4.5 for loss), one sack, 3 forced fumbles and 3 fumbles recovered. As a sophomore, he tallied 13 starts, 37 tackles and 4 sacks.

As a junior the team switched to a 3–4 defense in mid-October and he was moved to the Jack linebacker position, recording 11 starts, 35 tackles (5.5 for loss) and 2 sacks.

As a senior, he was moved back to defensive end, replacing the graduated Bruce Gaston. He had 44 tackles (6.5 for loss) and 3 sacks, finishing his career as a four-year starter with 149 tackles (25 for loss) and 10 sacks.

== Professional career ==
Pre-draft measurables
Height	Weight	Arm length	Hand span	40-yard dash	10-yard split	20-yard split	20-yard shuttle	Three-cone drill	Vertical jump	Broad jump	Bench press
6 ft 4 1/4 in (1.94 m)	269 lb (122 kg)	33 3/8 in (0.85 m)	10 1/4 in (0.26 m)	4.68 s	1.63 s	2.75 s	4.47 s	7.25 s	32 1/2 in (0.83 m)	9 ft 11 in (3.02 m)	25 reps
All values from NFL Combine

=== Dallas Cowboys ===
Russell was selected by the Dallas Cowboys in the fifth round (163rd overall) of the 2015 NFL draft, after dropping because his physical skills didn't match his on-field production. In training camp he was tried at left defensive end and at the three-technique defensive tackle positions. During the season, he appeared in one game and was declared inactive in 11. After being limited with an abdomen strain, he was placed on the injured reserve list on December 2, in order to activate offensive tackle Chaz Green from the reserve/PUP list.

In the 2016 training camp, he was given the chance to start after the suspensions to defensive ends DeMarcus Lawrence and Randy Gregory. On September 3, he was released after struggling during the preseason games. The next day, he was signed to the Cowboys' practice squad. He was released on September 6.

=== Tampa Bay Buccaneers ===
On September 21, 2016, Russell was signed to the Tampa Bay Buccaneers' practice squad. He was promoted to the active roster on November 12, and had his first career sack against the Seattle Seahawks. He played in 8 games as a reserve defensive end, collecting 4 tackles and one sack.

In 2017, he appeared in 14 games, starting the last 7 contests, while registering 17 tackles. He missed the fifth and sixth games with a dislocated left shoulder, which limited him the rest of the year. His 2 sacks came in each of the final two contests. He wasn't re-signed after the season.

=== Buffalo Bills ===
On July 29, 2018, Russell signed as a free agent with the Buffalo Bills. On September 1, he was released by the Bills to reach the league's 53-man roster limit. It was later reported in the media that he had a shoulder injury, which prevented him from playing again that season.

== Personal life ==
Following the death of close friend and former teammate Joseph Gilliam in 2018, Russell suffered from a severe bout of depression. He moved to Los Angeles and began writing.

In August 2019, he came out publicly as bisexual in an essay for ESPN. He did so to live honestly and without fear of being outed; he also cited the fear of not being able to support his mother and grandfather if he lost his career. At the same time he introduced his boyfriend Corey O'Brien, a dancer; they opened Corey & Russ, a YouTube channel; as of June 2020, they have over 15,600 subscribers. Sarah McBride, national Press Secretary for Human Rights Campaign, praised Russell for "creating more space and opportunity for young LGBTQ people to dream big and to pursue their goals". In April 2021, he penned an article in The Guardian against the anti-trans laws being proposed in multiple American states, stating that "sport is one of the strongest conduits to help show society what it is capable of when we come together, but it has to be used for the better of all of us". He penned another The Guardian article in July 2022 stating how NFL players that come out typically find themselves unemployed not long after. In 2023, Russell, under the name R.K. Russell, published a memoir, The Yards Between Us: A Memoir of Life, Love and Football. The book has been optioned for a television series by Sony Pictures TV.

== See also ==
- Homosexuality in American football
