= 2019–20 Western Illinois Leathernecks men's basketball team =

American college basketball season

2019–20 Western Illinois Leathernecks men's basketball
- Conference: Summit League
- Record: 5–21 (2–14 The Summit)
- Head coach: Billy Wright (6th season)
- Assistant coaches: Jestin Anderson; Joshua Jones; Chad Pecka
- Home arena: Western Hall

2019–20 Summit League men's basketball standings
	Conf.				Overall
Team	W		L	PCT	W		L	PCT
North Dakota State †	13	–	3	.813	25	–	8	.758
South Dakota State	13	–	3	.813	22	–	10	.688
South Dakota	10	–	6	.625	20	–	12	.625
Oral Roberts	9	–	7	.563	17	–	14	.548
Omaha	9	–	7	.563	16	–	16	.500
North Dakota	7	–	9	.438	15	–	18	.455
Purdue Fort Wayne	6	–	10	.375	14	–	19	.424
Denver	3	–	13	.188	7	–	24	.226
Western Illinois	2	–	14	.125	5	–	21	.192
† 2020 Summit League Tournament winner

The 2019–20 Western Illinois Leathernecks men's basketball team represented Western Illinois University in the 2019–20 NCAA Division I men's basketball season. The Leathernecks, led by sixth-year head coach Billy Wright, played their home games at Western Hall in Macomb, Illinois, as members of the Summit League. They finished the season 5–21, 2–14 in Summit League play to finish in last place. They failed to qualify for the Summit League tournament.

On March 3, 2020, the school announced that head coach Billy Wright's contract would not be renewed. He finished at Western Illinois with a six-year record of 53–115. On March 30, the school announced former Milwaukee head coach Rob Jeter would be hired as the new head coach.

== Previous season ==
The Leathernecks finished the 2018–19 season 10–21, 4–12 in Summit League play to finish in 8th place. They upset top-seeded South Dakota State in the quarterfinals of the Summit League tournament, before losing to North Dakota State in the semifinals.

== Roster ==
2019–20 Western Illinois Leathernecks men's basketball team
Players
Coaches

Pos.	#	Name	Height	Weight	Year	Hometown
G	1	Zion Young	6 ft 4 in (1.93 m)	190 lb (86 kg)	So	Chicago, Illinois
G	2	Jaeden King	6 ft 6 in (1.98 m)	185 lb (84 kg)	Fr	Minneapolis, Minnesota
G	10	Kobe Webster	6 ft 0 in (1.83 m)	170 lb (77 kg)	Jr	Indianapolis, Indiana
G	11	Keshon Montague	6 ft 0 in (1.83 m)	170 lb (77 kg)	Sr	Brampton, Ontario
G	12	Jack Hallee	6 ft 1 in (1.85 m)	165 lb (75 kg)	Fr	Indian Creek, Illinois
G	14	Anthony Jones	6 ft 5 in (1.96 m)	190 lb (86 kg)	Jr	Indianapolis, Indiana
F	15	Ben Pyle	6 ft 7 in (2.01 m)	185 lb (84 kg)	So	McPherson, Kansas
G	20	Jeremiah Usiosefe	6 ft 5 in (1.96 m)	200 lb (91 kg)	Sr	Hamilton, Ontario
G	22	Dre'Shawn Allen	6 ft 1 in (1.85 m)	170 lb (77 kg)	So	Auburn Hills, Michigan
F	24	James Claar	6 ft 8 in (2.03 m)	215 lb (98 kg)	RS Sr	Bolingbrook, Illinois
F	30	Jake Weyhrich	6 ft 7 in (2.01 m)	210 lb (95 kg)	Jr	Manito, Illinois
F/C	32	Roderick Smith	6 ft 8 in (2.03 m)	240 lb (109 kg)	So	Crystal Springs, Mississippi
C	34	Alex Brantley	7 ft 0 in (2.13 m)	215 lb (98 kg)	Fr	Detroit, Michigan
G	40	C.J. Duff	6 ft 1 in (1.85 m)	190 lb (86 kg)	Sr	Waukegan, Illinois
C	42	Kyle Arrington	6 ft 10 in (2.08 m)	225 lb (102 kg)	Jr	Council Bluffs, Iowa

Head coach

- Billy Wright (Bradley)

Assistant coach(es)

- Jestin Anderson (Quincy)
- Joshua Jones (Eastern Kentucky)
- Chad Pecka (Northwestern Oklahoma State)

Legend

- (C) Team captain
- (S) Suspended
- (I) Ineligible
- (W) Walk-on
- Injured
- Current redshirt

Roster
Last update: December 17, 2019

== Schedule and results ==
Date time, TV	Opponent	Result	Record	Site (attendance) city, state
Non-conference regular season
November 5, 2019*; 6:00 pm	at Indiana	L 65–98	0–1	Simon Skjodt Assembly Hall (17,222); Bloomington, IN
November 9, 2019*; 7:00 pm	Stetson	L 75–77	0–2	Western Hall (340); Macomb, IL
November 13, 2019*; 7:00 pm, ESPN3	UT Martin	L 91–98	0–3	Western Hall (610); Macomb, IL
November 20, 2019*; 7:30 pm	Northern Illinois	L 81–86	0–4	Western Hall (684); Macomb, IL
November 23, 2019*; 7:00 pm	Central Christian	W 113–62	1–4	Western Hall (381); Macomb, IL
November 26, 2019*; 5:00 pm, ESPN3	at Ball State	W 69–62	2–4	Worthen Arena (3,088); Muncie, IN
November 30, 2019*; 7:00 pm	at Kansas City; Summit League/WAC Challenge	L 67–68	2–5	Swinney Recreation Center (1,009); Kansas City, MO
December 4, 2019*; 6:00 pm, ESPN3	at Evansville	L 86–90	2–6	Ford Center (4,509); Evansville, IN
December 16, 2019*; 7:00 pm	Eastern Illinois	L 47–85	2–7	Western Hall (347); Macomb, IL
December 19, 2019*; 7:00 pm	Holy Family	W 91–64	3–7	Western Hall (299); Macomb, IL
Summit League regular season
December 29, 2019; 4:30 pm	South Dakota	W 82–75	4–7 (1–0)	Western Hall; Macomb, IL
January 2, 2020; 8:00 pm, ESPN+	at North Dakota State	L 74–94	4–8 (1–1)	Scheels Center (1,929); Fargo, ND
January 4, 2020; 4:15 pm, ESPN3	at South Dakota State	L 56–91	4–9 (1–2)	Frost Arena (2,407); Brookings, SD
January 8, 2020; 7:00 pm	Purdue Fort Wayne	L 69–77	4–10 (1–3)	Western Hall (498); Macomb, IL
January 11, 2020; 2:00 pm	Denver	W 86–80	5–10 (2–3)	Western Hall (347); Macomb, IL
January 16, 2020; 7:00 pm	Oral Roberts	L 70–87	5–11 (2–4)	Western Hall (746); Macomb, IL
January 23, 2020; 7:00 pm	at Omaha	L 82–87 ^{OT}	5–12 (2–5)	Baxter Arena (1,775); Omaha, NE
January 25, 2020; 7:00 pm	at North Dakota	L 77–83	5–13 (2–6)	Betty Engelstad Sioux Center (1,585); Grand Forks, ND
January 30, 2020; 7:30 pm, ESPN3	North Dakota State	L 49–70	5–14 (2–7)	Western Hall (624); Macomb, IL
February 1, 2020; 7:00 pm, ESPN3	South Dakota State	L 61–71	5–15 (2–8)	Western Hall (772); Macomb, IL
February 5, 2020; 6:00 pm	at Purdue Fort Wayne	L 69–75	5–16 (2–9)	Memorial Coliseum (1,108); Fort Wayne, IN
February 12, 2020; 7:00 pm, ESPN+	at South Dakota	L 72–85	5–17 (2–10)	Sanford Coyote Sports Center (1,823); Vermillion, SD
February 15, 2020; 7:00 pm, ESPN3	North Dakota	L 83–86 ^{OT}	5–18 (2–11)	Western Hall (1,138); Macomb, IL
February 22, 2020; 2:00 pm	Omaha	L 86–93	5–19 (2–12)	Western Hall; Macomb, IL
February 27, 2020; 7:30 pm	at Oral Roberts	L 70–113	5–20 (2–13)	Mabee Center (3,463); Tulsa, OK
February 29, 2020; 2:00 pm	at Denver	L 63–69	5–21 (2–14)	Magness Arena (1,390); Denver, CO
*Non-conference game. ^{#}Rankings from AP Poll. (#) Tournament seedings in parentheses. All times are in Central.
