= 2019–20 South Dakota State Jackrabbits men's basketball team =

American college basketball season

2019–20 South Dakota State Jackrabbits men's basketball

Summit League regular season co-champions
- Conference: Summit League
- Record: 22–10 (13–3 The Summit)
- Head coach: Eric Henderson (1st season)
- Assistant coaches: Rob Klinkefus; Bryan Petersen; Tramel Barnes
- Home arena: Frost Arena

2019–20 Summit League men's basketball standings
	Conf.				Overall
Team	W		L	PCT	W		L	PCT
North Dakota State †	13	–	3	.813	25	–	8	.758
South Dakota State	13	–	3	.813	22	–	10	.688
South Dakota	10	–	6	.625	20	–	12	.625
Oral Roberts	9	–	7	.563	17	–	14	.548
Omaha	9	–	7	.563	16	–	16	.500
North Dakota	7	–	9	.438	15	–	18	.455
Purdue Fort Wayne	6	–	10	.375	14	–	19	.424
Denver	3	–	13	.188	7	–	24	.226
Western Illinois	2	–	14	.125	5	–	21	.192
† 2020 Summit League Tournament winner

The 2019–20 South Dakota State Jackrabbits men's basketball team represented South Dakota State University during the 2019–20 NCAA Division I men's basketball season. The Jackrabbits, led by first-year head coach Eric Henderson, played their home games at Frost Arena in Brookings, South Dakota as members of the Summit League. They finished the season 22–10, 13–3 in Summit League play to finish in a tie for the Summit League regular season championship. They lost in the quarterfinals of the Summit League tournament to Purdue Fort Wayne.

== Previous season ==
The Jackrabbits finished the season 24–9, 14–2 in Summit League play to win the Summit League regular season championship. In the Summit League tournament, they lost to Western Illinois in the first round of the tournament. The Jackrabbits received an automatic bid to the NIT where they lost in the first round to Texas.

== Roster ==
2019–20 South Dakota State Jackrabbits men's basketball team
Players
Coaches

Pos.	#	Name	Height	Weight	Year	Hometown
G	0	Brandon Key	5 ft 10 in (1.78 m)	180 lb (82 kg)	Sr	Milwaukee, Wisconsin
G	1	Matthew Mims	6 ft 0 in (1.83 m)	180 lb (82 kg)	Fr	Cedar Rapids, Iowa
G	2	Tray Buchanan	6 ft 2 in (1.88 m)	180 lb (82 kg)	Jr	East Moline, Illinois
G	3	Baylor Scheierman	6 ft 6 in (1.98 m)	180 lb (82 kg)	Fr	Aurora, Nebraska
F	10	Alou Dillon	6 ft 8 in (2.03 m)	230 lb (104 kg)	So	Wauwatosa, Wisconsin
G	11	Noah Friedel	6 ft 4 in (1.93 m)	185 lb (84 kg)	Fr	Tea, South Dakota
G	15	Beau Brown	6 ft 1 in (1.85 m)	175 lb (79 kg)	Sr	Mitchell, South Dakota
F	22	Aaron Fiegen	6 ft 7 in (2.01 m)	215 lb (98 kg)	Fr	Madison, South Dakota
G	23	Owen King	6 ft 3 in (1.91 m)	200 lb (91 kg)	Fr	Caledonia, Minnesota
F	32	Matt Dentlinger	6 ft 8 in (2.03 m)	240 lb (109 kg)	So	Carroll, Iowa
G	34	Alex Arians	6 ft 4 in (1.93 m)	210 lb (95 kg)	So	Madison, Wisconsin
F	35	Douglas Wilson	6 ft 7 in (2.01 m)	210 lb (95 kg)	Jr	Des Moines, Iowa
G/F	50	David Wingett	6 ft 4 in (1.93 m)	205 lb (93 kg)	Fr	Winnebago, Nebraska

Head coach

- Eric Henderson (Wayne State (NE))

Assistant coach(es)

- Rob Klinkefus (Buena Vista)
- Brian Petersen (Iowa State)
- Tramel Barnes (Southwest Minnesota State)

Legend

- (C) Team captain
- (S) Suspended
- (I) Ineligible
- (W) Walk-on
- Injured
- Current redshirt

Roster
Last update: Aug 25, 2019

== Schedule and results ==
Date time, TV	Rank^{#}	Opponent^{#}	Result	Record	Site (attendance) city, state
Exhibition
Oct 30, 2019*; 8:15 pm		Mount Marty	W 98–70	–	Frost Arena; Brookings, SD
Non-conference regular season
Nov 5, 2019*; 7:00 pm, MidcoSN/ESPN+		Texas–Rio Grande Valley	W 70–57	1–0	Frost Arena (1,704); Brookings, SD
Nov 7, 2019*; 7:00 pm		Peru State	W 86–58	2–0	Frost Arena (1,554); Brookings, SD
Nov 9, 2019*; 9:00 pm, ESPN3		at Cal State Bakersfield	W 93–91 ^{2OT}	3–0	Icardo Center (1,918); Bakersfield, CA
Nov 12, 2019*; 9:00 pm, P12N		at USC	L 66–84	3–1	Galen Center (2,210); Los Angeles, CA
Nov 15, 2019*; 8:00 pm, BTN		at Nebraska	L 73–90	3–2	Pinnacle Bank Arena (15,946); Lincoln, NE
Nov 18, 2019*; 7:00 pm		North Alabama	W 78–73	4–2	Frost Arena (1,616); Brookings, SD
Nov 21, 2019*; 8:00 pm		at No. 14 Arizona	L 64–71	4–3	McKale Memorial Center (12,828); Tucson, AZ
Nov 24, 2019*; 2:00 pm		Mississippi Valley State	W 84–54	5–3	Frost Arena (1,569); Brookings, SD
Nov 27, 2019*; 7:00 pm, MidcoSN/ESPN3		Samford	W 86–77	6–3	Frost Arena (1,307); Brookings, SD
Nov 30, 2019*; 3:00 pm		at Indiana	L 50–64	6–4	Simon Skjodt Assembly Hall (12,562); Bloomington, IN
Dec 5, 2019*; 9:00 pm		at Montana State	L 70–77	6–5	Brick Breeden Fieldhouse (4,877); Bozeman, MT
Dec 10, 2019*; 8:00 pm		at Colorado State	L 68–72	6–6	Moby Arena; Fort Collins, CO
Dec 13, 2019*; 7:00 pm		Nebraska–Kearney	W 66–53	7–6	Frost Arena (1,514); Brookings, SD
Dec 18, 2019*; 7:00 pm, MidcoSN/ESPN+		Florida Gulf Coast	W 75–56	8–6	Frost Arena (1,495); Brookings, SD
Dec 21, 2019*; 7:00 pm		Idaho	W 85–57	9–6	Frost Arena (1,507); Brookings, SD
Summit League regular season
Dec 29, 2019; 4:30 pm, MidcoSN/ESPN+		at Omaha	L 78–81	9–7 (0–1)	Baxter Arena (4,234); Omaha, NE
Jan 2, 2020; 8:15 pm, MidcoSN2/ESPN+		Oral Roberts	W 96–79	10–7 (1–1)	Frost Arena (1,798); Brookings, SD
Jan 4, 2020; 4:15 pm, MidcoSN/ESPN3		Western Illinois	W 91–56	11–7 (2–1)	Frost Arena (2,407); Brookings, SD
Jan 8, 2020; 8:00 pm		at Denver	W 80–68	12–7 (3–1)	Magness Arena (774); Denver, CO
Jan 11, 2020; 6:00 pm		Purdue Fort Wayne	W 70–61	13–7 (4–1)	Gates Sports Center (1,314); Fort Wayne, IN
Jan 15, 2020; 7:00 pm, MidcoSN/ESPN+		North Dakota	W 87–66	14–7 (5–1)	Frost Arena (2,271); Brookings, SD
Jan 19, 2020; 3:30 pm, MidcoSN/ESPN3		at South Dakota	L 84–99	14–8 (5–2)	Sanford Coyote Sports Center (5,349); Vermillion, SD
Jan 22, 2020; 7:00 pm, MidcoSN/ESPN3		North Dakota State	W 78–73	15–8 (6–2)	Frost Arena (3,011); Brookings, SD
Jan 29, 2020; 7:00 pm		at Oral Roberts	W 76–61	16–8 (7–2)	Mabee Center (1,924); Tulsa, OK
Feb 1, 2020; 7:00 pm, ESPN3		at Western Illinois	W 71–61	17–8 (8–2)	Western Hall (772); Macomb, IL
Feb 8, 2020; 4:15 pm		Omaha	W 81–64	18–8 (9–2)	Frost Arena (3,845); Brookings, SD
Feb 14, 2020; 7:00 pm		Denver	W 90–78	19–8 (10–2)	Frost Arena (2,242); Brookings, SD
Feb 16, 2020; 2:00 pm, MidcoSN/ESPN+		Purdue Fort Wayne	W 75–64	20–8 (11–2)	Frost Arena (2,409); Brookings, SD
Feb 19, 2020; 7:00 pm, MidcoSN/ESPN+		at North Dakota	W 94–83	21–8 (12–2)	Betty Engelstad Sioux Center (1,702); Grand Forks, ND
Feb 23, 2020; 2:00 pm, MidcoSN/ESPN+		South Dakota	W 85–80	22–8 (13–2)	Frost Arena (4,572); Brookings, SD
Feb 27, 2020; 8:00 pm, MidcoSN/ESPN+		at North Dakota State	L 69–71 ^{OT}	22–9 (13–3)	Scheels Center (4,036); Fargo, ND
Summit League tournament
Mar 7, 2020; 8:30 pm, MidcoSN	(2)	vs. (7) Purdue Fort Wayne; Quarterfinals	L 74–77	22–10	Premier Center (8,614); Sioux Falls, SD
*Non-conference game. ^{#}Rankings from AP Poll. (#) Tournament seedings in parentheses. All times are in Central Time.
