= 2019–20 North Dakota State Bison men's basketball team =

American college basketball season

2019–20 North Dakota State Bison men's basketball

Summit League regular season co-champions Summit League tournament champions
- Conference: Summit League
- Record: 25–8 (13–3 The Summit)
- Head coach: David Richman (6th season)
- Assistant coaches: Jayden Olson; Kyan Brown; Will Veasley
- Home arena: Scheels Center

2019–20 Summit League men's basketball standings
	Conf.				Overall
Team	W		L	PCT	W		L	PCT
North Dakota State †	13	–	3	.813	25	–	8	.758
South Dakota State	13	–	3	.813	22	–	10	.688
South Dakota	10	–	6	.625	20	–	12	.625
Oral Roberts	9	–	7	.563	17	–	14	.548
Omaha	9	–	7	.563	16	–	16	.500
North Dakota	7	–	9	.438	15	–	18	.455
Purdue Fort Wayne	6	–	10	.375	14	–	19	.424
Denver	3	–	13	.188	7	–	24	.226
Western Illinois	2	–	14	.125	5	–	21	.192
† 2020 Summit League Tournament winner

The 2019–20 North Dakota State Bison men's basketball team represented North Dakota State University in the 2019–20 NCAA Division I men's basketball season. The Bison, led by sixth-year head coach David Richman, played their home games at the Scheels Center in Fargo, North Dakota as members of the Summit League. They finished the season 25–8, 13–3 in Summit League play to finish in a tie for the Summit League regular season championship. They defeated Denver, Oral Roberts, and North Dakota to become champions of the 2020 Summit League tournament. They earned the Summit League's automatic bid to the NCAA tournament, however, the tournament was cancelled amid the COVID-19 pandemic.

== Previous season ==
The Bison finished the season 19-16, 9-7 in Summit League play to finish in a tie for third place. They defeated Oral Roberts in the quarterfinals, Western Illinois in the semifinals, and Omaha to win the Summit League tournament, and obtained a 16 seed in the East regional of the 2019 NCAA Division I men's basketball tournament. In the First Four, they defeated North Carolina Central before losing to the number 1 overall seeded Duke.

== Roster ==
2019–20 North Dakota State Bison men's basketball team
Players
Coaches

Pos.	#	Name	Height	Weight	Year	Hometown
G	0	Vinnie Shahid	5 ft 11 in (1.8 m)	190 lb (86 kg)	Sr	Minneapolis, Minnesota
G	2	Jaxon Knotex	6 ft 6 in (1.98 m)	215 lb (98 kg)	So	River Falls, Wisconsin
G	3	Tyree Eady	6 ft 5 in (1.96 m)	215 lb (98 kg)	So	Middleton, Wisconsin
G/F	5	Sam Griesel	6 ft 6 in (1.98 m)	215 lb (98 kg)	So	Lincoln, NE
G	11	Jared Samuelson	6 ft 3 in (1.91 m)	185 lb (84 kg)	Sr	Gretna, Nebraska
G	12	Noah Samuelson	6 ft 9 in (2.06 m)	190 lb (86 kg)	Fr	Breckenridge, Minnesota
G	13	Chris Quayle	6 ft 5 in (1.96 m)	190 lb (86 kg)	Sr	Riverton, Wyoming
G	21	Jarius Cook	6 ft 3 in (1.91 m)	180 lb (82 kg)	So	Brooklyn Park, Minnesota
G	22	Cameron Hunter	6 ft 3 in (1.91 m)	180 lb (82 kg)	Jr	Olathe, Kansas
G	23	Maleeck Harden-Hayes	6 ft 7 in (2.01 m)	175 lb (79 kg)	Fr	Moorhead, Minnesota
G	24	Tyson Ward	6 ft 6 in (1.98 m)	195 lb (88 kg)	Sr	Tampa, Florida
F	32	Odell Wilson IV	6 ft 6 in (1.98 m)	245 lb (111 kg)	RS Fr	Minneapolis, Minnesota
F	34	Rocky Kreuser	6 ft 10 in (2.08 m)	250 lb (113 kg)	Jr	White Bear Lake, Minnesota
F	44	Tyler Witz	6 ft 9 in (2.06 m)	250 lb (113 kg)	Jr	Clearwater, Florida

Head coach

- David Richman (North Dakota State)

Assistant coach(es)

- Jayden Olson (Dickinson State)
- Kyan Brown (Oral Roberts)
- Will Veasley (Butler)

Legend

- (C) Team captain
- (S) Suspended
- (I) Ineligible
- (W) Walk-on
- Injured
- Current redshirt

Roster
Last update: November 3, 2019

== Schedule and results ==
Date time, TV	Rank^{#}	Opponent^{#}	Result	Record	Site (attendance) city, state
Exhibition
Oct 30, 2019*; 7:00 pm		Dickinson State	W 104–63		Scheels Center (2,701); Fargo, ND
Regular season
Nov 5, 2019*; 7:00 pm, ESPN+		at Kansas State	L 54-67	0–1	Bramlage Coliseum (8,145); Manhattan, KS
Nov 7, 2019*; 7:00 pm		Mayville State	W 93–53	1–1	Scheels Center (1,770); Fargo, ND
Nov 11, 2019*; 1:00 pm, MidcoSN/ESPN+		Cal Poly	W 74–67	2–1	Scheels Center (2,006); Fargo, ND
Nov 15, 2019*; 5:00 pm		vs. Texas–Rio Grande Valley; Islander Invitational	W 76–70	3–1	American Bank Center (209); Corpus Christi, TX
Nov 16, 2019*; 6:30 pm		at Texas A&M–Corpus Christi; Islander Invitational	W 57–45	4–1	American Bank Center (1,108); Corpus Christi, TX
Nov 17, 2019*; 1:00 pm		vs. Stony Brook; Islander Invitational	L 57–64	4–2	American Bank Center (468); Corpus Christi, TX
Nov 23, 2019*; 5:00 pm		Utah Valley	L 62–68	4–3	Scheels Center (2,323); Fargo, ND
Nov 26, 2019*; 9:00 pm		at Idaho	W 70–53	5–3	Kibbie Dome (792); Moscow, ID
Dec 3, 2019*; 4:30 pm, ESPN+/ESPN3		at Indiana State	L 60–71	5–4	Hulman Center (3,371); Terre Haute, IN
Dec 7, 2019*; 7:00 pm, MidcoSN/ESPN+		East Tennessee State	W 78–68	6–4	Scheels Center (2,658); Fargo, ND
Dec 11, 2019*; 9:00 pm, Big West TV		at Cal State Northridge	W 71–62	7–4	Matadome (832); Los Angeles, CA
Dec 16, 2019*; 7:00 pm, MidcoSN/ESPN+		Montana State	W 79–65	8–4	Scheels Center (2,523); Fargo, ND
Dec 20, 2019*; 8:00 pm, FS1		at Marquette	W 82–68	8–5	Fiserv Forum (16,359); Milwaukee, WI
Dec 29, 2019; 4:30 pm, ALT2		at Denver	W 66–55	9–5 (1–0)	Magness Arena (1,059); Denver, CO
Jan 2, 2020; 8:00 pm, MidcoSN/ESPN+		Western Illinois	W 94–74	10–5 (2–0)	Scheels Center (1,929); Fargo, ND
Jan 5, 2020*; 2:00 pm		Northland (WI)	W 97–43	11–5	Scheels Center (1,112); Fargo, ND
Jan 9, 2020; 7:00 pm, ESPN+		at Oral Roberts	L 73–79	11–6 (2–1)	Mabee Center (2,886); Tulsa, OK
Jan 15, 2020; 7:00 pm, MidcoSN2/ESPN+		South Dakota	W 72–70	12–6 (3–1)	Scheels Center (2,213); Fargo, ND
Jan 19, 2020 (Note: Game postponed from 1-18-20 @ 2 pm to 1-19-20 @ 1 pm due to weather. https://www.kvrr.com/2020/01/17/ndsu-und-basketball-game-moved-to-sunday-due-to-weather/); 1:00 pm, MidcoSN2/ESPN3		North Dakota	W 83–74	13–6 (4–1)	Scheels Center (3,817); Fargo, ND
Jan 22, 2020; 7:00 pm, MidcoSN/ESPN3		at South Dakota State	L 73–78	13–7 (4–2)	Frost Arena (3,011); Brookings, SD
Jan 25, 2020; 2:00 pm, MidcoSN/ESPN3		Denver	W 82–70	14–7 (5–2)	Scheels Center (3,006); Fargo, ND
Jan 30, 2020; 7:30 pm		at Western Illinois	W 70–49	15–7 (6–2)	Western Hall (624); Macomb, IL
Feb 1, 2020; 6:00 pm		at Purdue Fort Wayne	W 71–60	16–7 (7–2)	Gates Sports Center (1,286); Fort Wayne, IN
Feb 5, 2020; 7:00 pm, MidcoSN/ESPN+		at Omaha	W 86–78	17–7 (8–2)	Baxter Arena (2,355); Omaha, NE
Feb 8, 2020; 1:00 pm, MidcoSN2/ESPN3		Oral Roberts	W 83–76	18–7 (9–2)	Scheels Center (3,715); Fargo, ND
Feb 14, 2020; 7:00 pm, MidcoSN2/ESPN+		Purdue Fort Wayne	W 80–70	19–7 (10–2)	Scheels Center (2,596); Fargo, ND
Feb 19, 2020; 7:00 pm, MidcoSN2/ESPN3		at South Dakota	W 77–74	20–7 (11–2)	Sanford Coyote Sports Center (2,164); Vermillion, SD
Feb 22, 2020; 7:00 pm, MidcoSN2/ESPN3		at North Dakota	L 68–71	20–8 (11–3)	Betty Engelstad Sioux Center (2,686); Grand Forks, ND
Feb 27, 2020; 8:00 pm, MidcoSN/ESPN+		South Dakota State	W 71–69 ^{OT}	21–8 (12–3)	Scheels Center (4,036); Fargo, ND
Feb 29, 2020; 4:00 pm, MidcoSN2/ESPN3		Omaha	W 87–67	22–8 (13–3)	Scheels Center (3,758); Fargo, ND
The Summit League tournament
Mar 7, 2020; 6:00 pm, MidcoSN	(1)	vs. (8) Denver; Quarterfinals	W 71–69	23–8	Denny Sanford Premier Center (8,614); Sioux Falls, SD
Mar 9, 2020; 6:00 pm, MidcoSN	(1)	vs. (4) Oral Roberts; Semifinals	W 75–69	24–8	Denny Sanford Premier Center (4,761); Sioux Falls, SD
Mar 10, 2020; 8:00 pm, ESPN2	(1)	vs. (6) North Dakota; Championship	W 89–53	25–8	Denny Sanford Premier Center (4,306); Sioux Falls, SD
*Non-conference game. ^{#}Rankings from AP Poll. (#) Tournament seedings in parentheses. All times are in Central Time.
