= 2019–20 Omaha Mavericks men's basketball team =

American college basketball season

2019–20 Omaha Mavericks men's basketball
- Conference: Summit League
- Record: 16–16 (9–7 The Summit)
- Head coach: Derrin Hansen (15th season)
- Assistant coaches: Pat Eberhart; Tyler Erwin; Tyler Bullock
- Home arena: Baxter Arena

2019–20 Summit League men's basketball standings
	Conf.				Overall
Team	W		L	PCT	W		L	PCT
North Dakota State †	13	–	3	.813	25	–	8	.758
South Dakota State	13	–	3	.813	22	–	10	.688
South Dakota	10	–	6	.625	20	–	12	.625
Oral Roberts	9	–	7	.563	17	–	14	.548
Omaha	9	–	7	.563	16	–	16	.500
North Dakota	7	–	9	.438	15	–	18	.455
Purdue Fort Wayne	6	–	10	.375	14	–	19	.424
Denver	3	–	13	.188	7	–	24	.226
Western Illinois	2	–	14	.125	5	–	21	.192
† 2020 Summit League Tournament winner

The 2019–20 Omaha Mavericks men's basketball team represented the University of Nebraska Omaha in the 2019–20 NCAA Division I men's basketball season. The Mavericks, led by 15th-year head coach Derrin Hansen, played their home games at Baxter Arena in Omaha, Nebraska as members of the Summit League. They finished the season 16–16, 9–7 in Summit League play, to finish in a tie for fourth place. They lost in the quarterfinals of the Summit League tournament to Oral Roberts.

== Previous season ==
The Mavericks finished the 2018–19 season 21–11 overall, 13–3 in Summit League play, to finish in second place. In the Summit League tournament, they defeated North Dakota in the quarterfinals and Purdue Fort Wayne in the semifinals, before advancing to the championship game, where they fell to North Dakota State.

== Roster ==
2019–20 Omaha Mavericks men's basketball team
Players
Coaches

Pos.	#	Name	Height	Weight	Year	Hometown
G	0	JT Gibson	6 ft 3 in (1.91 m)	195 lb (88 kg)	Sr	Brooklyn Park, MN
G/F	2	Darrius Hughes	6 ft 7 in (2.01 m)	230 lb (104 kg)	Fr	Kansas City, MO
G	3	Kyle Luedtke	6 ft 5 in (1.96 m)	190 lb (86 kg)	RS Fr	Omaha, NE
G	4	Zach Thornhill	6 ft 4 in (1.93 m)	185 lb (84 kg)	So	Lenexa, Kansas
G	5	K. J. Robinson	6 ft 0 in (1.83 m)	190 lb (86 kg)	Sr	Blue Springs, MO
G	10	Ayo Akinwole	6 ft 0 in (1.83 m)	165 lb (75 kg)	Jr	Papillion, NE
G	11	La'Mel Robinson	6 ft 0 in (1.83 m)	160 lb (73 kg)	Fr	Riverside, MO
F	13	Wanjang Tut	6 ft 8 in (2.03 m)	205 lb (93 kg)	So	Omaha, NE
G	15	Grant Frickenstein	6 ft 3 in (1.91 m)	170 lb (77 kg)	Fr	Fremont, NE
G	20	Hayden Miller	6 ft 1 in (1.85 m)	180 lb (82 kg)	So	Nebraska City, NE
G	22	Marco Smith	6 ft 2 in (1.88 m)	175 lb (79 kg)	So	Kansas City, KS
G/F	23	Marlon Ruffin	6 ft 5 in (1.96 m)	195 lb (88 kg)	So	Madison, WI
C	24	Nathan Brusseau	6 ft 11 in (2.11 m)	225 lb (102 kg)	Fr	New Prague, MN
F	40	Matt Pile	6 ft 8 in (2.03 m)	240 lb (109 kg)	Jr	Wichita, KS

Head coach

- Derrin Hansen (Nebraska Wesleyan)

Assistant coach(es)

- Pat Eberhart (Adams State)
- Tyler Erwin (Midland)
- Tyler Bullock (Omaha)

Legend

- (C) Team captain
- (S) Suspended
- (I) Ineligible
- (W) Walk-on
- Injured
- Current redshirt

Roster
Last update: December 15, 2019

== Schedule and results ==
Date time, TV	Rank^{#}	Opponent^{#}	Result	Record	Site (attendance) city, state
Non-conference regular season
November 5, 2019*; 7:00 p.m., YurView		at Wichita State	L 54–68	0–1	Charles Koch Arena (10,056); Wichita, KS
November 7, 2019*; 12:00 p.m.		Midland	W 72–53	1–1	Baxter Arena (2,288); Omaha, NE
November 11, 2019*; 7:30 p.m.		Bethune–Cookman	W 90–61	2–1	Baxter Arena (2,112); Omaha, NE
November 13, 2019*; 8:00 p.m., Mountain West Network		at Colorado State; Cayman Islands Classic campus-site game	L 65–80	2–2	Moby Arena (2,280); Fort Collins, CO
November 19, 2019*; 6:00 p.m., ESPN+		at Dayton	L 68–93	2–3	UD Arena (13,193); Dayton, OH
November 21, 2019*; 6:00 p.m., P12N		at Washington State; Cayman Islands Classic campus-site game	W 85–77	3–3	Beasley Coliseum (2,204); Pullman, WA
November 25, 2019*; 7:00 p.m.		Southern; The Mainland Tournament at Omaha (Cayman Islands Classic)	W 78–51	4–3	Baxter Arena (1,694); Omaha, NE
November 26, 2019*; 7:00 p.m.		Loyola (MD); The Mainland Tournament at Omaha (Cayman Islands Classic)	W 70–65	5–3	Baxter Arena (1,806); Omaha, NE
December 1, 2019*; 7:00 p.m., WCC Network		at Saint Mary's	L 66–75	5–4	University Credit Union Pavilion (2,766); Moraga, CA
December 3, 2019*; 7:00 p.m., ESPN+		at Arkansas State	L 73–78	5–5	First National Bank Arena (1,126); Jonesboro, AR
December 8, 2019*; 4:00 p.m., Pluto TV		at Northern Arizona	L 65–73	5–6	Findlay Toyota Center (303); Prescott Valley, AZ
December 11, 2019*; 7:00 p.m., P12N		at No. 15 Arizona	L 49–99	5–7	McKale Center (13,256); Tucson, AZ
December 15, 2019*; 12:30 p.m.		Texas–Rio Grande Valley; Western Athletic ConferenceWAC/Summit League Challenge	W 92–82	6–7	Baxter Arena (2,840); Omaha, NE
December 17, 2019*; 8:05 p.m., Pluto TV		at Eastern Washington; Big Sky/Summit League Challenge	L 56–97	6–8	Reese Court (1,054); Cheney, WA
December 21, 2019*; 12:00 p.m.		Montana; Big Sky/Summit League Challenge	W 87–82	7–8	Baxter Arena (2,778); Omaha, NE
Summit League regular season
December 29, 2019; 4:30 p.m., YurView/MidcoSN/ESPN+		South Dakota State	W 81–78	8–8 (1–0)	Baxter Arena (4,234); Omaha, NE
January 4, 2020; 7:00 p.m.		Oral Roberts	W 74–67	9–8 (2–0)	Baxter Arena (2,251); Omaha, NE
January 8, 2020; 7:00 p.m., YurView/MidcoSN/ESPN+		at North Dakota	W 66–62	10–8 (3–0)	Betty Engelstad Sioux Center (1,415); Grand Forks, ND
January 11, 2020; 3:30 p.m., YurView/MidcoSN/ESPN3		at South Dakota	L 81–91	10–9 (3–1)	Sanford Coyote Sports Center (2,617); Vermillion, SD
January 18, 2020; 2:00 p.m.		at Denver	L 76–91	10–10 (3–2)	Magness Arena (1,322); Denver, CO
January 23, 2020; 7:00 p.m.		Western Illinois	W 87–82 ^{OT}	11–10 (4–2)	Baxter Arena (1,775); Omaha, NE
January 25, 2020; 7:00 p.m.		Purdue Fort Wayne	W 75–71	12–10 (5–2)	Baxter Arena (2,704); Omaha, NE
February 2, 2020; 12:00 p.m., YurView/MidcoSN/ESPN3		South Dakota	L 80–81	12–11 (5–3)	Baxter Arena (2,173); Omaha, NE
February 5, 2020; 7:00 p.m., YurView/MidcoSN/ESPN+		North Dakota State	L 78–86	12–12 (5–4)	Baxter Arena (2,355); Omaha, NE
February 8, 2020; 4:15 p.m.		at South Dakota State	L 64–81	12–13 (5–5)	Frost Arena (3,845); Brookings, SD
February 12, 2020; 7:00 p.m., ESPN3		at Oral Roberts	L 78–81 ^{OT}	12–14 (5–6)	Mabee Center (1,869); Tulsa, OK
February 16, 2020; 4:30 p.m.		Denver	W 85–62	13–14 (6–6)	Baxter Arena (1,958); Omaha, NE
February 20, 2020; 6:00 p.m.		at Purdue Fort Wayne	W 61–59	14–14 (7–6)	Gates Sports Center (846); Fort Wayne, IN
February 22, 2020; 2:00 p.m.		at Western Illinois	W 93–86	15–14 (8–6)	Western Hall; Macomb, IL
February 26, 2020; 7:30 p.m., YurView/MidcoSN/ESPN+		North Dakota	W 84–83 ^{OT}	16–14 (9–6)	Baxter Arena (2,536); Omaha, NE
February 29, 2020; 4:00 p.m., YurView/MidcoSN2/ESPN3		at North Dakota State	L 67–87	16–15 (9–7)	Scheels Center (3,758); Fargo, ND
Summit League tournament
March 8, 2020; 6:00 p.m., MidcoSN	(5)	(4) Oral Roberts; Quarterfinals	L 52–79	16–16	Premier Center (6,414); Sioux Falls, SD
*Non-conference game. ^{#}Rankings from AP poll. (#) Tournament seedings in parentheses. All times are in Central.
