= 2019–20 North Dakota Fighting Hawks men's basketball team =

American college basketball season

2019–20 North Dakota Fighting Hawks men's basketball
- Conference: Summit League
- Record: 15–18 (7–9 The Summit)
- Head coach: Paul Sather (1st season)
- Assistant coaches: Jamie Stevens; Zach Horstman; Dani Mihailovic
- Home arena: Betty Engelstad Sioux Center

2019–20 Summit League men's basketball standings
	Conf.				Overall
Team	W		L	PCT	W		L	PCT
North Dakota State †	13	–	3	.813	25	–	8	.758
South Dakota State	13	–	3	.813	22	–	10	.688
South Dakota	10	–	6	.625	20	–	12	.625
Oral Roberts	9	–	7	.563	17	–	14	.548
Omaha	9	–	7	.563	16	–	16	.500
North Dakota	7	–	9	.438	15	–	18	.455
Purdue Fort Wayne	6	–	10	.375	14	–	19	.424
Denver	3	–	13	.188	7	–	24	.226
Western Illinois	2	–	14	.125	5	–	21	.192
† 2020 Summit League Tournament winner

The 2019–20 North Dakota Fighting Hawks men's basketball team represented the University of North Dakota in the 2019–20 NCAA Division I men's basketball season. The Fighting Hawks, led by first-year head coach Paul Sather, played their home games at the Betty Engelstad Sioux Center in Grand Forks, North Dakota as members of the Summit League. They finished the season 15–18, 7–9 in Summit League play to finish in sixth place. They defeated South Dakota and Purdue Fort Wayne to advance to the championship game of the Summit League tournament where they lost to North Dakota State.

== Previous season ==
The Fighting Hawks finished the 2018–19 season 12–18 overall, 6–10 in Summit League play, to finish in 7th place. In the Summit League tournament, they were defeated by Omaha in the quarterfinals.

On May 1, 2019, it was announced that head coach Brian Jones, who had led the team for the past 13 years, was stepping down, in order to take the associate head coaching position at Illinois State. On May 30, head coach of DII Northern State, Paul Sather, was announced as Jones' replacement.

== Roster ==
2019–20 North Dakota Fighting Hawks men's basketball team
Players
Coaches

Pos.	#	Name	Height	Weight	Year	Hometown
G	1	Marlon Stewart	6 ft 3 in (1.91 m)	209 lb (95 kg)	Sr	Rock Island, Illinois
G	2	Carlos Ramsey Jr. (redshirt)	6 ft 5 in (1.96 m)	180 lb (82 kg)	Fr	Milwaukee, Wisconsin
G	3	Billy Brown	6 ft 3 in (1.91 m)	195 lb (88 kg)	Sr	Spirit Lake, Iowa
G	4	Davids Atelbauers	6 ft 1 in (1.85 m)	177 lb (80 kg)	So	Ogre, Latvia
F	5	Zac Saddler	6 ft 7 in (2.01 m)	207 lb (94 kg)	Jr	New Braunfels, Texas
G	10	Aanen Moody	6 ft 3 in (1.91 m)	175 lb (79 kg)	So	Dickinson, North Dakota
G	11	Bentiu Panoam	6 ft 2 in (1.88 m)	160 lb (73 kg)	Jr	Anchorage, Alaska
F	12	Filip Rebrača	6 ft 9 in (2.06 m)	220 lb (100 kg)	So	Sombor, Serbia
F	13	Marko Coudreau	6 ft 9 in (2.06 m)	230 lb (104 kg)	So	Marseille, France
F	15	Brady Danielson	6 ft 4 in (1.93 m)	197 lb (89 kg)	Fr	York, Nebraska
G	21	Ethan Igbanugo	6 ft 2 in (1.88 m)	187 lb (85 kg)	So	Lakeville, Minnesota
F	23	Kienan Walter	6 ft 9 in (2.06 m)	205 lb (93 kg)	Sr	Vancouver, Washington
F	24	Elijah Hazekamp (redshirt)	6 ft 6 in (1.98 m)	206 lb (93 kg)	So	Sioux City, Iowa
F	32	Gertautas Urbonavicius	6 ft 7 in (2.01 m)	227 lb (103 kg)	Fr	Vilnius, Lithuania
G	34	De'Sean Allen-Eikens	6 ft 6 in (1.98 m)	212 lb (96 kg)	RS Fr	Williston, North Dakota

Head coach

- Paul Sather (Northern State)

Assistant coach(es)

- Jamie Stevens (Montana State Billings)
- Zach Horstman (Northern State)
- Dani Mihailovic

Legend

- (C) Team captain
- (S) Suspended
- (I) Ineligible
- (W) Walk-on
- Injured
- Current redshirt

Roster
Last update: December 17, 2019

== Schedule and results ==
Date time, TV	Rank^{#}	Opponent^{#}	Result	Record	Site (attendance) city, state
Non-conference regular season
November 7, 2019*; 7:00 pm		Crown	W 86–61	1–0	Betty Engelstad Sioux Center (1,521); Grand Forks, ND
November 12, 2019*; 8:00 pm		at No. 8 Gonzaga	L 66–97	1–1	McCarthey Athletic Center (6,000); Spokane, WA
November 17, 2019*; 1:30 pm, ESPN3		at Valparaiso	L 60–74	1–2	Athletics–Recreation Center (2,504); Valparaiso, IN
November 19, 2019*; 8:00 pm, ESPN+		at Milwaukee	L 70–79	1–3	UW–Milwaukee Panther Arena (971); Milwaukee, WI
November 24, 2019*; 6:00 pm, BTN		at Minnesota	L 56–79	1–4	Williams Arena (8,854); Minneapolis, MN
November 26, 2019*; 8:30 pm		North Central	W 115–50	2–4	Betty Engelstad Sioux Center (1,348); Grand Forks, ND
November 29, 2019*; 6:00 pm, ESPN+		at Florida Gulf Coast; FGCU Classic	W 78–63	3–4	Alico Arena (2,244); Fort Myers, FL
November 30, 2019*; 3:30 pm		vs. Georgia Southern; FGCU Classic	W 80–68	4–4	Alico Arena (376); Fort Myers, FL
December 1, 2019*; 11:00 am		vs. Campbell; FGCU Classic	L 56–58	4–5	Alico Arena (103); Fort Myers, FL
December 6, 2019*; 8:00 pm		at Montana	L 70–77	4–6	Dahlberg Arena (3,698); Missoula, MT
December 8, 2019*; 5:30 pm		at Eastern Washington	L 82–98	4–7	Reese Court (1,353); Cheney, WA
December 17, 2019*; 7:00 pm		Northland	W 109–50	5–7	Betty Engelstad Sioux Center (1,091); Grand Forks, ND
December 21, 2019*; 5:00 pm, BTN+		at Nebraska	W 75–74	6–7	Pinnacle Bank Arena (15,010); Lincoln, NE
December 29, 2019*; 5:00 pm, P12N		at Oregon State	L 66–83	6–8	Gill Coliseum (4,364); Corvallis, OR
Summit League regular season
January 2, 2020; 8:00 pm, Altitude 2		at Denver	W 82–71	7–8 (1–0)	Magness Arena (742); Denver, CO
January 5, 2020; 4:30 pm, MidcoSN/ESPN+		Purdue Fort Wayne	W 83–69	8–8 (2–0)	Betty Engelstad Sioux Center (1,280); Grand Forks, ND
January 8, 2020; 7:00 pm, MidcoSN/ESPN+		Omaha	L 62–66	8–9 (2–1)	Betty Engelstad Sioux Center (1,415); Grand Forks, ND
January 11, 2020; 7:00 pm, ESPN3		at Oral Roberts	L 73–88	8–10 (2–2)	Mabee Center (1,840); Tulsa, OK
January 15, 2020; 7:00 pm, MidcoSN/ESPN+		at South Dakota State	L 66–87	8–11 (2–3)	Frost Arena (2,271); Brookings, SD
January 19, 2020 (Note: Game postponed from 1-18-20 @ 2 pm to 1-19-20 @ 1 pm due to weather. https://www.kvrr.com/2020/01/17/ndsu-und-basketball-game-moved-to-sunday-due-to-weather/); 1:00 pm, MidcoSN2/ESPN3		at North Dakota State	L 74–83	8–12 (2–4)	Scheels Center (3,817); Fargo, ND
January 23, 2020; 7:00 pm, MidcoSN/ESPN+		Denver	W 78–71	9–12 (3–4)	Betty Engelstad Sioux Center (1,388); Grand Forks, ND
January 25, 2020; 7:00 pm, FSN		Western Illinois	W 83–77	10–12 (4–4)	Betty Engelstad Sioux Center (1,585); Grand Forks, ND
January 30, 2020; 6:30 pm		at Purdue Fort Wayne	L 68–72	10–13 (4–5)	Memorial Coliseum (1,379); Fort Wayne, IN
February 6, 2020; 7:00 pm, MidcoSN/ESPN+		Oral Roberts	W 74–68	11–13 (5–5)	Betty Engelstad Sioux Center (1,372); Grand Forks, ND
February 8, 2020; 2:00 pm, MidcoSN/ESPN3		South Dakota	L 68–82	11–14 (5–6)	Betty Engelstad Sioux Center (1,670); Grand Forks, ND
February 15, 2020; 7:00 pm, ESPN3		at Western Illinois	W 86–83 ^{OT}	12–14 (6–6)	Western Hall (1,138); Macomb, IL
February 19, 2020; 7:00 pm, MidcoSN/ESPN+		South Dakota State	L 83–94	12–15 (6–7)	Betty Engelstad Sioux Center (1,702); Grand Forks, ND
February 22, 2020; 7:00 pm, MidcoSN/ESPN3		North Dakota State	W 71–68	13–15 (7–7)	Betty Engelstad Sioux Center (2,686); Grand Forks, ND
February 26, 2020; 7:00 pm, MidcoSN/ESPN+		at Omaha	L 83–84 ^{OT}	13–16 (7–8)	Baxter Arena (2,536); Omaha, NE
February 29, 2020; 3:30 pm		at South Dakota	L 67–77	13–17 (7–9)	Sanford Coyote Sports Center (3,929); Vermillion, SD
Summit League tournament
March 8, 2020; 8:30 pm, MidcoSN	(6)	vs. (3) South Dakota; Quarterfinals	W 74–71	14–17	Premier Center (6,414); Sioux Falls, SD
March 9, 2020; 8:30 pm, MidcoSN	(6)	vs. (7) Purdue Fort Wayne; Semifinals	W 73–56	15–17	Premier Center (4,761); Sioux Falls, SD
March 10, 2020; 8:00 pm, ESPN2	(6)	vs. (1) North Dakota State; Championship	L 53–89	15–18	Premier Center (4,306); Sioux Falls, SD
*Non-conference game. ^{#}Rankings from AP Poll. (#) Tournament seedings in parentheses. All times are in Central.
