= Newman Smith High School =

Location
- 2335 North Josey Lane; Carrollton, Dallas County, Texas, 75007; United States; 32.97954°N 96.89158°W

Information
- School type: Public, Secondary
- School district: Carrollton-Farmers Branch Independent School District
- Principal: Stephanie Martin Jimenez
- Staff: 140.99 (FTE)
- Grades: 9th through 12th
- Enrollment: 1,937 (2023-2024)
- Student to teacher ratio: 13.74
- Colors: Green and Gold
- Mascot: Trojan
- Rivals: Creekview High School Mustangs
- Website: Newman Smith High School

Newman Smith High School is a public high school in Carrollton, Texas, United States in the Carrollton-Farmers Branch Independent School District. The school opened in 1975 and is named after the former CFBISD superintendent Newman Smith. Smith High School serves sections of Carrollton and Dallas. In 2015, the school was rated "Met Standard" by the Texas Education Agency.

== History ==
In the 1970s, enrollment at R.L. Turner High School had passed 3,000 students, so a site near Josey Lane and Jackson Road was acquired for a second campus. The new facility opened in the fall of 1975, housing eighth and ninth-grade students living north of Belt Line Road. During the second year, the school housed ninth and tenth-grade students. The third year the school housed eighth through eleventh grade. And the fourth year, the school housed eighth through twelfth-grade students. The first graduating class was in 1979, with students attending four years, and the class of 1980 had attended five years.

In 1981 the eighth-grade classes were moved to the newly completed North Carrollton Junior High School (now Dan F. Long Middle School) and an auditorium and second cafeteria were added. Newman Smith's student population grew rapidly in the 1980s and 1990s as new housing developments were built in north area of Carrollton. To relieve the overcrowding, Smith's boundaries were adjusted in 1988, moving approximately five hundred students who lived south of Jackson and Keller Springs roads back to R.L. Turner, which had excess capacity at the time.

By the mid-1990s enrollment at Newman Smith was nearing 3,000 students and construction began on Creekview High School, the district's third. It was opened in the fall of 1998 and Smith's southern attendance boundary was moved back to Belt Line Road. The northern boundary was set along the newly opened President George Bush Turnpike. Today, Newman Smith High School serves all students from Ted Polk Middle School, as well as some students from DeWitt Perry and Dan F. Long Middle Schools.

Newman Smith also admits any students within the district if they would like to join the International Business Academy.

== Achievements ==
In 1998, Newman Smith High School was selected as a United States Department of Education New American High School and Blue Ribbon School of Excellence.

=== Marching band ===
The Trojan Band performed in 5A UIL State competition in 1982 and 2000 and 4A UIL State competition in 2009, 2011, and 2013, with the '09 and '11 groups becoming the first in school history to achieve this feat back-to-back. The '00 Trojan Band was an alternate and did not originally qualify. In 2009, the band placed first in the 4A UIL Area B competition to qualify for State, then made finals at State with a record third place ranking in prelims. They placed sixth in the final round, the only top-ten finish or finals appearance for the Trojan Band to date. In 2011 the band placed 14th in State after placing fourth in Area B. In 2013, the band placed second at Area B in an upset finish, but placed 11th at State, missing finals by one place.

== Sports ==
Newman Smith switched from class 5A to 4A in 2008 due to a school population decrease. In 2013, the classification system was changed and Smith became class 5A again.

== Notable alumni ==
- Anthony Armstrong - professional football wide receiver.
- Andrew Brown - professional baseball outfielder.
- Deondre Burns (born 1997) - basketball player in the Israeli Basketball Premier League
- Preston Claiborne - professional baseball pitcher.
- Jason Maxiell - professional basketball player.
- Courtney Okolo: Olympic track and field sprinter gold medalist.
- Brian Watts - professional golfer.
