= 2019–20 Denver Pioneers men's basketball team =

American college basketball season

2019–20 Denver Pioneers men's basketball
- Conference: Summit League
- Record: 7–24 (3–13 The Summit)
- Head coach: Rodney Billups (4th season)
- Assistant coaches: Bacari Alexander; Raman Sposato; Dwight Thorne II
- Home arena: Magness Arena

2019–20 Summit League men's basketball standings
	Conf.				Overall
Team	W		L	PCT	W		L	PCT
North Dakota State †	13	–	3	.813	25	–	8	.758
South Dakota State	13	–	3	.813	22	–	10	.688
South Dakota	10	–	6	.625	20	–	12	.625
Oral Roberts	9	–	7	.563	17	–	14	.548
Omaha	9	–	7	.563	16	–	16	.500
North Dakota	7	–	9	.438	15	–	18	.455
Purdue Fort Wayne	6	–	10	.375	14	–	19	.424
Denver	3	–	13	.188	7	–	24	.226
Western Illinois	2	–	14	.125	5	–	21	.192
† 2020 Summit League Tournament winner

The 2019–20 Denver Pioneers men's basketball team represented the University of Denver in the 2019–20 NCAA Division I men's basketball season. The Pioneers, led by fourth-year head coach Rodney Billups, played their home games at Magness Arena in Denver, Colorado, with two games at Hamilton Gymnasium, as members of the Summit League. They finished the season 7–24, 3–13 in Summit League play, to finish in eighth place. They lost in the quarterfinals of the Summit League tournament to North Dakota State.

== Previous season ==
The Pioneers finished the 2018–19 season 8–22, 3–13 in Summit League play, to finish in last place. They failed to qualify for the 2019 Summit League tournament.

== Roster ==
2019–20 Denver Pioneers men's basketball team
Players
Coaches

Pos.	#	Name	Height	Weight	Year	Hometown
G	0	Ade Murkey	6 ft 5 in (1.96 m)	200 lb (91 kg)	Sr	Minneapolis, MN
F	1	David Nzekwesi	6 ft 9 in (2.06 m)	240 lb (109 kg)	So	The Hague, Netherlands
G	2	Roscoe Eastmond	5 ft 9 in (1.75 m)	150 lb (68 kg)	Fr	Marietta, GA
G	3	Jase Townsend	6 ft 3 in (1.91 m)	175 lb (79 kg)	So	Dallas, TX
G	4	Taelyr Gatlin	6 ft 3 in (1.91 m)	180 lb (82 kg)	So	Atoka, TN
G	5	Ray Kowalski	6 ft 3 in (1.91 m)	190 lb (86 kg)	Jr	Concord, NC
G	10	Joseph Lanzi	6 ft 5 in (1.96 m)	195 lb (88 kg)	So	Birmingham, AL
G/F	11	Owen McGlashan	6 ft 7 in (2.01 m)	205 lb (93 kg)	Fr	Marlton, NJ
F	12	Alperen Kurnaz	6 ft 8 in (2.03 m)	220 lb (100 kg)	So	Istanbul, Turkey
G	13	Khalil Johnson	6 ft 3 in (1.91 m)	170 lb (77 kg)	So	Long Island, NY
G	14	Ryan Heath	6 ft 5 in (1.96 m)	190 lb (86 kg)	Fr	Lansing, MI
F	21	Robert Jones	6 ft 10 in (2.08 m)	225 lb (102 kg)	Fr	Prior Lake, MN
F	22	Tristan Green	6 ft 9 in (2.06 m)	200 lb (91 kg)	So	Boerne, TX
F	34	James IV Sanders	6 ft 5 in (1.96 m)	200 lb (91 kg)	Fr	Fountain, CO
F	42	JaVonni Bickham	6 ft 6 in (1.98 m)	225 lb (102 kg)	RS Fr	Minneapolis, MN

Head coach

- Rodney Billups (Denver)

Assistant coach(es)

- Bacari Alexander (Detroit Mercy)
- Raman Sposato (Oregon)
- Dwight Thorne II (Colorado)

Legend

- (C) Team captain
- (S) Suspended
- (I) Ineligible
- (W) Walk-on
- Injured
- Current redshirt

Roster
Last update: December 17, 2019

== Schedule and results ==
Date time, TV	Rank^{#}	Opponent^{#}	Result	Record	Site (attendance) city, state
Exhibition
November 1, 2019*; 6:00 p.m.		Johnson & Wales (Denver)	W 85–51		Hamilton Gymnasium (701); Denver, CO
Non-conference regular season
November 5, 2019*; 7:00 p.m., Mountain West Network		at Colorado State	L 63–74	0–1	Moby Arena (2,322); Fort Collins, CO
November 9, 2019*; 1:00 p.m., Altitude		Utah Valley	W 74–62	1–1	Magness Arena (921); Denver, CO
November 12, 2019*; 7:00 p.m., Mountain West Network		at No. 17 Utah State	L 56–97	1–2	Smith Spectrum (6,504); Logan, UT
November 16, 2019*; 1:00 p.m.		Western Colorado	W 72–55	2–2	Hamilton Gymnasium (772); Denver, CO
November 23, 2019*; 4:00 p.m.		at UC Riverside	L 49–73	2–3	SRC Arena (702); Riverside, CA
November 27, 2019*; 5:30 p.m.		at Santa Clara; Cable Car Classic	L 64–81	2–4	Leavey Center (912); Santa Clara, CA
November 29, 2019*; 5:30 p.m.		vs. Cal State Fullerton; Cable Car Classic	W 65–62	3–4	Leavey Center (1,009); Santa Clara, CA
November 30, 2019*; 2:00 p.m.		vs. Southeast Missouri State; Cable Car Classic	L 51–66	3–5	Leavey Center (993); Santa Clara, CA
December 3, 2019*; 7:00 p.m.		Jackson State	W 67–58	4–5	Magness Arena (497); Denver, CO
December 8, 2019*; 3:00 p.m., P12N		at UCLA	L 62–81	4–6	Pauley Pavilion (5,243); Los Angeles, CA
December 10, 2019*; 7:00 p.m., Altitude 2		New Mexico State; Summit League/WAC Challenge	L 67–72	4–7	Magness Arena (910); Denver, CO
December 14, 2019*; 1:00 p.m., Altitude		Air Force	L 75–79	4–8	Magness Arena (1,170); Denver, CO
December 17, 2019*; 7:00 p.m., Pluto TV		at Northern Colorado	L 64–86	4–9	Bank of Colorado Arena (1,460); Greeley, CO
December 21, 2019*; 1:00 p.m., Altitude		Wyoming	L 66–72 ^{OT}	4–10	Magness Arena (1,543); Denver, CO
Summit League regular season
December 29, 2019; 3:30 p.m., Altitude 2		North Dakota State	L 55–66	4–11 (0–1)	Magness Arena (1,059); Denver, CO
January 2, 2020; 7:00 p.m., Altitude 2		North Dakota	L 71–82	4–12 (0–2)	Magness Arena (742); Denver, CO
January 5, 2020; 2:30 p.m.		at South Dakota	L 78–80	4–13 (0–3)	Sanford Coyote Sports Center (2,014); Vermillion, SD
January 8, 2020; 7:00 p.m., Altitude 2		South Dakota State	L 68–80	4–14 (0–4)	Magness Arena (774); Denver, CO
January 11, 2020; 1:00 p.m.		at Western Illinois	L 80–86	4–15 (0–5)	Western Hall (347); Macomb, IL
January 18, 2020; 1:00 p.m.		Omaha	W 91–76	5–15 (1–5)	Hamilton Gymnasium (1,322); Denver, CO
January 23, 2020; 6:00 p.m., ESPN+		at North Dakota	L 71–78	5–16 (1–6)	Betty Engelstad Sioux Center (1,388); Grand Forks, ND
January 25, 2020; 1:00 p.m., ESPN3		at North Dakota State	L 70–82	5–17 (1–7)	Scheels Center (3,006); Fargo, ND
January 30, 2020; 7:00 p.m., Altitude		South Dakota	L 87–93	5–18 (1–8)	Magness Arena (805); Denver, CO
February 1, 2020; 6:00 p.m.		at Oral Roberts	L 77–86	5–19 (1–9)	Mabee Center (2,163); Tulsa, OK
February 8, 2020; 3:30 p.m.		Purdue Fort Wayne	L 63–70	5–20 (1–10)	Magness Arena (1,080); Denver, CO
February 14, 2020; 6:00 p.m.		at South Dakota State	L 78–90	5–21 (1–11)	Frost Arena (2,242); Brookings, SD
February 16, 2020; 3:30 p.m.		at Omaha	L 62–85	5–22 (1–12)	Baxter Arena (1,958); Omaha, NE
February 20, 2020; 7:00 p.m., Altitude		Oral Roberts	W 100–96 ^{OT}	6–22 (2–12)	Magness Arena (875); Denver, CO
February 26, 2020; 5:00 p.m.		at Purdue Fort Wayne	L 51–58	6–23 (2–13)	Gates Sports Center (756); Fort Wayne, IN
February 29, 2020; 1:00 p.m., Altitude		Western Illinois	W 69–63	7–23 (3–13)	Magness Arena (1,390); Denver, CO
Summit League tournament
March 7, 2020; 5:00 p.m., MidcoSN	(8)	vs. (1) North Dakota State; Quarterfinals	L 69–71	7–24	Premier Center (8,614); Sioux Falls, SD
*Non-conference game. ^{#}Rankings from AP poll. (#) Tournament seedings in parentheses. All times are in Mountain.
