= 2020 Summit League men's basketball tournament =

- Classification: Division I
- Season: 2019–20
- Teams: 8
- Site: Denny Sanford Premier Center; Sioux Falls, South Dakota, US
- Champions: North Dakota State (5th title)
- Winning coach: David Richman (3rd title)
- MVP: Vinnie Shahid (North Dakota State)
- Television: MidcoSN/MidcoSN2/ESPN+/ESPN2

2019–20 Summit League men's basketball standings
	Conf.				Overall
Team	W		L	PCT	W		L	PCT
North Dakota State †	13	–	3	.813	25	–	8	.758
South Dakota State	13	–	3	.813	22	–	10	.688
South Dakota	10	–	6	.625	20	–	12	.625
Oral Roberts	9	–	7	.563	17	–	14	.548
Omaha	9	–	7	.563	16	–	16	.500
North Dakota	7	–	9	.438	15	–	18	.455
Purdue Fort Wayne	6	–	10	.375	14	–	19	.424
Denver	3	–	13	.188	7	–	24	.226
Western Illinois	2	–	14	.125	5	–	21	.192
† 2020 Summit League Tournament winner

The 2020 Summit League men's basketball tournament was the postseason men's basketball tournament for the Summit League for the 2019–20 season. All tournament games were played at the Denny Sanford Premier Center in Sioux Falls, South Dakota, United States, from March 7–10, 2020. First-seeded North Dakota State defeated North Dakota, 89–53, to set the Summit League Tournament record for the largest margin victory in the title game. They earned the Summit League's automatic bid to the NCAA Tournament, but it was canceled days after NDSU won due to the COVID-19 Pandemic.

== Seeds ==
The top eight teams by conference record in the Summit League compete in the conference tournament. Teams are seeded by record within the conference, with a tiebreaker system to seed teams with identical conference records. The tiebreakers operate in the following order:

1. Head-to-head record.
2. Record against the top-seeded team not involved in the tie, going down through the standings until the tie is broken.

Seed	School	Conf. record	Tiebreaker(s)
1	North Dakota State	13–3	1–1 vs. SDSU; 2–0 vs. USD
2	South Dakota State	13–3	1–1 vs. NDSU; 1–1 vs. USD
3	South Dakota	10–6	
4	Oral Roberts	9–7	1–1 vs. Omaha; 1–1 vs. NDSU
5	Omaha	9–7	1–1 vs. ORU; 0–2 vs. NDSU
6	North Dakota	7–9	
7	Purdue Fort Wayne	6–10	
8	Denver	3–13	

== Schedule and results ==
Game	Time	Matchup	Score	Television
Quarterfinals – Saturday, March 7
1	6:00 pm	No. 1 North Dakota State vs. No. 8 Denver	71–69	MidcoSN/ESPN+
2	8:30 pm	No. 2 South Dakota State vs. No. 7 Purdue Fort Wayne	74–77	MidcoSN/ESPN+
Quarterfinals – Sunday, March 8
3	6:00 pm	No. 4 Oral Roberts vs. No. 5 Omaha	79–52	MidcoSN/ESPN+
4	8:30 pm	No. 3 South Dakota vs. No. 6 North Dakota	71–74	MidcoSN/ESPN+
Semifinals – Monday, March 9
5	6:00 pm	No. 1 North Dakota State vs. No. 4 Oral Roberts	75–69	MidcoSN/ESPN+
6	8:30 pm	No. 7 Purdue Fort Wayne vs. No. 6 North Dakota	56–73	MidcoSN/ESPN+
Final – Tuesday, March 10
7	8:00 pm	No. 1 North Dakota State vs. No. 6 North Dakota	89–53	ESPN2
*Game times in CST for March 7 quarterfinals, and CDT for March 8 quarterfinals onward. Rankings denote tournament seed. Source: TV availability source:

== Bracket ==
Quarterfinals; March 7 & 8 TV: MidcoSN
1	North Dakota State	71
8	Denver	69
4	Oral Roberts	79
5	Omaha	52
2	South Dakota State	74
7	Purdue Fort Wayne	77
3	South Dakota	71
6	North Dakota	74

Semifinals; March 9 TV: MidcoSN
1	North Dakota State	75
4	Oral Roberts	69
7	Purdue Fort Wayne	56
6	North Dakota	73

Final; March 10; TV: ESPN2
1	North Dakota State	89
6	North Dakota	53

== All-Tournament Team ==
The following players were named to the All-Tournament Team:

Player	School
Vinnie Shahid (MVP)	North Dakota State
Sam Griesel	North Dakota State
Tyson Ward	North Dakota State
Marlon Stewart	North Dakota
Kevin Obanor	Oral Roberts
