= David Richman =

American basketball coach (born 1978)

Current position
- Title: Head coach
- Team: North Dakota State
- Conference: Summit League
- Record: 240–155 (.608)

Biographical details
- Born: May 1, 1978 (age 48); Wahpeton, North Dakota, U.S.
- Education: North Dakota State University (BS, MS)

Playing career
- 1997–1998: NDSCS

Coaching career (HC unless noted)
- 2002–2003: NDSCS (assistant)
- 2003–2005: North Dakota State (GA)
- 2005–2014: North Dakota State (assistant)
- 2014–present: North Dakota State

Head coaching record
- Overall: 240–155 (.608)
- Tournaments: 1–3 (NCAA Division I)

Accomplishments and honors

Championships
- 3 Summit League regular season (2015, 2020, 2026); 4 Summit League tournament (2015, 2019, 2020, 2026)

Awards
- 2× Summit League Coach of the Year (2015, 2026)

David Richman (born May 1, 1978) is an American basketball coach. He is the men's basketball head coach at North Dakota State University, a position he has held since 2015.

== Early life and education ==
Richman was born on May 1, 1978, and grew up in Wahpeton, North Dakota. A 2002 graduate of North Dakota State with a degree in physical education, Richman received a master's degree in sport and recreation management from NDSU in 2005.

== Career ==
He was an assistant coach with the Bison for 11 years. On April 8, 2014, after Saul Philips left to take the head coaching job at Ohio University, Richman was promoted to head coach of the Bison. Athletic director Gene Taylor said the decision to hire from within was easy. "I couldn't be more excited to sit up here as the new head coach at North Dakota State," Richman said. In his rookie year, he was named Summit League Coach of the Year after leading his team to a regular season championship and NCAA Tournament berth.

Richman and his wife, Stephanie, live in West Fargo, North Dakota, with their four daughters.

== Head coaching record ==
Record table
| Season | Team | Overall | Conference | Standing | Postseason |
|---|---|---|---|---|---|
North Dakota State Bison (Summit League) (2014–present)
| 2014–15 | North Dakota State | 23–10 | 12–4 | T–1st | NCAA Division I Round of 64 |
| 2015–16 | North Dakota State | 20–13 | 8–8 | 5th | |
| 2016–17 | North Dakota State | 19–11 | 11–5 | 2nd | |
| 2017–18 | North Dakota State | 15–17 | 5–9 | T–5th | |
| 2018–19 | North Dakota State | 19–16 | 9–7 | T–3rd | NCAA Division I Round of 64 |
| 2019–20 | North Dakota State | 25–8 | 13–3 | T–1st | NCAA Division I* |
| 2020–21 | North Dakota State | 15–12 | 11–5 | 3rd | |
| 2021–22 | North Dakota State | 23–10 | 13–5 | 2nd | |
| 2022–23 | North Dakota State | 16–17 | 11–7 | 3rd | |
| 2023–24 | North Dakota State | 15–17 | 8–8 | 5th | |
| 2024–25 | North Dakota State | 21–11 | 10–6 | 4th | |
| 2025–26 | North Dakota State | 27–8 | 14–2 | 1st | NCAA Division I Round of 64 |
| 2026–27 | North Dakota State | 2–5 | 0–0 | | |
| North Dakota State: | | 240–155 (.608) | 125–69 (.644) | *2020 NCAA Tournament cancelled | |
| Total: | | 240–155 (.608) | | | |
National champion Postseason invitational champion Conference regular season champion Conference regular season and conference tournament champion Division regular season champion Division regular season and conference tournament champion Conference tournament champion
