= Billy Wright (basketball) =

American basketball coach (born 1974)

Current position
- Title: Head coach

Biographical details
- Born: September 15, 1974 (age 52); Richmond, Indiana, U.S.

Playing career
- 1992–1996: Bradley
- Position: Point guard

Coaching career (HC unless noted)
- 1996–2001: Ben Davis HS (JV)
- 2001–2006: Pike HS (assistant)
- 2006–2008: Pike HS
- 2008–2010: Western Illinois (assistant)
- 2010–2013: Western Illinois (assoc. HC)
- 2013–2014: Ball State (assistant)
- 2014–2020: Western Illinois
- 2021–present: Richmond HS

Head coaching record
- Overall: 53–115 (.315)

William Eugene Wright Jr. (born September 15, 1974) is an American basketball coach, currently head coach at Richmond High School in Richmond, Indiana. He was most recently head coach at Western Illinois University. He was recently hired by his high school alma mater Richmond High School to become the head coach of the men's basketball team.

Wright played point guard at Richmond High School (where he led the team to an Indiana state title in 1992) and Bradley University. Following the close of his playing career, Wright moved into coaching. After coaching in the high school ranks for twelve years, he became an assistant coach at Western Illinois in 2008. After a short stint at Ball State during the 2013–14 season, Wright was named head coach at Western Illinois on April 15, 2014. After Wright compiled a record of 53–115 during his six-year tenure, Western Illinois decided not to renew his contract.

On June 29, 2021, he was named head coach at his alma mater, Richmond High School.

== Head coaching record ==
Record table
Season	Team	Overall	Conference	Standing	Postseason
Western Illinois Leathernecks (Summit League) (2014–2020)
2014–15	Western Illinois	8–20	3–13	9th	
2015–16	Western Illinois	10–17	3–13	9th	
2016–17	Western Illinois	8–20	5–11	8th	
2017–18	Western Illinois	12–16	3–11	8th	
2018–19	Western Illinois	10–21	4–12	8th	
2019–20	Western Illinois	5–21	2–14	9th	
Western Illinois:		53–115 (.315)	20–74 (.213)		
Total:		53–115 (.315)			
National champion Postseason invitational champion Conference regular season champion Conference regular season and conference tournament champion Division regular season champion Division regular season and conference tournament champion Conference tournament champion
