= Creekview High School (Texas) =

Public school in Texas, United States

Location
- 3201 Old Denton Road; Carrollton, Texas 75707-3957; United States; 33.0025°N 96.9099°W

Information
- School type: Public high school
- Motto: "Offer the best... Expect the best... Be the best."
- Established: 1998
- Principal: Keith Davis
- Staff: 120.90 (FTE)
- Grades: 9-12
- Enrollment: 1,686 (2025-2026)
- Student to teacher ratio: 13.90
- Campus: Suburban
- Colors: Red and black
- Athletics conference: UIL Class 5A
- Mascot: Mustang
- Rivals: Newman Smith High School Trojans
- Newspaper: Mane Event
- Yearbook: Trail Dust
- Website: creekview.cfbisd.edu

Creekview High School is a public high school located in the city of Carrollton, Texas, United States. It is classified as a 5A school by the UIL. It is a part of the Carrollton-Farmers Branch Independent School District located in southeast Denton County. In 2015, the school was rated "Met Standard" by the Texas Education Agency.

The school currently serves grades 9 through 12. It opened in 1998, on one of the last remaining parcels of open land in the northern section of the district. The school opened with grades 9 and 10, and graduated its first class in 2001.

It addition to portions of Carrollton, it also serves portions of the Dallas city limits.

== Demographics ==
The demographic breakdown of the 1,686 students enrolled for the 2025-2026 school year was:

- Male - 50%
- Female - 50%
- Hispanic - 54.0%
- White - 16.1%
- Black - 13.7%
- Asian - 10.7%
- Two or More Races - 5.2%
- American Indian/Alaska Native - 0.3%
- Native Hawaiian/Pacific Islander - 0.0%

== Sport ==
The Creekview Mustangs compete in the following sports:

- Baseball
- Basketball
- Cross country
- American football
- Golf
- Powerlifting
- Soccer
- Softball
- Swimming and diving
- Tennis
- Track and field
- Volleyball
- Wrestling

=== State titles ===
- Girls' soccer 2004 (5A)

=== Golf ===
In 2008, the girls' golf team won its district tournament by 40 strokes and advanced to regionals in Lubbock. They combined for a team score of 330 and 315, totalling 645 for the two-day tournament. Jennifer Park, freshman, placed first in the tournament while April McCoy, freshman, placed third and Paige Gibson, senior, finished fourth. Other members of the team include Lexi Grimland, sophomore, Lindsey Smith, sophomore, and Emily Campbell, junior. In 2009, the entire girls' golf team made all-district team honors and advanced to the regional tournament, where they finished second. The boys' team also advanced to the regional golf tournament after finishing runner-up in the district tournament. Ryan Berry, senior, Austin Curley, sophomore, and Timothy Smelcer, senior, took all-district honors.

=== American football ===
Garry Monty (1998–2005) (23 wins / 28 losses) began the football program at Creekview. Creekview had one of the most successful teams for any first year program in the state of Texas, going undefeated through their first six games. The Mustangs made the playoffs in their second season of varsity football. In the 2005 football season, the Creekview Mustang team made the state playoffs for the second time. They were the third seed out of district 10-5A and faced Dallas Carter in the first round. They lost, and finished the season 6–5. This was the first season under the new coach Gary Childress (who finished his tenure with the Mustangs with a 21–21 record).

Jay Cline succeeded Gary Childress as the Mustangs' head coach. The team went 2–8 in each of his first two seasons, but in 2013 Cline took the Mustangs to the playoffs for the first time since 2008, and finished the season 6–5. In 2014, Creekview won the district title for the first time and, in 2015, won it again. In both seasons, the Mustangs finished with a record of 8–3. In 2016, Creekview started the season 3–1, and was riding the momentum gained after a come-from-behind victory against R.L. Turner. Despite the early success, the Mustangs went on to lose 6 straight games and to finish 3–7. In 2017, the Mustangs finished 0–10. It was the first time the team finished winless. Jay Cline's overall record as head coach of the Mustangs is currently 34–49.

On April 29, 2006, Travis Wilson (Class of 2002) became the first Creekview alumnus to be drafted to the NFL. Wilson was drafted in the third round of the 2006 NFL draft by the Cleveland Browns. He attended the University of Oklahoma as a wide receiver. Ryan Russell was drafted by the Dallas Cowboys of the NFL. He now plays for the Buffalo Bills. David Blough (Class of 2013) was the starting quarterback for the Purdue Boilermakers football team. He graduated from Purdue in 2019 and now plays for the Arizona Cardinals.

=== Baseball ===
In June 2005, Taylor Teagarden (class of 2002) was drafted in the third round of the Major League Baseball draft by the Texas Rangers after he won the 2005 College World Series with the University of Texas at Austin. During his junior year in college (2005), Teagarden was a finalist for the Johnny Bench Award (the nation's top catcher), First-Team All-Big 12, and was later named to the Big 12 Baseball 10th Anniversary Team. He is a client of Scott Boras. Teagarden made his Major League debut on July 11, 2008. He is the son of the retired Creekview High School counselor Penny Teagarden.

In 2006, the baseball team under coach Brian Jones made the state playoffs for the third time. They were the third seed from district 10-5A and faced Bryan Adams of DISD in the first round. They won the series against Bryan Adams but were beaten in the second round by Tyler Lee. Creekview finished the season 22–9, the baseball team's second best record. In 2011, the team finished with a 24–9 record. The team won its first ever district championship in 2014 under coach Stacy Larson and again in 2015, going undefeated in district, under coach Leroy Mansanales.

After the 2017 season, Mansanales left to pursue a coaching opportunity at Princeton High School. Blake Koch took over as head coach of the Creekview baseball team after his departure.

=== Soccer ===
The girls' varsity soccer team won the 5A state championship in 2004 and was state runner-up in 2006. In 2017, the Lady Mustangs advanced to the second round of the playoffs with seven freshmen on the varsity squad.

=== Track ===
- 2010: eight girls qualified for region 2-5A meet
- 2011: seven girls qualified for region 2-4A meet; one 2nd place in 4A state meet

Sisters Melissa Gonzalez and Samantha Gonzalez, both alumni of Creekview High School, received scholarships to compete in track events. Melissa graduated from the University of Texas at Austin in 2016, and Samantha is a graduate of the University of Miami. In 2021, Melissa competed in the Tokyo 2021 Summer Olympics for Colombia.

=== Cross country ===
- 2003: boys finished second in district 8-5A
- 2003: girls won district 8-5A
- 2005: girls won district 10-5A

=== Wrestling ===
The Creekview wrestling team has had some success under coaches Clay Goodloe and Sean Kitchen. During the 2013–2014 season, the two young coaches' second year, they won two state championships in the 4A division. The female was Bobbi N, and the male was Jorge S. During the 2014–15 season, they had another state title under the same coaches. They won in the girls' 120 weight class, under Leah Olguin. Since the school opened in 1998, it has had 36 state qualifiers in wrestling. The team has also made the titles as district champions many times, and have won the battle of CFB undefeated since its opening. The Mustangs have made state duals for six years in a row, placing in the top 16. During the 2013–14 season, they placed fourth, and in the 2014–15 season, they placed sixth. Both teams had advanced to the region meet five years in a row before the 2006 season.

=== Basketball ===
In 2012, the boys' basketball team made it to the 4A UIL playoffs, and lost to McKinney North High School in the first round. In 2015, the boys' basketball team made it to the 5A UIL playoffs and defeated South Garland High School in the opening round, but lost to Frisco Liberty High School in the second round. Also in 2015, forward DeAndre Abram received multiple scholarships across the country to play college basketball. He signed with, and now competes for, George Mason University. In the 2016–2017 season, the Creekview boys' basketball team made it to the 5A UIL playoffs, where they defeated Frisco Lone Star High School in bi-district, defeated Sulphur Springs High School in the area final, but were defeated by West Mesquite High School in the regional final. This team is considered has made it further in the playoffs than any other team.

== Notable alumni ==
- Jeremy Beal, NFL player
- David Blough, NFL player
- Melissa Gonzalez, Olympic hurdler
- Travis Rountree, drummer of The Ready Set
- Ryan Russell, NFL player
- Taylor Teagarden, Major League Baseball player
- Travis Wilson, NFL player
