= Deondre Burns =

American basketball player (born 1997)

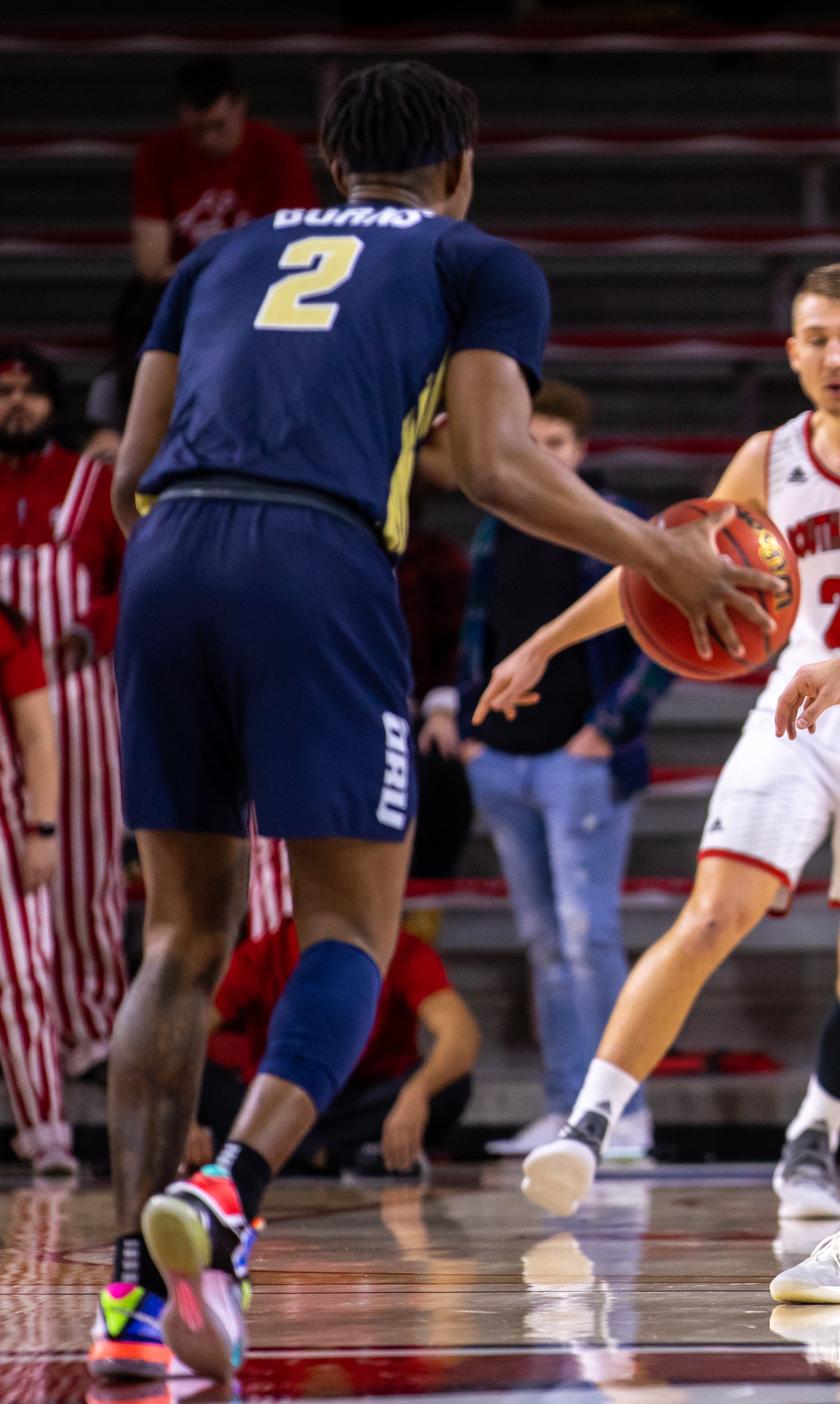
- Burns with Oral Roberts in January 2020

No. 2 – Keravnos
- Position: Point guard
- League: Cyprus Basketball Division A

Personal information
- Born: January 16, 1997 (age 29) Jackson, Mississippi, U.S.
- Listed height: 6 ft 3 in (1.91 m)
- Listed weight: 190 lb (86 kg)

Career information
- High school: Newman Smith (Carrolton, Texas)
- College: Little Rock (2015–2019); Oral Roberts (2019–2020)
- NBA draft: 2020: undrafted
- Playing career: 2020–present

Career history
- 2020–2021: Starwings Basel
- 2021: Metroplex Lightning
- 2021–2023: Keravnos
- 2023: BG Göttingen
- 2023–2024: Hapoel Holon
- 2024–2025: ESSM Le Portel
- 2025–2026: Prishtina
- 2026–present: Keravnos

Career highlights
- Cypriot League champion (2022); Cypriot Cup winner (2022); Cypriot Super Cup winner (2021); Cypriot League All-Star (2022); Second-team All-Summit League (2020)

Deondre Burns (born January 16, 1997) is an American professional basketball player for Keravnos of the Cyprus Basketball Division A. He played college basketball for the Little Rock Trojans and the Oral Roberts Golden Eagles.

== Early life ==
His hometown is Yazoo City, Mississippi, and his parents are Deon Burns and Belinda Smith. He has a sister, DeCarnia Smith.

== High school career ==
Burns played for Newman Smith High School under coach Percy Johnson. In February 2015, Burns scored 30 points in a win against Thomas Jefferson High School to help Newman Smith qualify for the playoffs. As a senior, he tied for first in scoring among Dallas-area Class 5A players with 23.9 points per game, as well as posting 4.4 rebounds and 2.1 assists per game, and was named All-Area Honorable Mention. Burns signed with Little Rock in May 2015.

== College career ==
As a sophomore at Little Rock, Burns averaged 7.0 points and 1.5 rebounds per game, shooting 45% from the field and 81% from the free throw line. Burns missed the 2017–18 season with a knee injury. He served as the team's sixth man during his redshirt junior season, with coach Darrell Walker saying, "I like bringing Dre' off the bench because he can score points off the bench." Burns averaged 10 points and 2.8 rebounds per game as a redshirt junior, shooting 42 percent from the field.

After the season, he opted to transfer to Oral Roberts as a graduate transfer. On January 13, 2020, Burns was named Summit League player of the week after posting 22 points against North Dakota State and 19 points against North Dakota. He scored a career-high 31 points on February 6, in a 74–68 loss to North Dakota. As a senior at Oral Roberts, Burns averaged 15.3 points, 4.1 rebounds, and 4.1 assists (2nd in the league) per game, shooting 46% from the field (8th) and 80% from the free throw line (4th). He was named to the Second Team All-Summit League.

== Professional career ==
On August 29, 2020, Burns signed his first professional contract with Starwings Basel of the Swiss Basketball League. He averaged 20.0 points (3rd in the league), 4.4 rebounds, 1.6 steals (7th), and 4.2 assists (9th) per game, shooting 82% from the free throw line.

He subsequently joined the Metroplex Lightning of the Pro Basketball Association. On September 8, 2021, Burns signed with Keravnos of the Cypriot League. In 2021-22 with the team, he averaged 20.8 points (6th in the league), 5.4 rebounds, 4.0 assists, and 1.2 steals per game, with a 47.2% three point percentage (3rd). In 2022-23 with the team, he averaged 14.7 points, 3.5 rebounds, 3.7 assists, and 1.2 steals per game.

On July 19, 2023, he signed and then played with BG Göttingen of the Basketball Bundesliga. In December 2023 the club parted ways with Burns.

On December 26, 2023, he signed with Hapoel Holon of the Israeli Basketball Premier League.

On November 9, 2024, he signed with ESSM Le Portel of the LNB Pro A.

In 2025, Burns joined Prishtina of the Kosovan league, averaging 18.0 points, 3.3 rebounds, and 3.8 assists per game. On April 6, 2026, he signed with Keravnos of the Cyprus Basketball Division A.
