= Tyler Hagedorn =

American basketball player (born 1996)

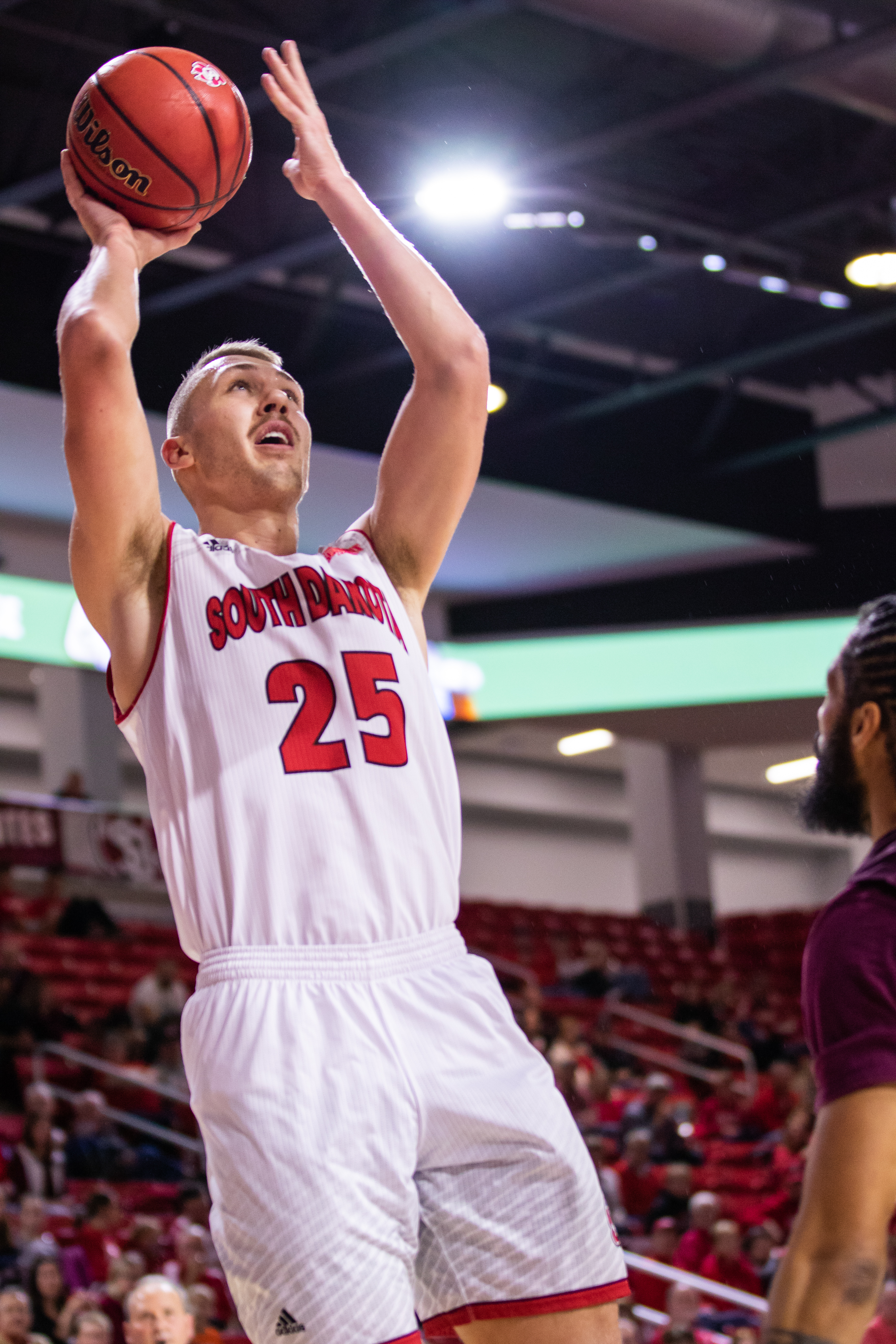
- Hagedorn with South Dakota in 2019

Free agent
- Position: Power forward

Personal information
- Born: June 11, 1996 (age 30)
- Listed height: 6 ft 10 in (2.08 m)
- Listed weight: 230 lb (104 kg)

Career information
- High school: Norfolk (Norfolk, Nebraska)
- College: South Dakota (2015–2020)
- NBA draft: 2020: undrafted
- Playing career: 2020–present

Career history
- 2020–2021: Budućnost
- 2020–2021: →Studentski centar
- 2021: College Park Skyhawks
- 2021–2022: Memphis Hustle
- 2022: Maine Celtics
- 2022: Sioux Falls Skyforce
- 2022–2023: Iowa Wolves
- 2023: Austin Spurs
- 2023: Long Island Nets

Career highlights
- ABA League Second Division champion (2021); First-team All-Summit League (2020); Second-team All-Summit League (2018)

Tyler Joseph Hagedorn (born June 11, 1996) is an American professional basketball player who last played for the Long Island Nets of the NBA G League. He played college basketball for South Dakota.

== Early life and high school career ==
In middle school, Hagedorn helped his team win a tournament in Sioux Falls, South Dakota, the moment he said he fell in love with basketball. Hagedorn attended Norfolk High School in Norfolk, Nebraska. He grew to 6'6 as a freshman and was a three-year starter on the basketball team. Hagedorn was named to the Third Team All-Nebraska as a junior, helping the team finish 21–7 and reach the Class A semifinal. As a senior, he averaged 17.4 points, 6.6 rebounds and 2.5 assists per game. Hagedorn helped Norfolk finish 25–1 and reach the Class A state quarterfinals. He was named Nebraska player of the year. Hagedorn graduated as the Panthers' all-time leader in games played, rebounds and blocked shots. He committed to play at South Dakota over offers from Omaha and several other Summit League programs.

== College career ==
Hagedorn came off the bench during his first two seasons at South Dakota. As a sophomore, he averaged 5.1 points and 2.6 rebounds per game, helping the team reach the NIT. Hagedorn averaged 13 points and 5.9 rebounds per game as a junior, earning Second Team All-Summit League honors. Shortly before the start of his senior season, he suffered a plantar fascia injury, forcing him to miss the season and redshirt. On November 15, 2019, Hagedorn scored a career-high 33 points on 12 of 17 shooting and collected eight rebounds in a 88–69 win over Texas Southern. He posted 31 points, nine rebounds and two blocks on January 25, 2020, in a 91–80 win against Oral Roberts. As a redshirt senior, Hagedorn averaged 18.1 points and 6.9 rebounds per game, shooting 54 percent from the floor, 51 percent from three-point range and 82 percent from the foul line. A first team All-Summit League honoree, Hagedorn was just short of qualifying for the Division I lead in three-point percentage.

== Professional career ==
=== Budućnost (2020–2021) ===
On August 25, 2020, Hagedorn signed his first professional contract with Budućnost of the Montenegrin Basketball League. He was subsequently loaned to Studentski centar. Hagedorn averaged 6.5 points, 4.3 rebounds and 1.8 assists per game in Montenegro.

=== College Park Skyhawks (2021) ===
Hagedorn joined the Los Angeles Lakers for the 2021 NBA Summer League.

Hagedorn was selected second overall in the 2021 NBA G League draft by the College Park Skyhawks. On December 13, he was waived after only appearing in one game.

=== Memphis Hustle (2021–2022) ===
On December 19, 2021, Hagedorn was claimed off waivers by the Memphis Hustle. On February 6, 2022, he was waived.

Hagedorn was added to the Raptors 905 roster on February 8, 2022, as a replacement player due to a COVID-19 outbreak on the team. He was waived two days later without playing a game for the team.

=== Maine Celtics (2022) ===
On March 2, 2022, Hagedorn was acquired by the Maine Celtics from the available player pool.

=== Sioux Falls Skyforce (2022) ===
On October 24, 2022, Hagedorn joined the Santa Cruz Warriors training camp roster. However, he did not make the final roster. On November 16, Hagedorn joined the Sioux Falls Skyforce, but was waived on December 8 after seven appearances.

=== Iowa Wolves (2022–2023) ===
On December 13, 2022, Hagedorn signed a contract to join the Iowa Wolves. On January 14, 2023, Hagedorn was waived.

=== Austin Spurs (2023) ===
On February 4, 2023, Hagedorn was acquired by the Austin Spurs. He was waived two days later.

=== Long Island Nets (2023) ===
On February 13, 2023, Hagedorn was acquired by the Long Island Nets. However, he was waived on February 27.

== Personal life ==
Hagedorn is the son of Randy and Patti Hagedorn. His father works as a basketball referee and executive director of the Norfolk YMCA. Hagedorn has a younger brother Matt and an older sister Breanna, who played basketball at Doane University. He is a member of the Nathional Honor Society and has volunteered for his church and Mercy Meals of America.
