= Denver Pioneers men's basketball statistical leaders =

The Denver Pioneers men's basketball statistical leaders are individual statistical leaders of the Denver Pioneers men's basketball program in various categories, including points, rebounds, assists, steals, and blocks. Within those areas, the lists identify single-game, single-season, and career leaders. The Pioneers represent the University of Denver in the NCAA Division I West Coast Conference.

Denver began competing in intercollegiate basketball in 1903. However, the school's record book does not generally list records from before the 1950s, as records from before this period are often incomplete and inconsistent. Since scoring was much lower in this era, and teams played much fewer games during a typical season, it is likely that few or no players from this era would appear on these lists anyway.

The NCAA did not officially record assists as a stat until the 1983–84 season, and blocks and steals until the 1985–86 season, but Denver's record books includes players in these stats before these seasons. These lists are updated through the end of the 2020–21 season.

== Scoring ==
Career
Rk	Player	Points	Seasons
1	Harry Hollines	1,879	1965–66 1966–67 1967–68
2	Doug Price	1,830	1992–93 1993–94 1994–95 1995–96 1996–97
3	B.J. Pratt	1,705	1999–00 2000–01 2001–02 2002–03
4	Joe Rosga	1,621	2015–16 2016–17 2017–18 2018–19
5	Brian Stafford	1,586	2008–09 2009–10 2010–11 2011–12
6	Chris Udofia	1,501	2010–11 2011–12 2012–13 2013–14
7	Brett Olson	1,468	2011–12 2012–13 2013–14 2014–15
8	Peter Faller	1,417	1984–85 1985–86 1986–87 1987–88
9	Wahhab Carter	1,382	1998–99 1999–00 2000–01 2001–02
10	Jack Hauser	1,375	1945–46 1946–47 1947–48 1948–49

Season
Rk	Player	Points	Season
1	Tommy Bruner	816	2023–24
2	Matt Teahan	659	1978–79
3	Carson Johnson	642	2025–26
4	Harry Hollines	632	1965–66
5	Alonzo Weatherly	630	1979–80
6	Mark Langkamp	627	1983–84
7	Harry Hollines	626	1967–68
8	Vince Boryla	624	1948–49
9	Harry Hollines	621	1966–67
10	Yemi Nicholson	616	2005–06

Single game
Rk	Player	Points	Season	Opponent
1	Matt Teahan	61	1978–79	Nebraska Wesleyan
2	Dan Cramer	50	1973–74	Southern Mississippi
3	Tommy Bruner	49	2023–24	South Dakota
4	Lawrence Toburen	48	1956–57	Evansville
5	Scott Williams	44	1989–90	Nebraska-Kearney
6	Scott Williams	42	1989–90	Northern Colorado
7	Dave Bustion	41	1971–72	Houston
	Jerry Cole	41	1959–60	New Mexico
	Harry Hollines	41	1966–67	Air Force
	Tommy Bruner	41	2023–24	North Dakota State

== Rebounds ==
Career
Rk	Player	Rebounds	Seasons
1	Dick Brott	1,067	1954–55 1955–56 1956–57
2	Brett Starkey	751	2000–01 2001–02 2002–03 2003–04
3	Yemi Nicholson	707	2003–04 2004–05 2005–06
4	Doug Price	703	1992–93 1993–94 1994–95 1995–96 1996–97
	Eric Dow	703	1995–96 1996–97 1997–98 1998–99
6	Jim Peay	656	1957–58 1958–59 1959–60
7	Dave Bustion	651	1970–71 1971–72
8	Touko Tainamo	631	2021–22 2022–23 2023–24
9	Dwayne Russell	629	1979–80 1980–81 1981–82
10	Wahhab Carter	626	1998–99 1999–00 2000–01 2001–02

Season
Rk	Player	Rebounds	Season
1	Dick Brott	425	1956–57
2	Dick Brott	346	1954–55
3	Yemi Nicholson	339	2005–06
4	Dave Bustion	336	1971–72
5	Jim Peay	332	1959–60
6	John Johnson	326	1972–73
7	Dave Bustion	315	1970–71
8	Brett Starkey	311	2002–03
9	Jim Peay	304	1957–58
10	Byron Beck	295	1965–66

Single game
Rk	Player	Rebounds	Season	Opponent
1	Dick Brott	38	1956–57	Evansville
2	Dick Brott	29	1956–57	Southern California
3	Dick Brott	28	1956–57	Utah State
4	Dave Bustion	27	1971–72	Regis
	Jim Peay	27	1958–59	Northern Colorado
6	Jim Peay	26	1959–60	Hawaii
7	George Walls	25	1974–75	Phillips
	Dave Bustion	25	1970–71	Western Michigan
9	John Johnson	24	1972–73	Corpus Christi
	Dick Brott	24	1956–57	New Mexico
	Dick Brott	24	1954–55	Utah State
	Dick Brott	24	1954–55	Brigham Young
	Dick Brott	24	1954–55	Utah State

== Assists ==
Career
Rk	Player	Assists	Seasons
1	Doug Wilson	560	1980–81 1981–82 1982–83 1983–84
2	Tom Jorgensen	468	1977–78 1978–79 1979–80
3	Peter Faller	455	1984–85 1985–86 1986–87 1987–88
4	Rodney Billups	418	2002–03 2003–04 2004–05
5	Mike Gallagher	382	1977–78 1978–79 1979–80 1980–81
6	Nate Rohnert	357	2006–07 2007–08 2008–09 2009–10
7	Chris Udofia	349	2010–11 2011–12 2012–13 2013–14
8	Brett Olson	336	2011–12 2012–13 2013–14 2014–15
9	Joe Rosga	312	2015–16 2016–17 2017–18 2018–19
10	Jake Pemberton	308	2014–15 2015–16 2016–17 2017–18

Season
Rk	Player	Assists	Season
1	Tom Jorgensen	224	1979–80
2	Tom Jorgensen	202	1978–79
3	Rodney Billups	199	2004–05
4	Mike Gallagher	199	1980–81
5	Doug Wilson	169	1983–84
6	Ty Church	166	1999–00
7	Doug Wilson	162	1981–82
8	Doug Wilson	158	1982–83
9	Steve Cribari	157	1975–76
10	Nate Rohnert	146	2008–09

Single game
Rk	Player	Assists	Season	Opponent
1	Tom Jorgensen	18	1978–79	Houston Baptist
2	Mike Gallagher	17	1980–81	Northern Montana
3	Mike Gallagher	16	1980–81	Doane
	Tom Jorgensen	16	1978–79	Oklahoma City
5	Rodney Billups	15	2004–05	Louisiana-Lafayette
	Tom Jorgensen	15	1978–79	Texas-Pan American
7	Tom Jorgensen	14	1978–79	Nebraska Wesleyan
	Jim Ranson	14	1976–77	Hardin-Simmons
9	Derrick Fuller	13	1991–92	Dordt
	Mike Gallagher	13	1980–81	Cornell (Iowa)
	Jake Pemberton	13	2016–17	Fort Wayne

== Steals ==
Career
Rk	Player	Steals	Seasons
1	Peter Faller	221	1984–85 1985–86 1986–87 1987–88
2	Chase Hallam	201	2009–10 2010–11 2011–12 2012–13
3	Doug Wilson	165	1980–81 1981–82 1982–83 1983–84
4	Erik Benzel	163	2001–02 2002–03 2003–04 2004–05
5	Rodney Billups	154	2002–03 2003–04 2004–05
6	Andre Guzman	142	1991–92 1992–93 1993–94 1994–95
7	Chris Udofia	141	2010–11 2011–12 2012–13 2013–14
	Cam Griffin	141	2011–12 2012–13 2013–14 2014–15
9	Tim Ray	129	1987–88 1988–89 1989–90 1990–91
10	Jake Pemberton	128	2014–15 2015–16 2016–17 2017–18

Season
Rk	Player	Steals	Season
1	Peter Faller	71	1987–88
	Mel Coffman	71	1980–81
3	Peter Faller	70	1986–87
4	Chase Hallam	67	2012–13
5	Xander McNally	66	2007–08
	Joe Fisher	66	1986–87
7	Andre Guzman	59	1993–94
8	Rodney Billups	58	2004–05
9	Josh Austin	54	1996–97
10	Chris Udofia	52	2012–13

Single game
Rk	Player	Steals	Season	Opponent
1	Chase Hallam	8	2012–13	Seattle
	Andre Guzman	8	1993–94	Wayne (Neb.) State
	Tim Ray	8	1990–91	Fort Lewis
	Joe Fisher	8	1986–87	Dordt
5	Royce O'Neale	7	2011–12	North Texas
	Xander McNally	7	2007–08	Louisiana-Lafayette
	Derrick Fuller	7	1990–92	Colorado College
	Peter Faller	7	1986–87	Black Hills State
	Greg Rhodes	7	1981–82	Colorado College
	Roy Jones	7	1978–79	Rhode Island
	Jim Coffman	7	1978–79	Drexel

== Blocks ==
Career
Rk	Player	Blocks	Seasons
1	Chris Udofia	256	2010–11 2011–12 2012–13 2013–14
2	Yemi Nicholson	210	2003–04 2004–05 2005–06
3	Dwayne Russell	130	1979–80 1980–81 1981–82
4	Ira Harge	128	1986–87 1987–88
5	Eric Dow	124	1995–96 1996–97 1997–98 1998–99
6	Adam McCanna	96	1993–94 1994–95 1995–96 1996–97 1997–98
7	Kelly Lively	93	1991–92 1992–93
8	Ricky Oliver	91	1985–86 1987–88 1988–89 1989–90
9	Alex Sund	90	1990–91 1991–92 1992–93
10	Isaiah Carr	76	2023–24 2024–25

Season
Rk	Player	Blocks	Season
1	Kelly Lively	93	1991–92
2	Yemi Nicholson	92	2004–05
3	Yemi Nicholson	88	2005–06
4	Chris Udofia	75	2012–13
5	Chris Udofia	72	2011–12
6	Chris Udofia	70	2013–14
7	Eric Dow	66	1998–99
8	Ira Harge	63	1986–87
9	Isaiah Carr	60	2023–24
10	Adam McCanna	53	1997–98

Single game
Rk	Player	Blocks	Season	Opponent
1	Yemi Nicholson	9	2004–05	New Orleans
	Isaiah Carr	9	2023–24	Colorado College
3	Yemi Nicholson	8	2005–06	Illinois-Chicago
	Adam McCanna	8	1997–98	Portland
5	Yemi Nicholson	7	2005–06	Western Kentucky
	Yemi Nicholson	7	2004–05	Arkansas State
	Yemi Nicholson	7	2004–05	Stanford
	Kelly Lively	7	1991–92	Regis
