= 2017–18 South Dakota Coyotes men's basketball team =

American college basketball season

2017–18 South Dakota Coyotes men's basketball

CBI, First round
- Conference: The Summit League
- Record: 26–9 (11–3 The Summit)
- Head coach: Craig Smith (4th season)
- Assistant coaches: Gameli Ahelegbe; Austin Hansen; Eric Peterson
- Home arena: Sanford Coyote Sports Center

2017–18 Summit League men's basketball standings
	Conf.				Overall
Team	W		L	PCT	W		L	PCT
South Dakota State †	13	–	1	.929	28	–	7	.800
South Dakota	11	–	3	.786	26	–	9	.743
Denver	8	–	6	.571	15	–	15	.500
Fort Wayne	7	–	7	.500	18	–	15	.545
North Dakota State	5	–	9	.357	15	–	17	.469
Oral Roberts	5	–	9	.357	11	–	21	.344
Omaha	4	–	10	.286	9	–	22	.290
Western Illinois	3	–	11	.214	12	–	16	.429
† 2018 Summit League Tournament winner

The 2017–18 South Dakota Coyotes men's basketball team represented the University of South Dakota during the 2017–18 NCAA Division I men's basketball season. The Coyotes, led by fourth-year head coach Craig Smith, played their home games at the Sanford Coyote Sports Center in Vermillion, South Dakota as members of the Summit League. They finished the season 26–9, 11–3 in Summit League play to finish in second place. They defeated Omaha and Denver to advance to the championship game of the Summit League where they lost to South Dakota State. They were invited to the College Basketball Invitational where they lost in the first round to North Texas.

On March 25, 2018, head coach Craig Smith was hired as the head coach at Utah State. On April 6, the school hired former Grand Canyon assistant and South Dakota alum Todd Lee as head coach.

== Previous season ==
The Coyotes finished the 2016–17 season 22–12, 12–4 in Summit League play to win the Summit League regular season championship. As the No. 1 seed in the Summit League tournament, they defeated Western Illinois in the quarterfinals before losing to South Dakota State in the semifinals. As a regular season conference champion who failed to win their conference tournament title, they received an automatic bid to the National Invitation Tournament where they lost in the first round to Iowa.

== Preseason ==
In a poll of league coaches, media, and sports information directors, the Coyotes were picked to finish in second place. Junior guard Matt Mooney was named to the preseason All-Summit First Team and junior forward Trey Burch-Manning was named to the Second Team.

== Roster ==
2017–18 South Dakota Coyotes men's basketball team
Players
Coaches

Pos.	#	Name	Height	Weight	Year	Hometown
G	0	Stanley Umude	6 ft 6 in (1.98 m)	195 lb (88 kg)	Fr	San Antonio, Texas
G	1	Jack Stensgard	6 ft 3 in (1.91 m)	180 lb (82 kg)	RS Fr	Inver Grove Heights, Minnesota
G	2	Carlton Hurst	6 ft 3 in (1.91 m)	195 lb (88 kg)	Sr	Denver, Colorado
G	3	Triston Simpson	6 ft 2 in (1.88 m)	190 lb (86 kg)	So	Lincoln, Nebraska
G	5	Joshua Doss	6 ft 4 in (1.93 m)	200 lb (91 kg)	Sr	Chicago, Illinois
G	11	Josh Williams	6 ft 1 in (1.85 m)	200 lb (91 kg)	Fr	Houston, Texas
F	12	Trey Burch-Manning	6 ft 6 in (1.98 m)	200 lb (91 kg)	Jr	Federal Way, Washington
G	13	Matt Mooney	6 ft 3 in (1.91 m)	210 lb (95 kg)	Jr	Wauconda, Illinois
G	20	Brandon Armstrong	6 ft 5 in (1.96 m)	205 lb (93 kg)	So	San Antonio, Texas
G	22	Tyler Peterson	6 ft 4 in (1.93 m)	210 lb (95 kg)	So	Lino Lakes, Minnesota
F	23	Walter Prevost	6 ft 8 in (2.03 m)	215 lb (98 kg)	Fr	Houston, Texas
G	24	Brady Delimont	6 ft 4 in (1.93 m)	185 lb (84 kg)	RS Fr	Ainsworth, Nebraska
F	25	Tyler Hagedorn	6 ft 10 in (2.08 m)	235 lb (107 kg)	Jr	Norfolk, Nebraska
F	31	Dan Jech	6 ft 9 in (2.06 m)	230 lb (104 kg)	Jr	Rochester, Minnesota
F	33	Logan Power	6 ft 6 in (1.98 m)	230 lb (104 kg)	Jr	Lincoln, Nebraska
F	34	Nick Fuller	6 ft 7 in (2.01 m)	215 lb (98 kg)	Sr	Sun Prairie, Wisconsin
F	45	Austin Sparks	6 ft 8 in (2.03 m)	240 lb (109 kg)	Sr	Denver, Colorado

Head coach

- Craig Smith (North Dakota)

Assistant coach(es)

- Gameli Ahelegbe (Minnesota State)
- Austin Hansen (South Dakota State)
- Eric Peterson (UW–La Crosse)

Legend

- (C) Team captain
- (S) Suspended
- (I) Ineligible
- (W) Walk-on
- Injured
- Current redshirt

Roster
Last update: 2017-09-13

== Schedule and results ==
Date time, TV	Rank^{#}	Opponent^{#}	Result	Record	Site (attendance) city, state
Exhibition
Nov 4, 2017*; 7:00 pm		Sioux Falls	W 73–64		Sanford Coyote Sports Center (1,588); Vermillion, SD
Regular season
Nov 11, 2017*; 6:00 pm		Mayville State	W 87–59	1–0	Sanford Coyote Sports Center (1,838); Vermillion, SD
Nov 13, 2017*; 6:00 pm, ESPN3		at Bowling Green	W 88–79	2–0	Stroh Center (1,237); Bowling Green, OH
Nov 15, 2017*; 8:00 pm, FSSW		at TCU	L 71–76	2–1	Schollmaier Arena (5,939); Fort Worth, TX
Nov 18, 2017*; 7:00 pm, MidcoSN/ESPN3		Grambling State	W 84–55	3–1	Sanford Coyote Sports Center (2,054); Vermillion, SD
Nov 20, 2017*; 7:00 pm		Mount Marty; Sanford Pentagon Showcase campus-site game	W 93–54	4–1	Sanford Coyote Sports Center (2,050); Vermillion, SD
Nov 24, 2017*; 5:30 pm		vs. Southern Miss; Sanford Pentagon Showcase	W 84–71	5–1	Sanford Pentagon (1,105); Sioux Falls, SD
Nov 25, 2017*; 6:30 pm		vs. Northern Colorado; Sanford Pentagon Showcase	L 62–63	5–2	Sanford Pentagon (1,248); Sioux Falls, SD
Nov 26, 2017*; 1:30 pm, FS North		vs. Youngstown State; Sanford Pentagon Showcase	W 81–53	6–2	Sanford Pentagon (467); Sioux Falls, SD
Nov 30, 2017*; 7:00 pm		at UMKC	W 82–63	7–2	Swinney Recreation Center (1,257); Kansas City, MO
Dec 2, 2017*; 2:30 pm, ESPN2		at No. 1 Duke	L 80–96	7–3	Cameron Indoor Stadium (9,314); Durham, NC
Dec 6, 2017*; 7:00 pm, MidcoSN/ESPN3		Drake	W 93–65	8–3	Sanford Coyote Sports Center (2,101); Vermillion, SD
Dec 10, 2017*; 1:00 pm, MidcoSN/ESPN3		Eastern Washington	W 75–73	9–3	Sanford Coyote Sports Center (1,998); Vermillion, SD
Dec 14, 2017*; 7:30 pm		at Northern Arizona	W 90–77	10–3	Walkup Skydome (256); Flagstaff, AZ
Dec 17, 2017*; 4:00 pm		at San Jose State	W 76–62	11–3	Event Center Arena (1,424); San Jose, CA
Dec 19, 2017*; 8:00 pm, P12N		at UCLA	L 82–85	11–4	Pauley Pavilion (5,767); Los Angeles, CA
Dec 21, 2017*; 7:30 pm		Northland College	W 88–42	12–4	Sanford Coyote Sports Center (1,774); Vermillion, SD
Dec 30, 2017; 3:30 pm, MidcoSN/ESPN3		Denver	W 82–71	13–4 (1–0)	Sanford Coyote Sports Center (2,334); Vermillion, SD
Jan 3, 2018; 7:00 pm		Western Illinois	W 62–50	14–4 (2–0)	Sanford Coyote Sports Center (1,776); Vermillion, SD
Jan 6, 2018; 1:00 pm, MidcoSN/ESPN3		North Dakota State	L 79–84	14–5 (2–1)	Sanford Coyote Sports Center (2,206); Vermillion, SD
Jan 11, 2018; 6:00 pm		at Fort Wayne	W 68–58	15–5 (3–1)	Memorial Coliseum (1,464); Fort Wayne, IN
Jan 17, 2018; 7:00 pm, MidcoSN/ESPN3		Oral Roberts	W 82–70	16–5 (4–1)	Sanford Coyote Sports Center (2,351); Vermillion, SD
Jan 20, 2018; 7:00 pm		at Omaha	W 85–71	17–5 (5–1)	Baxter Arena (3,070); Omaha, NE
Jan 24, 2018; 7:00 pm, MidcoSN/ESPN3		South Dakota State	W 87–68	18–5 (6–1)	Sanford Coyote Sports Center (5,004); Vermillion, SD
Jan 27, 2018; 5:00 pm, ALT2		at Denver	L 68–84	18–6 (6–2)	Magness Arena (432); Denver, CO
Feb 1, 2018; 7:00 pm, ESPN3		at Western Illinois	W 80–54	19–6 (7–2)	Western Hall (567); Macomb, IL
Feb 3, 2018; 2:00 pm, MidcoSN/ESPN3		at North Dakota State	W 76–72	20–6 (8–2)	Scheels Center (3,722); Fargo, ND
Feb 8, 2018; 7:00 pm		Fort Wayne	W 86–69	21–6 (9–2)	Sanford Coyote Sports Center (2,387); Vermillion, SD
Feb 11, 2018*; 1:00 pm		Peru State	W 98–55	22–6	Sanford Coyote Sports Center (1,961); Vermillion, SD
Feb 14, 2018; 7:00 pm		at Oral Roberts	W 85–67	23–6 (10–2)	Mabee Center (2,027); Tulsa, OK
Feb 17, 2018; 3:30 pm, MidcoSN/ESPN3		Omaha	W 79–64	24–6 (11–2)	Sanford Coyote Sports Center (2,864); Vermillion, SD
Feb 22, 2018; 7:00 pm, MidcoSN		at South Dakota State	W 76–72	24–7 (11–3)	Frost Arena (4,138); Brookings, SD
Summit League tournament
Mar 3, 2018; 8:30 pm, ESPN3	(2)	vs. (7) Omaha; Quarterfinals	W 87–73	25–7	Premier Center (10,771); Sioux Falls, SD
Mar 5, 2018; 8:30 pm, ESPN3	(2)	vs. (3) Denver; Semifinals	W 76–56	26–7	Premier Center (8,835); Sioux Falls, SD
Mar 6, 2018; 8:00 pm, ESPN2	(2)	vs. (1) South Dakota State; Championship Game	L 87–97	26–8	Premier Center (11,114); Sioux Falls, SD
CBI
Mar 14, 2018*; 7:00 pm		North Texas; First round	L 77–90	26–9	Sanford Coyote Sports Center (1,348); Vermillion, SD
*Non-conference game. ^{#}Rankings from AP Poll. (#) Tournament seedings in parentheses. All times are in Central Time.
