= 2017–18 Fort Wayne Mastodons men's basketball team =

American college basketball season

2017–18 Fort Wayne Mastodons men's basketball

CIT, First round
- Conference: Summit League
- Record: 18–15 (7–7 The Summit)
- Head coach: Jon Coffman (4th season)
- Assistant coaches: John Peckinpaugh (2nd season); Ryan Sims (7th season); Ben Botts (4th season)
- Home arena: Gates Sports Center; Allen County War Memorial Coliseum

2017–18 Summit League men's basketball standings
	Conf.				Overall
Team	W		L	PCT	W		L	PCT
South Dakota State †	13	–	1	.929	28	–	7	.800
South Dakota	11	–	3	.786	26	–	9	.743
Denver	8	–	6	.571	15	–	15	.500
Fort Wayne	7	–	7	.500	18	–	15	.545
North Dakota State	5	–	9	.357	15	–	17	.469
Oral Roberts	5	–	9	.357	11	–	21	.344
Omaha	4	–	10	.286	9	–	22	.290
Western Illinois	3	–	11	.214	12	–	16	.429
† 2018 Summit League Tournament winner

The 2017–18 Fort Wayne Mastodons men's basketball team represented Indiana University – Purdue University Fort Wayne during the 2017–18 NCAA Division I men's basketball season. The Mastodons were led by fourth-year head coach Jon Coffman and played their home games at the Gates Sports Center and the Allen County War Memorial Coliseum as members of the Summit League. They finished the season 18–15, 7–7 in Summit League play to finish in fourth place. On December 18, 2017, the Fort Wayne Mastodons traveled to Bloomington for a game with the state powerhouse Indiana Hoosiers. In a stunning upset they beat Indiana on their home court for the first time ever on national television. They lost in the quarterfinals of the Summit League tournament to North Dakota State. They were invited to the CollegeInsider.com Tournament where they lost in the first round to Central Michigan.

The season was the last in which the Mastodons represented IPFW. On July 1, 2018, IPFW will split into two separate institutions. The school's academic programs in health sciences will be governed solely by Indiana University under the banner of Indiana University Fort Wayne. All other academic programs will be governed solely by Purdue University as Purdue University Fort Wayne. The athletic program will continue to use its current branding as the Fort Wayne Mastodons, but will exclusively represent Purdue Fort Wayne, with the school colors changing to the old gold and black used by Purdue's main campus.

== Previous season ==
The Mastodons finished the 2016–17 season 20–13, 8–8 in Summit League play to finish in a three-way tie for fourth place. They lost in the quarterfinals of the Summit League tournament to Omaha. They were invited to the CollegeInsider.com Tournament where they defeated Ball State in the first round and received a second round bye before losing in the quarterfinals to Texas A&M–Corpus Christi.

== Preseason ==
In a poll of league coaches, media, and sports information directors, the Mastodons were picked to finish in fourth place. Junior guard John Konchar was named to the preseason All-Summit First Team and senior guard Bryson Scott was named to the Second Team.

== Roster ==
2017–18 Fort Wayne Mastodons men's basketball team
Players
Coaches

Pos.	#	Name	Height	Weight	Year	Previous school	Hometown
G	1	Bryson Scott	6 ft 1 in (1.85 m)	205 lb (93 kg)	RS Sr	Northrop; Purdue	Fort Wayne, IN
G	2	Chris Rollins	6 ft 0 in (1.83 m)	160 lb (73 kg)	RS Fr	East English Village Prep	Detroit, MI
F	5	Jax Levitch	6 ft 7 in (2.01 m)	210 lb (95 kg)	So	Trinity H.S. Elev8 Academy	Louisville, KY
G	11	Dylan Carl	6 ft 11 in (2.11 m)	205 lb (93 kg)	RS Fr	Alma H.S.	Alma, MI
F	13	Matt Holba	6 ft 7 in (2.01 m)	200 lb (91 kg)	Jr	Lehigh	Noblesville, IN
F	15	Jordan Coblin	6 ft 1 in (1.85 m)	175 lb (79 kg)	RS Fr	Grandview; Elev8 Academy	Boca Raton, FL
G	21	Jordon King	6 ft 4 in (1.93 m)	210 lb (95 kg)	Sr	Rainier Beach; North Idaho	Seattle, WA
F	22	Xzavier Taylor	6 ft 9 in (2.06 m)	255 lb (116 kg)	RS Sr	Morgan Park; Bradley	Chicago, IL
G	32	Kason Harrell	6 ft 2 in (1.88 m)	192 lb (87 kg)	Jr	Hempfield	Pittsburgh, PA
G	33	Matt Weir	6 ft 1 in (1.85 m)	175 lb (79 kg)	Fr	John Glenn; US Air Force Prep Academy	New Concord, OH
F	34	Cameron Benford	6 ft 8 in (2.03 m)	225 lb (102 kg)	Fr	Franklin; Hillcrest Academy	Seattle, WA
G	35	Jairus Stevens	6 ft 5 in (1.96 m)	195 lb (88 kg)	Fr	Merrillville; Cheshire Academy	Merrillville, IN
G	41	Marcus DeBerry	6 ft 5 in (1.96 m)	165 lb (75 kg)	Jr	Union City; Northern Arizona	Union City, TN
G	55	John Konchar	6 ft 5 in (1.96 m)	207 lb (94 kg)	RS Jr	West Chicago	West Chicago, IL

Head coach

- Jon Coffman (Washington and Lee)

Assistant coach(es)

- Mark Downey (Charleston (WV))
- Ryan Sims (Indianapolis)
- Ben Botts (Purdue Fort Wayne)

Legend

- (C) Team captain
- (S) Suspended
- (I) Ineligible
- (W) Walk-on
- Injured
- Current redshirt

Roster
Last update: 10/12/2017

== Schedule and results ==
Date time, TV	Rank^{#}	Opponent^{#}	Result	Record	High points	High rebounds	High assists	Site (attendance) city, state
Non-conference regular season
Nov 10, 2017*; 7:00 pm, ESPN3		at Oakland	L 71–85	0–1	31 – Scott	10 – Konchar	6 – Konchar	Athletics Center O'rena (3,579); Rochester, MI
Nov 12, 2017*; 4:40 pm		Defiance	W 114–59	1–1	21 – Scott	8 – Konchar	7 – Scott	Hilliard Gates Sports Center (1,316); Fort Wayne, IN
Nov 15, 2017*; 7:00 pm, CN81		Delaware State; Adolph Rupp Classic	W 85–71	2–1	20 – Harrell	12 – Konchar	5 – Weir	Memorial Coliseum (1,353); Fort Wayne, IN
Nov 18, 2017*; 4:00 pm, ESPN3		at UIC; Adolph Rupp Classic	W 67–51	3–1	19 – Scott	16 – Konchar	4 – Scott	UIC Pavilion (1,947); Chicago, IL
Nov 22, 2017*; 8:00 pm, SECN		at No. 8 Kentucky; Adolph Rupp Classic	L 67–86	3–2	19 – Konchar	6 – Konchar	6 – Konchar	Rupp Arena (20,645); Lexington, KY
Nov 25, 2017*; 8:00 pm, ESPN3		at East Tennessee State; Adolph Rupp Classic	L 73–83	3–3	24 – Scott	7 – Konchar	5 – Weir	Freedom Hall Civic Center (2,919); Johnson City, TN
Nov 28, 2017*; 7:00 pm, CN81		Detroit	W 91–82	4–3	34 – Scott	13 – Konchar	5 – Scott	Memorial Coliseum (1,357); Fort Wayne, IN
Nov 30, 2017*; 7:00 pm, CN81		Indiana Kokomo	W 99–63	5–3	17 – King	8 – Stevens	3 – Tied	Memorial Coliseum (1,371); Fort Wayne, IN
Dec 3, 2017*; 2:00 pm, CN81		SIU Edwardsville	W 86–71	6–3	31 – Scott	10 – Konchar	5 – Weir	Memorial Coliseum (1,315); Fort Wayne, IN
Dec 6, 2017*; 7:00 pm, ESPN3		at Akron	L 79–83	6–4	23 – Konchar	7 – Konchar	4 – Tied	James A. Rhodes Arena (2,340); Akron, OH
Dec 9, 2017*; 1:00 pm, ESPN3		at Miami (OH)	L 73–81	6–5	13 – Tied	8 – Taylor	5 – Konchar	Millett Hall (811); Oxford, OH
Dec 16, 2017*; 2:00 pm, CN81		Stetson	W 88–84	7–5	34 – Scott	12 – Levitch	2 – Tied	Memorial Coliseum (1,237); Fort Wayne, IN
Dec 18, 2017*; 8:00 pm, BTN		at Indiana	W 92–72	8–5	28 – Harrell	7 – Konchar	7 – Konchar	Simon Skjodt Assembly Hall (17,222); Bloomington, IN
Dec 21, 2017*; 11:00 am		vs. Liberty; New Orleans Classic semifinals	W 75–64	9–5	17 – Harrell	6 – Tied	7 – Konchar	Xavier University Convocation Center (300); New Orleans, LA
Dec 22, 2017*; 3:30 pm		vs. Louisiana Tech; New Orleans Classic championship	L 76–85	9–6	27 – Scott	6 – Konchar	6 – Konchar	Xavier University Convocation Center (250); New Orleans, LA
Dec 28, 2017*; 7:00 pm		Olivet	W 99–93	10–6	31 – Scott	6 – Tied	6 – Tied	Hilliard Gates Sports Center (919); Fort Wayne, IN
Dec 30, 2017*; 4:30 pm		Concordia (MI)	W 92–59	11–6	18 – Scott	12 – Taylor	7 – Scott	Hilliard Gates Sports Center (1,003); Fort Wayne, IN
Summit League regular season
Jan 4, 2018; 8:00 pm		at Oral Roberts	L 60–76	11–7 (0–1)	20 – Scott	9 – Konchar	3 – 3 tied	Mabee Center (2,219); Tulsa, OK
Jan 6, 2018; 3:00 pm		at Denver	W 82–63	12–7 (1–1)	20 – Scott	9 – Konchar	4 – Tied	Magness Arena (1,570); Denver, CO
Jan 11, 2018; 7:00 pm, CN81		South Dakota	L 58–68	12–8 (1–2)	26 – Scott	11 – Konchar	4 – Konchar	Memorial Coliseum (1,464); Fort Wayne, IN
Jan 13, 2018; 7:00 pm, CN81		Omaha	W 82–78	13–8 (2–2)	26 – Scott	13 – Konchar	9 – Konchar	Memorial Coliseum (1,590); Fort Wayne, IN
Jan 17, 2018; 8:00 pm		at Western Illinois	L 74–75 ^{OT}	13–9 (2–3)	17 – Scott	7 – Tied	4 – Tied	Western Hall (482); Macomb, IL
Jan 20, 2018; 1:00 pm, CN81		North Dakota State	W 92–88	14–9 (3–3)	31 – Scott	7 – Harrell	4 – Konchar	Memorial Coliseum (2,036); Fort Wayne, IN
Jan 27, 2018; 1:00 pm, Midco		at South Dakota State	L 76–78	14–10 (3–4)	23 – Konchar	9 – Tied	4 – Konchar	Frost Arena (3,536); Brookings, SD
Feb 1, 2018; 7:00 pm, CN81		Oral Roberts	W 85–75	15–10 (4–4)	23 – Scott	8 – Levitch	7 – Konchar	Memorial Coliseum (1,481); Fort Wayne, IN
Feb 3, 2018; 2:00 pm, CN81		Denver	W 91–63	16–10 (5–4)	25 – Scott	8 – Konchar	6 – Konchar	Memorial Coliseum (2,010); Fort Wayne, IN
Feb 8, 2018; 8:00 pm		at South Dakota	L 69–86	16–11 (5–5)	23 – Scott	12 – Konchar	2 – Tied	Sanford Coyote Sports Center (2,387); Vermillion, SD
Feb 10, 2018; 8:00 pm		at Omaha	L 85–90	16–12 (5–6)	22 – Konchar	7 – Konchar	6 – Konchar	Baxter Arena (4,106); Omaha, NE
Feb 14, 2018; 7:00 pm		Western Illinois	W 90–74	17–12 (6–6)	20 – Harrell	9 – Taylor	6 – Konchar	Hilliard Gates Sports Center (948); Fort Wayne, IN
Feb 17, 2018; 3:00 pm, Midco		at North Dakota State	W 84–72	18–12 (7–6)	24 – Harrell	8 – Konchar	8 – Konchar	Scheels Center (3,348); Fargo, ND
Feb 24, 2018; 7:00 pm		at South Dakota State	L 90–97	18–13 (7–7)	31 – Konchar	9 – Taylor	6 – Konchar	Hilliard Gates Sports Center (1,824); Fort Wayne, IN
Summit League tournament
Mar 4, 2018; 7:00 pm, ESPN3	(4)	vs. (5) North Dakota State	L 82–86	18–14	29 – Konchar	12 – Konchar	6 – Konchar	Denny Sanford Premier Center (5,692); Sioux Falls, SD
CIT
Mar 12, 2018*; 12:00 pm, CBSSN		vs. Central Michigan; First Round – Hugh Durham Classic	L 89–94	18–15	28 – Scott	7 – Konchar	5 – Tied	Memorial Coliseum (1,234); Fort Wayne, IN
*Non-conference game. ^{#}Rankings from AP Poll. (#) Tournament seedings in parentheses. All times are in Eastern Time.
