= 2017–18 Indiana Hoosiers men's basketball team =

American college basketball season

2017–18 Indiana Hoosiers men's basketball
- Conference: Big Ten Conference
- Record: 16–15 (9–9 Big Ten)
- Head coach: Archie Miller (1st season)
- Assistant coaches: Tom Ostrom (1st season); Ed Schilling (1st season); Bruiser Flint (1st season)
- Home arena: Simon Skjodt Assembly Hall

2017–18 Big Ten Conference men's basketball standings
	Conf.				Overall
Team	W		L	PCT	W		L	PCT
No. 5 Michigan State	16	–	2	.889	30	–	5	.857
No. 11 Purdue	15	–	3	.833	30	–	7	.811
No. 17 Ohio State	15	–	3	.833	25	–	9	.735
No. 7 Michigan †	13	–	5	.722	33	–	8	.805
Nebraska	13	–	5	.722	22	–	11	.667
Penn State	9	–	9	.500	26	–	13	.667
Indiana	9	–	9	.500	16	–	15	.516
Maryland	8	–	10	.444	19	–	13	.594
Wisconsin	7	–	11	.389	15	–	18	.455
Northwestern	6	–	12	.333	15	–	17	.469
Minnesota	4	–	14	.222	15	–	17	.469
Illinois	4	–	14	.222	14	–	18	.438
Iowa	4	–	14	.222	14	–	19	.424
Rutgers	3	–	15	.167	15	–	19	.441
† 2018 Big Ten tournament winner Rankings from AP poll

The 2017–18 Indiana Hoosiers men's basketball team represented Indiana University in the 2017–18 NCAA Division I men's basketball season. Their head coach was Archie Miller, in his first year as Indiana head coach. The team played its home games at Simon Skjodt Assembly Hall in Bloomington, Indiana, as a member of the Big Ten Conference. The season officially kicked off with its annual event, Hoosier Hysteria, on October 21, 2017.

For Miller, his first season at IU was not so much of a rebuilding job, as a major remodeling job, starting with laying the foundation of a pack-line defense and valuing possessions. Early in the season, Miller stated that practices were 75% defense, 25% offense. That scheme showed early and often, as the Hoosiers struggled mightily throughout the season to find any flow or rhythm on offense, despite the defense making leaps and bounds in the overall rankings of Division 1 basketball (final ranking of number one in the Big Ten Conference). As the season progressed toward its end, the Hoosiers bought into Miller's defense, which led to better offense. With a surprising early second round loss in the 2018 Big Ten tournament to Rutgers, 76–67, and losing enough games to keep them out of the NCAA tournament and NIT, including an early few they should have won against Indiana State and IPFW, IU's first season under their new coach came to a disappointing close. They finished with an overall record of 16–15 and 9–9 in the Big Ten.

== Previous season ==
Despite the highs of the previous season and being ranked as high as No. 3 in the nation, the Hoosiers faced a troubling and disappointing year; they finished the 2016–17 season 18–16, 7–11 in Big Ten play to finish in a tie for 10th place. At the Big Ten tournament they defeated Iowa in the second round to advance to the quarterfinals, where they lost to Wisconsin. The Hoosiers missed out on the NCAA tournament and lost in the first round of the NIT, their first appearance since 2005, to Georgia Tech. The game was played at Georgia Tech's McCamish Pavilion because Indiana Athletic Director Fred Glass declined to host a home game at Simon Skjodt Assembly Hall citing concern it would "devalue" the Hoosiers' home court.

On March 16, 2017, Indiana fired Crean after nine years as head coach. On March 25, 2017, it was announced that Dayton's Archie Miller was hired as Indiana's 29th head basketball coach. Miller played at NC State and had assistant coaching experience at schools like NC State, Ohio State, and Arizona before coaching Dayton for six years.

== Preseason ==
=== Departures ===
Indiana departures
Name	Number	Pos.	Height	Weight	Year	Hometown	Reason for departure
James Blackmon Jr.	1	G	6'4"	200	Junior	Marion, Indiana	Declared for 2017 NBA draft
OG Anunoby	3	F	6'8"	235	Sophomore	Jefferson City, Missouri	Declared for 2017 NBA draft
Thomas Bryant	31	C	6'10"	255	Sophomore	Rochester, New York	Declared for 2017 NBA draft
Grant Gelon	24	G	6'5"	195	Freshman	Crown Point, Indiana	Transferred to Missouri State University

=== Recruiting class ===
When IU changed head coaches, each of the three original recruits had to be re-recruited by IU's new head coach, Archie Miller. Eventually, all three recruits who had been brought on board by former head coach Tom Crean recommitted. On July 16, 2017, Miller was able to land his first IU recruit in freshman Race Thompson. Announced in interviews, Thompson reclassified from the class of 2018 to 2017 and decided to redshirt his freshman year.

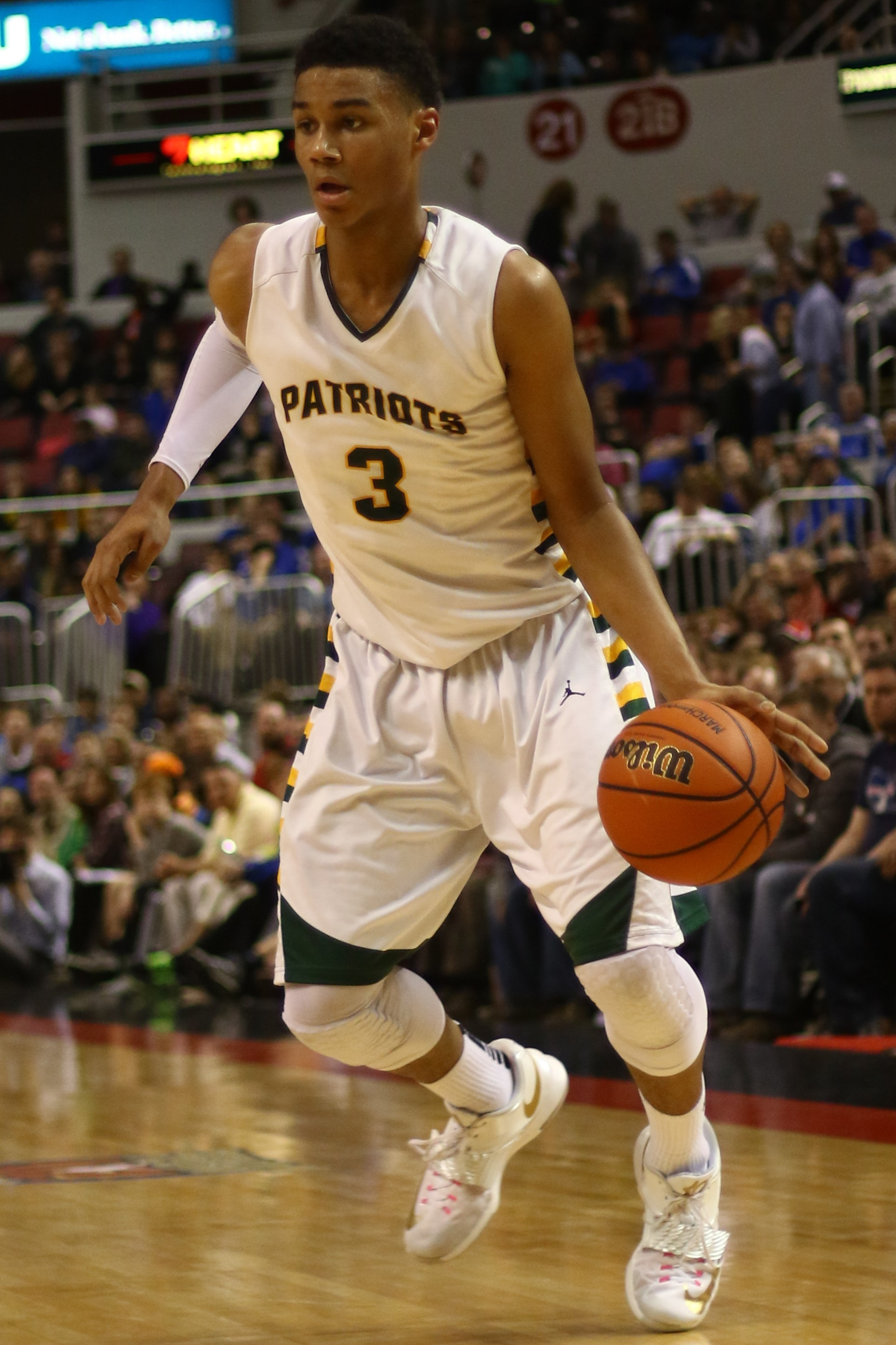
Justin Smith for Stevenson High School in 2015

College recruiting
Name	Hometown	School	Height	Weight	Commit date
Justin Smith; SF	Buffalo Grove, IL	Stevenson High School	6 ft 7 in (2.01 m)	210 lb (95 kg)	Sep 26, 2016
Justin Smith; SF	Recruit ratings: Scout: Rivals: 247Sports: ESPN: (83)				
Al Durham; PG	Lilburn, GA	Berkmar High School	6 ft 4 in (1.93 m)	175 lb (79 kg)	Apr 6, 2017
Al Durham; PG	Recruit ratings: Scout: Rivals: 247Sports: ESPN: (80)				
Clifton Moore; F	Ambler, PA	Hatboro-Horsham High School	6 ft 10 in (2.08 m)	200 lb (91 kg)	Apr 16, 2017
Clifton Moore; F	Recruit ratings: Scout: Rivals: 247Sports: ESPN: (74)				
Race Thompson; F	Plymouth, MN	Armstrong High School	6 ft 8 in (2.03 m)	215 lb (98 kg)	Jul 16, 2017
Race Thompson; F	Recruit ratings: Scout: Rivals: 247Sports: ESPN: (80)				
Overall recruit ranking:
Note: In many cases, Scout, Rivals, 247Sports, On3, and ESPN may conflict in their listings of height and weight.; In these cases, the average was taken. ESPN grades are on a 100-point scale.; Sources: "2017 Indiana Commits". Rivals.; "2017 Team Ranking". Rivals.

== Future recruits ==
=== 2018–19 team recruits ===
College recruiting
Name	Hometown	School	Height	Weight	Commit date
Jerome Hunter; SF	Pickerington, OH	Pickerington High School North	6 ft 7 in (2.01 m)	195 lb (88 kg)	Jul 17, 2017
Jerome Hunter; SF	Recruit ratings: Scout: Rivals: 247Sports: ESPN: (84)				
Damezi Anderson; SF	South Bend, IN	Riley High School	6 ft 6 in (1.98 m)	185 lb (84 kg)	Jul 17, 2017
Damezi Anderson; SF	Recruit ratings: Scout: Rivals: 247Sports: ESPN: (82)				
Rob Phinisee; PG	Lafayette, IN	McCutcheon High School	5 ft 11 in (1.80 m)	160 lb (73 kg)	Aug 19, 2017
Rob Phinisee; PG	Recruit ratings: Scout: Rivals: 247Sports: ESPN: (81)				
Jake Forrester; PF	Harrisburg, PA	Westtown School	6 ft 9 in (2.06 m)	215 lb (98 kg)	Sep 11, 2017
Jake Forrester; PF	Recruit ratings: Scout: Rivals: 247Sports: ESPN: (81)				
Romeo Langford; SG	New Albany, IN	New Albany High School	6 ft 6 in (1.98 m)	195 lb (88 kg)	Apr 30, 2018
Romeo Langford; SG	Recruit ratings: Scout: Rivals: 247Sports: ESPN: (94)				
Overall recruit ranking:
Note: In many cases, Scout, Rivals, 247Sports, On3, and ESPN may conflict in their listings of height and weight.; In these cases, the average was taken. ESPN grades are on a 100-point scale.; Sources: "2018 Indiana Commits". Rivals.; "2018 Team Ranking". Rivals.

== Roster ==
2017–18 Indiana Hoosiers men's basketball team
Players
Coaches

Pos.	#	Name	Height	Weight	Year	Previous school	Hometown
G	1	Al Durham	6 ft 4 in (1.93 m)	175 lb (79 kg)	Fr	Berkmar	Lilburn, Georgia
G	2	Josh Newkirk	6 ft 1 in (1.85 m)	195 lb (88 kg)	RS Sr	Word of God Christian Academy / Pittsburgh	Raleigh, North Carolina
F	3	Justin Smith	6 ft 7 in (2.01 m)	220 lb (100 kg)	Fr	Stevenson	Buffalo Grove, Illinois
G	4	Robert Johnson	6 ft 3 in (1.91 m)	195 lb (88 kg)	Sr	Benedictine	Richmond, Virginia
G	5	Quentin Taylor (W)	6 ft 2 in (1.88 m)	187 lb (85 kg)	Jr	Brebeuf	Indianapolis, Indiana
G	10	Johnny Jager (W)	6 ft 0 in (1.83 m)	185 lb (84 kg)	Jr	Bloomington South	Bloomington, Indiana
G	11	Devonte Green	6 ft 3 in (1.91 m)	186 lb (84 kg)	So	Long Island Lutheran	North Babylon, New York
G	12	Ethan Lasko (W)	6 ft 2 in (1.88 m)	171 lb (78 kg)	Fr	Weinbaum Yeshiva	Hollywood, Florida
F	13	Juwan Morgan	6 ft 8 in (2.03 m)	230 lb (104 kg)	Jr	Waynesville	Waynesville, Missouri
F	15	Zach McRoberts (W)	6 ft 6 in (1.98 m)	205 lb (93 kg)	RS Jr	Carmel/Vermont	Carmel, Indiana
F	20	De'Ron Davis	6 ft 10 in (2.08 m)	250 lb (113 kg)	So	Overland	Aurora, Colorado
F	21	Freddie McSwain Jr.	6 ft 6 in (1.98 m)	220 lb (100 kg)	Sr	Liberty County/Neosho County CC	Hinesville, Georgia
F	22	Clifton Moore	6 ft 10 in (2.08 m)	200 lb (91 kg)	Fr	Hatboro-Horsham	Horsham, Pennsylvania
G	24	Vijay Blackmon (W)	6 ft 2 in (1.88 m)	175 lb (79 kg)	So	Marion	Fort Wayne, Indiana
F	25	Race Thompson (redshirt)	6 ft 8 in (2.03 m)	200 lb (91 kg)	RS Fr	Armstrong	Plymouth, Minnesota
F	30	Collin Hartman (C)	6 ft 7 in (2.01 m)	220 lb (100 kg)	RS Sr	Cathedral	Indianapolis, Indiana
C	35	Tim Priller	6 ft 9 in (2.06 m)	225 lb (102 kg)	Sr	Richland	North Richland Hills, Texas

Head coach

- Archie Miller

Assistant coach(es)

- Tom Ostrom
- Ed Schilling
- Bruiser Flint

Legend

- (C) Team captain
- (S) Suspended
- (I) Ineligible
- (W) Walk-on
- Injured
- Current redshirt

Roster
Last update: 8-20-2017

== Schedule and results ==
Date time, TV	Rank^{#}	Opponent^{#}	Result	Record	High points	High rebounds	High assists	Site (attendance) city, state
Exhibition
Oct 28, 2017*; 8:00 pm, BTN+		Marian	W 93–62		22 – Green	6 – Green	7 – Green	Simon Skjodt Assembly Hall (17,222); Bloomington, IN
Nov 5*; 2:00 pm, BTN+		Indianapolis	W 74–53		18 – Johnson	9 – McSwain	3 – Newkirk	Simon Skjodt Assembly Hall (17,222); Bloomington, IN
Regular season
Nov 10*; 7:00 pm, BTN+		Indiana State	L 69–90	0–1	14 – Davis	8 – McSwain	3 – Green	Simon Skjodt Assembly Hall (17,222); Bloomington, IN
Nov 12*; 8:00 pm, BTN		Howard; Hoosier Tip-Off Classic	W 86–77	1–1	17 – Davis	12 – Smith	7 – Newkirk	Simon Skjodt Assembly Hall (17,222); Bloomington, IN
Nov 15*; 6:30 pm, FS1		at No. 22 Seton Hall; Gavitt Tipoff Games	L 68–84	1–2	16 – Green	7 – Morgan	3 – Tied	Prudential Center (8,452); Newark, NJ
Nov 19*; 6:00 pm, BTN		South Florida; Hoosier Tip-Off Classic	W 70–53	2–2	21 – Johnson	10 – Morgan	4 – Durham	Simon Skjodt Assembly Hall (17,222); Bloomington, IN
Nov 22*; 7:00 pm, BTN		Arkansas State; Hoosier Tip-Off Classic	W 87–70	3–2	28 – Morgan	10 – McSwain	3 – Durham	Simon Skjodt Assembly Hall (12,646); Bloomington, IN
Nov 24*; 4:30 pm, BTN		Eastern Michigan; Hoosier Tip-Off Classic	W 87–67	4–2	18 – Johnson	9 – McSwain	5 – Durham	Simon Skjodt Assembly Hall (12,024); Bloomington, IN
Nov 29*; 9:30 pm, ESPN		No. 1 Duke; ACC–Big Ten Challenge	L 81–91	4–3	17 – Johnson	6 – Morgan	4 – Green	Simon Skjodt Assembly Hall (17,222); Bloomington, IN
Dec 2; 12:30 pm, CBS		at Michigan	L 55–69	4–4 (0–1)	24 – Morgan	8 – Morgan	3 – Green	Crisler Center (11,661); Ann Arbor, MI
Dec 4; 8:00 pm, BTN		Iowa	W 77–64	5–4 (1–1)	15 – Morgan	10 – Morgan	4 – Green	Simon Skjodt Assembly Hall (17,222); Bloomington, IN
Dec 9*; 2:00 pm, ESPN		at Louisville	L 62–71	5–5	17 – Morgan	9 – Morgan	4 – Newkirk	KFC Yum! Center (20,030); Louisville, KY
Dec 16*; 2:30 pm, FOX		vs. No. 18 Notre Dame; Crossroads Classic	W 80–77 ^{OT}	6–5	34 – Morgan	11 – Morgan	4 – Johnson	Bankers Life Fieldhouse (18,680); Indianapolis, IN
Dec 18*; 8:00 pm, BTN		Fort Wayne	L 72–92	6–6	17 – Johnson	12 – Morgan	4 – Green	Simon Skjodt Assembly Hall (11,424); Bloomington, IN
Dec 21*; 8:00 pm, BTN		Tennessee Tech	W 87–59	7–6	20 – Newkirk	7 – Green	6 – Newkirk	Simon Skjodt Assembly Hall (12,122); Bloomington, IN
Dec 29*; 8:00 pm, BTN		Youngstown State	W 79–51	8–6	16 – Morgan	8 – McRoberts	5 – Newkirk	Simon Skjodt Assembly Hall (14,122); Bloomington, IN
Jan 2, 2018; 7:00 pm, ESPN		at Wisconsin	L 61–71	8–7 (1–2)	18 – Hartman	4 – Morgan	5 – Johnson	Kohl Center (17,287); Madison, WI
Jan 6; 5:15 pm, ESPN2		at Minnesota	W 75–71	9–7 (2–2)	28 – Johnson	12 – Morgan	7 – Johnson	Williams Arena (12,956); Minneapolis, MN
Jan 9; 6:30 pm, BTN		Penn State	W 74–70	10–7 (3–2)	21 – Morgan	11 – Morgan	4 – Newkirk	Simon Skjodt Assembly Hall (17,222); Bloomington, IN
Jan 14; 4:30 pm, CBS		Northwestern	W 66–46	11–7 (4–2)	17 – Johnson	6 – Johnson	5 – Hartman	Simon Skjodt Assembly Hall (17,222); Bloomington, IN
Jan 19; 7:00 pm, FS1		at No. 9 Michigan State	L 57–85	11–8 (4–3)	21 – Johnson	7 – Johnson	3 – Newkirk	Breslin Center (14,797); East Lansing, MI
Jan 22; 7:00 pm, FS1		Maryland	W 71–68	12–8 (5–3)	25 – Morgan	8 – Johnson	4 – Morgan	Simon Skjodt Assembly Hall (17,222); Bloomington, IN
Jan 24; 9:00 pm, BTN		at Illinois; Rivalry	L 71–73	12–9 (5–4)	28 – Morgan	8 – Morgan	5 – Green	State Farm Center (13,003); Champaign, IL
Jan 28; 3:30 pm, FOX		No. 3 Purdue; Rivalry/Indiana National Guard Governor's Cup	L 67–74	12–10 (5–5)	24 – Morgan	7 – Morgan	5 – Newkirk	Simon Skjodt Assembly Hall (17,222); Bloomington, IN
Jan 30; 7:00 pm, ESPN2		at No. 17 Ohio State	L 56–71	12–11 (5–6)	20 – Green	6 – Morgan	4 – Johnson	Value City Arena (14,041); Columbus, OH
Feb 3; 8:15 pm, ESPN		No. 5 Michigan State	L 60–63	12–12 (5–7)	22 – Morgan	16 – McSwain	6 – Green	Simon Skjodt Assembly Hall (17,222); Bloomington, IN
Feb 5; 7:00 pm, BTN		at Rutgers	W 65–43	13–12 (6–7)	24 – Morgan	9 – McSwain	4 – Green	Louis Brown Athletic Center (4,360); Piscataway, NJ
Feb 9; 7:30 pm, FS1		Minnesota	W 80–56	14–12 (7–7)	19 – Green	9 – Morgan	7 – Green	Simon Skjodt Assembly Hall (17,222); Bloomington, IN
Feb 14; 8:30 pm, BTN		Illinois; Rivalry	W 78–68	15–12 (8–7)	14 – Tied	10 – Morgan	4 – Johnson	Simon Skjodt Assembly Hall (17,222); Bloomington, IN
Feb 17; 2:00 pm, ESPN		at Iowa	W 84–82	16–12 (9–7)	29 – Johnson	4 – Green	6 – Green	Carver–Hawkeye Arena (15,229); Iowa City, IA
Feb 20; 9:00 pm, BTN		at Nebraska	L 57–66	16–13 (9–8)	16 – Tied	9 – Morgan	4 – Newkirk	Pinnacle Bank Arena (15,859); Lincoln, NE
Feb 23; 8:00 pm, FS1		No. 16 Ohio State	L 78–80 ^{2OT}	16–14 (9–9)	18 – Morgan	8 – McRoberts	6 – Newkirk	Simon Skjodt Assembly Hall (17,222); Bloomington, IN
Big Ten tournament
Mar 1; 9:00 pm, BTN	(6)	vs. (14) Rutgers; Second round	L 69–76	16–15	15 – Morgan	9 – Morgan	4 – Tied	Madison Square Garden (13,996); New York City, NY
*Non-conference game. ^{#}Rankings from AP Poll. (#) Tournament seedings in parentheses. All times are in Eastern Time.

== Player statistics ==
Individual player statistics (final)
			Minutes		Scoring		Total FGs			3-point FGs			Free-throws			Rebounds							
Player	GP	GS	Tot	Avg	Pts	Avg	FG	FGA	Pct	3FG	3FA	Pct	FT	FTA	Pct	Off	Def	Tot	Avg	A	Stl	Blk	TO
Blackmon, Vijay	0	0	0	0.0	0	0.0	0	0	.000	0	0	.000	0	0	.000	0	0	0	0.0	0	0	0	0
Davis, De'Ron	15	15	282	18.8	144	9.6	56	91	.615	0	0	.000	32	64	.500	27	37	64	4.3	16	12	22	12
Durham, Al	31	9	583	18.8	148	4.8	47	115	.409	14	49	.286	40	56	.714	5	54	59	1.9	39	11	4	25
Green, Devonte	31	12	697	22.5	236	7.6	80	220	.364	33	98	.337	43	61	.705	9	51	60	1.9	76	32	6	59
Hartman, Collin	23	0	354	15.4	97	4.2	35	95	.368	16	66	.242	11	16	.688	19	43	62	2.7	23	9	4	11
Jager, Johnny	6	0	7	1.2	0	0.0	0	0	.000	0	0	.000	0	0	.000	0	0	0	0.0	2	0	0	0
Johnson, Robert	31	31	1060	34.2	435	14.0	156	365	.427	66	177	.373	57	81	.704	6	133	139	4.5	84	25	6	76
Jones, Curtis	7	0	80	11.4	21	3.0	7	26	.269	4	18	.222	3	4	.750	1	8	9	1.3	3	3	2	2
Lasko, Ethan	1	0	1	1.0	0	0.0	0	0	.000	0	0	.000	0	0	.000	0	0	0	0.0	0	0	0	0
McRoberts, Zach	28	17	613	21.9	78	2.8	27	63	.429	13	33	.394	11	16	.688	35	60	95	3.4	33	37	4	18
McSwain, Freddie	31	8	453	14.6	130	4.2	45	101	.446	0	1	.000	40	70	.571	60	80	140	4.5	16	10	18	28
Moore, Clifton	9	0	43	4.8	6	0.7	3	12	.250	0	2	.000	0	0	.000	2	6	8	0.9	2	1	6	2
Morgan, Juwan	31	30	912	29.4	512	16.5	195	337	.579	16	53	.302	106	168	.631	84	144	228	7.4	47	37	44	51
Newkirk, Josh	31	24	721	23.3	221	7.1	73	193	.378	29	95	.305	46	57	.807	12	53	65	2.1	86	15	8	57
Priller, Tim	4	0	4	1.0	1	0.3	0	0	.000	0	0	.000	1	2	.500	0	2	2	0.5	0	0	0	0
Smith, Justin	31	9	463	14.9	200	6.5	82	149	.550	3	10	.300	33	49	.673	43	55	98	3.2	7	7	10	34
Taylor, Quentin	1	0	2	2.0	0	0.0	0	0	0.0	0	0	0.0	0	0	0.0	0	0	0	0.0	1	0	0	0
Total	31	-	6275	235.2	2229	71.90	806	1767	.456	194	602	.322	423	644	.657	345	754	1099	35.5	435	199	134	386
Opponents	31	-	6275	202.4	2178	70.26	773	1752	.441	235	640	.367	397	564	.704	314	740	1054	34.0	404	201	124	417

Legend
GP	Games played	GS	Games started	Avg	Average per game
FG	Field-goals made	FGA	Field-goal attempts	Off	Offensive rebounds
Def	Defensive rebounds	A	Assists	TO	Turnovers
Blk	Blocks	Stl	Steals	High	Team high

== See also ==
- 2017–18 Indiana Hoosiers women's basketball team
