= 2017–18 Denver Pioneers men's basketball team =

American college basketball season

2017–18 Denver Pioneers men's basketball
- Conference: The Summit League
- Record: 15–15 (8–6 The Summit)
- Head coach: Rodney Billups (2nd season)
- Assistant coaches: Ricardo Patton; Steve Snell; Dan Ficke
- Home arena: Magness Arena; Hamilton Gymnasium

2017–18 Summit League men's basketball standings
| | Conf. | | | | Overall |
| Team | W | | L | PCT | W | | L | PCT |
|---|---|---|---|---|---|---|---|---|
| South Dakota State † | 13 | – | 1 | .929 | 28 | – | 7 | .800 |
| South Dakota | 11 | – | 3 | .786 | 26 | – | 9 | .743 |
| Denver | 8 | – | 6 | .571 | 15 | – | 15 | .500 |
| Fort Wayne | 7 | – | 7 | .500 | 18 | – | 15 | .545 |
| North Dakota State | 5 | – | 9 | .357 | 15 | – | 17 | .469 |
| Oral Roberts | 5 | – | 9 | .357 | 11 | – | 21 | .344 |
| Omaha | 4 | – | 10 | .286 | 9 | – | 22 | .290 |
| Western Illinois | 3 | – | 11 | .214 | 12 | – | 16 | .429 |
† 2018 Summit League Tournament winner

The 2017–18 Denver Pioneers men's basketball team represented the University of Denver during the 2017–18 NCAA Division I men's basketball season. The Pioneers, led by second-year head coach Rodney Billups, played their home games at Magness Arena, with one home game at Hamilton Gymnasium, and are members of The Summit League. They finished the season 15–15, 8–6 in Summit League play to finish in third place. In the Summit League tournament, they defeated Oral Roberts in the quarterfinals before losing to South Dakota State in the semifinals.

== Previous season ==
The Pioneers finished the season 16–14, 8–8 in Summit League play to finish in a three-way tie for fourth place. They lost in the quarterfinals of the Summit League tournament to South Dakota State.

== Preseason ==
In a poll of league coaches, media, and sports information directors, the Pioneers were picked to finish in fifth place. Senior center Daniel Amigo was named to the preseason All-Summit First Team and senior guard Joe Rosga was named to the Second Team.

== Roster ==
2017–18 Denver Pioneers men's basketball team
Players
Coaches

| Pos. | # | Name | Height | Weight | Year | Hometown |
|---|---|---|---|---|---|---|
| G | 0 | Ade Murkey | 6 ft 5 in (1.96 m) | 200 lb (91 kg) | So | Minneapolis, Minnesota |
| G | 1 | Elijah Blake | 6 ft 2 in (1.88 m) | 175 lb (79 kg) | Fr | Denver, Colorado |
| G | 2 | Joe Rosga | 6 ft 3 in (1.91 m) | 175 lb (79 kg) | Jr | Saint Paul, Minnesota |
| G | 3 | Elvin Rodriguez | 6 ft 1 in (1.85 m) | 180 lb (82 kg) | Fr | Harlem, New York |
| G | 5 | Jake Pemberton | 6 ft 4 in (1.93 m) | 190 lb (86 kg) | Sr | Highlands Ranch, Colorado |
| G | 10 | Jake Holtzmann | 6 ft 6 in (1.98 m) | 195 lb (88 kg) | Jr | Parker, Colorado |
| F | 11 | Jake Krafka | 6 ft 7 in (2.01 m) | 215 lb (98 kg) | So | Austin, Texas |
| G | 12 | Luke Neff | 6 ft 0 in (1.83 m) | 155 lb (70 kg) | So | Arvada, Colorado |
| G | 14 | Drew Joiner | 6 ft 3 in (1.91 m) | 175 lb (79 kg) | RS Jr | Centennial, Colorado |
| G | 15 | Thomas Neff | 6 ft 5 in (1.96 m) | 200 lb (91 kg) | Jr | Arvada, Colorado |
| C | 24 | Christian Mackey | 6 ft 6 in (1.98 m) | 275 lb (125 kg) | Sr | Kirtland, New Mexico |
| F | 25 | Emil Knighton | 6 ft 7 in (2.01 m) | 220 lb (100 kg) | Jr | Parker, Colorado |
| F | 30 | Donoven Carlisle | 6 ft 8 in (2.03 m) | 210 lb (95 kg) | Fr | Indianapolis, Indiana |
| F | 32 | Abiola Akintola | 6 ft 6 in (1.98 m) | 220 lb (100 kg) | Jr | Melbourne, Australia |
| C | 44 | Daniel Amigo | 6 ft 10 in (2.08 m) | 245 lb (111 kg) | Sr | El Paso, Texas |

Head coach

- Rodney Billups (Denver)

Assistant coach(es)

- Ricardo Patton (Belmont)
- Steve Snell (Radford)
- Dan Ficke (Loyola (MD))

Legend

- (C) Team captain
- (S) Suspended
- (I) Ineligible
- (W) Walk-on
- Injured
- Current redshirt

Roster
Last update: October 26, 2017

== Schedule and results ==
| Date time, TV | Rank^{#} | Opponent^{#} | Result | Record | Site (attendance) city, state |
Non-conference regular season
| Nov 12, 2017*; 4:00 pm, ALT | | UC Irvine | L 69–83 | 0–1 | Magness Arena (1,202); Denver, CO |
| Nov 14, 2017*; 7:00 pm, P12N | | at Colorado | L 62–89 | 0–2 | Coors Events Center (6,451); Boulder, CO |
| Nov 16, 2017*; 5:00 pm | | Johnson & Wales (CO) | W 91–59 | 1–2 | Hamilton Gymnasium; Denver, CO |
| Nov 24, 2017*; 5:00 pm | | at Florida Gulf Coast; FGCU Shootout | L 71–79 | 1–3 | Alico Arena (3,517); Fort Myers, FL |
| Nov 25, 2017*; 2:00 pm | | vs. St. Francis Brooklyn; FGCU Shootout | W 60–50 | 2–3 | Alico Arena (202); Fort Myers, FL |
| Nov 26, 2017*; 10:00 am | | vs. Navy; FGCU Shootout | L 71–79 | 2–4 | Alico Arena (167); Fort Myers, FL |
| Nov 29, 2017*; 7:00 pm, ALT2 | | Wyoming | W 88–78 | 3–4 | Magness Arena (1,662); Denver, CO |
| Dec 2, 2017*; 1:00 pm, ALT2 | | Air Force | L 59–61 | 3–5 | Magness Arena (1,401); Denver, CO |
| Dec 5, 2017*; 7:00 pm, ALT2 | | San Jose State | W 58–56 | 4–5 | Magness Arena (1,028); Denver, CO |
| Dec 9, 2017*; 1:00 pm, ALT | | USC Upstate | W 84–69 | 5–5 | Magness Arena (951); Denver, CO |
| Dec 13, 2017*; 7:00 pm, CET | | at Northern Colorado | L 63–83 | 5–6 | Bank of Colorado Arena (1,153); Greeley, CO |
| Dec 15, 2017*; 8:00 pm, P12N | | at Stanford | L 62–75 | 5–7 | Maples Pavilion (3,303); Stanford, CA |
| Dec 18, 2017*; 7:00 pm | | at Montana State | L 65–79 | 5–8 | Brick Breeden Fieldhouse (2,200); Bozeman, MT |
| Dec 28, 2017*; 7:00 pm | | Colorado Mesa | W 106–60 | 6–8 | Magness Arena (1,567); Denver, CO |
The Summit League regular season
| Dec 30, 2017; 2:30 pm | | at South Dakota | L 71–82 | 6–9 (0–1) | Sanford Coyote Sports Center (2,334); Vermillion, SD |
| Jan 6, 2018; 1:00 pm, ALT | | Fort Wayne | L 63–82 | 6–10 (0–2) | Magness Arena (1,570); Denver, CO |
| Jan 11, 2018; 6:00 pm | | at North Dakota State | W 67–61 | 7–10 (1–2) | Scheels Center (2,543); Fargo, ND |
| Jan 13, 2018; 1:00 pm | | at South Dakota State | L 72–94 | 7–11 (1–3) | Frost Arena (2,793); Brookings, SD |
| Jan 18, 2018; 6:30 pm | | at Omaha | L 80–86 ^{2OT} | 7–12 (1–4) | Baxter Arena (1,916); Omaha, NE |
| Jan 20, 2018; 6:00 pm, ESPN3 | | at Oral Roberts | W 73–64 | 8–12 (2–4) | Mabee Center (5,023); Tulsa, OK |
| Jan 25, 2018; 7:00 pm | | Western Illinois | W 70–58 | 9–12 (3–4) | Magness Arena (935); Denver, CO |
| Jan 27, 2018; 4:00 pm, ALT2 | | South Dakota | W 84–68 | 10–12 (4–4) | Magness Arena (432); Denver, CO |
| Feb 3, 2018; 12:00 pm | | at Fort Wayne | L 63–91 | 10–13 (4–5) | Memorial Coliseum (2,010); Fort Wayne, IN |
| Feb 8, 2018; 7:00 pm, ALT2 | | South Dakota State | L 77–81 | 10–14 (4–6) | Magness Arena (1,555); Denver, CO |
| Feb 10, 2018; 1:00 pm, ALT | | North Dakota State | W 66–63 | 11–14 (5–6) | Magness Arena (1,568); Denver, CO |
| Feb 14, 2018; 7:00 pm, ALT2 | | Omaha | W 94–78 | 12–14 (6–6) | Magness Arena (1,020); Denver, CO |
| Feb 18, 2018; 4:00 pm, ALT2 | | Oral Roberts | W 66–65 | 13–14 (7–6) | Magness Arena (1,247); Denver, CO |
| Feb 24, 2018; 6:00 pm | | at Western Illinois | W 89–52 | 14–14 (8–6) | Western Hall (614); Macomb, IL |
The Summit League tournament
| Mar 4, 2018; 7:30 pm, ESPN3 | (3) | vs. (6) Oral Roberts; Quarterfinals | W 90–88 ^{2OT} | 15–14 | Premier Center (5,692); Sioux Falls, SD |
| Mar 5, 2018; 7:30 pm, ESPN3 | (3) | vs. (2) South Dakota; Semifinals | L 58–76 | 15–15 | Premier Center (8,835); Sioux Falls, SD |
*Non-conference game. ^{#}Rankings from AP Poll. (#) Tournament seedings in parentheses. All times are in Mountain Time.
