= 2017–18 Western Illinois Leathernecks men's basketball team =

American college basketball season

2017–18 Western Illinois Leathernecks men's basketball
- Conference: Summit League
- Record: 12–16 (3–11 The Summit)
- Head coach: Billy Wright (4th season)
- Assistant coaches: Josh Wolfe; Jestin Anderson; Joshua Jones
- Home arena: Western Hall

2017–18 Summit League men's basketball standings
	Conf.				Overall
Team	W		L	PCT	W		L	PCT
South Dakota State †	13	–	1	.929	28	–	7	.800
South Dakota	11	–	3	.786	26	–	9	.743
Denver	8	–	6	.571	15	–	15	.500
Fort Wayne	7	–	7	.500	18	–	15	.545
North Dakota State	5	–	9	.357	15	–	17	.469
Oral Roberts	5	–	9	.357	11	–	21	.344
Omaha	4	–	10	.286	9	–	22	.290
Western Illinois	3	–	11	.214	12	–	16	.429
† 2018 Summit League Tournament winner

The 2017–18 Western Illinois Leathernecks men's basketball team represented Western Illinois University during the 2017–18 NCAA Division I men's basketball season. The Leathernecks, led by fourth-year head coach Billy Wright, played their home games at Western Hall in Macomb, Illinois as members of the Summit League. They finished the season 12–16, 3–11 in Summit League play to finish in last place. They lost in the quarterfinals of the Summit League tournament to South Dakota State.

== Previous season ==
The Leathernecks finished the season 8–20, 5–11 in Summit League play to finish in eighth place. They lost in the quarterfinals of the Summit League tournament to South Dakota.

== Preseason ==
In a poll of league coaches, media, and sports information directors, the Leathernecks were picked to finish last in the Summit League.

== Roster ==
2017–18 Western Illinois Leathernecks men's basketball team
Players
Coaches

Pos.	#	Name	Height	Weight	Year	Hometown
G	10	Kobe Webster	6 ft 0 in (1.83 m)	160 lb (73 kg)	Fr	Indianapolis, Indiana
G	11	Delo Bruster	5 ft 11 in (1.8 m)	175 lb (79 kg)	Jr	Overland Park, Kansas
G	12	Otis Dortch	5 ft 10 in (1.78 m)	160 lb (73 kg)	Jr	Chicago, Illinois
G	14	Lynrick Moxey	6 ft 2 in (1.88 m)	205 lb (93 kg)	Sr	Exuma, Bahamas
G/F	15	Dalan Ancrum	6 ft 6 in (1.98 m)	190 lb (86 kg)	Sr	Austin, Texas
F	22	Jalen Morgan	6 ft 8 in (2.03 m)	205 lb (93 kg)	RS Jr	Indianapolis, Indiana
F	24	James Claar	6 ft 8 in (2.03 m)	205 lb (93 kg)	Jr	Bolingbrook, Illinois
G	25	Ryan Maas	6 ft 1 in (1.85 m)	185 lb (84 kg)	Jr	Pekin, Illinois
G	32	Jeremiah Usiosefe	6 ft 5 in (1.96 m)	200 lb (91 kg)	So	Hamilton, Ontario, Canada
C	34	Chris Snyder	6 ft 10 in (2.08 m)	240 lb (109 kg)	Sr	Cameron Park, California
G	35	Isaac Johnson	6 ft 5 in (1.96 m)	205 lb (93 kg)	Fr	Minneapolis, Minnesota
G	40	C. J. Duff	6 ft 1 in (1.85 m)	190 lb (86 kg)	So	Waukegan, Illinois
C	44	Jordan Hughes	6 ft 10 in (2.08 m)	235 lb (107 kg)	Jr	Schaumburg, Illinois
F/C	50	Charles Gavin	6 ft 7 in (2.01 m)	235 lb (107 kg)	Jr	Denver, Colorado
C	52	Brandon Gilbeck	6 ft 11 in (2.11 m)	235 lb (107 kg)	Jr	Spring Green, Wisconsin

Head coach

- Billy Wright (Bradley)

Assistant coach(es)

- Josh Wolfe (Hope College)
- Jestin Anderson (Quincy)
- Joshua Jones (Eastern Kentucky)

Legend

- (C) Team captain
- (S) Suspended
- (I) Ineligible
- (W) Walk-on
- Injured
- Current redshirt

Roster
Last update: November 1, 2017

== Schedule and results ==
Date time, TV	Rank^{#}	Opponent^{#}	Result	Record	Site (attendance) city, state
Regular season
Nov 11, 2017*; 7:00 pm		Saint Mary's (MN)	W 109–68	1–0	Western Hall (694); Macomb, IL
Nov 15, 2017*; 7:00 pm		Eastern Illinois	W 56–54	2–0	Western Hall (645); Macomb, IL
Nov 18, 2017*; 7:00 pm		Calvary	W 102–25	3–0	Western Hall (503); Macomb, IL
Nov 22, 2017*; 7:00 pm		at SIU Edwardsville	W 69–67	4–0	Vadalabene Center (1,126); Edwardsville, IL
Nov 25, 2017*; 7:00 pm		at Iowa State	L 45–70	4–1	Hilton Coliseum (13,647); Ames, IA
Nov 28, 2017*; 7:00 pm		IUPUI	W 90–77	5–1	Western Hall (589); Macomb, IL
Dec 2, 2017*; 7:00 pm		Miami (OH)	L 73–76 ^{2OT}	5–2	Western Hall (658); Macomb, IL
Dec 6, 2017*; 7:00 pm		American	W 69–56	6–2	Western Hall (616); Macomb, IL
Dec 9, 2017*; 7:00 pm		Milwaukee	W 90–69	7–2	Western Hall (663); Macomb, IL
Dec 19, 2017*; 7:30 pm		at Eastern Illinois	L 77–78	7–3	Lantz Arena (737); Charleston, IL
Dec 21, 2017*; 7:30 pm, FSN		at Butler	L 46–107	7–4	Hinkle Fieldhouse (7,779); Indianapolis, IN
Dec 31, 2017*; 2:00 pm		Lincoln Christian	W 91–57	8–4	Western Hall (523); Macomb, IL
Jan 3, 2018; 2:00 pm		at South Dakota	L 50–62	8–5 (0–1)	Sanford Coyote Sports Center (1,766); Vermillion, SD
Jan 6, 2018; 7:00 pm		at Oral Roberts	L 66–81	8–6 (0–2)	Mabee Center (2,146); Tulsa, OK
Jan 11, 2018; 7:00 pm		Omaha	L 66–87	8–7 (0–3)	Western Hall (467); Macomb, IL
Jan 13, 2018*; 2:00 pm		Oak Hills Christian	W 107–45	9–7	Western Hall (425); Macomb, IL
Jan 17, 2018; 7:00 pm		Fort Wayne	W 75–74 ^{OT}	10–7 (1–3)	Western Hall (482); Macomb, IL
Jan 20, 2018; 7:00 pm		South Dakota State	L 70–98	10–8 (1–4)	Western Hall (841); Macomb, IL
Jan 25, 2018; 8:00 pm		at Denver	L 58–70	10–9 (1–5)	Magness Arena (935); Denver, CO
Jan 27, 2018; 2:00 pm, ESPN3		at North Dakota State	L 69–80	10–10 (1–6)	Scheels Center (3,187); Fargo, ND
Feb 1, 2018; 7:00 pm, ESPN3		South Dakota	L 54–80	10–11 (1–7)	Western Hall (567); Macomb, IL
Feb 3, 2018; 2:00 pm, ESPN3		Oral Roberts	W 82–56	11–11 (2–7)	Western Hall (712); Macomb, IL
Feb 8, 2018; 7:00 pm		at Omaha	L 68–71	11–12 (2–8)	Baxter Arena (2,255); Omaha, NE
Feb 14, 2018; 6:00 pm		at Fort Wayne	L 74–90	11–13 (2–9)	Hilliard Gates Sports Center (948); Fort Wayne, IN
Feb 17, 2018; 2:00 pm		at South Dakota State	L 62–82	11–14 (2–10)	Frost Arena (2,873); Brookings, SD
Feb 22, 2018; 7:00 pm		North Dakota State	W 82–74	12–14 (3–10)	Western Hall (641); Macomb, IL
Feb 24, 2018; 7:00 pm		Denver	L 52–89	12–15 (3–11)	Western Hall (614); Macomb, IL
Summit League tournament
Mar 3, 2018; 6:00 pm, ESPN3	(8)	vs. (1) South Dakota State; Quarterfinals	L 60–66	12–16	Premier Center (10,771); Sioux Falls, SD
*Non-conference game. ^{#}Rankings from AP Poll. (#) Tournament seedings in parentheses. All times are in Central Time.
