= Archie Miller (basketball) =

American basketball coach (born 1978)

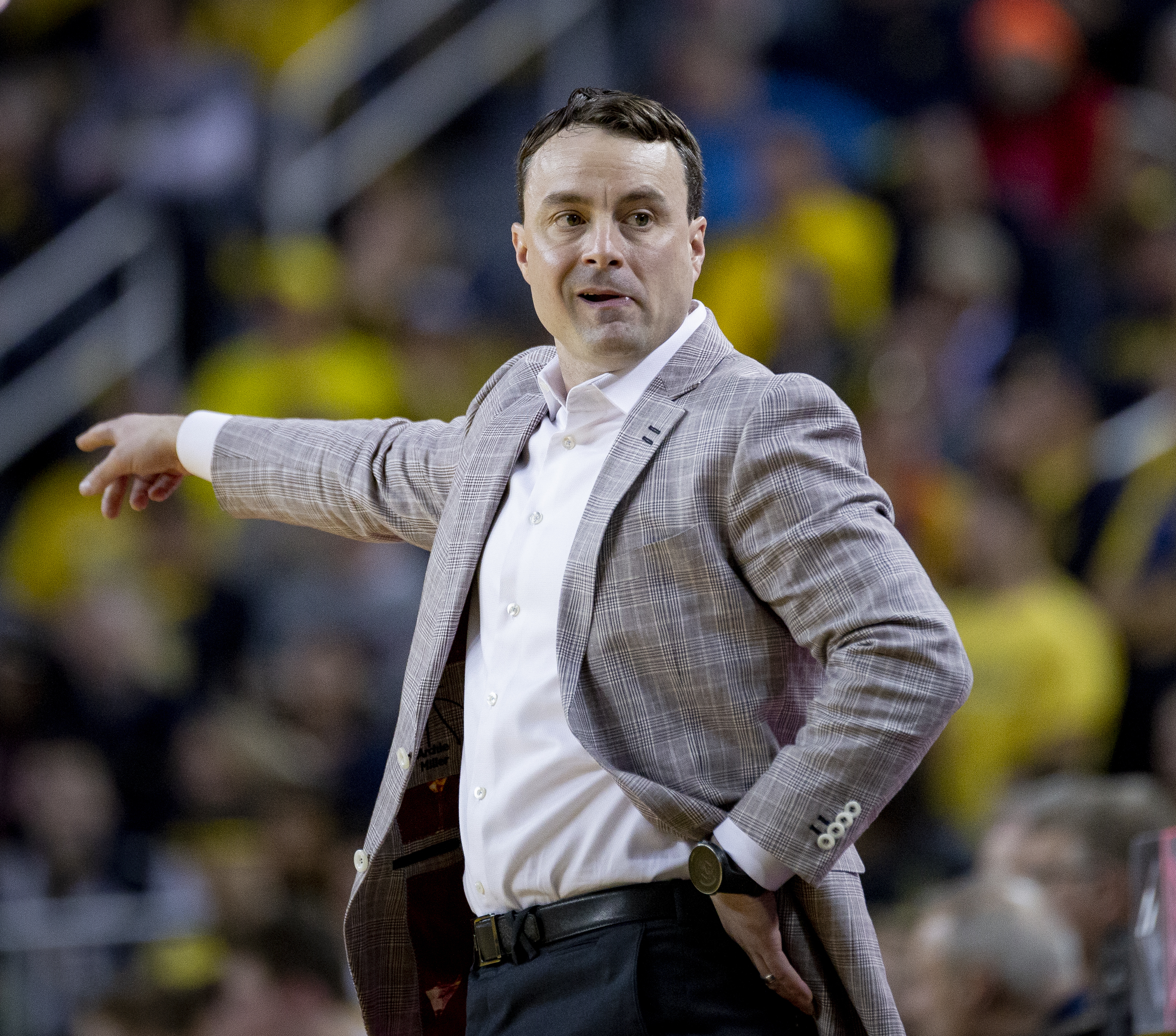
- Miller in 2020

Current position
- Title: Head coach
- Team: Rhode Island
- Conference: Atlantic 10
- Record: 60–72 (.455)

Biographical details
- Born: October 30, 1978 (age 48); Beaver Falls, Pennsylvania, U.S.

Playing career
- 1998–2002: NC State
- Position: Point guard

Coaching career (HC unless noted)
- 2003–2004: Western Kentucky (assistant)
- 2004–2006: NC State (assistant)
- 2006–2007: Arizona State (assistant)
- 2007–2009: Ohio State (assistant)
- 2009–2011: Arizona (assistant)
- 2011–2017: Dayton
- 2017–2021: Indiana
- 2022–present: Rhode Island

Head coaching record
- Overall: 266–193 (.580)
- Tournaments: 5–4 (NCAA Division I); 2–2 (NIT)

Accomplishments and honors

Championships
- 2 Atlantic 10 regular season (2016, 2017)

Awards
- Atlantic 10 Coach of the Year (2017)

Ryan Joseph "Archie" Miller (born October 30, 1978) is an American men's college basketball coach for the Rhode Island Rams.

Miller played point guard for North Carolina State from 1998 to 2002 and ended his career among the school's leaders in free-throw percentage, three-point field goal percentage, and total three-pointers. From 2011 to 2017, he was the head coach for the University of Dayton and won the conference regular season championship in 2016 and 2017, when he was named the Atlantic 10 Coach of the Year. He left Dayton to be the head coach of the Indiana Hoosiers in 2017, but was relieved of his duties after only four seasons following the conclusion of the 2020–2021 season. After not coaching a team during the 2021–22 NCAA Division I men's basketball season, he was named the head coach of the Rhode Island Rams men's basketball team on March 18, 2022.

== Early years and playing career ==
Miller was born and raised in Beaver Falls, Pennsylvania, just northwest of Pittsburgh, Pennsylvania. His given name is "Ryan" but garnered the nickname "Archie" at an early age due to his personality being similar to that of Archie Bunker, the grouchy TV character from All in the Family.

Miller grew up in a basketball family. Both he and his older brother Sean Miller played for their father, John Miller, a former coach at Blackhawk High School, who went 657–280 in a 35-year coaching career, including 104–29 in the postseason, before retiring in 2005. He won eight Western Pennsylvania Interscholastic Athletic League championships, the second most in history, and four Pennsylvania Interscholastic Athletic Association titles. Miller noted how much he learned from his father, saying, "He's really teaching you how to be a coach, and you don't even realize it. He knew what hard work was. He knew what dedication was. He knew what preparation was. He knew how to communicate. It starts to come naturally to you. It's all you do. It's all you're around, and it's all you talk about.”

In addition to his father's connection to the game, Miller's brother, Sean, was a point guard who went on to play the position at Pitt. Archie views Sean, who is 10 years older, as more of a mentor than a rival. Sean, then an assistant at North Carolina State University, recruited Archie to play as a point guard. Sean later also hired Archie as an assistant at Arizona when he got the job in 2009. “We didn’t grow up in the house together two years apart and the backyard,” Archie said. “... I basically look at him sort of as the role model, the guy whom to be like, the guy who to call when you need something, the one that helped you get to where you wanted to get to." Miller's sister, Lisa, also played Division I basketball at Toledo and Elon.

Following high school, Miller played point guard for North Carolina State from 1998 to 2002. As a senior, he helped lead the Wolfpack to the championship game of the ACC Tournament, and was named to the all-tournament team. He finished his career there with an 84.6% free-throw percentage, a 42.9 three-point field goal percentage, and 218 three-pointers, which were all marks that ranked in the top 10 in school history. He graduated from NC State in 2002 with his bachelor's degree in Parks, Recreation and Tourism.

== Coaching career ==
=== Assistant coaching positions (2003–2011) ===
Miller spent time at several programs as an assistant coach, spending a season at Western Kentucky (2003–04), two at NC State (2004–2006), one at Arizona State (2006–07) under former coach Herb Sendek, two at Ohio State (2007–09) under Thad Matta, and two at Arizona (2009–11) under his brother Sean. While at Arizona, Miller shined as a top recruiter, helping secure Arizona's top 10 recruiting class for 2011 recruits. He also excelled as a game strategist and designed the Wildcats' upset of eighth-ranked Texas to get them to the Sweet 16.

=== University of Dayton (2011–2017) ===
Miller became the head coach of the Dayton Flyers men's basketball team in 2011 and turned around a program that had back-to-back disappointing seasons. His first season with Dayton saw Miller take the school to 20 wins. In his third year, 2014, he had the Flyers in the Elite Eight with 26 wins; to get there, Dayton upset three higher seeded teams. After the Elite Eight run in 2014, Miller faced replacing three starters and four seniors from that team. Despite having a depleted roster featuring just six players who were recruited to Dayton and no active player taller than 6-foot-6, Miller led his Flyers to a 27–9 overall record and to the third round of the 2015 NCAA tournament.

In the following three seasons, Miller averaged over 25 wins and each year coached the team made to the NCAA tournament. The latter two the Flyers also earned regular season Atlantic 10 champion titles. The Flyers' 78 wins in from 2013–16 matched the best three-year period in school history. Due to his coaching abilities, Miller was named a finalist for the 2015 Jim Phelan National Coach of the Year Award. In April 2015, he joined his father and brother in the Beaver County Sports Hall of Fame.

=== Indiana University (2017–2021) ===
On March 27, 2017, Miller was named the 29th head coach in the history of the Indiana Hoosiers men's basketball team. Miller's first season involved rebuilding the program and laying the foundation of a pack-line defense and valuing possessions. Early in the season, Miller stated practices were 75% defense and 25% offense. With an early second round loss in the 2018 Big Ten tournament and no invitation to either the NCAA tournament or NIT, Indiana's first season under their new coach came to a disappointing close with an overall record of 16–15 and 9–9 in the Big Ten. Nevertheless, Miller got off to an impressive recruiting start, including the commitment of five star recruit Romeo Langford, a McDonald's-All American, 2018 Indiana Mr. Basketball, and (according to ESPN) the six ranked player in the nation.

Despite getting off to a strong start of 12–2, including three conference wins, the 2018–19 Hoosiers struggled down the backstretch of the season. Riddled with injuries and poor shooting, Indiana lost 12 of 13 games before turning things around and finishing the regular season with a four-game winning streak. Indiana failed to receive a bid to the NCAA tournament but earned a 1-seed in the NIT, where they lost in the quarterfinals, ending the season with an overall record of 19–16 and 8–12 in the Big Ten.

For the 2019–20 season, the Hoosiers started off 11–1 before ending their season with an overall record of 20–12 record including a conference record of 9–11. They won their first game of the Big Ten tournament before it was announced that the rest of the tournament was to be cancelled due to the COVID-19 pandemic. The NCAA tournament was later cancelled; the Hoosiers were expected to make the tournament for the first time in Miller's tenure.

The 2020–21 season proved to be the most disappointing of Miller's tenure with the Hoosiers ending the season on a six-game losing streak, including a first round loss in the Big Ten tournament against Rutgers. Indiana finished the season with a 12–15 record and a 7–12 Big Ten record. The Hoosiers lost to Purdue twice during the season, making Miller's record against Purdue 0–7. The Hoosiers failed to receive a bid to the 2021 NCAA Tournament. On March 15, 2021, Miller was fired by Indiana. He finished his four seasons at Indiana with a 67–56 record, a 33–43 Big Ten record, and no NCAA tournament appearances.

=== Rhode Island ===
On March 18, 2022, Miller reached a deal to be the new head coach at Rhode Island.

== Coaching philosophy ==
Miller employs a structured transition offense intended to open up games, create foul trouble for opponents, and score before the defense can get set. His offensive approach has been called "one of the most complete transition offensive systems you will find." He frequently uses a "Phoenix fast break" with players pushing the ball off of rebounds and turnovers in a flexible system that can take on a variety of alignments. He will modify the Phoenix break based on personnel to accommodate five guards or two post players on the floor at once. If an opponent scores, Miller employs a "Carolina transition offense" to create scoring opportunities which flow right into a motion offense.

The identity of Miller's teams are rooted in defense. He employs a "pack line defense", which is a variation of man-to-man defense invented by Dick Bennett at Wisconsin and also employed by Tony Bennett at Virginia and Tom Izzo at Michigan State, among others. Instead of the off-ball defenders pressuring their player and denying the pass, everyone except the player guarding the ball must be inside an imaginary line 16 feet from the rim. At all times a defender pressures the player with the basketball, while the other four defenders play in gap/help positions. However, if the offensive player picks up the dribble, all players go out and deny looking for the steal. The pack line defense is intended to discourage penetration, getting inside the paint, and forces opponents to win with a well executed offense and good outside shooting.

== Personal life ==
While attending NC State, Miller met Morgan Cruse, who was also a student and athlete for the Wolfpack. Morgan was on the NC State track and field team. The couple dated during college and married in 2003. In 2004, they had a daughter, Leah. His brother Sean Miller is the head basketball coach at the University of Texas.

== Head coaching record ==
Record table
Season	Team	Overall	Conference	Standing	Postseason
Dayton Flyers (Atlantic 10 Conference) (2011–2017)
2011–12	Dayton	20–13	9–7	5th	NIT First Round
2012–13	Dayton	17–14	7–9	11th	
2013–14	Dayton	26–11	10–6	T–5th	NCAA Division I Elite Eight
2014–15	Dayton	27–9	13–5	T–2nd	NCAA Division I Round of 32
2015–16	Dayton	25–8	14–4	T–1st	NCAA Division I Round of 64
2016–17	Dayton	24–8	15–3	1st	NCAA Division I Round of 64
Dayton:		139–63 (.688)	68–34 (.667)		
Indiana Hoosiers (Big Ten Conference) (2017–2021)
2017–18	Indiana	16–15	9–9	T–6th	
2018–19	Indiana	19–16	8–12	9th	NIT Quarterfinals
2019–20	Indiana	20–12	9–11	T–10th	
2020–21	Indiana	12–15	7–12	T–10th	
Indiana:		67–58 (.536)	33–44 (.429)		
Rhode Island Rams (Atlantic 10 Conference) (2022–present)
2022–23	Rhode Island	9–22	5–13	14th	
2023–24	Rhode Island	12–20	6–12	T–10th	
2024–25	Rhode Island	18–13	7–11	T–10th	
2025–26	Rhode Island	16–16	7–11	10th	
2026–27	Rhode Island	5–1	0–0		
Rhode Island:		60–72 (.455)	25–47 (.347)		
Total:		266–193 (.580)			
National champion Postseason invitational champion Conference regular season champion Conference regular season and conference tournament champion Division regular season champion Division regular season and conference tournament champion Conference tournament champion
