= 2017–18 Omaha Mavericks men's basketball team =

American college basketball season

2017–18 Omaha Mavericks men's basketball
- Conference: The Summit League
- Record: 9–22 (4–10 The Summit)
- Head coach: Derrin Hansen (13th season)
- Assistant coaches: Pat Eberhart; Tyler Erwin; Tyler Bullock
- Home arena: Baxter Arena

2017–18 Summit League men's basketball standings
	Conf.				Overall
Team	W		L	PCT	W		L	PCT
South Dakota State †	13	–	1	.929	28	–	7	.800
South Dakota	11	–	3	.786	26	–	9	.743
Denver	8	–	6	.571	15	–	15	.500
Fort Wayne	7	–	7	.500	18	–	15	.545
North Dakota State	5	–	9	.357	15	–	17	.469
Oral Roberts	5	–	9	.357	11	–	21	.344
Omaha	4	–	10	.286	9	–	22	.290
Western Illinois	3	–	11	.214	12	–	16	.429
† 2018 Summit League Tournament winner

The 2017–18 Omaha Mavericks men's basketball team represented the University of Nebraska Omaha during the 2017–18 NCAA Division I men's basketball season. The Mavericks, led by 13th-year head coach Derrin Hansen, played their home games at Baxter Arena as members of The Summit League. They finished the season 9–22, 4–10 in Summit League play to finish in seventh place. They lost in the quarterfinals of the Summit League tournament to South Dakota.

== Previous season ==
The Mavericks finished the season 18–14, 9–7 in Summit League play to finish in third place. They beat Fort Wayne and IUPUI before losing to South Dakota State in the Summit League tournament championship.

== Preseason ==
In a poll of league coaches, media, and sports information directors, the Mavericks were picked to finish in sixth place.

== Roster ==
2017–18 Omaha Mavericks men's basketball team
Players
Coaches

Pos.	#	Name	Height	Weight	Year	Hometown
G	0	JT Gibson	6 ft 3 in (1.91 m)	195 lb (88 kg)	RS So	Brooklyn Park, Minnesota
G	1	Renard Suggs	6 ft 2 in (1.88 m)	210 lb (95 kg)	RS Sr	Saint Paul, Minnesota
F	3	Lamar Wofford-Humphrey	6 ft 9 in (2.06 m)	225 lb (102 kg)	RS Sr	Chicago, Illinois
G	4	Zach Thornhill	6 ft 4 in (1.93 m)	185 lb (84 kg)	Fr	Lenexa, Kansas
G	5	K. J. Robinson	6 ft 0 in (1.83 m)	190 lb (86 kg)	So	Blue Springs, Missouri
G	10	Ayo Akinwole	6 ft 0 in (1.83 m)	165 lb (75 kg)	Fr	Papillion, Nebraska
G	11	Alex Allbery	6 ft 1 in (1.85 m)	205 lb (93 kg)	Sr	Omaha, Nebraska
G	13	Daniel Norl	6 ft 3 in (1.91 m)	200 lb (91 kg)	Sr	Clarksville, Tennessee
F	15	Brenden Lipovsky	6 ft 4 in (1.93 m)	185 lb (84 kg)	Jr	Fairfield, Nebraska
G	20	Hayden Miller	6 ft 1 in (1.85 m)	180 lb (82 kg)	Fr	Nebraska City, Nebraska
G	21	Zach Jackson	6 ft 5 in (1.96 m)	185 lb (84 kg)	Jr	Wichita, Kansas
F	32	Daniel Meyer	6 ft 9 in (2.06 m)	250 lb (113 kg)	Sr	Billings, Montana
C	33	Evan Tricker	6 ft 11 in (2.11 m)	180 lb (82 kg)	Fr	Naples, Florida
F	40	Matt Pile	6 ft 8 in (2.03 m)	240 lb (109 kg)	Fr	Goddard, Kansas
F	44	Mitch Hahn	6 ft 8 in (2.03 m)	210 lb (95 kg)	Jr	Fremont, Nebraska
F		Wanjang Tut	6 ft 8 in (2.03 m)	205 lb (93 kg)	RS Fr	Omaha, Nebraska

Head coach

- Derrin Hansen (Nebraska Wesleyan)

Assistant coach(es)

- Pat Eberhart (Adams State)
- Tyler Erwin (Midland)
- Tyler Bullock (Omaha)

Legend

- (C) Team captain
- (S) Suspended
- (I) Ineligible
- (W) Walk-on
- Injured
- Current redshirt

Roster
Last update: October 27, 2017

== Schedule and results ==
Date time, TV	Rank^{#}	Opponent^{#}	Result	Record	Site (attendance) city, state
Exhibition
Oct 26, 2017*; 7:00 pm		at Creighton; ARC hurricane relief charity game	L 67–96		CenturyLink Center Omaha (8,280); Omaha, NE
Regular season
Nov 10, 2017*; 7:00 pm		vs. Montana State; Great Falls Showcase	L 80–89 ^{OT}	0–1	Pacific Steel & Recycling Arena (4,307); Great Falls, MT
Nov 12, 2017*; 2:00 pm, FSOK		at Oklahoma	L 89–108	0–2	Lloyd Noble Center (9,045); Norman, OK
Nov 14, 2017*; 8:00 pm		at New Mexico; Emerald Coast Classic campus-site game	L 71–103	0–3	Dreamstyle Arena (9,601); Albuquerque, NM
Nov 17, 2017*; 6:00 pm, ACCN Extra		at No. 18 Louisville	L 78–87	0–4	KFC Yum! Center (18,112); Louisville, KY
Nov 20, 2017*; 8:00 pm, FSSW		at TCU; Emerald Coast Classic campus-site game	L 66–99	0–5	Schollmaier Arena (6,733); Fort Worth, TX
Nov 24, 2017*; 11:00 am		vs. Tennessee Tech; Emerald Coast Classic Pool B semifinals	L 85–86	0–6	The Arena at NFSC (325); Niceville, FL
Nov 25, 2017*; 10:00 am		vs. Jackson State; Emerald Coast Classic Pool B 3rd place game	L 73–75 ^{OT}	0–7	The Arena at NFSC (125); Niceville, FL
Nov 29, 2017*; 7:00 pm, YurView		Drake	W 75–73	1–7	Baxter Arena (1,525); Omaha, NE
Dec 3, 2017*; 6:00 pm, P12N		at Washington	L 73–86	1–8	Alaska Airlines Arena (4,903); Seattle, WA
Dec 5, 2017*; 9:00 pm		at UC Santa Barbara	L 70–77	1–9	The Thunderdome (1,322); Santa Barbara, CA
Dec 9, 2017*; 5:00 pm, ESPN3		at Drake	L 74–93	1–10	Knapp Center (2,718); Des Moines, IA
Dec 13, 2017*; 7:00 pm		Arkansas State	W 77–74	2–10	Baxter Arena (2,250); Omaha, NE
Dec 17, 2017*; 1:00 pm		Cornell College	W 99–58	3–10	Baxter Arena (1,467); Omaha, NE
Dec 18, 2017*; 6:00 pm, ESPN2		at No. 14 Kansas	L 64–109	3–11	Allen Fieldhouse (16,300); Lawrence, KS
Dec 21, 2017*; 7:00 pm		Montana State	W 84–71	4–11	Baxter Arena (2,033); Omaha, NE
Dec 30, 2017; 7:00 pm		at Oral Roberts	L 74–93	4–12 (0–1)	Mabee Center (2,167); Tulsa, OK
Jan 2, 2018*; 7:00 pm		Doane	W 100–60	5–12	Baxter Arena (1,965); Omaha, NE
Jan 6, 2018; 7:00 pm		South Dakota State	L 88–101	5–13 (0–2)	Baxter Arena (3,447); Omaha, NE
Jan 11, 2018; 7:00 pm		at Western Illinois	W 87–66	6–13 (1–2)	Western Hall (467); Macomb, IL
Jan 13, 2018; 6:00 pm		at Fort Wayne	L 78–82	6–14 (1–3)	Memorial Coliseum (1,590); Fort Wayne, IN
Jan 18, 2018; 7:30 pm		Denver	W 86–80 ^{2OT}	7–14 (2–3)	Baxter Arena (1,916); Omaha, NE
Jan 20, 2018; 7:00 pm, YurView		South Dakota	L 71–85	7–15 (2–4)	Baxter Arena (3,070); Omaha, NE
Jan 25, 2018; 7:00 pm, MidcoSN		at North Dakota State	L 58–73	7–16 (2–5)	Scheels Center (2,507); Fargo, ND
Jan 30, 2018; 7:00 pm, MidcoSN		at South Dakota State	L 60–80	7–17 (2–6)	Frost Arena (1,837); Brookings, SD
Feb 8, 2018; 7:00 pm		Western Illinois	W 71–68	8–17 (3–6)	Baxter Arena (2,255); Omaha, NE
Feb 10, 2018; 7:00 pm		Fort Wayne	W 90–85	9–17 (4–6)	Baxter Arena (4,106); Omaha, NE
Feb 14, 2018; 8:00 pm, ALT2		at Denver	L 78–94	9–18 (4–7)	Magness Arena (1,020); Denver, CO
Feb 17, 2018; 8:00 pm, MidcoSN		at South Dakota	L 64–79	9–19 (4–8)	Sanford Coyote Sports Center (2,864); Vermillion, SD
Feb 22, 2018; 7:00 pm, YurView		Oral Roberts	L 75–83	9–20 (4–9)	Baxter Arena (1,899); Omaha, NE
Feb 24, 2018; 1:00 pm, YurView		North Dakota State	L 62–84	9–21 (4–10)	Baxter Arena (2,467); Omaha, NE
Summit League tournament
Mar 3, 2018; 8:30 pm, ESPN3/MidcoSN	(7)	vs. (2) South Dakota; Quarterfinals	L 73–87	9–22	Premier Center (10,771); Sioux Falls, SD
*Non-conference game. ^{#}Rankings from AP Poll. (#) Tournament seedings in parentheses. All times are in Central Time Source.
