= 2018 Summit League men's basketball tournament =

- Classification: Division I
- Season: 2017–18
- Teams: 8
- Site: Denny Sanford Premier Center; Sioux Falls, South Dakota
- Champions: South Dakota State (5th title)
- Winning coach: T. J. Otzelberger (2nd title)
- MVP: Mike Daum (South Dakota State)
- Television: Midco Sport Network, ESPN3, ESPN2

2017–18 Summit League men's basketball standings
	Conf.				Overall
Team	W		L	PCT	W		L	PCT
South Dakota State †	13	–	1	.929	28	–	7	.800
South Dakota	11	–	3	.786	26	–	9	.743
Denver	8	–	6	.571	15	–	15	.500
Fort Wayne	7	–	7	.500	18	–	15	.545
North Dakota State	5	–	9	.357	15	–	17	.469
Oral Roberts	5	–	9	.357	11	–	21	.344
Omaha	4	–	10	.286	9	–	22	.290
Western Illinois	3	–	11	.214	12	–	16	.429
† 2018 Summit League Tournament winner

The 2018 Summit League men's basketball tournament was the postseason men's basketball tournament for the Summit League for the 2017–18 season. All tournament games were played at the Denny Sanford Premier Center in Sioux Falls, South Dakota, from March 3–6, 2018. Regular season champion South Dakota State defeated South Dakota in the championship game to win the tournament and receive the conference's automatic bid to the NCAA tournament.

== Seeds ==
All eight teams in the Summit League were eligible to compete in the conference tournament. Teams were seeded by record within the conference, with a tiebreaker system to seed teams with identical conference records.

Seed	School	Conference	Tiebreaker	Tiebreaker 2	Tiebreaker 3
1	South Dakota State	13–1			
2	South Dakota	11–3			
3	Denver	8–6			
4	Fort Wayne	7–7			
5	North Dakota State	5–9	1–1 vs ORU	0–2 vs SDSU	1–1 vs SD
6	Oral Roberts	5–9	1–1 vs NDSU	0–2 vs SDSU	0–2 vs SD
7	Omaha	4–10			
8	Western Illinois	3–11			

== Schedule and results ==
Game	Time	Matchup	Score	Television
Quarterfinals – Saturday, March 3
1	6:00 pm	No. 1 South Dakota State vs. No. 8 Western Illinois	66–60	Midco Sport Network; ESPN3
2	8:30 pm	No. 2 South Dakota vs. No. 7 Omaha	87–73	Midco Sport Network; ESPN3
Quarterfinals – Sunday, March 4
3	6:00 pm	No. 4 Fort Wayne vs. No. 5 North Dakota State	82–86	Midco Sport Network; ESPN3
4	8:30 pm	No. 3 Denver vs. No 6 Oral Roberts	90–88 ^{2OT}	Midco Sport Network; ESPN3
Semifinals – Monday, March 5
5	6:00 pm	No. 1 South Dakota State vs. No. 5 North Dakota State	78–57	Midco Sport Network; ESPN3
6	8:30 pm	No. 2 South Dakota vs. No. 3 Denver	76–58	Midco Sport Network; ESPN3
Final – Tuesday, March 6
7	8:00 pm	No. 1 South Dakota State vs. No. 2 South Dakota	97–87	ESPN2
*Game times in CST. Rankings denote tournament seed

== Bracket ==
Quarterfinals; March 3 & 4 MidcoSN
1	South Dakota State	66
8	Western Illinois	60
4	Fort Wayne	82
5	North Dakota State	86
2	South Dakota	87
7	Omaha	73
3	Denver	90
6	Oral Roberts	88 ^{2OT}

Semifinals; March 5 MidcoSN
1	South Dakota State	78
5	North Dakota State	57
2	South Dakota	76
3	Denver	58

Final; March 6 ESPN2
1	South Dakota State	97
2	South Dakota	87
