= 2017–18 Oral Roberts Golden Eagles men's basketball team =

American college basketball season

2017–18 Oral Roberts Golden Eagles men's basketball
- Conference: Summit League
- Record: 11–21 (5–9 Summit)
- Head coach: Paul Mills (1st season)
- Assistant coaches: Rodney Perry; Talvin Hester; Sam Patterson
- Home arena: Mabee Center

2017–18 Summit League men's basketball standings
	Conf.				Overall
Team	W		L	PCT	W		L	PCT
South Dakota State †	13	–	1	.929	28	–	7	.800
South Dakota	11	–	3	.786	26	–	9	.743
Denver	8	–	6	.571	15	–	15	.500
Fort Wayne	7	–	7	.500	18	–	15	.545
North Dakota State	5	–	9	.357	15	–	17	.469
Oral Roberts	5	–	9	.357	11	–	21	.344
Omaha	4	–	10	.286	9	–	22	.290
Western Illinois	3	–	11	.214	12	–	16	.429
† 2018 Summit League Tournament winner

The 2017–18 Oral Roberts Golden Eagles men's basketball team represented Oral Roberts University during the 2017–18 NCAA Division I men's basketball season. The Golden Eagles were led by first-year head coach Paul Mills and played their home games at the Mabee Center in Tulsa, Oklahoma as members of The Summit League. They finished the season 11–21, 5–9 in Summit League play to finish in a tie for fifth place. They lost in the quarterfinals of the Summit League tournament to Denver.

== Previous season ==
The Golden Eagles finished the season 8–22, 4–12 in Summit League play to finish in last place. As a result, they failed to qualify for The Summit League tournament.

On April 10, 2017, the school fired all-time winningest coach Scott Sutton after 18 years. He finished with an overall record of 328–247. On April 28, the school hired Baylor assistant Paul Mills as the new head coach.

== Preseason ==
In a poll of league coaches, media, and sports information directors, the Golden Eagles were picked to finish in seventh place. Senior center Albert Owens was named to the preseason All-Summit First Team and sophomore forward Emmanuel Nzekwesi was named to the Second Team.

== Roster ==
2017–18 Oral Roberts Golden Eagles men's basketball team
Players
Coaches

Pos.	#	Name	Height	Weight	Year	Hometown
G	1	James Conley	6 ft 3 in (1.91 m)	170 lb (77 kg)	Jr	Derby, Kansas
G	2	Austin Ruder	6 ft 3 in (1.91 m)	190 lb (86 kg)	Sr	Nixa, Missouri
G	3	Jontray Harris	6 ft 4 in (1.93 m)	188 lb (85 kg)	RS Jr	Austin, Texas
G	10	Sam Kearns	6 ft 0 in (1.83 m)	190 lb (86 kg)	So	San Antonio, Texas
G	12	Josiah Showman	6 ft 5 in (1.96 m)	210 lb (95 kg)	So	Tulsa, Oklahoma
G	20	Spencer Sutton	6 ft 4 in (1.93 m)	215 lb (98 kg)	RS Fr	Tulsa, Oklahoma
F	23	Emmanuel Nzekwesi	6 ft 8 in (2.03 m)	230 lb (104 kg)	So	Trophy Club, Texas
G	24	R.J. Fuqua	5 ft 11 in (1.8 m)	170 lb (77 kg)	Fr	Tulsa, Oklahoma
F	25	Javan White	6 ft 10 in (2.08 m)	230 lb (104 kg)	RS So	Ames, Iowa
F	32	Kellen Manek	6 ft 7 in (2.01 m)	227 lb (103 kg)	RS Fr	Harrah, Oklahoma
F	33	Emir Ahmedic	6 ft 8 in (2.03 m)	250 lb (113 kg)	RS Fr	Kladanj, Bosnia and Herzegovina
C	44	Albert Owens	6 ft 9 in (2.06 m)	250 lb (113 kg)	Sr	Cedar Hill, Texas
F	52	Chris Miller	6 ft 8 in (2.03 m)	255 lb (116 kg)	So	Tulsa, Oklahoma

Head coach

- Paul Mills (Texas A&M)

Assistant coach(es)

- Rodney Perry (Dallas Christian)
- Talvin Hester (Texas Wesleyan)
- Sam Patterson (Baylor)

Legend

- (C) Team captain
- (S) Suspended
- (I) Ineligible
- (W) Walk-on
- Injured
- Current redshirt

Roster
Last update: November 1, 2017

== Schedule and results ==
Date time, TV	Rank^{#}	Opponent^{#}	Result	Record	Site (attendance) city, state
Regular season
Nov 10, 2017*; 7:00 pm		Avila	W 86–72	1–0	Mabee Center (2,521); Tulsa, OK
Nov 13, 2017*; 7:00 pm		at Tulsa; Mayor's Cup	L 71–90	1–1	Reynolds Center (4,437); Tulsa, OK
Nov 16, 2017*; 7:00 pm, FSOK+		at Oklahoma State; Legends Classic	L 48–91	1–2	Gallagher-Iba Arena (4,268); Stillwater, OK
Nov 20, 2017*; 7:00 pm		vs. Montana; Legends Classic	L 64–69	1–3	Firestone Fieldhouse (1,682); Malibu, CA
Nov 21, 2017*; 9:30 pm		vs. Pepperdine; Legends Classic	L 76–80	1–4	Firestone Fieldhouse (1,239); Malibu, CA
Nov 24, 2017*; 2:00 pm, BTN+		at Penn State; Legends Classic	L 48–86	1–5	Bryce Jordan Center (4,463); University Park, PA
Nov 27, 2017*; 7:00 pm, ESPN3		Oakland	L 86–93 ^{OT}	1–6	Mabee Center (1,754); Tulsa, OK
Nov 29, 2017*; 7:00 pm, FSKC		at Kansas State	L 68–77	1–7	Bramlage Coliseum (7,273); Manhattan, KS
Dec 2, 2017*; 3:00 pm		at Little Rock	W 74–66 ^{2OT}	2–7	Jack Stephens Center (2,111); Little Rock, AR
Dec 5, 2017*; 9:00 pm		at UNLV	L 66–92	2–8	MGM Grand Garden Arena (6,713); Paradise, NV
Dec 8, 2017*; 7:00 pm		Southern Nazarene	L 60–68	2–9	Mabee Center (2,152); Tulsa, OK
Dec 10, 2017*; 3:00 pm		Missouri State	W 73–66	3–9	Mabee Center (2,331); Tulsa, OK
Dec 16, 2017*; 7:15 pm, ESPN3		at Florida Gulf Coast	W 83–64	4–9	Alico Arena (3,316); Fort Myers, FL
Dec 19, 2017*; 7:00 pm, ESPN3		at Arkansas	L 69–104	4–10	Bud Walton Arena (13,945); Fayetteville, AR
Dec 21, 2017*; 7:00 pm, BTN+		at Minnesota	L 63–77	4–11	Williams Arena (11,234); Minneapolis, MN
Dec 30, 2017; 7:00 pm		Omaha	W 93–74	5–11 (1–0)	Mabee Center (2,167); Tulsa, OK
Jan 4, 2018; 7:00 pm		Fort Wayne	W 76–60	6–11 (2–0)	Mabee Center (2,219); Tulsa, OK
Jan 6, 2018; 7:00 pm		Western Illinois	W 81–66	7–11 (3–0)	Mabee Center (2,146); Tulsa, OK
Jan 11, 2018; 7:00 pm, ESPN3		at South Dakota State	L 75–78	7–12 (3–1)	Frost Arena (2,221); Brookings, SD
Jan 13, 2018; 2:00 pm, ESPN3		at North Dakota State	L 64–82	7–13 (3–2)	Scheels Center (3,625); Fargo, ND
Jan 17, 2018; 7:00 pm, ESPN3		at South Dakota	L 70–82	7–14 (3–3)	Sanford Coyote Sports Center (2,351); Vermillion, SD
Jan 20, 2018; 7:00 pm, ESPN3		Denver	L 64–73	7–15 (3–4)	Mabee Center (5,023); Tulsa, OK
Jan 23, 2018*; 7:00 pm		East Texas Baptist	W 93–66	8–15	Mabee Center (2,036); Tulsa, OK
Jan 27, 2018*; 4:00 pm		Nebraska Christian	W 105–74	9–15	Mabee Center (2,442); Tulsa, OK
Feb 1, 2018; 6:00 pm		at Fort Wayne	L 75–85	9–16 (3–5)	Memorial Coliseum (1,481); Fort Wayne, IN
Feb 3, 2018; 2:00 pm, ESPN3		at Western Illinois	L 56–82	9–17 (3–6)	Western Hall (712); Macomb, IL
Feb 8, 2018; 7:00 pm, ESPN3		North Dakota State	W 67–66 ^{OT}	10–17 (4–6)	Mabee Center (2,366); Tulsa, OK
Feb 10, 2018; 7:00 pm, ESPN3		South Dakota State	L 75–85	10–18 (4–7)	Mabee Center (2,568); Tulsa, OK
Feb 14, 2018; 7:00 pm, ESPN3		South Dakota	L 67–85	10–19 (4–8)	Mabee Center (2,027); Tulsa, OK
Feb 18, 2018; 2:00 pm, ALT2		at Denver	L 65–66	10–20 (4–9)	Magness Arena (1,247); Denver, CO
Feb 22, 2018; 7:00 pm		at Omaha	W 83–75	11–20 (5–9)	Baxter Arena (1,899); Omaha, NE
Summit League tournament
Mar 4, 2018; 8:30 pm, ESPN3	(6)	vs. (3) Denver; Quarterfinals	L 88–90 ^{2OT}	11–21	Premier Center (5,692); Sioux Falls, SD
*Non-conference game. ^{#}Rankings from AP Poll. (#) Tournament seedings in parentheses. All times are in Central Time Source.
