= 2017–18 South Dakota State Jackrabbits men's basketball team =

American college basketball season

2017–18 South Dakota State Jackrabbits men's basketball

Summit League regular season and tournament champions

NCAA tournament, First Round
- Conference: Summit League
- Record: 28–7 (13–1 The Summit)
- Head coach: T. J. Otzelberger (2nd season)
- Assistant coaches: Eric Henderson; Rob Klinkefus; Ben Walker
- Home arena: Frost Arena

2017–18 Summit League men's basketball standings
	Conf.				Overall
Team	W		L	PCT	W		L	PCT
South Dakota State †	13	–	1	.929	28	–	7	.800
South Dakota	11	–	3	.786	26	–	9	.743
Denver	8	–	6	.571	15	–	15	.500
Fort Wayne	7	–	7	.500	18	–	15	.545
North Dakota State	5	–	9	.357	15	–	17	.469
Oral Roberts	5	–	9	.357	11	–	21	.344
Omaha	4	–	10	.286	9	–	22	.290
Western Illinois	3	–	11	.214	12	–	16	.429
† 2018 Summit League Tournament winner

The 2017–18 South Dakota State Jackrabbits men's basketball team represented South Dakota State University during the 2017–18 NCAA Division I men's basketball season. The Jackrabbits, led by second-year head coach T. J. Otzelberger, played their home games at Frost Arena in Brookings, South Dakota as members of the Summit League. They finished the season 28–7, 13–1 in Summit League play to win the Summit League regular season championship. In the Summit League tournament, they defeated Western Illinois, North Dakota State, and South Dakota to become Summit League Tournament champions. They received the Summit League's automatic bid to the NCAA tournament where they lost in the first round to Ohio State.

== Previous season ==
The Jackrabbits finished the 2016–17 season 18–17, 8–8 in Summit League play to finish in a three-way tie for fourth place. As the No. 4 seed in the Summit League tournament, they defeated Denver, South Dakota, and Omaha to win the tournament championship. As a result, they earned the league's automatic bid to the NCAA tournament. As the No. 16 seed in the West region, they lost in the first round to Gonzaga.

== Preseason ==
In a poll of league coaches, media, and sports information directors, the Jackrabbits were picked to win the Summit League. Junior forward Mike Daum was named the preseason Summit League Player of the Year. Senior forward Reed Tellinghuisen was named to the preseason All-Summit League Second Team.

== Roster ==
2017–18 South Dakota State Jackrabbits men's basketball team
Players
Coaches

Pos.	#	Name	Height	Weight	Year	Hometown
PG	0	Brandon Key	5 ft 10 in (1.78 m)	180 lb (82 kg)	Jr	Milwaukee, Wisconsin
G	1	Skyler Flatten	6 ft 5 in (1.96 m)	215 lb (98 kg)	Sr	Clark, South Dakota
G	2	Tevin King	6 ft 2 in (1.88 m)	200 lb (91 kg)	Jr	Chicago, Illinois
G	3	Chris Howell	6 ft 5 in (1.96 m)	217 lb (98 kg)	Jr	Milwaukee, Wisconsin
G/F	4	Ryan Kreuger	6 ft 6 in (1.98 m)	200 lb (91 kg)	Fr	Hortonville, Wisconsin
G	5	David Jenkins	6 ft 2 in (1.88 m)	190 lb (86 kg)	Fr	Tacoma, Washington
F	10	Alou Dillon	6 ft 8 in (2.03 m)	225 lb (102 kg)	Fr	Wauwatosa, Wisconsin
F	11	Dallas Polk-Hilliard	6 ft 6 in (1.98 m)	200 lb (91 kg)	Jr	Milwaukee, Wisconsin
G	15	Beau Brown	6 ft 1 in (1.85 m)	175 lb (79 kg)	So	Mitchell, South Dakota
G/F	23	Reed Tellinghuisen	6 ft 7 in (2.01 m)	215 lb (98 kg)	Sr	Sac City, Iowa
F	24	Mike Daum	6 ft 9 in (2.06 m)	250 lb (113 kg)	Jr	Kimball, Nebraska
G/F	25	Lane Severyn	6 ft 5 in (1.96 m)	220 lb (100 kg)	Sr	Pierre, South Dakota
G/F	32	Matt Dentlinger	6 ft 8 in (2.03 m)	250 lb (113 kg)	Fr	Carroll, Iowa
G	34	Alex Arians	6 ft 4 in (1.93 m)	190 lb (86 kg)	Fr	Madison, Wisconsin
F	45	Ian Theisen	6 ft 9 in (2.06 m)	240 lb (109 kg)	Sr	Osseo, Minnesota

Head coach

- T. J. Otzelberger (UW–Whitewater)

Assistant coach(es)

- Rob Klinkefus (Buena Vista)
- Eric Henderson (Wayne State (NE))
- Ben Walker (Creighton)

Legend

- (C) Team captain
- (S) Suspended
- (I) Ineligible
- (W) Walk-on
- Injured
- Current redshirt

Roster
Last update: Sep 13, 2017

== Schedule and results ==
Date time, TV	Rank^{#}	Opponent^{#}	Result	Record	Site (attendance) city, state
Exhibition
Nov 2, 2017; 8:15 pm		South Dakota Mines; Hurricane Relief Charity Exhibition	W 78–65		Frost Arena (2,080); Brookings, SD
Non-conference regular season
Nov 10, 2017*; 8:15 pm		UC Irvine	W 65–54	1–0	Frost Arena (2,669); Brookings, SD
Nov 12, 2017*; 2:00 pm		Mary	W 78–54	2–0	Frost Arena (1,248); Brookings, SD
Nov 14, 2017*; 7:00 pm		Alabama State	W 94–63	3–0	Frost Arena (1,887); Brookings, SD
Nov 17, 2017*; 7:00 pm, Jayhawk TV		at No. 4 Kansas	L 64–98	3–1	Allen Fieldhouse (16,300); Lawrence, KS
Nov 20, 2017*; 1:30 pm		vs. Wyoming; Cayman Islands Classic first round	L 65–77	3–2	John Gray Gymnasium (900); George Town, Cayman Islands
Nov 21, 2017*; 11:00 am		vs. Iowa; Cayman Islands Classic consolation round	W 80–72	4–2	John Gray Gymnasium (1,275); George Town, Cayman Islands
Nov 22, 2017*; 1:30 pm		vs. Buffalo; Cayman Islands Classic 5th place game	W 94–80	5–2	John Gray Gymnasium (450); George Town, Cayman Islands
Nov 26, 2017*; 2:00 pm		Dakota State	W 92–60	6–2	Frost Arena (1,171); Brookings, SD
Nov 28, 2017*; 7:00 pm, SECN+		at Ole Miss	W 99–97 ^{OT}	7–2	The Pavilion at Ole Miss (6,014); Oxford, MS
Dec 2, 2017*; 7:00 pm, MidcSN/ESPN3		vs. Missouri State	L 53–73	7–3	Sanford Pentagon (2,001); Sioux Falls, SD
Dec 5, 2017*; 7:00 pm, Cox		at No. 6 Wichita State	L 85–95	7–4	Charles Koch Arena (10,506); Wichita, KS
Dec 8, 2017*; 5:30 pm		Concordia (NE)	W 103–67	8–4	Frost Arena (2,105); Brookings, SD
Dec 12, 2017*; 7:00 pm, MidcoSN/ESPN3		North Dakota	W 99–63	9–4	Frost Arena (1,874); Brookings, SD
Dec 15, 2017*; 7:00 pm, P12N		at Colorado	L 103–112 ^{2OT}	9–5	Coors Events Center (6,933); Boulder, CO
Dec 19, 2017*; 7:00 pm		Drake	W 87–74	10–5	Frost Arena (1,525); Brookings, SD
Dec 22, 2017*; 6:00 pm		at UMKC	W 85–60	11–5	Municipal Auditorium (1,203); Kansas City, MO
Dec 30, 2017*; 2:00 pm		Presentation	W 111–68	12–5	Frost Arena (1,129); Brookings, SD
Summit League regular season
Jan 3, 2018; 7:00 pm, MidcoSN/ESPN3		at North Dakota State	W 87–80	13–5 (1–0)	Scheels Arena (3,182); Fargo, ND
Jan 6, 2018; 7:00 pm		at Omaha	W 101–88	14–5 (2–0)	Baxter Arena (3,447); Omaha, NE
Jan 11, 2018; 7:00 pm, MidcoSN/ESPN3		Oral Roberts	W 78–75	15–5 (3–0)	Frost Arena (2,221); Brookings, SD
Jan 13, 2018; 2:00 pm		Denver	W 94–72	16–5 (4–0)	Frost Arena (2,793); Brookings, SD
Jan 20, 2018; 7:00 pm		at Western Illinois	W 98–70	17–5 (5–0)	Western Hall (841); Macomb, IL
Jan 24, 2018; 7:00 pm, MidcoSN/ESPN3		at South Dakota	L 68–87	17–6 (5–1)	Sanford Coyote Sports Center (5,004); Vermillion, SD
Jan 27, 2018; 4:15 pm, MidcoSN/ESPN3		Fort Wayne	W 78–76	18–6 (6–1)	Frost Arena (3,536); Brookings, SD
Jan 30, 2018; 7:00 pm, MidcoSN/ESPN3		Omaha	W 80–60	19–6 (7–1)	Frost Arena (1,837); Brookings, SD
Feb 1, 2018; 7:00 pm, MidcoSN/ESPN3		North Dakota State	W 82–63	20–6 (8–1)	Frost Arena (3,377); Brookings, SD
Feb 8, 2018; 8:00 pm, ALT2		at Denver	W 81–77	21–6 (9–1)	Magness Arena (1,555); Denver, CO
Feb 10, 2018; 7:00 pm, ESPN3		at Oral Roberts	W 85–75	22–6 (10–1)	Mabee Center (2,568); Tulsa, OK
Feb 17, 2018; 2:00 pm		Western Illinois	W 82–62	23–6 (11–1)	Frost Arena (2,873); Brookings, SD
Feb 22, 2018; 7:00 pm, MidcoSN/ESPN3		South Dakota	W 76–72	24–6 (12–1)	Frost Arena (4,138); Brookings, SD
Feb 24, 2018; 6:00 pm		at Fort Wayne	W 97–90	25–6 (13–1)	Hilliard Gates Sports Center (1824); Fort Wayne, IN
Summit League tournament
Mar 3, 2018; 6:00 pm, ESPN3	(1)	vs. (8) Western Illinois; Quarterfinals	W 66–60	26–6	Premier Center (10,771); Sioux Falls, SD
Mar 5, 2018; 6:00 pm, ESPN3	(1)	vs. (5) North Dakota State; Semifinals	W 78–57	27–6	Premier Center (8,835); Sioux Falls, SD
Mar 6, 2018; 8:00 pm, ESPN2	(1)	vs. (2) South Dakota; Championship	W 97–87	28–6	Premier Center (11,114); Sioux Falls, SD
NCAA tournament
Mar 15, 2018*; 3:00 pm, TNT	(12 W)	vs. (5 W) No. 17 Ohio State; First Round	L 73–81	28–7	Taco Bell Arena (11,662); Boise, ID
*Non-conference game. ^{#}Rankings from AP Poll. (#) Tournament seedings in parentheses. W=West Region. All times are in Central Time.
