= 2017–18 North Dakota State Bison men's basketball team =

American college basketball season

2017–18 North Dakota State Bison men's basketball

Sun Bowl Invitational champion
- Conference: Summit League
- Record: 15–17 (5–9 The Summit)
- Head coach: David Richman (4th season)
- Assistant coaches: Jayden Olson; Kyan Brown; Will Veasley
- Home arena: Scheels Center

2017–18 Summit League men's basketball standings
	Conf.				Overall
Team	W		L	PCT	W		L	PCT
South Dakota State †	13	–	1	.929	28	–	7	.800
South Dakota	11	–	3	.786	26	–	9	.743
Denver	8	–	6	.571	15	–	15	.500
Fort Wayne	7	–	7	.500	18	–	15	.545
North Dakota State	5	–	9	.357	15	–	17	.469
Oral Roberts	5	–	9	.357	11	–	21	.344
Omaha	4	–	10	.286	9	–	22	.290
Western Illinois	3	–	11	.214	12	–	16	.429
† 2018 Summit League Tournament winner

The 2017–18 North Dakota State Bison men's basketball team represented North Dakota State University in the 2017–18 NCAA Division I men's basketball season. The Bison, led by fourth-year head coach David Richman, played their home games at the Scheels Center in Fargo, North Dakota as members of the Summit League. They finished the season 15–17, 5–9 in Summit League play to finish in a tie for fifth place. They defeated Fort Wayne in the quarterfinals of the Summit League tournament before losing in the semifinals to South Dakota State.

== Previous season ==
The Bison finished the season 19–11, 11–5 in Summit League play to finish in second place. They were upset by IUPUI in the quarterfinals of the Summit League tournament.

== Preseason ==
In a poll of league coaches, media, and sports information directors, the Bison were picked to finish in third place. Senior guard Paul Miller was named to the preseason All-Summit First Team.

== Roster ==
2017–18 North Dakota State Bison men's basketball team
Players
Coaches

Pos.	#	Name	Height	Weight	Year	Hometown
G	2	Paul Miller	6 ft 6 in (1.98 m)	205 lb (93 kg)	Sr	Waukesha, Wisconsin
G	3	Tyree Eady	6 ft 5 in (1.96 m)	205 lb (93 kg)	Fr	Middleton, Wisconsin
G	5	Nnamdi Van Dulm	6 ft 4 in (1.93 m)	195 lb (88 kg)	So	West Allis, Wisconsin
G	11	Jared Samuelson	6 ft 2 in (1.88 m)	185 lb (84 kg)	So	Gretna, Nebraska
G	13	Chris Quayle	6 ft 5 in (1.96 m)	185 lb (84 kg)	So	Riverton, Wyoming
G/F	21	A.J. Jacobson	6 ft 6 in (1.98 m)	210 lb (95 kg)	Sr	Fargo, North Dakota
G	22	Cameron Hunter	6 ft 3 in (1.91 m)	180 lb (82 kg)	RS Fr	Olathe, Kansas
F	23	Deng Geu	6 ft 8 in (2.03 m)	210 lb (95 kg)	RS So	Sioux Falls, South Dakota
G	24	Tyson Ward	6 ft 6 in (1.98 m)	185 lb (84 kg)	So	Tampa, Florida
F	30	Spencer Eliason	6 ft 9 in (2.06 m)	240 lb (109 kg)	Jr	Chadron, Nebraska
G	33	Jake Mertens	6 ft 3 in (1.91 m)	190 lb (86 kg)	Fr	Devils Lake, North Dakota
F	34	Rocky Kreuser	6 ft 9 in (2.06 m)	230 lb (104 kg)	Fr	White Bear Lake, Minnesota
F	42	Dylan Miller	6 ft 8 in (2.03 m)	230 lb (104 kg)	Jr	Panama, Illinois
C	44	Jordan Meidinger	7 ft 0 in (2.13 m)	220 lb (100 kg)	Fr	Dickinson, North Dakota

Head coach

- David Richman (North Dakota State)

Assistant coach(es)

- Jayden Olson (Dickinson State)
- Kyan Brown (Oral Roberts)
- Will Veasley (Butler)

Legend

- (C) Team captain
- (S) Suspended
- (I) Ineligible
- (W) Walk-on
- Injured
- Current redshirt

Roster
Last update: October 26, 2017

== Schedule and results ==
Date time, TV	Rank^{#}	Opponent^{#}	Result	Record	Site (attendance) city, state
Exhibition
Nov 1, 2017*; 7:00 pm, MidcoSN		Concordia Moorhead	W 95–46		Scheels Center (1,103); Fargo, ND
Regular season
Nov 11, 2017*; 3:00 pm		at UC Santa Barbara	L 66–85	0–1	The Thunderdome (1,892); Santa Barbara, CA
Nov 13, 2017*; 10:00 pm, P12N		at No. 10 USC	L 65–75	0–2	Galen Center (2,402); Los Angeles, CA
Nov 17, 2017*; 7:00 pm, ESPN3		at Missouri State	W 57–54	1–2	JQH Arena (4,703); Springfield, MO
Nov 22, 2017*; 7:00 pm, MidcoSN/ESPN3		Florida A&M; Hoops in the Heartland	W 80–66	2–2	Scheels Center (2,723); Fargo, ND
Nov 25, 2017*; 7:00 pm, MidcoSN2/ESPN3		Stetson; Hoops in the Heartland	W 94–58	3–2	Scheels Center (2,532); Fargo, ND
Nov 28, 2017*; 7:30 pm, ESPN3		at Stephen F. Austin; Hoops in the Heartland	L 50–54	3–3	William R. Johnson Coliseum (4,398); Nacogdoches, TX
Nov 30, 2017*; 6:00 pm, SECN		at Mississippi State; Hoops in the Heartland	L 59–83	3–4	Humphrey Coliseum (5,831); Starkville, MS
Dec 4, 2017*; 7:00 pm, MidcoSN/ESPN3		Missouri State	L 58–71	3–5	Scheels Center (1,704); Fargo, ND
Dec 9, 2017*; 7:00 pm, MidcoSN		at North Dakota	W 88–79	4–5	Betty Engelstad Sioux Center; Grand Forks, ND
Dec 12, 2017*; 7:00 pm, MidcoSN2/ESPN3		Valley City State	W 101–58	5–5	Scheels Center (1,661); Fargo, ND
Dec 18, 2017*; 8:00 pm, P12N		at No. 18 Arizona	L 53–83	5–6	McKale Center (14,048); Tucson, AZ
Dec 21, 2017*; 6:00 pm		vs. UNC Wilmington; Sun Bowl Invitational semifinals	W 100–63	6–6	Don Haskins Center (6,013); El Paso, TX
Dec 22, 2017*; 8:00 pm		vs. UTEP; Sun Bowl Invitational championship	W 63–51	7–6	Don Haskins Center (8,021); El Paso, TX
Dec 30, 2017*; 2:00 pm, MidcoSN/ESPN3		Jamestown	W 99–50	8–6	Scheels Center (1,842); Fargo, ND
Jan 3, 2018; 7:00 pm, MidcoSN/ESPN3		South Dakota State	L 80–87	8–7 (0–1)	Scheels Center (3,182); Fargo, ND
Jan 6, 2018; 1:00 pm, MidcoSN/ESPN3		at South Dakota	W 84–79	9–7 (1–1)	Sanford Coyote Sports Center (2,206); Vermillion, SD
Jan 11, 2018; 7:00 pm, MidcoSN/ESPN3		Denver	L 61–67	9–8 (1–2)	Scheels Center (2,543); Fargo, ND
Jan 13, 2018; 2:00 pm, MidcoSN/ESPN3		Oral Roberts	W 82–64	10–8 (2–2)	Scheels Center (3,625); Fargo, ND
Jan 16, 2018*; 7:00 pm, MidcoSN/ESPN3		North Dakota	L 77–86	10–9	Scheels Center (4,105); Fargo, ND
Jan 20, 2018; 12:00 pm		at Fort Wayne	L 88–92	10–10 (2–3)	Memorial Coliseum (2,036); Fort Wayne, IN
Jan 25, 2018; 7:00 pm, MidcoSN2/ESPN3		Omaha	W 73–58	11–10 (3–3)	Scheels Center (2,507); Fargo, ND
Jan 27, 2018; 2:00 pm, MidcoSN2/ESPN3		Western Illinois	W 80–69	12–10 (4–3)	Scheels Center (3,187); Fargo, ND
Feb 1, 2018; 7:00 pm, MidcoSN/ESPN3		at South Dakota State	L 63–82	12–11 (4–4)	Frost Arena (3,377); Brookings, SD
Feb 3, 2018; 2:00 pm, MidcoSN/ESPN3		South Dakota	L 72–76	12–12 (4–5)	Scheels Center (3,722); Fargo, ND
Feb 8, 2018; 7:00 pm, ESPN3		at Oral Roberts	L 66–67 ^{OT}	12–13 (4–6)	Mabee Center (2,366); Tulsa, OK
Feb 10, 2018; 7:00 pm, ALT		at Denver	L 63–66	12–14 (4–7)	Magness Arena (1,568); Denver, CO
Feb 13, 2018*; 7:00 pm, MidcoSN/ESPN3		Mayville State	W 87–53	13–14	Scheels Center (1,920); Fargo, ND
Feb 17, 2018; 2:00 pm, MidcoSN2/ESPN3		Fort Wayne	L 72–84	13–15 (4–8)	Scheels Center (3,348); Fargo, ND
Feb 22, 2018; 7:00 pm		at Western Illinois	L 74–82	13–16 (4–9)	Western Hall (641); Macomb, IL
Feb 24, 2018; 1:00 pm, YurView		at Omaha	W 84–62	14–16 (5–9)	Baxter Arena (2,467); Omaha, NE
The Summit League tournament
Mar 4, 2018; 6:00 pm, ESPN3	(5)	vs. (4) Fort Wayne; Quarterfinals	W 86–82	15–16	Premier Center (5,692); Sioux Falls, SD
Mar 5, 2018; 6:00 pm, ESPN3	(5)	vs. (1) South Dakota State; Semifinals	L 57–78	15–17	Premier Center (8,835); Sioux Falls, SD
*Non-conference game. ^{#}Rankings from AP Poll. (#) Tournament seedings in parentheses. All times are in Central Time.
