= Yemi Nicholson =

American basketball player

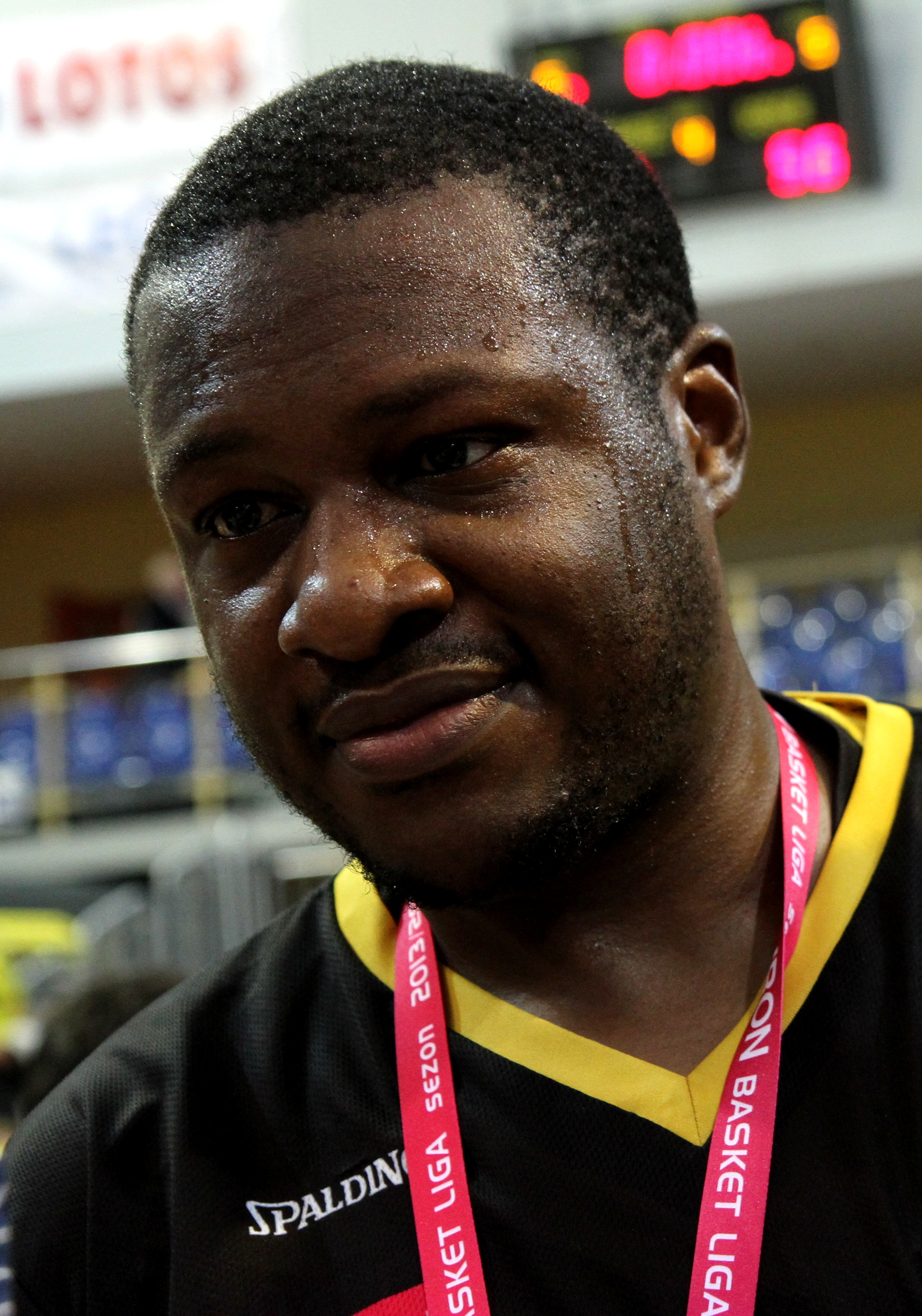
- Nicholson with Trefl Sopot in 2014

Personal information
- Born: June 7, 1983 (age 43) Oregon, U.S.
- Listed height: 6 ft 11 in (2.11 m)
- Listed weight: 260 lb (118 kg)

Career information
- High school: Overland (Aurora, Colorado)
- College: Fort Lewis (2001–2002); Denver (2003–2006)
- NBA draft: 2006: undrafted
- Playing career: 2006–2014
- Position: Center

Career history
- 2006–2007: Belfius Mons-Hainaut
- 2007: Villa de Los Barrios
- 2008: Austin Toros
- 2008–2009: Eisbären Bremerhaven
- 2010–2012: Prostějov
- 2012–2013: Czarni Słupsk
- 2013–2014: Trefl Sopot

Career highlights
- Sun Belt Player of the Year (2005); 2× First-team All-Sun Belt (2005, 2006); Sun Belt Defensive Player of the Year (2006)

Bertengeh O. "Yemi" Gadri-Nicholson (born June 7, 1983) is an American former professional basketball player. He played college basketball for the Denver Pioneers.

== Early life ==
Nicholson was born in Oregon to parents who had immigrated from Sierra Leone. He lived in Texas before moving to Colorado in 1994 where he attended Overland High School. Nicholson almost failed to make his high school basketball team and instead possessed greater abilities as a saxophone player. He earned a scholarship to study music at Fort Lewis College.

== College career ==
Nicholson grew from 6 ft 4 in (1.93 m) to 6 ft 10 in (2.08 m) during his freshman year at Fort Lewis and his father encouraged him to try playing basketball again. He walked-on the Fort Lewis basketball team midway through his freshman year and played for three minutes in one game during the 2001–02 season.

Nicholson was playing a pickup game in Denver, Colorado, in 2002 when he was noticed by Denver Pioneers player Rodney Billups. Billups recommended Nicholson to Pioneers head coach Terry Carroll who invited Nicholson to join the team. Nicholson sat out the 2002–03 season as a redshirt.

Nicholson had a paltry debut with the Pioneers during the 2003–04 season and averaged 7.5 points and 4.3 rebounds per game. He had a breakthrough season in 2004–05 as he averaged 18.1 points and 8.4 rebounds per game. Nicholson was named as the 2005 Sun Belt Player of the Year. He received frequent attention of National Basketball Association (NBA) scouts during his senior season in 2005–06. Nicholson averaged a league-best 19.8 points per game and was selected as the 2006 Sun Belt Defensive Player of the Year.

== Professional career ==
Nicholson participated at the 2006 NBA Pre-Draft Camp. He was not selected in the 2006 NBA draft and joined the Sacramento Kings for the 2006 NBA Summer League where he played sparingly.

Nicholson began his professional career with Belfius Mons-Hainaut in Belgium in the 2006–07 season. He played for the Austin Toros during the 2007–08 season where he averaged 2.3 points and 1.0 rebounds per game. Nicholson also played in Poland, Germany, Spain and the Czech Republic.

== Post-playing career ==
Nicholson lives in Denver with his wife and two sons. He operates a recording studio named Yemi's Studio.
