= Jake Pemberton =

American-Israeli basketball player

Jake Pemberton ג'ייק פמברטון
No. 5 – Maccabi Ra'anana
- Position: Shooting guard
- League: Israeli National League

Personal information
- Born: January 12, 1996 (age 30)
- Listed height: 6 ft 4 in (1.93 m)
- Listed weight: 190 lb (86 kg)

Career information
- High school: Mountain Vista (Highlands Ranch, Colorado)
- College: Denver (2014–2018)
- NBA draft: 2018: undrafted
- Playing career: 2018–present

Career history
- 2018–2019: Maccabi Ashdod
- 2019–2020: Hapoel Haifa
- 2020–present: Maccabi Ra'anana

Jake Pemberton (Hebrew: ג'ייק פמברטון; born January 12, 1996) is an American-Israeli professional basketball player for Maccabi Ra'anana of the Israeli National League. He played college basketball for the University of Denver. Standing at 6 ft 4 in (1.93 m), Pemberton plays at the shooting guard position.

== Early life and college career ==
Pemberton's hometown is Highlands Ranch, Colorado, and he attended Mountain Vista High School in Highlands Ranch, Colorado, where he was named first team All-State as a senior. He led Mountain Vista H.S. to the Final Four in the Colorado State Tournament in 2014. Pemberton was named First Team All-Conference in 2014.

Pemberton played four years for the University of Denver's Pioneers under head coaches Joe Scott and Rodney Billups. On January 25, 2017, Pemberton recorded a college career-high 25 points, shooting 5-of-7 from three-point range, along with five rebounds and four assists in a 91–82 win over South Dakota State.

In his senior year at Denver, Pemberton averaged 11.1 points, 3.3 rebounds, 2.8 assists, shooting 45.2 percent from three-point range - good for second in the entire Summit League. He was named a Summit Academic All-League selection.

== Professional career ==
On July 16, 2018, Pemberton started his professional career with Maccabi Ashdod of the Israeli Premier League, signing a one-year deal. On February 17, 2019, Pemberton recorded a career-high 24 points, shooting 6-of-8 from three-point range, along with four rebounds, two assists and three steals in a 93–74 win over Ironi Nahariya. He was subsequently named Israeli League Round 18 MVP.

On August 3, 2019, Pemberton signed a one-year deal with Hapoel Haifa of the Israeli National League. He appeared in nine games for Haifa, averaging 3 points in 12.2 minutes per game. On January 29, 2020, Pemberton parted ways with Haifa to join Maccabi Ra'anana for the rest of the season.
