= Dave Bustion =

American basketball player

Personal information
- Born: August 30, 1949 (age 76) Gadsden, Alabama, U.S.
- Listed height: 6 ft 8 in (2.03 m)
- Listed weight: 215 lb (98 kg)

Career information
- High school: Carver (Gadsden, Alabama)
- College: Northeastern JC (1969–1970); Denver (1970–1972)
- NBA draft: 1972: 5th round, 68th overall pick
- Drafted by: Kansas City–Omaha Kings
- Playing career: 1972–1988
- Position: Power forward
- Number: 14

Career history
- 1972–1973: Denver Rockets
- 1974–1976: ASC Denain-Voltaire PH
- 1977–1978: Alsace de Bagnolet
- 1978–1979: Alsace de Bagnolet-Stade Français
- 1980–1982: Champel Geneva
- 1983–1984: ESL Vernier Geneva
- 1985–1988: Geneva Pâquis-Seujet
- Stats at Basketball Reference

David C. Bustion (born August 30, 1949), also known as Stretch, is an American former basketball player.

He played collegiately for the University of Denver.

He was selected by the Kansas City–Omaha Kings in the 5th round (68th pick overall) of the 1972 NBA draft.

He played for the Denver Rockets (1972–73) in the ABA.

After Bustion's stint in the ABA, he played professionally in France for Denain, Paris Bagnolet, Paris Bagnolet-Stade Français (Champion de France) where he served as player-coach for a time. He also played in Switzerland for Champel Geneva, ESL Vernier and finally Geneva Pâquis-Seujet.
