= Chris Udofia =

American basketball player (born 1992)

Personal information
- Born: July 18, 1992 (age 33) Irving, Texas, U.S.
- Listed height: 6 ft 6 in (1.98 m)
- Listed weight: 200 lb (91 kg)

Career information
- High school: Jesuit Dallas (Dallas, Texas)
- College: Denver (2010–2014)
- NBA draft: 2014: undrafted
- Playing career: 2014–2016
- Position: Small forward

Career history
- 2014–2015: Elitzur Yavne
- 2015–2016: Santa Cruz Warriors

Career highlights
- First-team All-Summit (2014); Summit Defensive Player of the Year (2014); First-team All-WAC (2013); WAC Defensive Player of the Year (2013); First-team All-Sun Belt (2012); Sun Belt Defensive Player of the Year (2012)
- Stats at Basketball Reference

Chris Udofia (born July 18, 1992) is an American former professional basketball player who last played for the Santa Cruz Warriors of the NBA Development League in 2015–16. He played college basketball for the University of Denver. Since retiring from basketball, Udofia has worked in various corporate jobs in the Dallas, Texas area.

== High school career ==
Udofia attended Jesuit Dallas High School where he led them to a 0–8173713 record and District 8-5A championship as a senior earning several awards, among them, the First Team All-Region as a senior and First Team All-District as both a junior and senior.

== College career ==
Udofia attended the University of Denver where he averaged 12.1 points, 4.9 rebounds, 2.8 assists, 2.06 blocks, 1.14 steals and 29.5 minutes in 124 games, finishing his career first in program history in blocked shots (256) and games played (124); fifth in points (1,501) and field goals made (551); seventh in assists (349), steals (141) and free throws made (334). He also was a three-time first-team all-conference selection in three different leagues.

== Professional career ==
After going undrafted in the 2014 NBA draft, Udofia joined the Houston Rockets for the 2014 NBA Summer League. On August 23, 2014, Udofia signed with Elitzur Yavne of the Israeli Liga Leumit where he averaged 10.8 points, 8.8 rebounds and 1.68 blocks in 27.8 minutes after playing in 28 games.

On October 19, 2015, Udofia signed with the Golden State Warriors. However, he was waived just four days later. On November 2, he was acquired by the Santa Cruz Warriors of the NBA Development League as an affiliate player of Golden State.

== Personal life ==
Udofia is the son of Theresa and Don Udofia. His father died in 2015 from cancer. He has two brothers, Don and Joseph and majored on Integrated Sciences with a focus in Biology with a minor in Psychology.
