= Rodney Billups =

American basketball coach (born 1983)

Denver Nuggets
- Title: Assistant coach
- League: NBA

Personal information
- Born: January 14, 1983 (age 43) Denver, Colorado, U.S.
- Listed height: 5 ft 10 in (1.78 m)
- Listed weight: 165 lb (75 kg)

Career information
- High school: George Washington (Denver, Colorado)
- College: Los Angeles Valley (2001–2002); Denver (2002–2005)
- NBA draft: 2005: undrafted
- Playing career: 2005–2006
- Position: Guard
- Number: 4, 1
- Coaching career: 2012–present

Career history

Playing
- 2005–2006: BK Riga
- 2006: Kouvot

Coaching
- 2012–2016: Colorado (assistant)
- 2016–2021: Denver
- 2022–2024: Portland Trail Blazers (assistant)
- 2025–present: Denver Nuggets (assistant)

Rodney Dee Billups (born January 14, 1983) is an American professional basketball coach who is an assistant coach for the Denver Nuggets. He is the younger brother of former NBA star Chauncey Billups.

== Career ==
=== Playing ===
Billups played at the University of Denver from 2002 to 2005. After college, he played professionally with BK Riga of the Latvian Basketball League and Kouvot of the Finnish Korisliiga before turning his attention to coaching. The Colorado 14ers selected Billups in the ninth round of the 2006 NBA Development League draft.

=== Coaching ===
Billups had been an assistant at Colorado from 2012 to 2016. Billups was the head coach of his alma mater, the University of Denver. He was named head coach on March 14, 2016, three days after Joe Scott was fired.

On July 1, 2025, the Denver Nuggets of the NBA hired Billups to serve as an assistant coach under head coach David Adelman.

== Head coaching record ==
Record table
Season	Team	Overall	Conference	Standing	Postseason
Denver Pioneers (The Summit League) (2016–2021)
2016–17	Denver	16–14	8–8	T–4th	
2017–18	Denver	15–15	8–6	3rd	
2018–19	Denver	8–22	3–13	9th	
2019–20	Denver	7–24	3–13	8th	
2020–21	Denver	2–19	1–13	9th	
Denver:		48–94 (.338)	23–53 (.303)		
Total:		48–94 (.338)			
National champion Postseason invitational champion Conference regular season champion Conference regular season and conference tournament champion Division regular season champion Division regular season and conference tournament champion Conference tournament champion
