= Purdue Fort Wayne Mastodons men's basketball statistical leaders =

The Purdue Fort Wayne Mastodons men's basketball statistical leaders are individual statistical leaders of the Purdue Fort Wayne Mastodons men's basketball program in various categories, including points, three-pointers, assists, blocks, rebounds, and steals. Within those areas, the lists identify single-game, single-season, and career leaders. The Mastodons represent Purdue University Fort Wayne (PFW) in the NCAA Division I Horizon League.

PFW began operation on July 1, 2018 following the dissolution of Indiana University – Purdue University Fort Wayne (IPFW), which had been a joint campus of the Indiana University and Purdue University systems. IPFW's academic programs in health sciences were transferred to the new Indiana University Fort Wayne, with all other academic programs being taken over by PFW. The IPFW athletic program, branded as "IPFW" through 2015–16 and "Fort Wayne" in 2016–17 and 2017–18, was transferred in its entirety to PFW, adopting the current athletic branding of "Purdue Fort Wayne" at that time. The history of PFW men's basketball thus begins with IPFW's first season of intercollegiate competition in 1973–74.

A significant complication in statistical recording is that the Mastodons have been members of all three current NCAA divisions. IPFW was initially a member of NCAA Division III (coincidentally in the first season in which the NCAA adopted its current three-division alignment). The university moved to Division II effective with the 1982–83 season, and then to Division I starting in 2001–02.

In Division II, the NCAA did not officially record assists as a statistic until the 1988–89 season, and blocks and steals until the 1992–93 season (this was several years after the same statistics were recorded in D-I). (Note: Specifically, the NCAA recorded assists in 1950–51 and 1951–52, but halted that practice, not reinstating official recording of assists in D-I until 1983–84. The NCAA started recording blocks and steals in D-I in 1988–89.) While several conferences experimented with three-pointers earlier in the 1980s, official NCAA records for three-point shooting start for all divisions with the 1986–87 season, when use of the three-pointer was made mandatory throughout NCAA men's basketball with the distance being uniform throughout the sport.

PFW's record books for single-game performances only include performances in the program's D-I era, and season and career three-point records date only to the national adoption of the three-pointer. The PFW record books include leaders in all other statistical categories in all seasons, whether or not the NCAA officially recorded those statistics in the relevant seasons. These lists are updated through the Mastodons' loss to Detroit Mercy in the first round of the 2023 Horizon League tournament. Currently active players are indicated in bold; note that PFW is eligible to appear in secondary national tournaments in the 2022–23 season.

== Scoring ==
Career
Rk	Player	Points	Seasons
1	Jarred Godfrey	2,164	2018–19 2019–20 2020–21 2021–22 2022–23
2	John Konchar	2,065	2015–16 2016–17 2017–18 2018–19
3	Frank Gaines	1,841	2008–09 2009–10 2010–11 2011–12 2012–13
4	Sean Gibson	1,765	1989–90 1990–91 1991–92 1992–93
5	Mo Evans	1,522	2013–14 2014–15 2015–16 2016–17
6	Bruce Roland	1,477	1986–87 1987–88 1988–89
7	Nick Wise	1,450	1999–2000 2000–01 2001–02
8	Ben Botts	1,400	2007–08 2008–09 2009–10 2010–11
9	Kason Harrell	1,349	2015–16 2016–17 2017–18 2018–19
10	Bryson Scott	1,278	2015–16 2016–17 2017–18

Season
Rk	Player	Points	Season
1	Bryson Scott	746	2017–18
2	Bruce Roland	672	1987–88
3	Corey Hadnot II	654	2025–26
4	John Konchar	642	2018–19
5	Max Landis	638	2015–16
6	Frank Gaines	635	2011–12
7	Frank Gaines	632	2012–13
8	Sean Gibson	606	1992–93
9	Rickie Smith	604	1980–81
10	Jalen Jackson	596	2024–25

Single game
Rk	Player	Points	Season	Opponent
1	Max Landis	44	2015–16	South Dakota
2	Jarred Godfrey	41	2020–21	UIC
3	John Konchar	38	2018–19	North Dakota State
	Jalen Jackson	38	2024–25	IU Indianapolis
5	Max Landis	37	2015–16	Omaha
6	Terry Collins	36	2002–03	UC Irvine
7	Tyler Best	35	2005–06	Longwood
	Jarred Godfrey	35	2021–22	Western Michigan
9	Jim Kesserich	34	2002–03	Aquinas
	Bryson Scott	34	2017–18	Detroit Mercy
	Bryson Scott	34	2017–18	Stetson
	Mikale Stevenson	34	2025–26	Milwaukee

== Three-pointers ==
Career
Rk	Player	3FG	Seasons
1	Mo Evans	266	2013–14 2014–15 2015–16 2016–17
2	Jarred Godfrey	261	2018–19 2019–20 2020–21 2021–22 2022–23
3	Nick Wise	246	1999–2000 2000–01 2001–02
4	Ben Botts	237	2007–08 2008–09 2009–10 2010–11
5	Kason Harrell	234	2015–16 2016–17 2017–18 2018–19
6	DeWitt Scott	210	2005–06 2006–07 2007–08
	Quinton Morton-Robertson	210	2022–23 2023–24 2024–25
	Maximus Nelson	210	2023–24 2024–25 2025–26
9	Deonte Billups	198	2019–20 2020–21 2021–22 2022–23
10	John Konchar	193	2015–16 2016–17 2017–18 2018–19

Season
Rk	Player	3FG	Season
1	Max Landis	125	2015–16
2	Quinton Morton-Robertson	105	2023–24
3	Mo Evans	100	2016–17
4	Nick Wise	98	2001–02
5	Nick Wise	93	2000–01
6	Kason Harrell	89	2017–18
7	Matt Holba	81	2018–19
8	Kason Harrell	78	2016–17
9	Bobby Planutis	77	2022–23
10	Eric Wilson	76	1986–87

Single game
Rk	Player	3FG	Season	Opponent
1	Max Landis	11	2015–16	South Dakota
2	Terry Collins	9	2002–03	UC Irvine
	Max Landis	9	2015–16	Austin Peay
	Max Landis	9	2015–16	Omaha
5	DeWitt Scott	8	2006–07	Rochester College
	Ben Botts	8	2010–11	Centenary
	Quinton Morton-Robertson	8	2022–23	Manchester
8	7 times by 7 players	7	Most recent: Deonte Billups, 2022-23 vs. IUPUI	

== Rebounds ==
Career
Rk	Player	Rebounds	Seasons
1	John Konchar	1,150	2015–16 2016–17 2017–18 2018–19
2	Sean Gibson	965	1989–90 1990–91 1991–92 1992–93
3	Jarred Godfrey	650	2018–19 2019–20 2020–21 2021–22 2022–23
4	David Simon	623	2002–03 2003–04 2004–05
5	Jim Morlan	606	1983–84 1984–85 1985–86 1986–87
6	Joe Reed	602	2012–13 2013–14 2014–15 2015–16
7	Frank Gaines	561	2008–09 2009–10 2010–11 2011–12 2012–13
8	RA Kpedi	540	2020–21 2021–22 2022–23
9	Richard Ivy	502	1984–85 1985–86 1986–87 1987–88
10	Bruce Roland	491	1986–87 1987–88 1988–89
	Eric Mulder	491	2022–23 2023–24 2024–25

Season
Rk	Player	Rebounds	Season
1	John Konchar	313	2015–16
2	Rickie Smith	301	1980–81
3	John Konchar	288	2016–17
4	John Konchar	282	2018–19
5	Sean Gibson	279	1992–93
6	David Simon	275	2003–04
7	Sean Gibson	274	1990–91
8	John Konchar	267	2017–18
9	Clifford Todd	265	1979–80
10	Deilvez Yearby	262	2009–10

Single game
Rk	Player	Rebounds	Season	Opponent
1	Quintin Butler	19	2004–05	Savannah State
	John Konchar	19	2018–19	North Dakota State
3	David Simon	18	2003–04	Florida Gulf Coast
	John Konchar	18	2018–19	San Diego State
5	David Simon	17	2003–04	Youngstown State
	Tyler Best	17	2006–07	Western Illinois
7	David Simon	16	2003–04	IUPUI
	David Simon	16	2004–05	UT Pan American
	John Konchar	16	2018–19	South Dakota
	John Konchar	16	2018–19	Omaha
	John Konchar	16	2017–18	UIC
	Chandler Cuthrell	16	2024–25	Wright State

== Assists ==
Career
Rk	Player	Assists	Seasons
1	Lawrence Jordan	913	1985–86 1987–88 1988–89 1989–90
2	John Konchar	554	2015–16 2016–17 2017–18 2018–19
3	Jarred Godfrey	478	2018–19 2019–20 2020–21 2021–22 2022–23
4	Mo Evans	466	2013–14 2014–15 2015–16 2016–17
5	Randy Spicer	433	1996–97 1997–98 1998–99 1999–2000
6	DeAngelo Woodall	401	1999–2000 2000–01 2001–02 2002–03
7	Zach Plackemeier	362	2007–08 2008–09 2009–10 2010–11
8	Andre Walton	306	1991–92 1992–93
9	Russ Marcinek	295	1992–93 1993–94 1994–95
10	Brad Noll	293	1999–2000 2000–01 2001–02 2002–03

Season
Rk	Player	Assists	Season
1	Lawrence Jordan	266	1989–90
2	Lawrence Jordan	260	1987–88
3	Lawrence Jordan	249	1988–89
4	Mo Evans	205	2016–17
5	John Konchar	179	2018–19
6	Andre Walton	176	1992–93
7	John Konchar	157	2017–18
8	Pierre Bland	154	2013–14
9	Rasheed Bello	153	2023–24
10	Randy Spicer	145	1998–99
	DeAngelo Woodall	145	2000–01

Single game
Rk	Player	Assists	Season	Opponent
1	John Konchar	14	2018–19	Denver
2	Mo Evans	13	2016–17	UMass Lowell
	Mo Evans	13	2016–17	Western Illinois
4	Demetrius Johnson	12	2007–08	UMKC
	Mo Evans	13	2016–17	Omaha
	Mo Evans	13	2016–17	Ball State
7	Jarred Godfrey	12	2020–21	Cleveland State
	Rasheed Bello	12	2024–25	Green Bay
9	Zach Plackemeier	11	2010–11	Chicago State
	Mo Evans	11	2015–16	Purdue North Central
	Mo Evans	11	2016–17	Austin Peay
	Mo Evans	11	2016–17	North Dakota State

== Steals ==
Career
Rk	Player	Steals	Seasons
1	Lawrence Jordan	324	1985–86 1987–88 1988–89 1989–90
2	John Konchar	272	2015–16 2016–17 2017–18 2018–19
3	Jarred Godfrey	217	2018–19 2019–20 2020–21 2021–22 2022–23
4	DeAngelo Woodall	213	1999–2000 2000–01 2001–02 2002–03
5	Bruce Roland	210	1986–87 1987–88 1988–89
6	Randy Spicer	148	1996–97 1997–98 1998–99 1999–2000
7	Mo Evans	146	2013–14 2014–15 2015–16 2016–17
8	Sean Gibson	137	1989–90 1990–91 1991–92 1992–93
9	Isaiah McCray	131	2011–12 2012–13 2013–14 2014–15
10	Frank Gaines	130	2008–09 2009–10 2010–11 2011–12 2012–13

Season
Rk	Player	Steals	Season
1	Lawrence Jordan	109	1989–90
2	Bruce Roland	94	1987–88
3	John Konchar	81	2017–18
4	Lawrence Jordan	78	1987–88
5	Lawrence Jordan	75	1988–89
6	Bruce Roland	71	1988–89
	John Konchar	71	2015–16
8	Rasheed Bello	67	2023–24
9	Steve Griffin	65	1999–00
	DeAngelo Woodall	65	2000–01
	Bryson Scott	65	2017–18
	John Konchar	65	2018–19

Single game
Rk	Player	Steals	Season	Opponent
1	Beau Bauer	7	2003–04	Maine
	John Konchar	7	2015–16	North Dakota State
	John Konchar	7	2018–19	Denver
	Rasheed Bello	7	2023–24	Northern Kentucky
5	14 times by 11 players	6	Most recent: Corey Hadnot II, 2025–26 vs. Ohio State	

== Blocks ==
Career
Rk	Player	Blocks	Seasons
1	David Simon	141	2002–03 2003–04 2004–05
2	Deilvez Yearby	130	2008–09 2009–10
3	Doug Reincke	113	1989–90 1990–91 1991–92 1992–93
4	Brent Calhoun	109	2012–13 2013–14 2014–15 2015–16 2016–17
5	Dylan Carl	107	2017–18 2018–19 2019–20 2020–21
6	Sean Gibson	94	1989–90 1990–91 1991–92 1992–93
7	John Konchar	78	2015–16 2016–17 2017–18 2018–19
8	Bruce Irwin	75	1985–86 1986–87
9	Jaraun Burrows	73	2006–07 2007–08
10	Kason Harrell	67	2015–16 2016–17 2017–18 2018–19

Season
Rk	Player	Blocks	Season
1	Deilvez Yearby	76	2009–10
2	David Simon	54	2003–04
	Deilvez Yearby	54	2008–09
4	Brent Calhoun	51	2016–17
5	David Simon	48	2004–05
6	Bruce Erwin	47	1985–86
	Jaraun Burrows	47	2007–08
8	Deangelo Elisee	41	2025–26
9	Rickie Smith	40	1980–81
	Brent Calhoun	40	2015–16

Single game
Rk	Player	Blocks	Season	Opponent
1	Deilvez Yearby	9	2009–10	UMKC
2	Deilvez Yearby	7	2008–09	Oral Roberts
	Deilvez Yearby	7	2009–10	SIU Edwardsville
4	8 times by 6 players	6	Most recent: Brent Calhoun, 2016–17 vs. Omaha	
