= 2019 NCAA Division I men's basketball tournament =

Edition of USA college basketball tournament

- Season: 2018–19
- Teams: 68
- Finals site: U.S. Bank Stadium, Minneapolis, Minnesota
- Champions: Virginia Cavaliers (1st title, 1st title game, 3rd Final Four)
- Runner-up: Texas Tech Red Raiders (1st title game, 1st Final Four)
- Semifinalists: Auburn Tigers (1st Final Four); Michigan State Spartans (10th Final Four)
- Winning coach: Tony Bennett (1st title)
- MOP: Kyle Guy (Virginia)
- Top scorer: Carsen Edwards (Purdue) (139 points)

The 2019 NCAA Division I men's basketball tournament involved 68 teams playing in a single-elimination tournament to determine the National Collegiate Athletic Association (NCAA) Division I men's basketball national champion for the 2018–19 season. The 81st annual edition of the tournament began on March 19, 2019, and concluded with the championship game on April 8, at U.S. Bank Stadium in Minneapolis, Minnesota, between the Texas Tech Red Raiders and the Virginia Cavaliers, with Virginia winning 85–77 in overtime.

Two schools made their first appearances in the tournament: Big South champion Gardner–Webb and Southland champion Abilene Christian.

For the first time since 2001 (also hosted in Minneapolis), no #8 seed survived the first round of the tournament. This was also the first time since the First Four was established in 2011 that no team in the First Four advanced past the first round of the tournament. (Note: This remains the only such instance in the men's tournament. However, the D-I women's tournament added its own First Four when it expanded to 68 teams in 2022, and no First Four winner in that tournament advanced beyond the first round.) This was the first Final Four since 2012 that did not include at least one team seeded #7 or lower. This would be the last Final Four until 2025 without any team seeded 8th or higher.

This tournament marked the first time that the Auburn Tigers of the Southeastern Conference and the Texas Tech Red Raiders of the Big 12 Conference made the Final Four. This also marked the third Final Four appearance for the Virginia Cavaliers of the Atlantic Coast Conference, but their first since 1984.

The championship game was the first time since 1979 to see two first-time participants playing in the championship, and the first since 2006 to have a first-time national champion. As a result of a worldwide COVID-19 pandemic that started in late 2019 and subsequently forced the cancellation of the 2020 tournament, this would be the last tournament held until 2021, and this would be also the last tournament held across the United States until 2022.

Carsen Edwards of Purdue was the leading scorer, with 139 points in only 4 games—producing an average of 34.8 points per game. Edwards also set the record for most made three-point shots in a tournament, with 28. The previous record holder, Glen Rice of Michigan in 1989, made 27, but did so in 6 games.

In the previous year's tournament, Virginia had infamously become the first No. 1 seed to lose to a No. 16 seed. At the conclusion of this year's title game, CBS announcer Jim Nantz dubbed Virginia's win the "all-time turnaround title."

== Tournament procedure ==
A total of 68 teams entered the 2019 tournament. Thirty-two automatic bids were awarded to each program that won their conference's tournament. The remaining 36 bids were "at-large", with selections extended by the NCAA Selection Committee.

Eight teams (the four lowest-seeded automatic qualifiers and the four lowest-seeded at-large teams) played in the First Four (the successor to what had been popularly known as "play-in games" through the 2010 tournament). The winners of these games advanced to the main draw of the tournament.

The Selection Committee seeded the entire field from 1 to 68.

The selections and seedings were completed and revealed on Sunday, March 17.

== Schedule and venues ==
2019 First Four (orange) and first and second rounds (green)
2019 Regionals (blue) and Final Four (red)

The following are the sites that were selected to host each round of the 2019 tournament:

First Four

- March 19 and 20
  - University of Dayton Arena, Dayton, Ohio (Host: University of Dayton)

First and second rounds (Subregionals)

- March 21 and 23
  - XL Center, Hartford, Connecticut (Host: University of Connecticut)
  - Wells Fargo Arena, Des Moines, Iowa (Host: Drake University)
  - VyStar Veterans Memorial Arena, Jacksonville, Florida (Host: Jacksonville University)
  - Vivint Smart Home Arena, Salt Lake City, Utah (Host: University of Utah)
- March 22 and 24
  - Colonial Life Arena, Columbia, South Carolina (Host: University of South Carolina)
  - Nationwide Arena, Columbus, Ohio (Host: Ohio State University)
  - BOK Center, Tulsa, Oklahoma (Host: University of Tulsa)
  - SAP Center, San Jose, California (Host: West Coast Conference)

Regional semifinals and finals (Sweet Sixteen and Elite Eight)

- March 28 and 30
  - West Regional, Honda Center, Anaheim, California (Host: Big West Conference)
  - South Regional, KFC Yum! Center, Louisville, Kentucky (Host: University of Louisville)
- March 29 and 31
  - East Regional, Capital One Arena, Washington, D.C. (Host: Georgetown University)
  - Midwest Regional, Sprint Center, Kansas City, Missouri (Host: Missouri Valley Conference)

National semifinals and championship (Final Four and championship)

- April 6 and 8
  - U.S. Bank Stadium, Minneapolis, Minnesota (Host: University of Minnesota)

U.S. Bank Stadium became the 40th venue to host the Final Four. This was the first hosting of the event at the facility, built on the former site of the Hubert H. Humphrey Metrodome, a two-time host in 1992 and 2001. The tournament returned to Hartford's XL Center for the first time since 1998. For the first time since 1970, the tournament returned to Columbia, South Carolina, with games played at the Colonial Life Arena.

== Qualification and selection ==
Four teams, out of 353 in Division I, were ineligible to participate in the 2019 tournament; Alabama A&M and Florida A&M failed to meet APR requirements, while California Baptist and North Alabama are amidst reclassification from Division II.

=== Automatic qualifiers ===
Conference	Team	Record	Appearance	Last bid
ACC	Duke	29–5	43rd	2018
America East	Vermont	27–6	7th	2017
American	Cincinnati	28–6	33rd	2018
ASUN	Liberty	28–6	4th	2013
Atlantic 10	Saint Louis	23–12	10th	2014
Big 12	Iowa State	23–11	20th	2017
Big East	Villanova	25–9	39th	2018
Big Sky	Montana	26–8	12th	2018
Big South	Gardner–Webb	23–11	1st	Never
Big Ten	Michigan State	28–6	33rd	2018
Big West	UC Irvine	30–5	2nd	2015
Colonial	Northeastern	23–10	9th	2015
C-USA	Old Dominion	26–8	12th	2011
Horizon	Northern Kentucky	26–8	2nd	2017
Ivy League	Yale	22–7	5th	2016
MAAC	Iona	17–15	14th	2018
MAC	Buffalo	31–3	4th	2018
MEAC	North Carolina Central	18–15	4th	2018
Missouri Valley	Bradley	20–14	9th	2006
Mountain West	Utah State	28–6	20th	2011
NEC	Fairleigh Dickinson	20–13	6th	2016
Ohio Valley	Murray State	27–4	17th	2018
Pac-12	Oregon	23–12	16th	2017
Patriot	Colgate	24–10	3rd	1996
SEC	Auburn	26–9	10th	2018
Southern	Wofford	29–4	5th	2015
Southland	Abilene Christian	27–6	1st	Never
SWAC	Prairie View A&M	22–12	2nd	1998
Summit League	North Dakota State	18–15	4th	2015
Sun Belt	Georgia State	24–9	5th	2018
WAC	New Mexico State	30–4	25th	2018
West Coast	Saint Mary's	22–11	10th	2017

=== Tournament seeds ===
The tournament seeds and regions were determined through the NCAA basketball tournament selection process.

East Regional – Capital One Arena, Washington, D.C.
Seed	School	Conference	Record	Overall seed	Berth type	Last bid
1	Duke	ACC	29–5	1	Automatic	2018
2	Michigan State	Big Ten	28–6	6	Automatic	2018
3	LSU	SEC	26–6	11	At-Large	2015
4	Virginia Tech	ACC	24–8	16	At-Large	2018
5	Mississippi State	SEC	23–10	20	At-Large	2009
6	Maryland	Big Ten	22–10	22	At-Large	2017
7	Louisville	ACC	20–13	25	At-Large	2017
8	VCU	Atlantic 10	25–7	29	At-Large	2017
9	UCF	American	23–8	34	At-Large	2005
10	Minnesota	Big Ten	21–13	39	At-Large	2017
11*	Temple	American	23–9	43	At-Large	2016
11*	Belmont	Ohio Valley	26–5	42	At-Large	2015
12	Liberty	ASUN	28–6	50	Automatic	2013
13	Saint Louis	Atlantic 10	23–12	53	Automatic	2014
14	Yale	Ivy	22–7	55	Automatic	2016
15	Bradley	Missouri Valley	20–14	61	Automatic	2006
16*	North Carolina Central	MEAC	18–15	68	Automatic	2018
16*	North Dakota State	Summit	18–15	67	Automatic	2015

South Regional – KFC Yum! Center, Louisville, Kentucky
Seed	School	Conference	Record	Overall Seed	Berth type	Last bid
1	Virginia	ACC	29–3	2	At-Large	2018
2	Tennessee	SEC	29–5	5	At-Large	2018
3	Purdue	Big Ten	23–9	12	At-Large	2018
4	Kansas State	Big 12	25–8	15	At-Large	2018
5	Wisconsin	Big Ten	23–10	19	At-Large	2017
6	Villanova	Big East	25–9	21	Automatic	2018
7	Cincinnati	American	28–6	27	Automatic	2018
8	Ole Miss	SEC	20–12	31	At-Large	2015
9	Oklahoma	Big 12	19–13	36	At-Large	2018
10	Iowa	Big Ten	22–11	37	At-Large	2016
11	Saint Mary's	West Coast	22–11	44	Automatic	2017
12	Oregon	Pac-12	23–12	48	Automatic	2017
13	UC Irvine	Big West	30–5	51	Automatic	2015
14	Old Dominion	C-USA	26–8	56	Automatic	2011
15	Colgate	Patriot	24–10	60	Automatic	1996
16	Gardner–Webb	Big South	23–11	63	Automatic	Never

West Regional – Honda Center, Anaheim, California
Seed	School	Conference	Record	Overall Seed	Berth type	Last bid
1	Gonzaga	West Coast	30–3	4	At-Large	2018
2	Michigan	Big Ten	28–6	8	At-Large	2018
3	Texas Tech	Big 12	26–6	10	At-Large	2018
4	Florida State	ACC	27–7	14	At-Large	2018
5	Marquette	Big East	24–9	17	At-Large	2017
6	Buffalo	MAC	31–3	23	Automatic	2018
7	Nevada	Mountain West	29–4	26	At-Large	2018
8	Syracuse	ACC	20–13	30	At-Large	2018
9	Baylor	Big 12	19–13	35	At-Large	2017
10	Florida	SEC	19–15	40	At-Large	2018
11*	Arizona State	Pac-12	22–10	45	At-Large	2018
11*	St. John's	Big East	21–12	47	At-Large	2015
12	Murray State	Ohio Valley	27–4	46	Automatic	2018
13	Vermont	America East	27–6	52	Automatic	2017
14	Northern Kentucky	Horizon	26–8	58	Automatic	2017
15	Montana	Big Sky	26–8	59	Automatic	2018
16*	Fairleigh Dickinson	Northeast	20–13	66	Automatic	2016
16*	Prairie View A&M	SWAC	22–12	65	Automatic	1998

Midwest Regional – Sprint Center, Kansas City, Missouri
Seed	School	Conference	Record	Overall Seed	Berth type	Last bid
1	North Carolina	ACC	27–6	3	At-Large	2018
2	Kentucky	SEC	27–6	7	At-Large	2018
3	Houston	American	31–3	9	At-Large	2018
4	Kansas	Big 12	25–9	13	At-Large	2018
5	Auburn	SEC	26–9	18	Automatic	2018
6	Iowa State	Big 12	23–11	24	Automatic	2017
7	Wofford	Southern	29–4	28	Automatic	2015
8	Utah State	Mountain West	28–6	32	Automatic	2011
9	Washington	Pac-12	26–8	33	At-Large	2011
10	Seton Hall	Big East	20–13	38	At-Large	2018
11	Ohio State	Big Ten	19–14	41	At-Large	2018
12	New Mexico State	WAC	30–4	49	Automatic	2018
13	Northeastern	CAA	23–10	54	Automatic	2015
14	Georgia State	Sun Belt	24–9	57	Automatic	2018
15	Abilene Christian	Southland	27–6	62	Automatic	Never
16	Iona	MAAC	17–15	64	Automatic	2018

*See First Four

== Tournament bracket ==
=== First Four – Dayton, OH ===
The First Four games involved eight teams: the four overall lowest-ranked teams, and the four lowest-ranked at-large teams.

March 19 – West Region
16	Prairie View A&M	76
16	Fairleigh Dickinson	82

March 19 – East Region
11	Belmont	81
11	Temple	70

March 20 – East Region
16	North Carolina Central	74
16	North Dakota State	78

March 20 – West Region
11	St. John's	65
11	Arizona State	74

=== East Regional – Washington, D.C. ===
First round Round of 64; March 21 and 22
1	Duke	85
16	North Dakota State	62
Columbia – Fri/Sun
8	VCU	58
9	UCF	73
5	Mississippi State	76
12	Liberty	80
San Jose – Fri/Sun
4	Virginia Tech	66
13	Saint Louis	52
6	Maryland	79
11	Belmont	77
Jacksonville – Thu/Sat
3	LSU	79
14	Yale	74
7	Louisville	76
10	Minnesota	86
Des Moines – Thu/Sat
2	Michigan State	76
15	Bradley	65

Second round Round of 32; March 23 and 24
1	Duke	77
9	UCF	76
12	Liberty	58
4	Virginia Tech	67
6	Maryland	67
3	LSU	69
10	Minnesota	50
2	Michigan State	70

Regional semifinals Sweet 16; March 29
1	Duke	75
4	Virginia Tech	73
3	LSU	63
2	Michigan State	80

Regional Final; Elite 8 March 31
1	Duke	67
2	Michigan State	68

==== East Regional Final ====
CBS

March 31
5:05 p.m. EDT

Box score

#2 Michigan State Spartans 68, #1 Duke Blue Devils 67
Scoring by half: 34–30, 34–37
Pts: C. Winston – 20; Rebs: K. Goins, X. Tillman – 9 Asts: C. Winston – 10	Pts: Z. Williamson – 24; Rebs: Z. Williamson – 14; Asts: R. Barrett – 6

Capital One Arena – Washington, D.C.
Attendance: 20,125
Referees: Doug Sirmons, Keith Kimble, John Gaffney

==== East Regional all-tournament team ====
- Cassius Winston, Michigan State (MOP)
- Xavier Tillman, Michigan State
- Zion Williamson, Duke
- RJ Barrett, Duke
- Kerry Blackshear Jr., Virginia Tech

=== West Regional – Anaheim, CA ===
First round Round of 64; March 21 and 22
1	Gonzaga	87
16	Fairleigh Dickinson	49
Salt Lake City – Thu/Sat
8	Syracuse	69
9	Baylor	78
5	Marquette	64
12	Murray State	83
Hartford – Thu/Sat
4	Florida State	76
13	Vermont	69
6	Buffalo	91
11	Arizona State	74
Tulsa – Fri/Sun
3	Texas Tech	72
14	Northern Kentucky	57
7	Nevada	61
10	Florida	70
Des Moines – Thu/Sat
2	Michigan	74
15	Montana	55

Second Round; Round of 32; March 23 and 24
1	Gonzaga	83
9	Baylor	71
12	Murray State	62
4	Florida State	90
6	Buffalo	58
3	Texas Tech	78
10	Florida	49
2	Michigan	64

Regional semifinals Sweet 16; March 28
1	Gonzaga	72
4	Florida State	58
3	Texas Tech	63
2	Michigan	44

Regional Final; Elite 8 March 30
1	Gonzaga	69
3	Texas Tech	75

==== West Regional Final ====
TBS

March 30
3:09 p.m. PDT

Box score

#3 Texas Tech Red Raiders 75, #1 Gonzaga Bulldogs 69
Scoring by half: 35–37, 40–32
Pts: J. Culver – 19; Rebs: T. Owens – 7 Asts: M. Mooney – 5	Pts: R. Hachimura – 23; Rebs: B. Clarke – 12; Asts: J. Perkins – 6

Honda Center – Anaheim, California
Attendance: 15,277
Referees: John Higgins, Roger Ayers, Earl Walton

==== West Regional all-tournament team ====
- Jarrett Culver, Texas Tech (MOP)
- Matt Mooney, Texas Tech
- Rui Hachimura, Gonzaga
- Brandon Clarke, Gonzaga
- Trent Forrest, Florida State

=== South Regional – Louisville, KY ===
First round Round of 64; March 21 and 22
1	Virginia	71
16	Gardner–Webb	56
Columbia – Fri/Sun
8	Ole Miss	72
9	Oklahoma	95
5	Wisconsin	54
12	Oregon	72
San Jose – Fri/Sun
4	Kansas State	64
13	UC Irvine	70
6	Villanova	61
11	Saint Mary's	57
Hartford – Thu/Sat
3	Purdue	61
14	Old Dominion	48
7	Cincinnati	72
10	Iowa	79
Columbus – Fri/Sun
2	Tennessee	77
15	Colgate	70

Second Round; Round of 32; March 23 and 24
1	Virginia	63
9	Oklahoma	51
12	Oregon	73
13	UC Irvine	54
6	Villanova	61
3	Purdue	87
10	Iowa	77
2	Tennessee	83^{OT}

Regional semifinals Sweet 16; March 28
1	Virginia	53
12	Oregon	49
3	Purdue	99^{OT}
2	Tennessee	94

Regional Final; Elite 8 March 30
1	Virginia	80^{OT}
3	Purdue	75

==== South Regional Final ====
TBS

March 30
8:49 p.m. EDT

Box score

#3 Purdue Boilermakers 75, #1 Virginia Cavaliers 80 (OT)
Scoring by half: 30–29, 40–41 Overtime: 5–10
Pts: C. Edwards – 42; Rebs: T. Williams – 7 Asts: N. Eastern – 3	Pts: K. Guy – 25; Rebs: K. Guy – 10; Asts: T. Jerome – 7

KFC Yum! Center – Louisville, Kentucky
Attendance: 21,623
Referees: Ron Groover, Tony Padilla, Bo Boroski

==== South Regional all-tournament team ====
- Carsen Edwards, Purdue (MOP)
- Kyle Guy, Virginia
- Mamadi Diakite, Virginia
- Ty Jerome, Virginia
- Ryan Cline, Purdue

=== Midwest Regional – Kansas City, MO ===
First round Round of 64; March 21 and 22
1	North Carolina	88
16	Iona	73
Columbus – Fri/Sun
8	Utah State	61
9	Washington	78
5	Auburn	78
12	New Mexico State	77
Salt Lake City – Thu/Sat
4	Kansas	87
13	Northeastern	53
6	Iowa State	59
11	Ohio State	62
Tulsa – Fri/Sun
3	Houston	84
14	Georgia State	55
7	Wofford	84
10	Seton Hall	68
Jacksonville – Thu/Sat
2	Kentucky	79
15	Abilene Christian	44

Second round Round of 32; March 23 and 24
1	North Carolina	81
9	Washington	59
5	Auburn	89
4	Kansas	75
11	Ohio State	59
3	Houston	74
7	Wofford	56
2	Kentucky	62

Regional semifinals Sweet 16; March 29
1	North Carolina	80
5	Auburn	97
3	Houston	58
2	Kentucky	62

Regional final Elite 8 March 31
5	Auburn	77^{OT}
2	Kentucky	71

==== Midwest Regional Final ====
CBS

March 31
1:20 p.m. CDT

Box score

#5 Auburn Tigers 77, #2 Kentucky Wildcats 71 (OT)
Scoring by half: 30–35, 30–25 Overtime: 17–11
Pts: J. Harper – 26; Rebs: S. Doughty, D. Purifoy – 7 Asts: J. Harper – 5	Pts: P. Washington – 28; Rebs: P. Washington – 13; Asts: T. Herro – 6

Sprint Center – Kansas City, Missouri
Attendance: 17,174
Referees: Terry Wymer, Mike Roberts, Brian Dorsey

==== Midwest Regional all-tournament team ====
- Jared Harper, Auburn (MOP)
- Bryce Brown, Auburn
- Chuma Okeke, Auburn
- P. J. Washington, Kentucky
- Tyler Herro, Kentucky

=== Final Four – Minneapolis, MN ===
National Semifinals; Final Four; Saturday, April 6
E2	Michigan State	51
W3	Texas Tech	61
S1	Virginia	63
MW5	Auburn	62

National Championship Game; Monday, April 8
W3	Texas Tech	77
S1	Virginia	85^{OT}

==== National semifinals ====
CBS

Saturday, April 6
5:09 p.m. CDT

Box score

#MW5 Auburn Tigers 62, #S1 Virginia Cavaliers 63
Scoring by half: 31–28, 31–35
Pts: S. Doughty – 13; Rebs: A. McLemore – 12; Asts: J. Harper, B. Brown – 3	Pts: T. Jerome – 21; Rebs: T. Jerome – 9 Asts: T. Jerome – 6

U.S. Bank Stadium – Minneapolis, Minnesota
Attendance: 72,711
Referees: Doug Sirmons, Keith Kimble, James Breeding

CBS

Saturday, April 6
7:49 p.m. CDT

Box score

#W3 Texas Tech Red Raiders 61, #E2 Michigan State Spartans 51
Scoring by half: 23–21, 38–30
Pts: M. Mooney – 22; Rebs: N. Odiase – 9 Asts: Three tied – 2	Pts: C. Winston – 16; Rebs: X. Tillman, K. Goins – 8 Asts: K. Goins, C. Winston – 2

U.S. Bank Stadium – Minneapolis, Minnesota
Attendance: 72,711
Referees: Jeff Anderson, Doug Shows, Bo Boroski

==== National Championship ====
CBS

Monday, April 8
8:20 p.m. CDT

#W3 Texas Tech Red Raiders 77, #S1 Virginia Cavaliers 85 (OT)
Scoring by half: 29–32, 39–36 Overtime: 9–17
Pts: B. Francis – 17; Rebs: J. Culver – 9 Asts: J. Culver – 6	Pts: D. Hunter – 27; Rebs: B. Key – 10; Asts: T. Jerome – 9

U.S. Bank Stadium – Minneapolis, Minnesota
Attendance: 72,062
Referees: Michael Stephens, Terry Wymer, Ron Groover

==== Final Four all-tournament team ====
- Kyle Guy (Jr, Virginia) – Final Four Most Outstanding Player
- Jarrett Culver (So, Texas Tech)
- Matt Mooney (Gr, Texas Tech)
- De'Andre Hunter (So, Virginia)
- Ty Jerome (Jr, Virginia)

== Game summaries and tournament notes ==
=== Upsets ===
Per the NCAA, "Upsets are defined as when the winner of the game was seeded five or more places lower than the team it defeated."

There were five upsets during the whole tournament, and all of them were in the first round.

Upsets in the 2019 NCAA Division I men's basketball tournament
Round	East	West	South	Midwest
Round of 64	No. 12 Liberty defeated No. 5 Mississippi State, 80–76	No. 12 Murray State defeated No. 5 Marquette, 83–64	No. 13 UC Irvine defeated No. 4 Kansas State, 70–64; No. 12 Oregon defeated No. 5 Wisconsin, 72–54	No. 11 Ohio State defeated No. 6 Iowa State, 62–59
Round of 32	None			
Sweet 16	None			
Elite 8	None			
Final 4	None			
National Championship	None			

== Record by conference ==
Conference	Bids	Record	Win %	R64	R32	S16	E8	F4	CG	NC
ACC	7	15–6	.714	7	5	5	2	1	1	1
Big 12	6	8–6	.571	6	4	1	1	1	1	–
Big Ten	8	13–8	.619	8	7	3	2	1	–	–
SEC	7	12–7	.632	7	5	4	2	1	–	–
WCC	2	3–2	.600	2	1	1	1	–	–	–
American	4	3–4	.429	3	2	1	–	–	–	–
Pac-12	3	4–3	.571	3	2	1	–	–	–	–
Big East	4	1–4	.200	3	1	–	–	–	–	–
Ohio Valley	2	2–2	.500	2	1	–	–	–	–	–
Atlantic Sun	1	1–1	.500	1	1	–	–	–	–	–
Big West	1	1–1	.500	1	1	–	–	–	–	–
MAC	1	1–1	.500	1	1	–	–	–	–	–
Southern	1	1–1	.500	1	1	–	–	–	–	–
Atlantic 10	2	0–2	.000	2	–	–	–	–	–	–
Mountain West	2	0–2	.000	2	–	–	–	–	–	–
NEC	1	1–1	.500	1	–	–	–	–	–	–
Summit	1	1–1	.500	1	–	–	–	–	–	–

- The R64, R32, S16, E8, F4, CG, and NC columns indicate how many teams from each conference were in the round of 64 (first round), round of 32 (second round), Sweet 16, Elite Eight, Final Four, championship game, and national champion, respectively.
- The "Record" column includes wins in the First Four for the NEC, Ohio Valley, Pac-12, and Summit conferences and losses in the First Four for the American and Big East conference.
- The SWAC and MEAC each had one representative, eliminated in the First Four with a record of 0–1.
- The America East, Big Sky, Big South, Colonial, C-USA, Horizon, MAAC, Missouri Valley, Patriot, Southland, Sun Belt, WAC, and Ivy League each had one representative, eliminated in the Round of 64 with a record of 0–1.

== Media coverage ==
=== Television ===
CBS Sports and Turner Sports (via TBS, TNT, and truTV) had U.S. television rights to the tournament. As part of a cycle than began in 2016, CBS televised the 2019 Final Four and championship game.

In response to criticism over TBS's handling of the selection show in 2018 (which featured an unconventional two-hour format where all the qualifying teams were first revealed in alphabetical order before the matchups were actually unveiled, and had viewership fall by 52% partly due to it also being aired on cable rather than CBS), it was announced that CBS's selection show would revert to an hour-long format, and prioritize unveiling the bracket. CNN president Jeff Zucker, who had also become head of WarnerMedia's sports properties after a reorganization, explained that "it's a sign of understanding when things don't necessarily go as well as you would hope you change it. So there's no shame in that. At the end of the day, you have to give the fans what they want." The show attracted its highest viewership since 2014 and averaged a 4.0 share on Nielsen overnight ratings.

==== Television channels ====
- First Four – truTV
- First and second rounds – CBS, TBS, TNT, and truTV
- Regional semifinals and finals (Sweet Sixteen and Elite Eight) – CBS and TBS
- National semifinals (Final Four) and championship – CBS

==== Studio hosts ====
- Greg Gumbel (New York City and Minneapolis) – First round, second round, Regionals, Final Four and National Championship Game
- Ernie Johnson (New York City, Atlanta, and Minneapolis) – First round, second round, Regional Semi-Finals, Final Four and National Championship Game
- Casey Stern (Atlanta) – First Four, first round and second round
- Adam Zucker (New York) – First round and second round (game breaks)

==== Studio analysts ====
- Charles Barkley (New York City and Minneapolis) – First round, second round, Regionals, Final Four and National Championship Game
- Mike Brey (Atlanta) – Regional Semi-Finals
- Jeff Capel (Atlanta) – First round
- Seth Davis (Atlanta and Minneapolis) – First Four, first round, second round, Regional Semi-Finals, Final Four and National Championship Game
- Brendan Haywood (Atlanta) – First Four, first round, second round and Regional semi-finals
- Clark Kellogg (New York City and Minneapolis) – First round, second round, Regionals, Final Four and National Championship Game
- Porter Moser (Atlanta) – Second round
- Candace Parker (Atlanta and Minneapolis) – First Four, first round, second round, Regional Semi-Finals and Final Four
- Kenny Smith (New York City and Minneapolis) – First round, second round, Regionals, Final Four and National Championship Game
- Gene Steratore (New York City and Minneapolis) (Rules Analyst) – First Four, first round, second round, Regionals, Final Four and National Championship Game
- Wally Szczerbiak (New York City and Minneapolis) – Second round and Final Four
- Jay Wright (Minneapolis) – Final Four

==== Commentary teams ====
- Jim Nantz/Bill Raftery/Grant Hill/Tracy Wolfson – First and second rounds at Columbia, South Carolina; East Regional at Washington, D.C.; Final Four and National Championship at Minneapolis, Minnesota
- Brian Anderson/Chris Webber/Allie LaForce – First and second rounds at Columbus, Ohio; South Regional at Louisville, Kentucky
- Ian Eagle/Jim Spanarkel/Jamie Erdahl – First and second rounds at Jacksonville, Florida; Midwest Regional at Kansas City, Missouri
- Kevin Harlan/Reggie Miller/Dan Bonner/Dana Jacobson – First Four at Dayton, Ohio (Tuesday); first and second rounds at Des Moines, Iowa; West Regional at Anaheim, California
- Brad Nessler/Steve Lavin/Jim Jackson/Evan Washburn – First and second rounds at Tulsa, Oklahoma
- Spero Dedes/Steve Smith/Len Elmore or Jim Jackson/Rosalyn Gold-Onwude – First Four at Dayton, Ohio (Wednesday); first and second rounds at San Jose, California
  - Jackson called the First Four (Wednesday) with Elmore doing the first and second rounds with Dedes, Smith and Gold-Onwude.
- Andrew Catalon/Steve Lappas/Lisa Byington – First and second rounds at Salt Lake City, Utah
- Carter Blackburn/Debbie Antonelli/John Schriffen – First and second rounds at Hartford, Connecticut

ESPN International had international rights to the tournament. Coverage uses CBS/Turner play-by-play teams until the Final Four.

- Sean McDonough, Jay Bilas (Texas Tech vs. Michigan State), Dick Vitale (Virginia vs. Auburn, National Championship Game)

=== Radio ===
Westwood One had exclusive radio rights to the entire tournament.

==== First Four ====
- Ted Emrich and Austin Croshere – at Dayton, Ohio

==== First and second rounds ====
- Scott Graham and Donny Marshall – Hartford, Connecticut
- Kevin Kugler and Robbie Hummel – Des Moines, Iowa
- Tom McCarthy and Jon Crispin – Jacksonville, Florida
- John Sadak and Dan Dickau – Salt Lake City, Utah
- Brandon Gaudin and John Thompson – Columbia, South Carolina
- Craig Way and Will Perdue – Columbus, Ohio
- Ryan Radtke and P. J. Carlesimo – Tulsa, Oklahoma
- Chris Carrino and Mike Montgomery – San Jose, California

==== Regionals ====
- Kevin Kugler and John Thompson – East Regional at Washington, D.C.
- Scott Graham and P. J. Carlesimo – Midwest Regional at Kansas City, Missouri
- Brandon Gaudin and Will Perdue – South Regional at Louisville, Kentucky
- Ryan Radtke and Jim Jackson – West Regional at Anaheim, California

==== Final Four ====
- Kevin Kugler, John Thompson, Clark Kellogg, and Jim Gray – Minneapolis, Minnesota

=== Internet ===
==== Video ====
Live video of games was available for streaming through the following means:

- NCAA March Madness Live (website and app, no CBS games on digital media players; access to games on WarnerMedia channels (TBS, TNT, truTV) required TV Everywhere authentication through provider)
- CBS All Access (only CBS games, service subscription required)
- CBS Sports website and app (only CBS games)
- Watch TBS website and app (only TBS games, required TV Everywhere authentication)
- Watch TNT website and app (only TNT games, required TV Everywhere authentication)
- Watch truTV website and app (only truTV games, required TV Everywhere authentication)
- Websites and apps of cable, satellite, and OTT providers of CBS, TBS, TNT, and truTV (access required subscription)

In addition, the March Madness app offered Fast Break, whiparound coverage of games similar to NFL RedZone.

- Adam Lefkoe, Tony Delk, Steve Alford, Andy Katz – Atlanta

==== Audio ====
Live audio of games was available for streaming through the following means:

- NCAA March Madness Live (website and app)
- Westwood One Sports website
- TuneIn (website and app)
- Websites and apps of Westwood One Sports affiliates

=== Film ===
#16 seed Gardner–Webb's season and appearance in the tournament became the subject of a documentary titled The Dancin' Bulldogs, released on October 16, 2020.

== See also ==
- 2019 NCAA Division I women's basketball tournament
- 2019 NCAA Division II men's basketball tournament
- 2019 NCAA Division III men's basketball tournament
- 2019 NAIA Division I men's basketball tournament
