= 2018–19 South Dakota State Jackrabbits men's basketball team =

American college basketball season

2018–19 South Dakota State Jackrabbits men's basketball

Summit League regular season champion

NIT, First round
- Conference: Summit League
- Record: 24–9 (14–2 The Summit)
- Head coach: T. J. Otzelberger (3rd season)
- Assistant coaches: Eric Henderson; Rob Klinkefus; Curtis Weathers
- Home arena: Frost Arena

2018–19 Summit League men's basketball standings
	Conf.				Overall
Team	W		L	PCT	W		L	PCT
South Dakota State	14	–	2	.875	24	–	9	.727
Omaha	13	–	3	.813	21	–	11	.656
Purdue Fort Wayne	9	–	7	.563	18	–	15	.545
North Dakota State †	9	–	7	.563	19	–	16	.543
Oral Roberts	7	–	9	.438	11	–	21	.344
South Dakota	7	–	9	.438	13	–	17	.433
North Dakota	6	–	10	.375	12	–	18	.400
Western Illinois	4	–	12	.250	10	–	21	.323
Denver	3	–	13	.188	8	–	22	.267
† 2019 Summit League tournament winner

The 2018–19 South Dakota State Jackrabbits men's basketball team represented South Dakota State University during the 2018–19 NCAA Division I men's basketball season. The Jackrabbits, led by third-year head coach T. J. Otzelberger, played their home games at Frost Arena in Brookings, South Dakota as members of the Summit League. They finished the season 24–9, 14–2 in Summit League play to win the regular season championship. They lost in the quarterfinals of the Summit League tournament to Western Illinois. As a regular season league champion who failed to win their league tournament, they received an automatic bid to the National Invitation Tournament. They lost in the first round to Texas.

== Previous season ==
The Jackrabbits finished the season 28–7, 13–1 in Summit League play to win the Summit League regular season championship. In the Summit League tournament, they defeated Western Illinois, North Dakota State, and South Dakota to become Summit League Tournament champions. They received the Summit League's automatic bid to the NCAA tournament where they lost in the first round to Ohio State.

== Roster ==
2018–19 South Dakota State Jackrabbits men's basketball team
Players
Coaches

Pos.	#	Name	Height	Weight	Year	Hometown
PG	0	Brandon Key	5 ft 10 in (1.78 m)	180 lb (82 kg)	Sr	Milwaukee, Wisconsin
G	1	Skyler Flatten	6 ft 6 in (1.98 m)	210 lb (95 kg)	RS Sr	Clark, South Dakota
G	2	Tevin King	6 ft 2 in (1.88 m)	200 lb (91 kg)	Sr	Chicago, Illinois
F	4	Ryan Kreuger	6 ft 6 in (1.98 m)	220 lb (100 kg)	RS Fr	New London, Wisconsin
G	5	David Jenkins	6 ft 2 in (1.88 m)	200 lb (91 kg)	So	Tacoma, Washington
F	10	Alou Dillon	6 ft 8 in (2.03 m)	230 lb (104 kg)	RS Fr	Wauwatosa, Wisconsin
G	11	Matthew Mims	6 ft 4 in (1.93 m)	190 lb (86 kg)	So	Cedar Rapids, Iowa
G	15	Beau Brown	6 ft 1 in (1.85 m)	175 lb (79 kg)	Jr	Mitchell, South Dakota
F	22	Aaron Fiegen	6 ft 7 in (2.01 m)	200 lb (91 kg)	Fr	Madison, South Dakota
G	23	Owen King	6 ft 3 in (1.91 m)	200 lb (91 kg)	Fr	Caledonia, Minnesota
F	24	Mike Daum	6 ft 9 in (2.06 m)	235 lb (107 kg)	Sr	Kimball, Nebraska
G/F	32	Matt Dentlinger	6 ft 8 in (2.03 m)	250 lb (113 kg)	RS Fr	Carroll, Iowa
G	34	Alex Arians	6 ft 4 in (1.93 m)	200 lb (91 kg)	RS Fr	Madison, Wisconsin

Head coach

- T. J. Otzelberger (UW–Whitewater)

Assistant coach(es)

- Rob Klinkefus (Buena Vista)
- Eric Henderson (Wayne State (NE))
- Curtis Weathers (Marquette)

Legend

- (C) Team captain
- (S) Suspended
- (I) Ineligible
- (W) Walk-on
- Injured
- Current redshirt

Roster
Last update: Aug 27, 2018

== Schedule and results ==
Date time, TV	Rank^{#}	Opponent^{#}	Result	Record	Site (attendance) city, state
Exhibition
Nov 1, 2018*; 8:00 pm		South Dakota Mines	W 82–63		Frost Arena (1,624); Brookings, SD
Non-conference regular season
Nov 6, 2018*; 7:00 pm, ESPN3		Grand Canyon; Summit/WAC Challenge	W 79–74	1–0	Frost Arena (1,933); Brookings, SD
Nov 8, 2018*; 7:00 pm, ESPN+		Alabama State	W 78–61	2–0	Frost Arena (2,277); Brookings, SD
Nov 10, 2018*; 4:00 pm		Bemidji State; Gulf Coast Showcase	W 86–63	3–0	Frost Arena (1,566); Brookings, SD
Nov 16, 2018*; 7:00 pm		at Florida Gulf Coast	L 78–84	3–1	Alico Arena (3,725); Fort Myers, FL
Nov 19, 2018*; 10:00 am		vs. Tulane; Gulf Coast Showcase quarterfinals	L 80–84	3–2	Hertz Arena (317); Estero, FL
Nov 20, 2018*; 10:00 am		vs. UTSA; Gulf Coast Showcase consolation 2nd round	W 99–79	4–2	Hertz Arena (487); Estero, FL
Nov 21, 2018*; 12:30 pm		vs. Colorado State; Gulf Coast Showcase 5th place game	W 78–65	5–2	Hertz Arena (657); Estero, FL
Nov 28, 2018*; 7:00 pm		UMKC	W 75–47	6–2	Frost Arena (1,494); Brookings, SD
Dec 1, 2018*; 8:00 pm		vs. Northern Iowa; U.S. Bank Stadium Classic	W 82–50	7–2	U.S. Bank Stadium (3,184); Minneapolis, MN
Dec 4, 2018*; 7:00 pm, ESPN3		at Memphis	L 80–83	7–3	FedExForum (13,583); Memphis, TN
Dec 7, 2018*; 7:00 pm		Southern	W 101–92	8–3	Frost Arena (2,156); Brookings, SD
Dec 11, 2018*; 7:00 pm		Savannah State	W 139–72	9–3	Frost Arena (1,776); Brookings, SD
Dec 15, 2018*; 8:00 pm		at No. 7 Nevada	L 68–72	9–4	Lawlor Events Center (11,257); Reno, NV
Dec 18, 2018*; 8:05 pm		at Eastern Washington; Big Sky/Summit Challenge	W 74–64	10–4	Reese Court (1,042); Cheney, WA
Dec 22, 2018*; 7:00 pm		Montana; Big Sky/Summit Challenge	L 74–85	10–5	Frost Arena (2,540); Brookings, SD
Summit League regular season
Dec 28, 2018; 4:00 pm		at Western Illinois	W 100–58	11–5 (1–0)	Western Hall (441); Macomb, IL
Jan 3, 2019; 7:35 pm		at Purdue Fort Wayne	L 88–104	11–6 (1–1)	Gates Sports Center (1,803); Fort Wayne, IN
Jan 6, 2019; 3:30 pm, ESPN+		at South Dakota	W 79–61	12–6 (2–1)	Sanford Coyote Sports Center (6,014); Vermillion, SD
Jan 10, 2019; 7:00 pm		Denver	W 78–66	13–6 (3–1)	Frost Arena (2,505); Brookings, SD
Jan 12, 2019; 4:15 pm, ESPN3		Oral Roberts	W 84–65	14–6 (4–1)	Frost Arena (3,680); Brookings, SD
Jan 16, 2019; 7:00 pm, ESPN+		at North Dakota	W 78–74	15–6 (5–1)	Betty Engelstad Sioux Center (1,880); Grand Forks, ND
Jan 24, 2019; 7:00 pm, ESPN+		North Dakota State	W 87–69	16–6 (6–1)	Frost Arena (2,578); Brookings, SD
Jan 26, 2019; 4:15 pm, ESPN3		Omaha	W 83–73	17–6 (7–1)	Frost Arena (3,881); Brookings, SD
Jan 31, 2019; 7:00 pm, ESPN+		at Oral Roberts	W 86–80	18–6 (8–1)	Mabee Center (2,287); Tulsa, OK
Feb 3, 2019; 2:00 pm		at Denver	W 92–82	19–6 (9–1)	Magness Arena (1,641); Denver, CO
Feb 9, 2019; 4:15 pm, ESPN3		North Dakota	W 80–55	20–6 (10–1)	Frost Arena (3.541); Brookings, SD
Feb 14, 2019; 7:00 pm, ESPN+		at Omaha	L 84–85	20–7 (10–2)	Baxter Arena (4,228); Omaha, NE
Feb 16, 2019; 4:00 pm, ESPN+		at North Dakota State	W 78–77	21–7 (11–2)	Scheels Center (3,957); Fargo, ND
Feb 21, 2019; 7:00 pm, ESPN+		Purdue Fort Wayne	W 92–83	22–7 (12–2)	Frost Arena; Brookings, SD
Feb 23, 2019; 4:00 pm, ESPN3		South Dakota	W 94–89	23–7 (13–2)	Frost Arena; Brookings, SD
Mar 2, 2019; 4:15 pm		Western Illinois	W 86–66	24–7 (14–2)	Frost Arena (3,746); Brookings, SD
Summit League tournament
Mar 9, 2019; 6:00 pm	(1)	vs. (8) Western Illinois; Quarterfinals	L 76–79	24–8	Premier Center; Sioux Falls, SD
National Invitational tournament
Mar 19, 2019*; 8:00 pm, ESPN	(7)	at (2) Texas; First round – Alabama bracket	L 73–79	24–9	Frank Erwin Center (1,739); Austin, TX
*Non-conference game. ^{#}Rankings from AP Poll. (#) Tournament seedings in parentheses. All times are in Central Time.
