= 2018–19 Omaha Mavericks men's basketball team =

American college basketball season

2018–19 Omaha Mavericks men's basketball
- Conference: The Summit League
- Record: 21–11 (13–3 The Summit)
- Head coach: Derrin Hansen (14th season)
- Assistant coaches: Pat Eberhart; Tyler Erwin; Tyler Bullock
- Home arena: Baxter Arena

2018–19 Summit League men's basketball standings
	Conf.				Overall
Team	W		L	PCT	W		L	PCT
South Dakota State	14	–	2	.875	24	–	9	.727
Omaha	13	–	3	.813	21	–	11	.656
Purdue Fort Wayne	9	–	7	.563	18	–	15	.545
North Dakota State †	9	–	7	.563	19	–	16	.543
Oral Roberts	7	–	9	.438	11	–	21	.344
South Dakota	7	–	9	.438	13	–	17	.433
North Dakota	6	–	10	.375	12	–	18	.400
Western Illinois	4	–	12	.250	10	–	21	.323
Denver	3	–	13	.188	8	–	22	.267
† 2019 Summit League tournament winner

The 2018–19 Omaha Mavericks men's basketball team represented the University of Nebraska Omaha during the 2018–19 NCAA Division I men's basketball season. The Mavericks, led by 14th-year head coach Derrin Hansen, played their home games at Baxter Arena as members of The Summit League.

== Previous season ==
The Mavericks finished the season 9–22, 4–10 in Summit League play to finish in seventh place. They lost in the quarterfinals of the Summit League tournament to South Dakota State.

== Roster ==
2018–19 Omaha Mavericks men's basketball team
Players
Coaches

Pos.	#	Name	Height	Weight	Year	Hometown
G	0	JT Gibson	6 ft 3 in (1.91 m)	195 lb (88 kg)	RS Jr	Brooklyn Park, Minnesota
G	1	Elishja Duplechan	5 ft 11 in (1.8 m)	180 lb (82 kg)	So	Sacramento, California
G	4	Zach Thornhill	6 ft 4 in (1.93 m)	185 lb (84 kg)	RS Fr	Lenexa, Kansas
G	5	K. J. Robinson	6 ft 0 in (1.83 m)	190 lb (86 kg)	Jr	Blue Springs, Missouri
G	10	Ayo Akinwole	6 ft 0 in (1.83 m)	165 lb (75 kg)	So	Papillion, Nebraska
G	11	Kyle Luedtke	6 ft 5 in (1.96 m)	190 lb (86 kg)	Fr	Omaha, Nebraska
F	13	Wanjang Tut	6 ft 8 in (2.03 m)	205 lb (93 kg)	RS Fr	Omaha, Nebraska
G	20	Hayden Miller	6 ft 1 in (1.85 m)	180 lb (82 kg)	RS Fr	Nebraska City, Nebraska
G	21	Zach Jackson	6 ft 5 in (1.96 m)	185 lb (84 kg)	Sr	Wichita, Kansas
C	22	Brett Barney	6 ft 9 in (2.06 m)	210 lb (95 kg)	Jr	Wichita, Kansas
F	32	Logan Strom	6 ft 8 in (2.03 m)	240 lb (109 kg)	RS Fr	Norfolk, Nebraska
C	33	Evan Tricker	6 ft 11 in (2.11 m)	180 lb (82 kg)	RS Fr	Naples, Florida
F	40	Matt Pile	6 ft 8 in (2.03 m)	240 lb (109 kg)	So	Goddard, Kansas
F	44	Mitch Hahn	6 ft 8 in (2.03 m)	210 lb (95 kg)	Sr	Fremont, Nebraska

Head coach

- Derrin Hansen (Nebraska Wesleyan)

Assistant coach(es)

- Pat Eberhart (Adams State)
- Tyler Erwin (Midland)
- Tyler Bullock (Omaha)

Legend

- (C) Team captain
- (S) Suspended
- (I) Ineligible
- (W) Walk-on
- Injured
- Current redshirt

Roster
Last update: October 31, 2018

== Schedule and results ==
Date time, TV	Rank^{#}	Opponent^{#}	Result	Record	Site (attendance) city, state
Regular season
Nov 6, 2018*; 7:00 pm, BTN Plus		at Minnesota	L 76–104	0–1	Williams Arena (8,883); Minneapolis, MN
Nov 9, 2018*; 12:00 pm		Buena Vista	W 94–58	1–1	Baxter Arena (527); Omaha, NE
Nov 14, 2018*; 7:00 pm		Northern Arizona	L 66–76	1–2	Baxter Arena (1,468); Omaha, NE
Nov 16, 2018*; 8:00 pm, P12N		at Colorado	L 75–79	1–3	CU Events Center (5,720); Boulder, CO
Nov 20, 2018*; 6:00 pm		at Bethune–Cookman	W 76–56	2–3	Moore Gymnasium (781); Daytona Beach, FL
Nov 24, 2018*; 7:00 pm		Montana State; Big Sky/Summit Challenge	W 89–65	3–3	Baxter Arena (1,434); Omaha, NE
Nov 26, 2018*; 7:00 pm		at Iowa State	L 55–82	3–4	Hilton Coliseum (13,733); Ames, IA
Nov 28, 2018*; 8:00 pm, P12N		at Arizona State	L 71–89	3–5	Wells Fargo Arena (6,951); Tempe, AZ
Dec 6, 2018*; 9:00 pm		at Seattle; WAC/Summit League Challenge	L 71–90	3–6	Redhawk Center (873); Seattle, WA
Dec 8, 2018*; 7:00 pm, P12		at Oregon	L 61–84	3–7	Matthew Knight Arena (8,052); Eugene, OR
Dec 15, 2018*; 5:00 pm		at Idaho; Big Sky/Summit Challenge	W 89–80	4–7	Cowan Spectrum (459); Moscow, ID
Dec 19, 2018*; 7:00 pm		UC Santa Barbara	W 85–74	5–7	Baxter Arena (1,817); Omaha, NE
Dec 21, 2018*; 7:00 pm		at Rice	W 83–66	6–7	Tudor Fieldhouse (1,276); Houston, TX
Summit League regular season
Dec 28, 2018; 7:30 pm		Denver	W 91–84	7–7 (1–0)	Baxter Arena (2,090); Omaha, NE
Dec 30, 2018; 4:30 pm		Oral Roberts	L 84–87	7–8 (1–1)	Baxter Arena (1,764); Omaha, NE
Jan 2, 2019; 7:00 pm, MidcoSN2/Yurview		North Dakota State	W 90–77	8–8 (2–1)	Baxter Arena (1,775); Omaha, NE
Jan 10, 2019; 7:00 pm, ESPN+/MidcoSN2/Yurview		at North Dakota	W 92–91	9–8 (3–1)	Betty Engelstad Sioux Center (1,525); Grand Forks, ND
Jan 17, 2019; 7:00 pm		at Western Illinois	W 80–71	10–8 (4–1)	Western Hall (426); Macomb, IL
Jan 20, 2019; 6:00 pm, ESPN+/MidcoSN2/Yurview		South Dakota	W 75–68	11–8 (5–1)	Baxter Arena (2,132); Omaha, NE
Jan 24, 2019; 6:00 pm		at Purdue Fort Wayne	W 85–79	12–8 (6–1)	Gates Sports Center (1,125); Fort Wayne, IN
Jan 26, 2019; 4:15 pm, ESPN3/MidcoSN2/Yurview		at South Dakota State	L 73–83	12–9 (6–2)	Frost Arena (3,881); Brookings, SD
Feb 3, 2019; 12:00 pm, ESPN+/MidcoSN2/Yurview		North Dakota	W 90–72	13–9 (7–2)	Baxter Arena (2,054); Omaha, NE
Feb 7, 2019; 7:00 pm, ESPN+/MidcoSN2/Yurview		vs. South Dakota	W 107–102 ^{OT}	14–9 (8–2)	Sanford Pentagon (789); Sioux Falls, SD
Feb 14, 2019; 7:00 pm, MidcoSN2/Yurview		South Dakota State	W 85–84	15–9 (9–2)	Baxter Arena (4,228); Omaha, NE
Feb 16, 2019; 4:30 pm		Purdue Fort Wayne	W 74–71	16–9 (10–2)	Baxter Arena (3,678); Omaha, NE
Feb 20, 2019; 7:00 pm		Western Illinois	W 77-63	17–9 (11–2)	Baxter Arena (2,666); Omaha, NE
Feb 23, 2019; 4:00 pm, ESPN3/MidcoSN2/Yurview		at North Dakota State	W 58–50	18–9 (12–2)	Scheels Center (2,177); Fargo, ND
Feb 28, 2019; 7:30 pm, ESPN+		at Oral Roberts	L 80–84	18–10 (12–3)	Mabee Center (2,139); Tulsa, OK
Mar 2, 2019; 2:00 pm, ALT		at Denver	W 86–76	19–10 (13–3)	Magness Arena (1,773); Denver, CO
Summit League tournament
Mar 9, 2019; 8:30 pm, ESPN+	(2)	vs. (7) North Dakota; Quarterfinals	W 81–76	20–10	Premier Center; Sioux Falls, SD
Mar 11, 2019; 8:30 pm, ESPN+	(2)	vs. (3) Purdue Fort Wayne; Semifinals	W 61–60	21–10	Premier Center (4,508); Sioux Falls, SD
Mar 12, 2019; 8:00 pm, ESPN2	(2)	vs. (4) North Dakota State; Championship Game	L 63–73	21–11	Premier Center (4,076); Sioux Falls, SD
*Non-conference game. ^{#}Rankings from AP Poll. (#) Tournament seedings in parentheses. All times are in Central Time Source.
