= 2018–19 South Dakota Coyotes men's basketball team =

American college basketball season

2018–19 South Dakota Coyotes men's basketball
- Conference: The Summit League
- Record: 13–17 (7–9 The Summit)
- Head coach: Todd Lee (1st season)
- Assistant coaches: Gameli Ahelegbe; Brad Davidson; Luke DallaRiva
- Home arena: Sanford Coyote Sports Center

2018–19 Summit League men's basketball standings
	Conf.				Overall
Team	W		L	PCT	W		L	PCT
South Dakota State	14	–	2	.875	24	–	9	.727
Omaha	13	–	3	.813	21	–	11	.656
Purdue Fort Wayne	9	–	7	.563	18	–	15	.545
North Dakota State †	9	–	7	.563	19	–	16	.543
Oral Roberts	7	–	9	.438	11	–	21	.344
South Dakota	7	–	9	.438	13	–	17	.433
North Dakota	6	–	10	.375	12	–	18	.400
Western Illinois	4	–	12	.250	10	–	21	.323
Denver	3	–	13	.188	8	–	22	.267
† 2019 Summit League tournament winner

The 2018–19 South Dakota Coyotes men's basketball team represented the University of South Dakota during the 2018–19 NCAA Division I men's basketball season. The Coyotes, led by first-year head coach Todd Lee, played their home games at the Sanford Coyote Sports Center in Vermillion, South Dakota as members of the Summit League.

== Previous season ==
The Coyotes finished the 2017–18 season finished the season 26–9, 11–3 in Summit League play to finish in second place. They defeated Omaha and Denver to advance to the championship game of the Summit League where they lost to South Dakota State. They were invited to the College Basketball Invitational where they lost in the first round to North Texas.

== Roster ==
2018–19 South Dakota Coyotes men's basketball team
Players
Coaches

Pos.	#	Name	Height	Weight	Year	Hometown
G	0	Stanley Umude	6 ft 6 in (1.98 m)	195 lb (88 kg)	So	San Antonio, Texas
G	1	Jack Stensgard	6 ft 3 in (1.91 m)	180 lb (82 kg)	So	Inver Grove Heights, Minnesota
F	2	Simeon Jovic	6 ft 9 in (2.06 m)	210 lb (95 kg)	Fr	Novi Sad, Serbia
G	3	Triston Simpson	6 ft 2 in (1.88 m)	190 lb (86 kg)	Jr	Lincoln, Nebraska
G	5	Isaiah Smith	6 ft 3 in (1.91 m)	200 lb (91 kg)	Fr	Omaha, Nebraska
G	10	Cody Kelley	5 ft 11 in (1.8 m)	190 lb (86 kg)	Jr	Gillette, Wyoming
G	11	Caden Hoffman	6 ft 0 in (1.83 m)	175 lb (79 kg)	Fr	Scottsdale, Arizona
F	12	Trey Burch-Manning	6 ft 6 in (1.98 m)	215 lb (98 kg)	Sr	Federal Way, Washington
F	13	Matt Johns	6 ft 8 in (2.03 m)	230 lb (104 kg)	Fr	Geelong, Australia
G	20	Brandon Armstrong	6 ft 5 in (1.96 m)	220 lb (100 kg)	Jr	San Antonio, Texas
G	22	Tyler Peterson	6 ft 4 in (1.93 m)	210 lb (95 kg)	Jr	Lino Lakes, Minnesota
G	24	Nathan Robinson	6 ft 4 in (1.93 m)	185 lb (84 kg)	Fr	Walnut Creek, California
F	25	Tyler Hagedorn	6 ft 10 in (2.08 m)	230 lb (104 kg)	Sr	Norfolk, Nebraska
F	31	Dan Jech	6 ft 9 in (2.06 m)	230 lb (104 kg)	Sr	Rochester, Minnesota
F	32	Jay Harvey	6 ft 9 in (2.06 m)	270 lb (122 kg)	Sr	Chicago, Illinois
F	33	Logan Power	6 ft 6 in (1.98 m)	230 lb (104 kg)	Sr	Lincoln, Nebraska

Head coach

- Todd Lee (South Dakota)

Assistant coach(es)

- Gameli Ahelegbe (Minnesota State)
- Brad Davidson (North Dakota)
- Luke DallaRiva (San Diego)

Legend

- (C) Team captain
- (S) Suspended
- (I) Ineligible
- (W) Walk-on
- Injured
- Current redshirt

Roster
Last update: 2018-10-31

== Schedule and results ==
Date time, TV	Rank^{#}	Opponent^{#}	Result	Record	Site (attendance) city, state
Exhibition
Oct 30, 2018*; 7:00 pm		Dakota Wesleyan	W 77–61		Sanford Coyote Sports Center (2,018); Vermillion, SD
Regular season
Nov 7, 2018*; 7:00 pm		York (NE)	W 83–58	1–0	Sanford Coyote Sports Center (1,785); Vermillion, SD
Nov 12, 2018*; 7:00 pm, ESPN+		Northern Arizona	W 90–74	2–0	Sanford Coyote Sports Center (1,692); Vermillion, SD
Nov 16, 2018*; 5:00 pm		vs. High Point; Bimini Jam semifinals	L 56–60	2–1	Gateway Christian Academy (565); Bimini, Bahamas
Nov 18, 2018*; 2:30 pm		vs. Air Force; Bimini Jam	L 62–65	2–2	Gateway Christian Academy (514); Bimini, Bahamas
Nov 19, 2018*; 7:30pm		vs. UMBC; Bimini Jam	W 58–52	3–2	Gateway Christian Academy (561); Bimini, Bahamas
Nov 27, 2018*; 7:00 pm, FSSW+		at Baylor	L 57–63	3–3	Ferrell Center (4,083); Waco, TX
Dec 1, 2018*; 3:30 pm, ESPN3		Cal State Bakersfield; WAC/Summit League Challenge	W 68–56	4–3	Sanford Coyote Sports Center (2,063); Vermillion, SD
Dec 4, 2018*; 8:00 pm, P12N		at Colorado	L 58–82	4–4	CU Events Center (6,462); Boulder, CO
Dec 8, 2018*; 1:00 pm		UMKC	L 63–65	4–5	Sanford Coyote Sports Center (1,827); Vermillion, SD
Dec 12, 2018*; 7:00 pm		Bellevue	W 78–52	5–5	Sanford Coyote Sports Center (1,569); Vermillion, SD
Dec 16, 2018*; 3:00 pm		at Colorado State	W 68–63	6–5	Moby Arena (2,302); Fort Collins, CO
Dec 18, 2018*; 7:00 pm, ESPN+		at No. 1 Kansas	L 53–89	6–6	Allen Fieldhouse (16,300); Lawrence, KS
Dec 21, 2018*; 7:00 pm		Southern Miss	L 60–66	6–7	Sanford Coyote Sports Center (1,750); Vermillion, SD
Summit League regular season
Dec 28, 2018; 8:00 pm		at North Dakota State; Postponed (inclement weather), Make-up December 29			Scheels Arena; Fargo, ND
Dec 29, 2018; 12:00 pm, MidcoSN/ESPN+		at North Dakota State	L 65–71	6–8 (0–1)	Scheels Arena (2,192); Fargo, ND
Jan 2, 2019; 8:00 pm, ALT		at Denver	W 71–70	7–8 (1–1)	Magness Arena (1,233); Denver, CO
Jan 6, 2019; 3:30 pm, MidcoSN/ESPN+		South Dakota State	L 61–79	7–9 (1–2)	Sanford Coyote Sports Center (6,014); Vermillion, SD
Jan 13, 2019; 1:00 pm, MidcoSN/ESPN3		Purdue Fort Wayne	W 87–73	8–9 (2–2)	Sanford Coyote Sports Center (1,800); Vermillion, SD
Jan 17, 2019; 7:00 pm, ESPN+		at Oral Roberts	L 74–77	8–10 (2–3)	Mabee Center (2,027); Tulsa, OK
Jan 20, 2019; 6:00 pm, MidcoSN/ESPN+		at Omaha	L 68–75	8–11 (2–4)	Baxter Arena (2,132); Omaha, NE
Jan 23, 2019; 7:00 pm, MidcoSN/ESPN+		at North Dakota	W 70–50	9–11 (3–4)	Betty Engelstad Sioux Center (1,532); Grand Forks, ND
Jan 26, 2019; 3:30 p.m., MidcoSN/ESPN3		Western Illinois	L 59–65	9–12 (3–5)	Sanford Coyote Sports Center (2,702); Vermillion, SD
Jan 30, 2019; 6:00 pm		at Purdue Fort Wayne	L 71–102	9–13 (3–6)	Memorial Coliseum (539); Fort Wayne, IN
Feb 7, 2019; 7:00 pm, MidcoSN2/ESPN+		vs. Omaha	L 102–107 ^{OT}	9–14 (3–7)	Sanford Pentagon; Sioux Falls, SD
Feb 10, 2019; 1:00 pm, MidcoSN/ESPN3		Oral Roberts	L 72–86	9–15 (3–8)	Sanford Coyote Sports Center; Vermillion, SD
Feb 16, 2019; 2:00 pm, ESPN3		at Western Illinois	W 80-67	10-15 (4-8)	Western Hall (591); Macomb, IL
Feb 20, 2019; 7:00 pm, MidcoSN/ESPN+		Denver	W 72-45	11-15 (5-8)	Sanford Coyote Sports Center (1,976); Vermillion, SD
Feb 23, 2019; 4:00 pm, MidcoSN/ESPN+		at South Dakota State	L 89-94	11-16 (5-9)	Frost Arena (4,614); Brookings, SD
Feb 28, 2019; 8:00 pm, MidcoSN/ESPN+		North Dakota State	W 75-65	12-16 (6-9)	Sanford Coyote Sports Center (2,482); Vermillion, SD
Mar 2, 2019; 3:30 pm, MidcoSN2/ESPN+		North Dakota	W 78-63	13-16 (7-9)	Sanford Coyote Sports Center (2,573); Vermillion, SD
The Summit League tournament
Mar 9, 2019; 8:30pm, ESPN+	(6)	vs. (3) Purdue Fort Wayne; Quarterfinals	L 70-96	13-17	Premier Center; Sioux Falls, SD
*Non-conference game. ^{#}Rankings from AP Poll. (#) Tournament seedings in parentheses. All times are in Central Time.
