= 2018–19 North Dakota Fighting Hawks men's basketball team =

American college basketball season

2018–19 North Dakota Fighting Hawks men's basketball
- Conference: Summit League
- Record: 12–18 (6–10 The Summit)
- Head coach: Brian Jones (13th season)
- Assistant coaches: Steve Grabowski; Craig Heatherly; Dani Mihalovic
- Home arena: Betty Engelstad Sioux Center

2018–19 Summit League men's basketball standings
	Conf.				Overall
Team	W		L	PCT	W		L	PCT
South Dakota State	14	–	2	.875	24	–	9	.727
Omaha	13	–	3	.813	21	–	11	.656
Purdue Fort Wayne	9	–	7	.563	18	–	15	.545
North Dakota State †	9	–	7	.563	19	–	16	.543
Oral Roberts	7	–	9	.438	11	–	21	.344
South Dakota	7	–	9	.438	13	–	17	.433
North Dakota	6	–	10	.375	12	–	18	.400
Western Illinois	4	–	12	.250	10	–	21	.323
Denver	3	–	13	.188	8	–	22	.267
† 2019 Summit League tournament winner

The 2018–19 North Dakota Fighting Hawks men's basketball team represented the University of North Dakota during the 2018–19 NCAA Division I men's basketball season. The Fighting Hawks, led by 13th-year head coach Brian Jones, played their home games at the Betty Engelstad Sioux Center in Grand Forks, North Dakota as first-year members of the Summit League. They finished the season 12–18 overall, 6–10 in Summit League play, to finish in 7th place. In the Summit League tournament, they were defeated by Omaha in the quarterfinals.

On May 1, 2019, it was announced that head coach Brian Jones was stepping down, in order to take the associate head coaching position at Illinois State. On May 30, head coach of DII Northern State, Paul Sather, was announced as Jones' replacement.

== Previous season ==
The Fighting Hawks finished the 2017–18 season 12–20, 6–12 in Big Sky play to finish in a tie for eighth place. They defeated Montana State in the first round of the Big Sky tournament before losing in the quarterfinals to Montana.

This season was the last for North Dakota as a full Big Sky member. On July 1, 2018, the school joined the Summit League in all sports except for football. The football team is playing the 2018 and 2019 seasons as an FCS independent, but will play a full Big Sky schedule in both seasons, after which it will join the Missouri Valley Football Conference.

== Roster ==
2018–19 North Dakota Fighting Hawks men's basketball team
Players
Coaches

Pos.	#	Name	Height	Weight	Year	Hometown
G	1	Marlon Stewart	6 ft 3 in (1.91 m)	200 lb (91 kg)	RS Jr	Eldridge, Iowa
G	3	Billy Brown	6 ft 3 in (1.91 m)	195 lb (88 kg)	Jr	Spirit Lake, Iowa
G	4	Davids Atelbauers	6 ft 1 in (1.85 m)	170 lb (77 kg)	Jr	Ogre, Latvia
F	5	Zac Saddler	6 ft 7 in (2.01 m)	210 lb (95 kg)	RS So	New Braunfels, Texas
G	10	Aanen Moody	6 ft 3 in (1.91 m)	175 lb (79 kg)	RS Fr	Dickinson, North Dakota
G	11	Bentiu Panoam	6 ft 2 in (1.88 m)	150 lb (68 kg)	So	Anchorage, Alaska
F/C	12	Filip Rebrača	6 ft 9 in (2.06 m)	210 lb (95 kg)	So	Sombor, Serbia
F	13	Marko Coudreau	6 ft 9 in (2.06 m)	220 lb (100 kg)	RS Fr	Marseille, France
G	15	Cortez Seales	6 ft 4 in (1.93 m)	190 lb (86 kg)	Sr	Eldridge, Iowa
F	20	Jal Bijiek	6 ft 7 in (2.01 m)	165 lb (75 kg)	Fr	Des Moines, Iowa
G	21	Ethan Igbanugo	6 ft 2 in (1.88 m)	185 lb (84 kg)	RS Fr	Lakeville, Minnesota
F	22	Carter Brooks	6 ft 7 in (2.01 m)	210 lb (95 kg)	RS So	Lakeville, Minnesota
F	23	Kienan Walter	6 ft 9 in (2.06 m)	195 lb (88 kg)	Jr	Vancouver, Washington
F	24	Elijah Hazekamp	6 ft 6 in (1.98 m)	205 lb (93 kg)	Fr	Sioux City, Iowa
F	32	Conner Avants	6 ft 7 in (2.01 m)	235 lb (107 kg)	Sr	Edmond, Oklahoma
C	50	Lucas Schmidt	6 ft 10 in (2.08 m)	235 lb (107 kg)	Fr	Watsonville, California

Head coach

- Brian Jones (Northern Iowa)

Assistant coach(es)

- Steve Grabowski (Minot State)
- Craig Heatherly (UMass Lowell)
- Dani Mihalovic

Legend

- (C) Team captain
- (S) Suspended
- (I) Ineligible
- (W) Walk-on
- Injured
- Current redshirt

Roster
Last update: October 30, 2018

== Schedule and results ==
Date time, TV	Rank^{#}	Opponent^{#}	Result	Record	Site (attendance) city, state
Non-conference regular season
Nov 6, 2018*; 7:00 pm, FCS		Northland	W 104–48	1–0	Betty Engelstad Sioux Center (1,412); Grand Forks, ND
Nov 10, 2018*; 6:00 pm, ESPN3		at Milwaukee	W 63–60	2–0	UW–Milwaukee Panther Arena (2,165); Milwaukee, WI
Nov 14, 2018*; 8:00 pm, SECN		at No. 10 Kentucky; Ohio Valley Hardwood Showcase	L 58–96	2–1	Rupp Arena (18,555); Lexington, KY
Nov 17, 2018*; 3:00 pm, FS North Plus		Minnesota Morris; Ohio Valley Hardwood Showcase	W 112–58	3–1	Betty Engelstad Sioux Center (1,665); Grand Forks, ND
Nov 20, 2018*; 7:00 pm, FS North		Concordia (NE); Ohio Valley Hardwood Showcase	W 89–56	4–1	Betty Engelstad Sioux Center (1,374); Grand Forks, ND
Nov 24, 2018*; 5:00 pm, WAC Network		at Utah Valley	L 68–74	4–2	UCCU Center (1,938); Orem, UT
Nov 27, 2018*; 8:00 pm		at Montana State; Big Sky/Summit Challenge	L 76–81	4–3	Brick Breeden Fieldhouse (2,527); Bozeman, MT
Dec 1, 2018*; 3:00 pm, FS North Plus		Idaho; Big Sky/Summit Challenge	L 54–67	4–4	Betty Engelstad Sioux Center (1,684); Grand Forks, ND
Dec 5, 2018*; 7:00 pm, FS North Plus		at Texas–Rio Grande Valley; WAC/Summit League Challenge	L 56–70	4–5	UTRGV Fieldhouse (527); Edinburg, TX
Dec 9, 2018*; 3:00 pm, FS North		Milwaukee	W 83–72	5–5	Betty Engelstad Sioux Center (1,547); Grand Forks, ND
Dec 14, 2018*; 7:00 pm, FS North		Mayville State	W 83–66	6–5	Betty Engelstad Sioux Center (1,472); Grand Forks, ND
Dec 18, 2018*; 8:00 pm, FSN		at No. 20 Marquette	L 66–92	6–6	Fiserv Forum (13,603); Milwaukee, WI
Dec 22, 2018*; 1:00 pm, ESPN+		at Northern Iowa	L 62–64	6–7	McLeod Center (3,619); Cedar Falls, IA
Summit League regular season
Dec 28, 2018; 7:00 pm		Purdue Fort Wayne; Postponed (inclement weather), Make-up December 29			Betty Engelstad Sioux Center; Grand Forks, ND
Dec 29, 2018; 12:00 pm, MidcoSN2/FCS		Purdue Fort Wayne	L 73–84	6–8 (0–1)	Betty Engelstad Sioux Center (1,442); Grand Forks, ND
Jan 3, 2019; 7:00 pm		at Oral Roberts	L 72–83	6–9 (0–2)	Mabee Center (2,006); Tulsa, OK
Jan 5, 2019; 2:00 pm, ALT2		at Denver	W 80–59	7–9 (1–2)	Magness Arena (1,918); Denver, CO
Jan 10, 2018; 7:00 pm, MidcoSN/FCS		Omaha	L 91–92	7–10 (1–3)	Betty Engelstad Sioux Center (1,525); Grand Forks, ND
Jan 12, 2018; 2:00 pm, MidcoSN2/FCS		Western Illinois	W 71–65	8–10 (2–3)	Betty Engelstad Sioux Center (1,898); Grand Forks, ND
Jan 16, 2018; 7:00 pm, MidcoSN/FCS		South Dakota State	L 74–78	8–11 (2–4)	Betty Engelstad Sioux Center (1,880); Grand Forks, ND
Jan 19, 2019; 2:00 pm, MidcoSN		at North Dakota State	L 65–67	8–12 (2–5)	Scheels Center (4,232); Fargo, ND
Jan 23, 2018; 7:00 pm, MidcoSN/FCS		South Dakota	L 56–70	8–13 (2–6)	Betty Engelstad Sioux Center (1,532); Grand Forks, ND
Feb 1, 2019; 4:30 pm, ESPN3		at Western Illinois	W 74–73	9–13 (3–6)	Western Hall (476); Macomb, IL
Feb 3, 2019; 12:00 pm, MidcoSN		at Omaha	L 72–90	9–14 (3–7)	Baxter Arena (2,054); Omaha, NE
Feb 6, 2018; 7:00 pm, MidcoSN/FCS		North Dakota State	L 70-74	9-15 (3-8)	Betty Engelstad Sioux Center (2,016); Grand Forks, ND
Feb 9, 2019; 4:15 pm, MidcoSN		at South Dakota State	L 55-80	9-16 (3-9)	Frost Arena (3,541); Brookings, SD
Feb 16, 2018; 7:00 pm, MidcoSN2/FCS		Oral Roberts	W 85-73	10-16 (4-9)	Betty Engelstad Sioux Center (1,764); Grand Forks, ND
Feb 23, 2018; 3:00 pm, FS North Plus		Denver	W 81-63	11-16 (5-9)	Betty Engelstad Sioux Center (1,946); Grand Forks, ND
Feb 28, 2019; 7:30 pm, MidcoSN		at Purdue Fort Wayne	W 88-82	12-16 (6-9)	Gates Sports Center (943); Fort Wayne, IN
Mar 2, 2019; 3:30 pm, MidcoSN2		at South Dakota	L 63-78	12-17 (6-10)	Sanford Coyote Sports Center (2,573); Vermillion, SD
The Summit League tournament
Mar 9, 2019; 8:30pm, MidcoSN	(6)	vs. (3) Omaha; Quarterfinals	L 76-81	12-18	Premier Center; Sioux Falls, SD
*Non-conference game. ^{#}Rankings from AP Poll. (#) Tournament seedings in parentheses. All times are in Central Time.
