= 2019 Summit League men's basketball tournament =

- Classification: Division I
- Season: 2018–19
- Teams: 8
- Site: Denny Sanford Premier Center; Sioux Falls, South Dakota
- Champions: North Dakota State (4th title)
- Winning coach: David Richman (2nd title)
- MVP: Vinnie Shahid (North Dakota State)
- Television: ESPN2

2018–19 Summit League men's basketball standings
	Conf.				Overall
Team	W		L	PCT	W		L	PCT
South Dakota State	14	–	2	.875	24	–	9	.727
Omaha	13	–	3	.813	21	–	11	.656
Purdue Fort Wayne	9	–	7	.563	18	–	15	.545
North Dakota State †	9	–	7	.563	19	–	16	.543
Oral Roberts	7	–	9	.438	11	–	21	.344
South Dakota	7	–	9	.438	13	–	17	.433
North Dakota	6	–	10	.375	12	–	18	.400
Western Illinois	4	–	12	.250	10	–	21	.323
Denver	3	–	13	.188	8	–	22	.267
† 2019 Summit League tournament winner

The 2019 Summit League men's basketball tournament was the postseason men's basketball tournament for the Summit League for the 2018-19 season. All tournament games were played at the Denny Sanford Premier Center in Sioux Falls, South Dakota, from March 9–12, 2019. Fourth seeded North Dakota State defeated second seeded Omaha 73–63 in the championship game to win the conference tournament championship, and received the conference's automatic bid to the 2019 NCAA tournament.

== Seeds ==
The top eight teams by conference record in the Summit League are eligible to compete in the conference tournament. Teams are seeded by record within the conference, with a tiebreaker system to seed teams with identical conference records.

Seed	School	Conf. record	Tiebreaker(s)
1	South Dakota State	14–2	
2	Omaha	13–3	
3	Purdue Fort Wayne	9–7	1–1 vs. NDSU; 1–1 vs. SDSU
4	North Dakota State	9–7	1–1 vs. PFW; 0–2 vs SDSU
5	Oral Roberts	7–9	2–0 vs. USD
6	South Dakota	7–9	0–2 vs. ORU
7	North Dakota	6–10	
8	Western Illinois	4–12	

== Schedule and results ==
Game	Time	Matchup	Score	Television
Quarterfinals – Saturday, March 9
1	6:00 pm	No. 1 South Dakota State vs. No. 8 Western Illinois	76–79	
2	8:30 pm	No. 2 Omaha vs. No. 7 North Dakota	81–76	
Quarterfinals – Sunday, March 10
3	6:00 pm	No. 4 North Dakota State vs. No. 5 Oral Roberts	86–73	
4	8:30 pm	No. 3 Purdue Fort Wayne vs. No. 6 South Dakota	96–70	
Semifinals – Monday, March 11
5	6:00 pm	No. 8 Western Illinois vs. No. 4 North Dakota State	73–76	
6	8:30 pm	No. 2 Omaha vs. No. 3 Purdue Fort Wayne	61–60	
Final – Tuesday, March 12
7	8:00 pm	No. 4 North Dakota State vs. No. 2 Omaha	73–63	ESPN2
*Game times in CST for March 9 quarterfinals, and CDT for March 10 quarterfinals onward. Rankings denote tournament seed

== Bracket ==
Quarterfinals; March 9 & 10
1	South Dakota State	76
8	Western Illinois	79
4	North Dakota State	86
5	Oral Roberts	73
2	Omaha	81
7	North Dakota	76
3	Purdue Fort Wayne	96
6	South Dakota	70

Semifinals; March 11
8	Western Illinois	73
4	North Dakota State	76
2	Omaha	61
3	Purdue Fort Wayne	60

Final; March 12
4	North Dakota State	73
2	Omaha	63

== All-Tournament Team ==
The following players were named to the All-Tournament Team:

Player	School
Vinnie Shahid (MVP)	North Dakota State
Tyson Ward	North Dakota State
Mitch Hahn	Omaha
Zach Jackson	Omaha
John Konchar	Purdue Fort Wayne
