= 2018–19 Oral Roberts Golden Eagles men's basketball team =

American college basketball season

2018–19 Oral Roberts Golden Eagles men's basketball
- Conference: Summit League
- Record: 11–21 (7–9 Summit)
- Head coach: Paul Mills (2nd season)
- Assistant coaches: Solomon Bozeman; Russell Springmann; Sam Patterson
- Home arena: Mabee Center

2018–19 Summit League men's basketball standings
	Conf.				Overall
Team	W		L	PCT	W		L	PCT
South Dakota State	14	–	2	.875	24	–	9	.727
Omaha	13	–	3	.813	21	–	11	.656
Purdue Fort Wayne	9	–	7	.563	18	–	15	.545
North Dakota State †	9	–	7	.563	19	–	16	.543
Oral Roberts	7	–	9	.438	11	–	21	.344
South Dakota	7	–	9	.438	13	–	17	.433
North Dakota	6	–	10	.375	12	–	18	.400
Western Illinois	4	–	12	.250	10	–	21	.323
Denver	3	–	13	.188	8	–	22	.267
† 2019 Summit League tournament winner

The 2018–19 Oral Roberts Golden Eagles men's basketball team represented Oral Roberts University during the 2018–19 NCAA Division I men's basketball season. The Golden Eagles were led by second-year head coach Paul Mills and played their home games at the Mabee Center in Tulsa, Oklahoma as members of The Summit League.

== Previous season ==
The Golden Eagles finished the season 11–21, 5–9 in Summit League, play to finish in a tie for fifth place. They lost in the quarterfinals of the Summit League tournament to Denver.

== Roster ==
2018–19 Oral Roberts Golden Eagles men's basketball team
Players
Coaches

Pos.	#	Name	Height	Weight	Year	Hometown
G	0	Kevin Obanor	6 ft 8 in (2.03 m)	225 lb (102 kg)	RS Fr	Houston, TX
G	1	Kennedy Milton	6 ft 1 in (1.85 m)	175 lb (79 kg)	Fr	Dallas, TX
G	10	Sam Kearns	6 ft 0 in (1.83 m)	190 lb (86 kg)	Jr	San Antonio, TX
G	11	Carlos Jürgens	6 ft 5 in (1.96 m)	175 lb (79 kg)	Fr	Tartu, Estonia
G	12	R.J. Faqua	5 ft 11 in (1.8 m)	170 lb (77 kg)	So	Tulsa, Oklahoma
G	13	Aidan Saunders	6 ft 4 in (1.93 m)	185 lb (84 kg)	Jr	Lithonia, GA
F	14	D.J. Weaver	6 ft 8 in (2.03 m)	190 lb (86 kg)	Fr	Houston, TX
F	21	Kerwin Smith	6 ft 10 in (2.08 m)	214 lb (97 kg)	RS Sr	Dallas, TX
F	22	Francis Lācis	6 ft 7 in (2.01 m)	200 lb (91 kg)	RS Fr	Riga, Latvia
F	23	Emmanuel Nzekwesi	6 ft 8 in (2.03 m)	230 lb (104 kg)	RS Jr	Trophy Club, TX
F	33	Emir Ahmedic	6 ft 8 in (2.03 m)	250 lb (113 kg)	RS So	Kladanj, Bosnia and Herzegovina
F	34	Chris Miller	6 ft 8 in (2.03 m)	255 lb (116 kg)	Jr	Tulsa, OK

Head coach

- Paul Mills (Texas A&M)

Assistant coach(es)

- Solomon Bozeman (Little Rock)
- Russell Springmann (Salisbury)
- Sam Patterson (Baylor)

Legend

- (C) Team captain
- (S) Suspended
- (I) Ineligible
- (W) Walk-on
- Injured
- Current redshirt

Roster

== Schedule and results ==
Date time, TV	Rank^{#}	Opponent^{#}	Result	Record	Site (attendance) city, state
Regular season
Nov 6, 2018*; 7:00 pm, ESPN3		at Missouri State	L 50–84	0–1	JQH Arena (5,014); Springfield, MO
Nov 9, 2018*; 7:00 pm		Southwestern (KS)	W 79–62	1–1	Mabee Center (2,157); Tulsa, OK
Nov 11, 2018*; 4:05 pm, FSSW		at No. 20 TCU	L 62–79	1–2	Schollmaier Arena (6,368); Fort Worth, TX
Nov 13, 2018*; 7:00 pm		California Baptist; Summit/WAC Challenge	L 69–70	1–3	Mabee Center (1,792); Tulsa, OK
Nov 15, 2018*; 8:00 pm, BYUtv		at BYU	L 65–85	1–4	Marriott Center (10,179); Provo, UT
Nov 19, 2018*; 7:00 pm		Ecclesia; Men Against Breast Cancer Hoops Challenge	W 109–72	2–4	Mabee Center (1,780); Tulsa, OK
Nov 23, 2018*; 11:00 am		vs. Northern Illinois; Men Against Breast Cancer Hoops Challenge	L 66–87	2–5	Athletics Center O'rena (1,821); Rochester, MI
Nov 24, 2018*; 1:30 pm, ESPN+		at Oakland; Men Against Breast Cancer Hoops Challenge	L 76–87	2–6	Athletics Center O'rena (1,610); Rochester, MI
Nov 25, 2018*; 11:00 am		vs. James Madison; Men Against Breast Cancer Hoops Challenge	W 78–69 ^{OT}	3–6	Athletics Center O'rena (2,093); Rochester, MI
Dec 2, 2018*; 2:00 pm, ESPN3		at SMU	L 67–79	3–7	Moody Coliseum (5,627); Dallas, TX
Dec 5, 2018*; 7:00 pm, KGEB TV-53/ESPN+		Florida Gulf Coast	L 76–96	3–8	Mabee Center (1,831); Tulsa, OK
Dec 7, 2018*; 6:00 pm, SECN		at Missouri	L 64–80	3–9	Mizzou Arena (9,813); Columbia, MO
Dec 15, 2018*; 3:00 pm, ESPN+		at Richmond	W 59–52	4–9	Robins Center (5,107); Richmond, VA
Dec 19, 2018*; 7:00 pm, Cox Yurview		at Wichita State	L 63–84	4–10	Charles Koch Arena (10,156); Wichita, KS
Dec 22, 2018*; 7:00 pm		Tulsa; Mayor's Cup	L 59–69	4–11	Mabee Center (4,102); Tulsa, OK
The Summit League regular season
Dec 30, 2018; 4:30 pm		at Omaha	W 87–84	5–11 (1–0)	Baxter Arena (1,764); Omaha, NE
Jan 03, 2019; 7:00 pm		North Dakota	W 83–72	6–11 (2–0)	Mabee Center (2,006); Tulsa, OK
Jan 05, 2019; 7:00 pm		Western Illinois	W 82–63	7–11 (3–0)	Mabee Center (2,010); Tulsa, OK
Jan 10, 2019; 6:00 pm		at Purdue Fort Wayne	L 69–94	7–12 (3–1)	Memorial Coliseum (1,538); Fort Wayne, IN
Jan 12, 2019; 4:15 pm, MidcoSN/ESPN3		at South Dakota State	L 65–84	7–13 (3–2)	Frost Arena (3,680); Brookings, SD
Jan 17, 2019; 7:00 pm, KGEB TV-53/ESPN+		South Dakota	W 77–74	8–13 (4–2)	Mabee Center (2,027); Tulsa, OK
Jan 20, 2019; 5:00 pm, ALT2		at Denver	L 58–74	8–14 (4–3)	Magness Arena (420); Denver, CO
Jan 26, 2019; 7:00 pm, KGEB TV-53/ESPN+		North Dakota State	L 57–67	8–15 (4–4)	Mabee Center (2,717); Tulsa, OK
Jan 31, 2019; 7:00 pm, KGEB TV-53/ESPN+		South Dakota State	L 80–86	8–16 (4–5)	Mabee Center (2,287); Tulsa, OK
Feb 02, 2019; 7:00 pm		Purdue Fort Wayne	L 81–82	8–17 (4–6)	Mabee Center (2,251); Tulsa, OK
Feb 07, 2019; 7:00 pm, KGEB TV-53/ESPN+		Denver	W 78–65	9–17 (5–6)	Mabee Center; Tulsa, OK
Feb 10, 2019; 1:00 pm, MidcoSN/ESPN3		at South Dakota	W 86–72	10–17 (6–6)	Sanford Coyote Sports Center; Vermillion, SD
Feb 14, 2019; 7:00 pm, MidcoSN/ESPN3		at North Dakota State	L 73–85	10–18 (6–7)	Scheels Center; Fargo, ND
Feb 16, 2019; 7:00 pm, MidcoSN/ESPN3		at North Dakota	L 73–85	10–19 (6–8)	Betty Engelstad Sioux Center; Grand Forks, ND
Feb 23, 2019; 7:00 pm, ESPN3		Western Illinois	W 75-66	10-20 (7-8)	Western Hall (572); Macomb, IL
Feb 28, 2019; 7:30 pm, KGEB TV-53/ESPN+		Omaha	W 84-80	11-20 (7-9)	Mabee Center (2,139); Tulsa, OK
Summit League tournament
Mar 10, 2019; 6pm, ESPN+/MidcoSN	(5)	vs. (4) North Dakota State	W 86-73	11-21	Premier Center; Sioux Falls, SD
*Non-conference game. ^{#}Rankings from AP poll. (#) Tournament seedings in parentheses. All times are in Central Time Source.
