= 2018–19 Western Illinois Leathernecks men's basketball team =

American college basketball season

2018–19 Western Illinois Leathernecks men's basketball
- Conference: Summit League
- Record: 10–21 (4–12 The Summit)
- Head coach: Billy Wright (5th season)
- Assistant coaches: Josh Wolfe; Jestin Anderson; Joshua Jones
- Home arena: Western Hall

2018–19 Summit League men's basketball standings
	Conf.				Overall
Team	W		L	PCT	W		L	PCT
South Dakota State	14	–	2	.875	24	–	9	.727
Omaha	13	–	3	.813	21	–	11	.656
Purdue Fort Wayne	9	–	7	.563	18	–	15	.545
North Dakota State †	9	–	7	.563	19	–	16	.543
Oral Roberts	7	–	9	.438	11	–	21	.344
South Dakota	7	–	9	.438	13	–	17	.433
North Dakota	6	–	10	.375	12	–	18	.400
Western Illinois	4	–	12	.250	10	–	21	.323
Denver	3	–	13	.188	8	–	22	.267
† 2019 Summit League tournament winner

The 2018–19 Western Illinois Leathernecks men's basketball team represented Western Illinois University during the 2018–19 NCAA Division I men's basketball season. The Leathernecks, led by fifth-year head coach Billy Wright, played their home games at Western Hall in Macomb, Illinois as members of the Summit League. They finished the season 10–21, 4–12 in Summit League play to finish in 8th place. They beat top-seeded South Dakota State in the quarterfinals of the Summit League tournament, before losing to North Dakota State in the semifinals.

== Previous season ==
The Leathernecks finished the season 12–16, 3–11 in Summit League play to finish in last place. They lost in the quarterfinals of the Summit League tournament to South Dakota.

== Roster ==
2018–19 Western Illinois Leathernecks men's basketball team
Players
Coaches

Pos.	#	Name	Height	Weight	Year	Hometown
G	1	Zion Young	6 ft 4 in (1.93 m)	190 lb (86 kg)	Fr	Chicago, illinois
G	10	Kobe Webster	6 ft 0 in (1.83 m)	160 lb (73 kg)	So	Indianapolis, Indiana
G	12	Otis Dortch	5 ft 10 in (1.78 m)	160 lb (73 kg)	Sr	Chicago, Illinois
G	14	Perion Little	6 ft 4 in (1.93 m)	185 lb (84 kg)	Jr	Kenosha, Wisconsin
F	15	Ben Pyle	6 ft 7 in (2.01 m)	185 lb (84 kg)	Fr	McPherson, Kansas
G	20	Jermiah Usiosefe	6 ft 5 in (1.96 m)	200 lb (91 kg)	Jr	Hamilton, Ontario, Canada
G	22	Keshon Montague	6 ft 0 in (1.83 m)	170 lb (77 kg)	RS Jr	Brampton, Ontario, Canada
F	24	James Claar	6 ft 8 in (2.03 m)	215 lb (98 kg)	RS Jr	Bolingbrook, Illinois
G	25	Ryan Maas	6 ft 1 in (1.85 m)	185 lb (84 kg)	Sr	Pekin, Illinois
F	30	Jake Weyhrich	6 ft 7 in (2.01 m)	210 lb (95 kg)	So	Manito, Illinois
G	35	Isaac Johnson	6 ft 5 in (1.96 m)	205 lb (93 kg)	So	Minneapolis, Minnesota
G	40	C. J. Duff	6 ft 1 in (1.85 m)	190 lb (86 kg)	So	Waukegan, Illinois
C	44	Jordan Hughes	6 ft 10 in (2.08 m)	235 lb (107 kg)	Sr	Schaumburg, Illinois
C	52	Brandon Gilbeck	7 ft 0 in (2.13 m)	235 lb (107 kg)	Sr	Spring Green, Wisconsin

Head coach

- Billy Wright (Bradley)

Assistant coach(es)

- Josh Wolfe (Hope College)
- Jestin Anderson (Quincy)
- Joshua Jones (Eastern Kentucky)

Legend

- (C) Team captain
- (S) Suspended
- (I) Ineligible
- (W) Walk-on
- Injured
- Current redshirt

Roster
Last update: October 31, 2018

== Schedule and results ==
Date time, TV	Rank^{#}	Opponent^{#}	Result	Record	Site (attendance) city, state
Exhibition
Oct 29, 2018*; 7:00 pm		Knox	W 99–36		Western Hall (269); Macomb, IL
Nov 1, 2018*; 7:30 pm		Iowa Wesleyan	W 108–64		Western Hall; Macomb, IL
Non-conference regular season
Nov 6, 2018*; 7:30 pm, FSN		at Creighton	L 67–78	0–1	CHI Health Center Omaha (16,449); Omaha, NE
Nov 10, 2018*; 2:00 pm		North Park	W 84–56	1–1	Western Hall (487); Macomb, IL
Nov 14, 2018*; 7:00 pm		Dominican (IL)	W 95–56	2–1	Western Hall (394); Macomb, IL
Nov 17, 2018*; 7:00 pm		at Eastern Illinois	L 66–68 ^{OT}	2–2	Lantz Arena (696); Charleston, IL
Nov 21, 2018*; 3:30 pm		at UT Martin	L 90–92	2–3	Skyhawk Arena (1,005); Martin, TN
Nov 24, 2018*; 1:00 pm, BTN Plus		at Nebraska	L 49–73	2–4	Pinnacle Bank Arena (15,800); Lincoln, NE
Nov 28, 2018*; 7:00 pm		SIU Edwardsville	W 83–58	3–4	Western Hall (441); Macomb, IL
Dec 1, 2018*; 6:30 pm		at Southeast Missouri State	W 70–63	4–4	Show Me Center (821); Cape Girardeau, MO
Dec 5, 2018*; 6:00 pm		at Stetson	L 64–68	4–5	Edmunds Center (364); DeLand, FL
Dec 8, 2018*; 7:00 pm		Eastern Illinois	L 67–74	4–6	Western Hall (522); Macomb, IL
Dec 15, 2018*; 1:00 pm		at IUPUI	L 68–82	4–7	Indiana Farmers Coliseum (980); Indianapolis, IN
Dec 17, 2018*; 8:00 pm		at Northern Illinois	L 76–91	4–8	Convocation Center (1,012); DeKalb, IL
Dec 20, 2018*; 2:00 pm		Chicago State; WAC/Summit League Challenge	W 81–52	5–8	Western Hall (352); Macomb, IL
Summit League regular season
Dec 28, 2018; 4:30 pm		South Dakota State	L 58-100	5–9 (0–1)	Western Hall (441); Macomb, IL
Dec 30, 2018; 4:30 pm		Denver	W 78–60	6–9 (1–1)	Western Hall (342); Macomb, IL
Jan 5, 2019; 7:00 pm		at Oral Roberts	L 63–82	6–10 (1–2)	Mabee Center (2,101); Tulsa, OK
Jan 10, 2019; 7:00 pm, ESPN3		at North Dakota State	L 69–85	6–12 (1–3)	Scheels Center (2,461); Fargo, ND
Jan 12, 2019; 2:00 pm, ESPN+		at North Dakota	L 65–71	6–12 (1–4)	Betty Engelstad Sioux Center (1,898); Grand Forks, ND
Jan 17, 2019; 7:00 pm		Omaha	L 71–80	6–13 (1–5)	Western Hall (426); Macomb, IL
Jan 19, 2019; 7:00 pm		Purdue Fort Wayne	W 87–58	7–13 (2–5)	Western Hall (496); Macomb, IL
Jan 26, 2019; 3:30 pm, ESPN3		at South Dakota	W 65–59	8–13 (3–5)	Sanford Coyote Sports Center (2,702); Vermillion, SD
Feb 1, 2019; 4:30 pm, ESPN3		North Dakota	L 73–74	8–14 (3–6)	Western Hall (476); Macomb, IL
Feb 2, 2019; 7:00 pm, ESPN3		North Dakota State	L 76–78	8–15 (3–7)	Western Hall (521); Macomb, IL
Feb 7, 2019; 6:00 pm		at Purdue Fort Wayne	L 64-79	8-16 (3-8)	Gates Sports Center; Fort Wayne, IN
Feb 16, 2019; 2:00 pm, ESPN3		South Dakota	L 67-80	8-17 (3-9)	Western Hall (591); Macomb, IL
Feb 20, 2019; 7:00 pm		at Omaha	L 63-77	8-18 (3-10)	Baxter Arena (2,666); Omaha, NE
Feb 23, 2019; 7:00 pm, ESPN3		Oral Roberts	W 75-66	9-18 (4-10)	Western Hall (572); Macomb, IL
Feb 28, 2019; 8:00 pm		at Denver	L 46-74	9-19 (4-11)	Magness Arena (1,145); Denver, CO
Mar 2, 2019; 4:15 pm		at South Dakota State	L 66-86	9-20 (4-12)	Frost Arena (3,746); Brookings, SD
Summit League tournament
Mar 9,2019; 6pm, ESPN+	(8)	vs. (1) South Dakota State; Quarterfinals	W 79-76	10-20	Premier Center; Sioux Falls, SD
Mar 11,2019; 6pm, ESPN+	(8)	vs. (4) North Dakota State; Semifinals	L 73-76	10-21	Premier Center; Sioux Falls, SD
*Non-conference game. ^{#}Rankings from AP Poll. (#) Tournament seedings in parentheses. All times are in Central Time.
