= 2018–19 Denver Pioneers men's basketball team =

American college basketball season

2018–19 Denver Pioneers men's basketball
- Conference: The Summit League
- Record: 8–22 (3–13 The Summit)
- Head coach: Rodney Billups (3rd season)
- Assistant coaches: Ricardo Patton; Steve Snell; Dan Ficke
- Home arena: Magness Arena

2018–19 Summit League men's basketball standings
	Conf.				Overall
Team	W		L	PCT	W		L	PCT
South Dakota State	14	–	2	.875	24	–	9	.727
Omaha	13	–	3	.813	21	–	11	.656
Purdue Fort Wayne	9	–	7	.563	18	–	15	.545
North Dakota State †	9	–	7	.563	19	–	16	.543
Oral Roberts	7	–	9	.438	11	–	21	.344
South Dakota	7	–	9	.438	13	–	17	.433
North Dakota	6	–	10	.375	12	–	18	.400
Western Illinois	4	–	12	.250	10	–	21	.323
Denver	3	–	13	.188	8	–	22	.267
† 2019 Summit League tournament winner

The 2018–19 Denver Pioneers men's basketball team represented the University of Denver during the 2018–19 NCAA Division I men's basketball season. The Pioneers, led by third-year head coach Rodney Billups, played their home games at Magness Arena and are members of The Summit League. They finished the season 8–22, 3–13 in Summit League play to finish in last place. They failed to qualify for the 2019 Summit League tournament.

== Previous season ==
The Pioneers finished the season 15–15, 8–6 in Summit League play to finish in third place. In the Summit League tournament, they defeated Oral Roberts in the quarterfinals before losing to South Dakota State in the semifinals.

== Roster ==
2018–19 Denver Pioneers men's basketball team
Players
Coaches

Pos.	#	Name	Height	Weight	Year	Hometown
G	0	Ade Murkey	6 ft 5 in (1.96 m)	200 lb (91 kg)	Jr	Minneapolis, Minnesota
F	1	David Nzekwesi	6 ft 9 in (2.06 m)	240 lb (109 kg)	Fr	Fort Worth, Texas
G	2	Joe Rosga	6 ft 3 in (1.91 m)	175 lb (79 kg)	Sr	Saint Paul, Minnesota
G	3	Jase Townsend	6 ft 3 in (1.91 m)	175 lb (79 kg)	Fr	Dallas, Texas
G	4	Taelyr Gatlin	6 ft 3 in (1.91 m)	180 lb (82 kg)	Fr	Atoka, Tennessee
G	5	Elvin Rodriquez	6 ft 1 in (1.85 m)	180 lb (82 kg)	So	Harlem, New York
G	10	Joseph Lanzi	6 ft 5 in (1.96 m)	195 lb (88 kg)	Fr	Birmingham, Alabama
F	11	Jake Krafka	6 ft 7 in (2.01 m)	215 lb (98 kg)	Jr	Austin, Texas
F	12	Alperen Kurnaz	6 ft 8 in (2.03 m)	220 lb (100 kg)	Fr	Istanbul, Turkey
F	14	Tory Stewart-Miller	6 ft 9 in (2.06 m)	245 lb (111 kg)	Sr	Kansas City, Missouri
G	20	Drew Joiner	6 ft 3 in (1.91 m)	175 lb (79 kg)	Sr	Centennial, Colorado
G/F	25	Ronnie Harrell	6 ft 7 in (2.01 m)	200 lb (91 kg)	Sr	Denver, Colorado
F	30	Donoven Carlisle	6 ft 8 in (2.03 m)	210 lb (95 kg)	So	Indianapolis, Indiana
F	32	Abiola Akintola	6 ft 6 in (1.98 m)	220 lb (100 kg)	Sr	Melbourne, Australia

Head coach

- Rodney Billups (Denver)

Assistant coach(es)

- Ricardo Patton (Belmont)
- Steve Snell (Radford)
- Dan Ficke (Loyola (MD))

Legend

- (C) Team captain
- (S) Suspended
- (I) Ineligible
- (W) Walk-on
- Injured
- Current redshirt

Roster
Last update: August 26, 2018

== Schedule and results ==
Date time, TV	Rank^{#}	Opponent^{#}	Result	Record	Site (attendance) city, state
Non-conference regular season
Nov 6, 2018*; 7:00 pm, ALT		Maine	W 63–50	1–0	Magness Arena (1,822); Denver, CO
Nov 12, 2018*; 7:00 pm, FSKC/ESPN3		at No. 12 Kansas State	L 56–64	1–1	Bramlage Coliseum (9,412); Manhattan, KS
Nov 15, 2018*; 7:00 pm, ALT2		Abilene Christian	L 61–67	1–2	Magness Arena (804); Denver, CO
Nov 23, 2018*; 1:00 pm		at Seattle; Elgin Baylor Classic	L 63–82	1–3	Redhawk Center (883); Seattle, WA
Nov 24, 2018*; 1:00 pm		vs. Longwood; Elgin Baylor Classic	W 64–62	2–3	Redhawk Center (809); Seattle, WA
Nov 25, 2018*; 1:00 pm		vs. Fairfield; Elgin Baylor Classic	L 85-86	2-4	Redhawk Center (999); Seattle, WA
Nov 28, 2018*; 7:00 pm, ALT		Northern Colorado	L 72-88	2-5	Magness Arena (1,294); Denver, CO
Dec 1, 2018*; 7:00 pm		at Utah Valley; Summit/WAC Challenge	L 75-98	2-6	UCCU Center (2,613); Orem, UT
Dec 5, 2018*; 7:00 pm, MWN		at Air Force	L 65-73	2-7	Clune Arena (1,601); Colorado Springs, CO
Dec 9, 2018*; 1:00 pm		Western State	W 93–69	3–7	Magness Arena (842); Denver, CO
Dec 11, 2018*; 7:00 pm		at Wyoming	W 90–87 ^{OT}	4–7	Arena-Auditorium (3,422); Laramie, WY
Dec 15, 2018*; 8:00 pm		at UC Irvine	L 52–86	4–8	Bren Events Center (2,371); Irvine, CA
Dec 18, 2018*; 7:00 pm, ALT2		Montana State	W 76–64	5–8	Magness Arena (879); Denver, CO
Dec 21, 2018*; 7:00 pm, RTNW		at No. 8 Gonzaga	L 40–101	5–9	McCarthey Athletic Center (6,000); Spokane, WA
The Summit League regular season
Dec 28, 2018; 6:30 pm		at Omaha	L 84–91	5–10 (0–1)	Baxter Arena (2,090); Omaha, NE
Dec 30, 2018; 3:30 pm		at Western Illinois	L 60–78	5–11 (0–2)	Western Hall (342); Macomb, IL
Jan 2, 2019; 7:00 pm, ALT		South Dakota	L 70–71	5–12 (0–3)	Magness Arena (1,233); Denver, CO
Jan 5, 2019; 1:00 pm, ALT2		North Dakota	L 59–80	5–13 (0–4)	Magness Arena (1,918); Denver, CO
Jan 10, 2019; 6:00 pm		at South Dakota State	L 66–78	5–14 (0–5)	Frost Arena (2,505); Brookings, SD
Jan 16, 2019; 7:00 pm, ALT2		North Dakota State	W 80–65	6–14 (1–5)	Magness Arena (829); Denver, CO
Jan 20, 2019; 4:00 pm, ALT2		Oral Roberts	W 74–58	7–14 (2–5)	Magness Arena (420); Denver, CO
Jan 26, 2019; 5:00 pm		at Purdue Fort Wayne	L 81–91	7–15 (2–6)	Gates Sports Center (1,839); Fort Wayne, IN
Feb 3, 2019; 1:00 pm, ALT		South Dakota State	L 82–92	7–16 (2–7)	Magness Arena (1,641); Denver, CO
Feb 7, 2019; 6:00 pm		at Oral Roberts	L 65-78	7-17 (2-8)	Mabee Center (1,849); Tulsa, OK
Feb 9, 2019; 3:00 pm		at North Dakota State	L 71-81	7-18 (2-9)	Scheels Center (2,094); Fargo, ND
Feb 14, 2019; 7:00 pm, ALT2		Purdue Fort Wayne	L 81-94	7-19 (2-10)	Magness Arena (872); Denver, CO
Feb 20, 2019; 6:00 pm		at South Dakota	L 45-72	7-20 (2-11)	Sanford Coyote Sports Center (1,976); Vermillion, SD
Feb 23, 2019; 2:00 pm		at North Dakota	L 63-81	7-21 (2-12)	Betty Engelstad Sioux Center (1,946); Grand Forks, ND
Feb 28, 2019; 7:00 pm, ALT2		Western Illinois	W 74-46	8-21 (3-12)	Magness Arena (1,145); Denver, CO
Mar 2, 2019; 1:00 pm, ALT		Omaha	L 76-86	8-22 (3-13)	Magness Arena (1,773); Denver, CO
*Non-conference game. ^{#}Rankings from AP Poll. (#) Tournament seedings in parentheses. All times are in Mountain Time.

== Notable alumni ==
- Ronnie Harrell (born 1996), basketball player for Hapoel Gilboa Galil of the Israeli Basketball Premier League
