= 2018–19 Purdue Fort Wayne Mastodons men's basketball team =

American college basketball season

2018–19 Purdue Fort Wayne Mastodons men's basketball
- Conference: Summit League
- Record: 18–15 (9–7 The Summit)
- Head coach: Jon Coffman (5th season)
- Assistant coaches: Ryan Sims (9th season); Paul Corsaro (1st season); Adam Blaylock (1st season)
- Home arena: Gates Sports Center; Allen County War Memorial Coliseum

2018–19 Summit League men's basketball standings
	Conf.				Overall
Team	W		L	PCT	W		L	PCT
South Dakota State	14	–	2	.875	24	–	9	.727
Omaha	13	–	3	.813	21	–	11	.656
Purdue Fort Wayne	9	–	7	.563	18	–	15	.545
North Dakota State †	9	–	7	.563	19	–	16	.543
Oral Roberts	7	–	9	.438	11	–	21	.344
South Dakota	7	–	9	.438	13	–	17	.433
North Dakota	6	–	10	.375	12	–	18	.400
Western Illinois	4	–	12	.250	10	–	21	.323
Denver	3	–	13	.188	8	–	22	.267
† 2019 Summit League tournament winner

The 2018–19 Purdue Fort Wayne Mastodons men's basketball team represented Purdue University Fort Wayne during the 2018–19 NCAA Division I men's basketball season. The Mastodons were led by fifth-year head coach Jon Coffman and split their home games between the Gates Sports Center and the Allen County War Memorial Coliseum as members of the Summit League.

The season was the first in which Mastodons represented the new Purdue University Fort Wayne (PFW). The team previously represented the now defunct Indiana University – Purdue University Fort Wayne. On July 1, 2018, IPFW split into two separate institutions, with IU taking responsibility for IPFW's degree programs in health sciences and Purdue retaining all other academic programs. The Mastodons have since represented PFW. With the name change, the school's colors changed from Royal Blue and White to the Old Gold and Black used by the other three Purdue University campuses. On June 18, 2018, the school announced that beginning July 1, 2018 all NCAA sports teams would be known as the Purdue Fort Wayne Mastodons. In addition, a new logo was revealed where the color blue has been incorporated as a secondary color to the university's official school colors of gold and black.

== Previous season ==
The Mastodons finished the 2017–18 season 18–15, 7–7 in Summit League play to finish in fourth place. They lost in the quarterfinals of the Summit League tournament to North Dakota State. They were invited to the CollegeInsdier.com Tournament where they lost in the first round to Central Michigan.

The season was the last in which the Mastodons represented IPFW, using "Fort Wayne" as its athletic brand.

== Roster ==
2018–19 Purdue Fort Wayne Mastodons men's basketball team
Players
Coaches

Pos.	#	Name	Height	Weight	Year	Previous school	Hometown
F	0	Ramion Burt Jr.	6 ft 8 in (2.03 m)	220 lb (100 kg)	Jr	Green Tech Charter; Cloud County CC	Albany, NY
G	1	Jerred Godfrey	6 ft 5 in (1.96 m)	185 lb (84 kg)	Fr	Sandy Creek HS	Tyrone, GA
G	2	Brian Patrick	6 ft 5 in (1.96 m)	200 lb (91 kg)	Jr	Boyd Anderson HS; Kansas State	Fort Lauderdale, FL
G	5	Tionne Rollins	6 ft 2 in (1.88 m)	180 lb (82 kg)	Fr	Lincoln HS	Tallahassee, FL
G	10	Dee Montgomery	6 ft 0 in (1.83 m)	180 lb (82 kg)	Jr	Horn Lake HS; ASU-Mid South	Horn Lake, MS
G	11	Dylan Carl	6 ft 11 in (2.11 m)	225 lb (102 kg)	RS So	Alma HS	Alma, MI
F	13	Matt Holba	6 ft 7 in (2.01 m)	225 lb (102 kg)	RS Jr	St. Theodore Guerin HS; Lehigh	Noblesville, IN
G	15	Matt Havey	6 ft 1 in (1.85 m)	185 lb (84 kg)	RS Fr	Lansing Christian HS	Okemos, MI
F	31	Josh Inkumsah	6 ft 7 in (2.01 m)	265 lb (120 kg)	Fr	London Basketball Academy	Barrie, Ontario
G	32	Kason Harrell	6 ft 2 in (1.88 m)	192 lb (87 kg)	Sr	Hempfield HS	Pittsburgh, PA
G	33	Matt Weir	6 ft 1 in (1.85 m)	175 lb (79 kg)	So	John Glenn HS; US Air Force Prep Academy	New Concord, OH
F	34	Cameron Benford	6 ft 8 in (2.03 m)	240 lb (109 kg)	So	Franklin HS; Hillcrest Academy	Seattle, WA
F	35	Rylen Grundy	6 ft 5 in (1.96 m)	200 lb (91 kg)	Fr	James Whitcomb Riley HS	South Bend, IN
G	41	Marcus DeBerry	6 ft 5 in (1.96 m)	185 lb (84 kg)	RS Jr	Union City HS; Northern Arizona	Union City, TN
G	55	John Konchar	6 ft 5 in (1.96 m)	220 lb (100 kg)	RS Sr	West Chicago HS	West Chicago, IL

Head coach

Jon Coffman (Washington & Lee)

Assistant coach(es)

Ryan Sims (Indianapolis)
Paul Corsaro (Indianapolis)
Adam Blaylock (Peru State)

Legend

- (C) Team captain
- (S) Suspended
- (I) Ineligible
- (W) Walk-on
- Injured
- Current redshirt

Roster
Last update: 9/8/2018

== Schedule and results ==
Date time, TV	Rank^{#}	Opponent^{#}	Result	Record	Site (attendance) city, state
Exhibition
Oct 30, 2018*; 7:00 pm		DePauw	W 90–64		Gates Sports Center (850); Fort Wayne, IN
Non-conference regular season
Nov 6, 2018*; 9:00 pm, P12N		at No. 21 UCLA	L 71–96	0–1	Pauley Pavilion (5,931); Los Angeles, CA
Nov 8, 2018*; 7:00 pm		Earlham	W 112–51	1–1	Gates Sports Center (819); Fort Wayne, IN
Nov 11, 2018*; 4:00 pm, BTN		at Ohio State; Buckeye Basketball Classic	L 61–107	1–2	Value City Arena (12,040); Columbus, OH
Nov 13, 2018*; 7:00 pm, CN81		Manchester	W 111–65	2–2	Gates Sports Center (1,338); Fort Wayne, IN
Nov 16, 2018*; 7:00 pm		at Dayton	L 81–90	2–3	UD Arena (13,004); Dayton, OH
Nov 20, 2018*; 7:00 pm, CN81		South Carolina State; Buckeye Basketball Classic	W 72–68	3–3	Memorial Coliseum (1,330); Fort Wayne, IN
Nov 23, 2018*; 7:00 pm, CN81		Samford; Buckeye Basketball Classic	L 66–74	3–4	Memorial Coliseum (1,725); Fort Wayne, IN
Nov 25, 2018*; 5:00 pm		at Cleveland State; Buckeye Basketball Classic	W 82–79	4–4	Wolstein Center (777); Cleveland, OH
Nov 28, 2018*; 8:00 pm		at Eastern Illinois	W 104–60	5–4	Lantz Arena (1,016); Charleston, IL
Dec 1, 2018*; 2:00 pm, CN81		UMKC; Summit/WAC Challenge	L 73–90	5–5	Memorial Coliseum (1,389); Fort Wayne, IN
Dec 5, 2018*; 7:00 pm, CN81		Akron	W 68–65	6–5	Memorial Coliseum (1,274); Fort Wayne, IN
Dec 8, 2018*; 2:00 pm		at Miami (OH)	L 79–85	6–6	Millett Hall (1,451); Oxford, OH
Dec 15, 2018*; 5:00 pm, ESPN+		at Austin Peay	L 68–95	6–7	Dunn Center (1,344); Clarksville, TN
Dec 18, 2018*; 7:00 pm, CN81		IUPUI	W 87–77	7–7	Memorial Coliseum (1,984); Fort Wayne, IN
Dec 20, 2018*; 7:00 pm, CN81		Siena Heights	W 106–45	8–7	Memorial Coliseum (1,797); Fort Wayne, IN
Summit League regular season
Dec 28, 2018; 7:00 pm		at North Dakota; Postponed (inclement weather), Make-up December 29			Betty Engelstad Sioux Center; Grand Forks, ND
Dec 29, 2018; 1:00 pm		at North Dakota	W 84–73	9–7 (1–0)	Betty Engelstad Sioux Center (1,442); Grand Forks, ND
Dec 30, 2018; 5:00 pm		at North Dakota State	W 90–87 ^{OT}	10–7 (2–0)	Scheels Center (2,043); Fargo, ND
Jan 3, 2019; 7:30 pm, CN81		South Dakota State	W 104–88	11–7 (3–0)	Memorial Coliseum (1,803); Fort Wayne, IN
Jan 10, 2019; 7:00 pm, CN81		Oral Roberts	W 94–69	12–7 (4–0)	Memorial Coliseum (1,538); Fort Wayne, IN
Jan 13, 2019; 2:00 pm		at South Dakota	L 73–87	12–8 (4–1)	Sanford Coyote Sports Center (1,800); Vermillion, SD
Jan 19, 2019; 8:00 pm		at Western Illinois	L 58–87	12–9 (4–2)	Western Hall (496); Macomb, IL
Jan 24, 2019; 7:00 pm		Omaha	L 79–85	12–10 (4–3)	Gates Sports Center (1,125); Fort Wayne, IN
Jan 26, 2019; 7:00 pm		Denver	W 91–81	13–10 (5–3)	Gates Sports Center (1,839); Fort Wayne, IN
Jan 30, 2019; 7:00 pm		South Dakota	W 102–71	14–10 (6–3)	Gates Sports Center (539); Fort Wayne, IN
Feb 2, 2019; 8:00 pm		at Oral Roberts	W 82–81	15–10 (7–3)	Mabee Center (2,251); Tulsa, OK
Feb 7, 2019; 7:00 pm, CN81		Western Illinois	W 79–64	16–10 (8–3)	Memorial Coliseum; Fort Wayne, IN
Feb 14, 2019; 9:00 pm		at Denver	W 94–81	17–10 (9–3)	Magness Arena; Denver, CO
Feb 16, 2019; 5:30 pm		at Omaha	L 71–74	17–11 (9–4)	Baxter Arena; Omaha, NE
Feb 21, 2019; 8:00 pm		at South Dakota State	L 83–92	17–12 (9–5)	Frost Arena; Brookings, SD
Feb 28, 2019; 7:30 pm		North Dakota	L 82–88	17–13 (9–6)	Gates Sports Center; Fort Wayne, IN
Mar 2, 2019; 5:00 pm		North Dakota State	L 66–69	17–14 (9–7)	Gates Sports Center; Fort Wayne, IN
Summit League tournament
Mar 10, 2019; 8:30 pm, ESPN+	(3)	vs. (6) South Dakota; Quarterfinals	W 96–70	18–14	Premier Center (5,989); Sioux Falls, SD
Mar 11, 2019; 8:30 pm, ESPN+	(3)	vs. (2) Omaha; Semifinals	L 60–61	18–15	Premier Center (4,508); Sioux Falls, SD
*Non-conference game. ^{#}Rankings from AP Poll. (#) Tournament seedings in parentheses. All times are in Eastern Time.
