= Max Landis (basketball) =

American basketball player (born 1993)

Personal information
- Born: February 2, 1993 (age 33) Indianapolis, Indiana, U.S.
- Listed height: 6 ft 2 in (1.88 m)
- Listed weight: 195 lb (88 kg)

Career information
- High school: Perry Meridian (Indianapolis, Indiana)
- College: Gardner–Webb (2011–2013); Fort Wayne (2014–2016)
- NBA draft: 2016: undrafted
- Playing career: 2016–2025
- Position: Shooting guard
- Number: 11

Career history
- 2016–2017: Okapi Aalstar
- 2017–2019: Gießen 46ers
- 2019–2025: FC Porto
- 2025: El Calor de Cancún

Career highlights
- Portuguese League Cup winner (2021); 2× Portuguese Cup winner (2024, 2025); 2× Portuguese Supercup winner (2019, 2024); AP Honorable Mention All-American (2016); Summit League Player of the Year (2016); First-team AllSummit League (2016)

Max Landis (born February 2, 1993) is an American retired basketball player.

== College career ==
Landis attended Gardner-Webb for his first two years of college eligibility, then transferred to Indiana University–Purdue University Fort Wayne (IPFW) for his final two seasons. As a senior in the 2015–16 season, Landis was named the Summit League Player of the Year.

== Professional career ==
After a successful senior campaign, Landis conducted workouts with the Chicago Bulls, Milwaukee Bucks, Utah Jazz, and his hometown team Indiana Pacers. On June 15, 2016, Landis signed with Okapi Aalst of the Belgian Basketball League.

Following the 2016–17 campaign, Landis signed with the Giessen 46ers of the German Basketball Bundesliga.

On 29 June 2019, Landis signed with FC Porto of the Portuguese LPB. Landis was the league's 2024/25 season top scorer, with 448 points. During his six-season stay at Porto, he won a Portuguese Cup and two Supercups. His last stop in professional basketball was El Calor de Cancún in Mexico. Landis retired in 2025.
