= 2018–19 North Dakota State Bison men's basketball team =

American college basketball season

2018–19 North Dakota State Bison men's basketball

The Summit League tournament champions

NCAA tournament, First round
- Conference: Summit League
- Record: 19–16 (9–7 The Summit)
- Head coach: David Richman (5th season)
- Assistant coaches: Jayden Olson; Kyan Brown; Will Veasley
- Home arena: Scheels Center

2018–19 Summit League men's basketball standings
	Conf.				Overall
Team	W		L	PCT	W		L	PCT
South Dakota State	14	–	2	.875	24	–	9	.727
Omaha	13	–	3	.813	21	–	11	.656
Purdue Fort Wayne	9	–	7	.563	18	–	15	.545
North Dakota State †	9	–	7	.563	19	–	16	.543
Oral Roberts	7	–	9	.438	11	–	21	.344
South Dakota	7	–	9	.438	13	–	17	.433
North Dakota	6	–	10	.375	12	–	18	.400
Western Illinois	4	–	12	.250	10	–	21	.323
Denver	3	–	13	.188	8	–	22	.267
† 2019 Summit League tournament winner

The 2018–19 North Dakota State Bison men's basketball team represented North Dakota State University in the 2018–19 NCAA Division I men's basketball season. The Bison, led by fifth-year head coach David Richman, played their home games at the Scheels Center in Fargo, North Dakota as members of the Summit League. They finished the season 19–16, 9–7 in Summit League play, to finish in a tie for third place. As the No. 4 seed in the Summit League tournament, they defeated Oral Roberts, Western Illinois and Omaha to win the tournament championship. As a result, they received the conference's automatic bid to the NCAA tournament as the No. 16 seed in the East region. There the Bison lost to overall No. 1 seed Duke.

== Previous season ==
The Bison finished the season 15–17, 5–9 in Summit League play, to finish in a tie for fifth place. They defeated Fort Wayne in the quarterfinals of the Summit League tournament before losing in the semifinals to South Dakota State.

== Roster ==
2018–19 North Dakota State Bison men's basketball team
Players
Coaches

Pos.	#	Name	Height	Weight	Year	Hometown
G	0	Vinnie Shahid	5 ft 11 in (1.8 m)	185 lb (84 kg)	Jr	Minneapolis, MN
G	2	Jaxon Knotex	6 ft 5 in (1.96 m)	200 lb (91 kg)	Fr	River Falls, WI
G	3	Tyree Eady	6 ft 5 in (1.96 m)	215 lb (98 kg)	RS Fr	Middleton, WI
G/F	5	Sam Griesel	6 ft 6 in (1.98 m)	205 lb (93 kg)	Fr	Lincoln, NE
G	11	Jared Samuelson	6 ft 2 in (1.88 m)	185 lb (84 kg)	Jr	Gretna, NE
G	13	Chris Quayle	6 ft 5 in (1.96 m)	190 lb (86 kg)	Jr	Riverton, WY
G	21	Jarius Cook	6 ft 2 in (1.88 m)	180 lb (82 kg)	Fr	Brooklyn Park, MN
G	22	Cameron Hunter	6 ft 2 in (1.88 m)	185 lb (84 kg)	RS So	Olathe, KS
F	23	Deng Geu	6 ft 8 in (2.03 m)	215 lb (98 kg)	RS Jr	Sioux Falls, SD
G	24	Tyson Ward	6 ft 6 in (1.98 m)	190 lb (86 kg)	Jr	Tampa, FL
F	32	Odell IV Wilson	6 ft 6 in (1.98 m)	260 lb (118 kg)	Fr	Minneapolis, MN
G	33	Jordan Horn	6 ft 2 in (1.88 m)	200 lb (91 kg)	So	Saint Paul, MN
F	34	Rocky Kreuser	6 ft 9 in (2.06 m)	245 lb (111 kg)	So	White Bear Lake, MN
C	44	Jordan Meidinger	7 ft 0 in (2.13 m)	240 lb (109 kg)	RS Fr	Dickinson, ND

Head coach

- David Richman (North Dakota State)

Assistant coach(es)

- Jayden Olson (Dickinson State)
- Kyan Brown (Oral Roberts)
- Will Veasley (Butler)

Legend

- (C) Team captain
- (S) Suspended
- (I) Ineligible
- (W) Walk-on
- Injured
- Current redshirt

Roster
Last update: May 27, 2024

== Schedule and results ==
Date time, TV	Rank^{#}	Opponent^{#}	Result	Record	Site (attendance) city, state
Exhibition
November 1, 2018*; 7:00 p.m., MidcoSN/ESPN3		Concordia (MN)	W 81–49		Scheels Center (1,154); Fargo, ND
Regular season
November 6, 2018*; 8:30 p.m., FSAZ+		at New Mexico State; Summit/WAC Challenge	L 56–73	0–1	Pan American Center (4,358); Las Cruces, NM
November 11, 2018*; 1:00 p.m., MidcoSN/ESPN+		UC Santa Barbara	W 82–63	1–1	Scheels Center (1,962); Fargo, ND
November 16, 2018*; 1:00 p.m.		vs. Miami (OH); The Islands of the Bahamas Showcase quarterfinal	L 78–89	1–2	Kendal Isaacs National Gymnasium (325); Nassau, Bahamas
November 17, 2018*; 10:00 a.m.		vs. Incarnate Word; The Islands of the Bahamas Showcase	L 78–80 ^{OT}	1–3	Kendal Isaacs National Gymnasium (204); Nassau, Bahamas
November 18, 2018*; 10:00 a.m.		vs. Towson; The Islands of the Bahamas Showcase	W 76–51	2–3	Kendal Isaacs National Gymnasium (219); Nassau, Bahamas
November 24, 2018*; 3:00 p.m.		at East Tennessee State	L 61–79	2–4	Freedom Hall Civic Center (3,610); Johnson City, TN
November 26, 2018*; 8:00 p.m., RTNW		at No. 1 Gonzaga	L 60–102	2–5	McCarthey Athletic Center (6,000); Spokane, WA
December 1, 2018*; 5:30 p.m., MidcoSN/ESPN+		vs. Drake; U.S. Bank Stadium Classic	L 88–95	2–6	U.S. Bank Stadium (2,186); Minneapolis, MN
December 3, 2018*; 7:00 p.m.		at Iowa State	L 59–81	2–7	Hilton Coliseum (13,809); Ames, IA
December 8, 2018*; 7:00 p.m., MidcoSN/ESPN+		Eastern Washington; Big Sky/Summit Challenge	W 74–67	3–7	Scheels Center (2,373); Fargo, ND
December 15, 2018*; 7:30 p.m., MidcoSN/ESPN+		Missouri State	W 74–67	4–7	Scheels Center (1,942); Fargo, ND
December 17, 2018*; 8:00 p.m.		at Montana	L 53–60	4–8	Dahlberg Arena (3,553); Missoula, MT
December 19, 2018*; 7:00 p.m., MidcoSN/ESPN3		Northland	W 90–43	5–8	Scheels Center (715); Fargo, ND
December 29, 2018; 12:00 p.m., MidcoSN/ESPN+		South Dakota	W 71–65	6–8 (1–0)	Scheels Center (2,192); Fargo, ND
December 30, 2018; 4:00 p.m., MidcoSN/ESPN+		Purdue Fort Wayne	L 87–90 ^{OT}	6–9 (1–1)	Scheels Center (2,043); Fargo, ND
January 2, 2019; 7:00 p.m., MidcoSN2		at Omaha	L 77–90	6–10 (1–2)	Baxter Arena (1,775); Omaha, NE
January 6, 2019*; 2:00 p.m.		Dickinson State	W 85–53	7–10	Scheels Center (975); Fargo, ND
January 10, 2019; 7:00 p.m., MidcoSN2/ESPN3		Western Illinois	W 85–69	8–10 (2–2)	Scheels Center (2,461); Fargo, ND
January 16, 2019; 8:00 p.m., ALT2		at Denver	L 65–80	8–11 (2–3)	Magness Arena (829); Denver, CO
January 19, 2019; 2:00 p.m., MidcoSN/ESPN3		North Dakota	W 67–65	9–11 (3–3)	Scheels Center (4,232); Fargo, ND
January 24, 2019; 7:00 p.m., MidcoSN/ESPN+		at South Dakota State	L 69–87	9–12 (3–4)	Frost Arena (2,578); Brookings, SD
January 26, 2019; 7:00 p.m., ESPN3		at Oral Roberts	W 67–57	10–12 (4–4)	Mabee Center (2,717); Tulsa, OK
February 2, 2019; 7:00 p.m., ESPN3		at Western Illinois	W 78–76	11–12 (5–4)	Western Hall (521); Macomb, IL
February 6, 2019; 7:00 p.m., MidcoSN/ESPN+		at North Dakota	W 74–70	12–12 (6–4)	Betty Engelstad Sioux Center (2,016); Grand Forks, ND
February 9, 2019; 4:00 p.m., MidcoSN2/ESPN3		Denver	W 81–71	13–12 (7–4)	Scheels Center (2,094); Fargo, ND
February 14, 2019; 7:00 p.m., MidcoSN/ESPN3		Oral Roberts	W 85–73	14–12 (8–4)	Scheels Center (1,880); Fargo, ND
February 16, 2019; 4:00 p.m., MidcoSN/ESPN+		South Dakota State	L 77–78	14–13 (8–5)	Scheels Center (3,957); Fargo, ND
February 23, 2019; 4:00 p.m., MidcoSN2/ESPN3		Omaha	L 50–58	14–14 (8–6)	Scheels Center (2,177); Fargo, ND
February 28, 2019; 8:00 p.m., MidcoSN/ESPN+		at South Dakota	L 65–75	14–15 (8–7)	Sanford Coyote Sports Center (2,482); Vermillion, SD
March 2, 2019; 4:00 p.m.		at Purdue Fort Wayne	W 69–66	15–15 (9–7)	Gates Sports Center (1,005); Fort Wayne, IN
The Summit League tournament
March 10, 2019; 6:00 p.m., MidcoSN	(4)	vs. (5) Oral Roberts; Quarterfinal	W 86–73	16–15	Premier Center (5,989); Sioux Falls, SD
March 11, 2019; 6:00 p.m., ESPN+	(4)	vs. (8) Western Illinois; Semifinal	W 76–73	17–15	Denny Sanford Premier Center (4,508); Sioux Falls, SD
March 12, 2019; 6:00 p.m., ESPN2	(4)	vs. (2) Omaha; Championship	W 73–63	18–15	Denny Sanford Premier Center (4,076); Sioux Falls, SD
NCAA tournament
March 20, 2019*; 5:40 p.m., truTV	(16 E)	vs. (16 E) North Carolina Central; First Four	W 78–74	19–15	UD Arena (11,827); Dayton, OH
March 22, 2019*; 6:10 p.m., CBS	(16 E)	vs. (1 E) No. 1 Duke; First round	L 62–85	19–16	Colonial Life Arena (16,219); Columbia, SC
*Non-conference game. ^{#}Rankings from AP poll. (#) Tournament seedings in parentheses. E=East. All times are in Central.
