= 2018–19 Summit League men's basketball season =

- League: NCAA Division I
- Sport: Basketball
- Duration: November 2018 through March 2019
- Teams: 9

Regular Season
- Champion: South Dakota State
- Season MVP: Mike Daum, South Dakota State

Tournament

Summit League men's basketball seasons
- ← 2017–18 2019–20 →

2018–19 Summit League men's basketball standings
	Conf.				Overall
Team	W		L	PCT	W		L	PCT
South Dakota State	14	–	2	.875	24	–	9	.727
Omaha	13	–	3	.813	21	–	11	.656
Purdue Fort Wayne	9	–	7	.563	18	–	15	.545
North Dakota State †	9	–	7	.563	19	–	16	.543
Oral Roberts	7	–	9	.438	11	–	21	.344
South Dakota	7	–	9	.438	13	–	17	.433
North Dakota	6	–	10	.375	12	–	18	.400
Western Illinois	4	–	12	.250	10	–	21	.323
Denver	3	–	13	.188	8	–	22	.267
† 2019 Summit League tournament winner

The 2018–19 Summit League men's basketball season began with practices in October 2018, followed by the start of the 2018–19 NCAA Division I men's basketball season in November. Conference play begins in January 2019 and concludes in February 2019. The season marked the 36th season of Summit League basketball.

On December 7, 2018, Mike Daum became the Summit League's all-time leading scorer. In a 42-point outing against Southern, Daum passed former Oral Roberts forward Caleb Green’s conference record 2,504 points.

== Preseason ==
=== Preseason poll ===
Rank	Team
1	South Dakota State (34)
2	South Dakota (1)
3	Denver (1)
4	Purdue Fort Wayne
5	North Dakota State
6	Oral Roberts
7	North Dakota
8	Omaha
9	Western Illinois

() first place votes

=== Preseason All-Conference Teams ===
Award	Recipients
First Team	Mike Daum (South Dakota State); Trey Burch-Manning (South Dakota); Zach Jackson (Omaha); David Jenkins Jr. (South Dakota State); John Konchar (Purdue Fort Wayne); Joe Rosga (Denver)
Second Team	Brandon Gilbeck (Western Illinois); Tyler Hagedorn (South Dakota); Emmanuel Nzekwesi (Oral Roberts); Tyson Ward (North Dakota State); Kobe Webster (Western Illinois)

Summit League Preseason Player of the Year: Mike Daum (South Dakota State)
