= David Simon (basketball) =

American basketball player (born 1982)

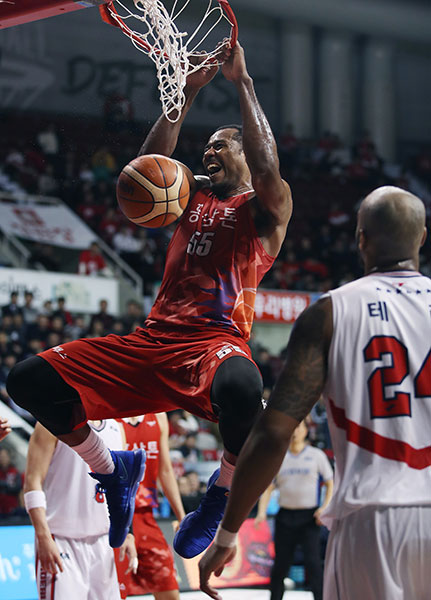
- Simon during a 2018 KBL game

Personal information
- Born: August 9, 1982 (age 44) Vernon Hills, Illinois, U.S.
- Listed height: 6 ft 9 in (2.06 m)
- Listed weight: 260 lb (118 kg)

Career information
- High school: Adlai E. Stevenson (Lincolnshire, Illinois)
- College: Fort Wayne (2001–2005)
- NBA draft: 2005: undrafted
- Playing career: 2005–2024
- Position: Center

Career history
- 2005–2006: Lukoil Academic
- 2006–2007: Standart
- 2007–2008: JDA Dijon
- 2008–2010: Strasbourg IG
- 2010–2011: Anyang KGC
- 2011–2012: Radnički Kragujevac
- 2012–2014: Astana
- 2014–2015: Wonju Dongbu Promy
- 2015–2016: Seoul SK Knights
- 2016: Tropang TNT
- 2016–2018: Anyang KGC
- 2018: Shaanxi Wolves
- 2018–2022: Kyoto Hannaryz
- 2022: Goyang Carrot Jumpers
- 2023: Earthfriends Tokyo Z
- 2023: Shinshu Brave Warriors
- 2024: Fukui Blowinds

Career highlights
- Adriatic League MVP (2012); Adriatic League Top Scorer (2012); KBL (2017); 3× KBL All-Star (2011, 2016, 2018); KBL All-Defensive First Team (2017)

David Joseph Simon (born August 9, 1982) is an American professional basketball player. He played his collegiate basketball for Indiana University–Purdue University Fort Wayne.

== College career ==
In his first year as a college player, he averaged 10.6 points per game and 5.8 rebounds. At the end of the year he injured his left knee and went for surgery, but fully recovered for the next season. Before the second season at Indiana University – Purdue University Fort Wayne, he was ranked as the nation's second-best college center, behind Emeka Okafor of Connecticut. He was named "Pre-Season Independent Player of the Year". Simon was also an All-American Candidate. He declared for the 2004 NBA draft without agent, but tore the ACL on his right knee during the Chicago Pre-Draft Camp and withdrew his name from the early entries into the draft and returned to school. He finished his last college season averaging 16.6 points and 6.9 rebounds. Simon finished as the all time leader in blocked shots and was inducted to the PFW Hall of Fame in 2016.

=== College statistics ===
Year	Team	GP	GS	MPG	FG%	3P%	FT%	RPG	APG	SPG	BPG	PPG
2002-03	IPFW	30	NA	23.1	.580	.000	.651	5.8	.7	.4	1.3	10.6
2003-04	IPFW	28	NA	31.4	.584	1.000	.648	9.8	1.6	.8	1.9	18.0
2004-05	IPFW	25	NA	32.1	.523	.077	.633	6.9	2.0	.8	1.9	16.6
Career		83	NA	28.6	.560	.200	.643	7.5	1.4	.7	1.7	14.9

== Professional career ==
Simon played for the Timberwolves at the NBA Summer League and at the New Jersey Nets mini camp. On 10 October 2005, Simon signed with Bulgarian club Lukoil Academic which participated in the ULEB Cup. In the mid of the season he said

I needed game like this one, to play well and show I can do well. After the end of ULEB Cup I would like to stay here and hopefully everything will be ok. For now I want to concentrate and play well in ULEB and Bulgarian championship as well.

In the Bulgarian league he averaged 11.4 points and 5.8 rebounds per game, while in the ULEB Cup he averaged 7.6 points and 7.8 rebounds for 25 minutes on the floor. In 2006 he signed for Russian club Standart Samarskiy Region and stayed for one season. Over 14 games in the Russian Super League, he averaged 11.1 points and 6.9 rebounds (7th in the league). However, he left the team midseason to go to France and Standart finished 13th and relegated into lower league.

He then played for French teams, both members of LNB Pro A League, Dijon and Strasbourg till 2010. For Dijon he played one game in Eurocup, where he scored 18 points, while for Strasbourg he played in EuroChallenge, where over 6 games he averaged 17.8 points and 8.3 rebounds. In 2010, he signed with the Anyang KGC of the Korean Basketball League where he would go on to make his first All-Star team.

In August 2011, Simon signed a one-year deal with Radnički Kragujevac. Due to the NBA lockout that year, many NBA players were in the ABA that season. With that, Simon was named Adriatic League MVP and was the league's top scorer, averaging 19.4 points and 6.5 rebounds per game.

On 11 June 2012, Simon signed a one-year contract with the Astana, along with Andreas Glyniadakis. In April 2013, he extended his contract for one more season.

In 2014 he returned to the Korean Basketball League with Wonju DB Promy, earning his second KBL All Star Bid and leading them to the Finals. The next season he signed with Seoul SK Knights of the KBL, making another All Star game averaging 20.5ppg and 9rpg. On February 19, 2016, Simon was signed by Tropang TNT as the team's new import, replacing the suspended Ivan Johnson where he averaged 24.5ppg and 15.5rpg.

In 2016 he signed with Anyang KGC back in the KBL. He led the team with 26.3ppg and 9.6rpg to a regular season championship as well as the 2016-2017 KBL Season Championship title. The next season he would earn another All Star appearance as well as the KBL Scoring title averaging 26.1ppg and 10.8rpg. In April 2018, Simon was released from Anyang shortly after the KBL implemented a rule on foreign players. The KBL allows each team to have two foreign-born players on their rosters with neither taller than 200 centimeters. Simon was two centimeters over the limit. The move was made to combat declining league attendance, however it was met with much criticism which landed him with an interview on ESPN's Outside the Lines. .

He went on to play 4 seasons, 2018-2022 in the Japanese B.League for Kyoto Hannaryz, being top 5 in scoring each of his 4 seasons. In July 2022 he signed with the Goyang Carrot Jumpers back in the KBL. In March 2023, he signed with Tokyo Z of the Japanese B2 League.

In October 2023, he signed with Shinshu Brave Warriors of the Japanese B.League.

== European career statistics ==
Legend
GP	Games played	GS	Games started	MPG	Minutes per game
FG%	Field-goal percentage	3P%	3-point field-goal percentage	FT%	Free-throw percentage
RPG	Rebounds per game	APG	Assists per game	SPG	Steals per game
BPG	Blocks per game	PPG	Points per game	PIR	Performance index rating
**Bold**	Career high

=== Adriatic league ===
Year	Team	GP	GS	MPG	FG%	3P%	FT%	RPG	APG	SPG	BPG	PPG	PIR
2011–12	Radnički	26	26	29.2	.637	.300	.575	6.5	1.2	1.0	1.4	19.4	22.3
Career		26	26	29.2	.637	.300	.575	6.5	1.2	1.0	1.4	19.4	22.3
