= List of NCAA Division I men's basketball career scoring leaders =

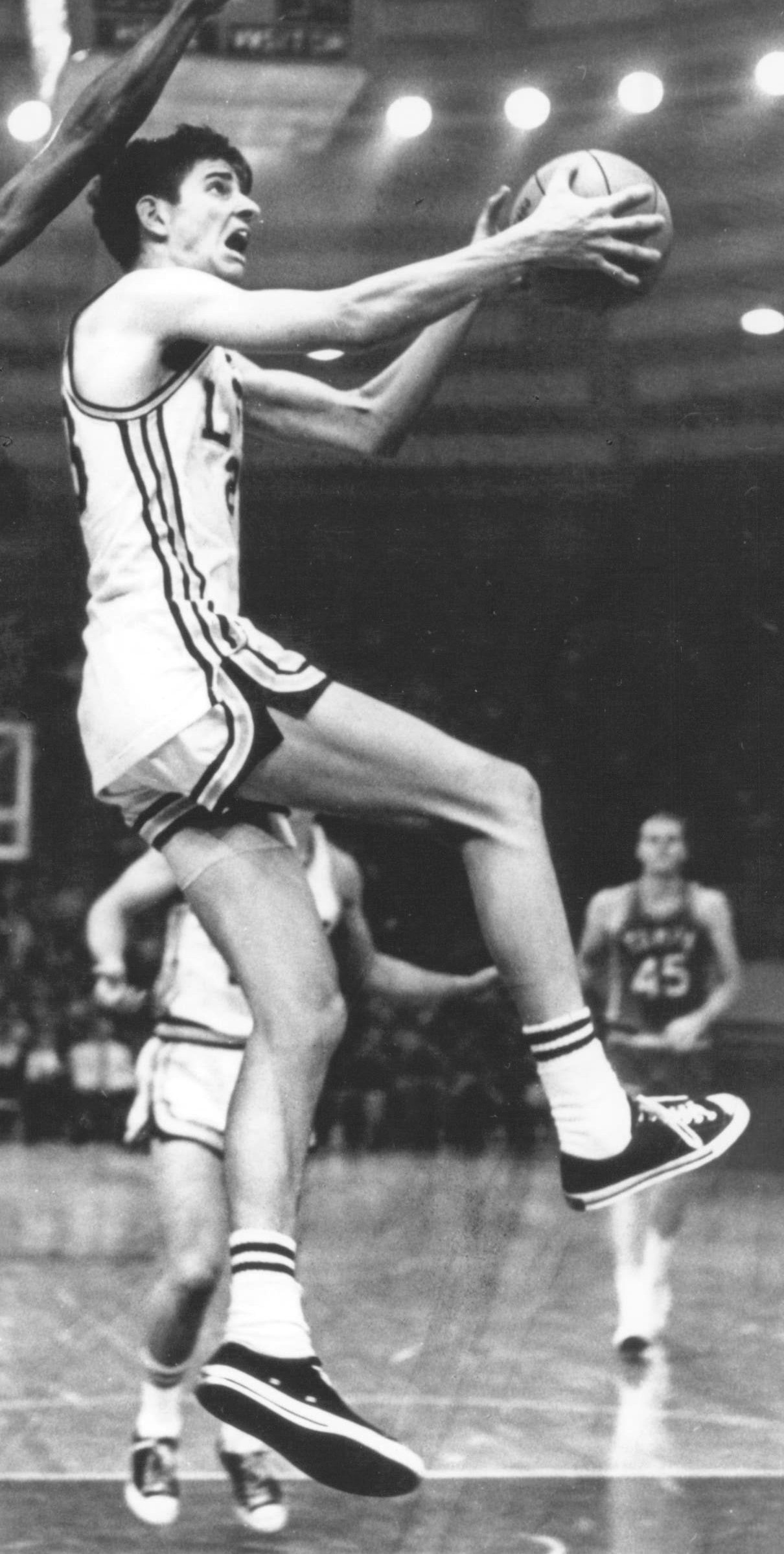
Pete Maravich, who averaged 44.2 points per game over three seasons for LSU, holds the NCAA Division I scoring record with 3,667 points

In basketball, points are the sum of the score accumulated through free throws and field goals. In National Collegiate Athletic Association (NCAA) Division I basketball, it is considered a notable achievement to reach the 1,000-points scored threshold. In even rarer instances, players have reached the 2,000- and 3,000-point plateaus (no player has ever scored 4,000 or more points at the Division I level). The top 25 highest scorers in NCAA Division I men's basketball history are listed below. The NCAA was not organized into its current divisional format until August 1973. From 1906 to 1955, there were no classifications to the NCAA nor its predecessor, the Intercollegiate Athletic Association of the United States (IAAUS). Then, from 1956 to spring 1973, colleges were classified as either "NCAA University Division (Major College)" or "NCAA College Division (Small College)".

Numerous players among the top 25 scorers in Division I history played in the era before the three-point line was officially adopted in 1986–87. All of the players with a dash through the three-point field goals column were affected by this rule. Hank Gathers of Loyola Marymount is the only three-point shot era player on this list who did not make a single three-point shot. In the 1986–87 season, the three-point arc was made mandatory in men's basketball, marked at 19 ft 9 in (6.02 m) from the center of the basket; at the same time, the three-point arc became an experimental rule in NCAA women's basketball, using the men's distance. In the following season, the men's three-point line became mandatory in women's basketball, and from that point through the 2007–08 season, the three-point lines remained at 19 ft 9 in (6.02 m). On May 3, 2007, the NCAA men's basketball rules committee passed a measure to extend the distance of the men's three-point line back to 20 ft 9 in (6.32 m); the women's line remained at the original distance until it was moved to match the men's distance effective in 2011–12. Still later, the NCAA moved the men's three-point line to 6.75 m (22 ft 2 in) for the main arc and 6.6 m (21 ft 8 in) in the corners, matching the distance used by the sport's international governing body of FIBA. This last move was implemented in two phases, with Division I adopting the new line in 2019–20 and Divisions II and III doing so in 2020–21. Women's basketball did not adopt the FIBA arc until 2021–22.

Additionally, several of the players on this list played during an era when college freshmen were ineligible to compete at the varsity level and competed on either freshman or junior varsity teams. As freshman and junior varsity statistics do not count toward official NCAA records, three players—Pete Maravich, Oscar Robertson and Elvin Hayes—only had three seasons to compile their totals. Larry Bird redshirted (sat out) his freshman year, and therefore, like Maravich, Robertson, and Hayes, his totals were also achieved in only three seasons. Maravich, a guard from LSU, not only owns the three highest single season averages in Division I history, but also the highest career total. Remarkably, he scored 3,667 points in a mere 83 games.

Four players on this top 25 list are enshrined in the Naismith Memorial Basketball Hall of Fame: Pete Maravich, Oscar Robertson, Elvin Hayes, and Larry Bird.

== Key ==
Pos.	G	F	C	Ref.
Position	Guard	Forward	Center	References

^	Player still active in NCAA Division I
*	Elected to the Naismith Memorial Basketball Hall of Fame as a player
‡	Player received at least one hardship waiver (also known as a "medical redshirt") from the NCAA
C	Player was active in the 2020–21 season, benefiting from the NCAA's blanket COVID-19 eligibility waiver
Team (X)	Denotes the number of times a player from that team appears on the list

== Top 25 career scoring leaders ==
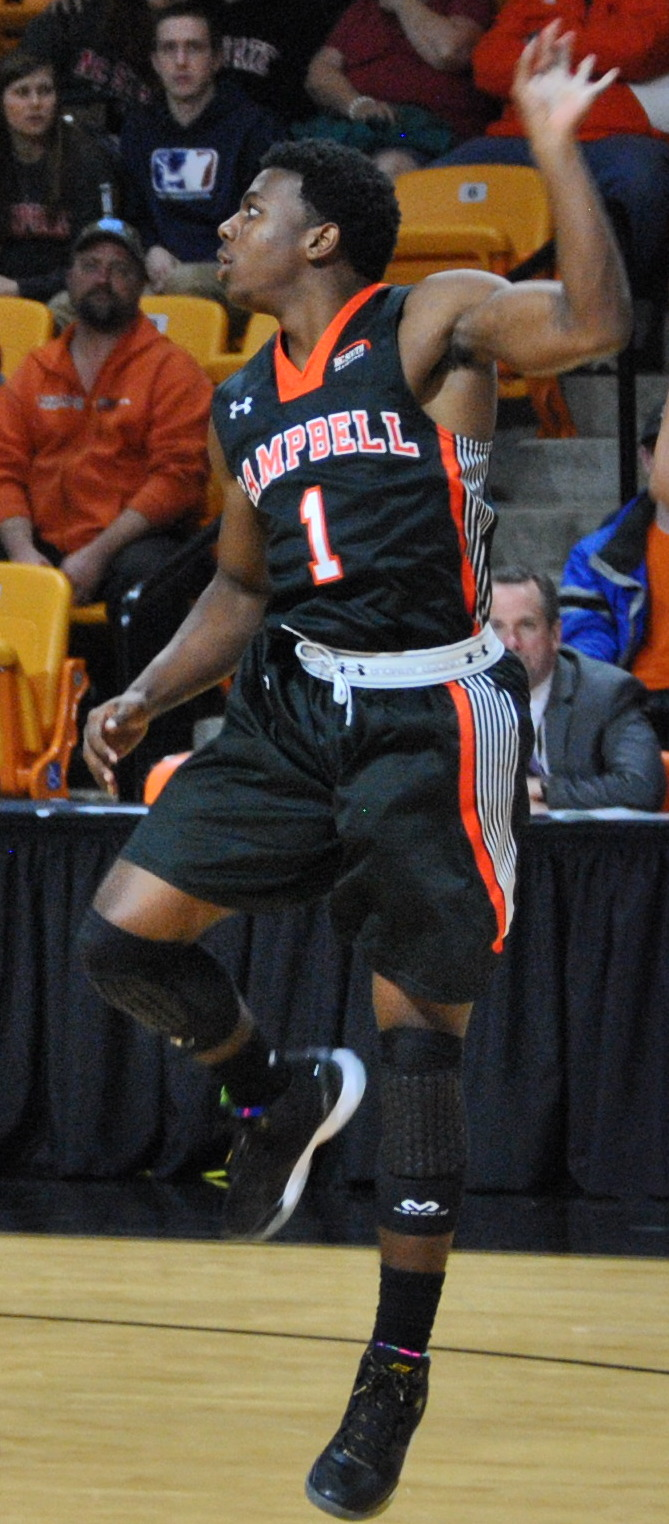
Chris Clemons, fourth all-time in points, finished his collegiate career in March 2019.

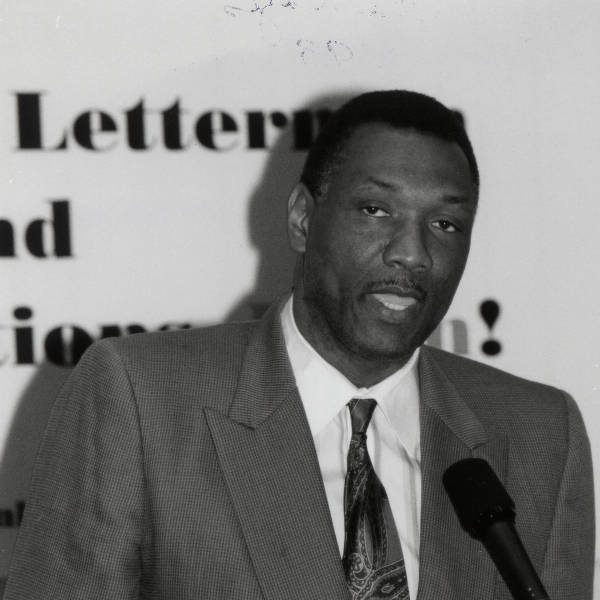
Elvin Hayes finished with 2,884 points.

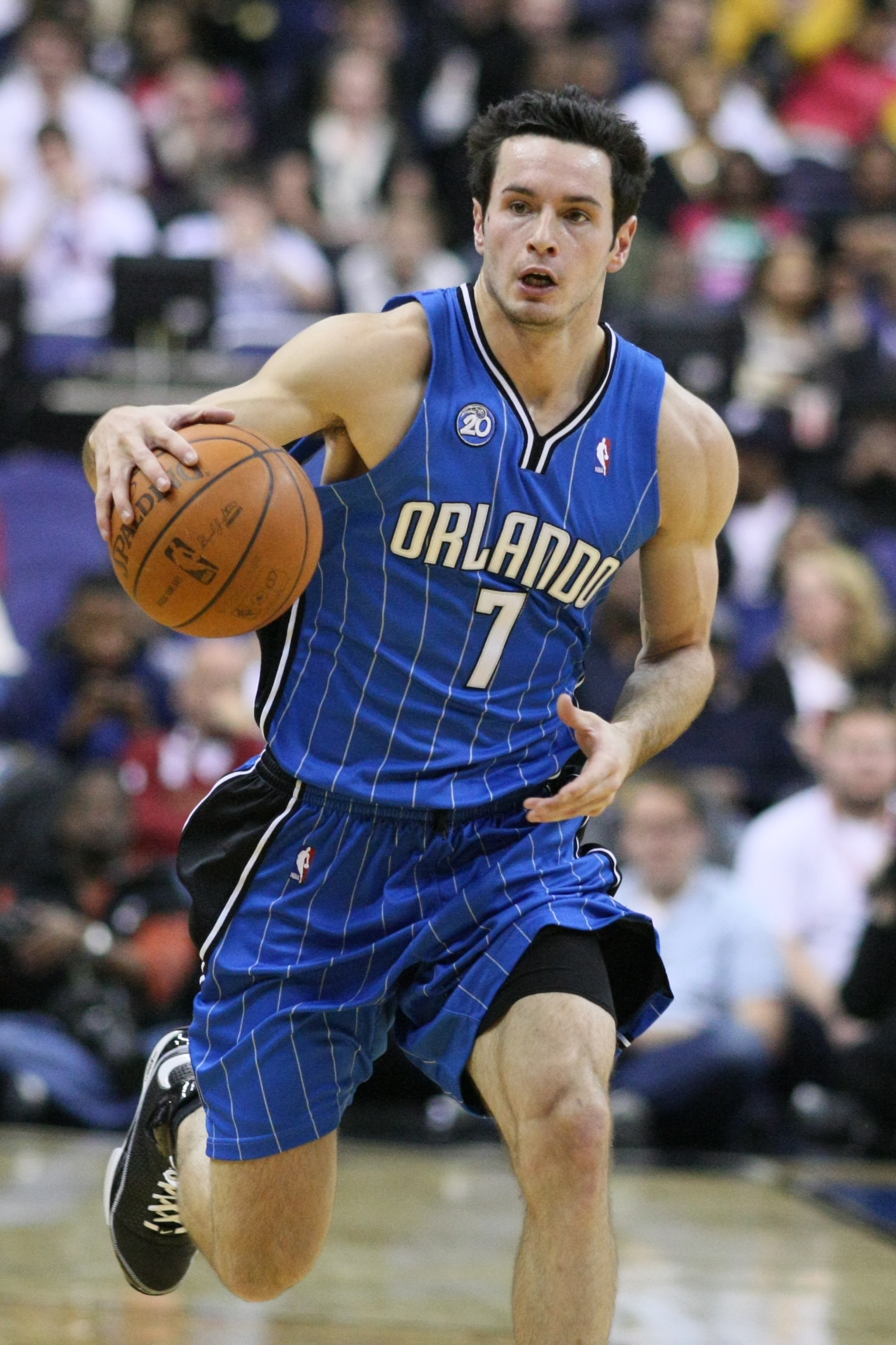
JJ Redick is also eighth all-time in three-point field goals made (457).

Player	Pos.	Team(s)	Career start	Career end	Games played	Field goals made	3-point field goals made	Free throws made	Points	PPG	Ref.
Pete Maravich*	G	LSU	1967	1970	83	1,387	—	893	3,667	44.2	
Antoine Davis^{C}	G	Detroit Mercy	2018	2023	144	1,219	588	638	3,664	25.4	
Freeman Williams	F/G	Portland State	1974	1978	106	1,369	—	511	3,249	30.7	
Chris Clemons	G	Campbell	2015	2019	130	1,024	444	733	3,225	24.8	
Lionel Simmons	F	La Salle	1986	1990	131	1,244	56	673	3,217	24.6	
Alphonso Ford	G	Mississippi Valley State	1989	1993	109	1,121	333	590	3,165	29.0	
Doug McDermott	F	Creighton	2010	2014	145	1,141	274	594	3,150	21.7	
Max Abmas^{C}	G	Oral Roberts / Texas	2019	2024	157	1,035	512	549	3,131	19.9	
Mike Daum	F	South Dakota State	2015	2019	137	1,005	271	786	3,067	22.4	
Harry Kelly	F	Texas Southern	1979	1983	110	1,234	—	598	3,066	27.9	
Keydren Clark	G	Saint Peter's	2002	2006	118	967	435	689	3,058	25.9	
Hersey Hawkins	G	Bradley	1984	1988	125	1,100	118	690	3,008	25.5	
Oscar Robertson*	G	Cincinnati	1957	1960	88	1,052	—	869	2,973	33.8	
Danny Manning	F	Kansas	1984	1988	147	1,216	10	509	2,951	20.1	
Alfredrick Hughes	G	Loyola Chicago	1981	1985	120	1,226	—	462	2,914	24.3	
Elvin Hayes*	C/F	Houston	1965	1968	93	1,215	—	454	2,884	31.0	
Tyler Hansbrough	F	North Carolina	2005	2009	142	939	12	982	2,872	20.2	
Larry Bird*	F	Indiana State	1976	1979	94	1,154	—	542	2,850	30.3	
Mark Sears^{C}	G	Ohio / Alabama	2020	2025	170	870	326	773	2,839	16.7	
Otis Birdsong	G	Houston (2)	1973	1977	116	1,176	—	480	2,832	24.4	
Kevin Bradshaw	G	Bethune–Cookman / U.S. International	1987	1991	111	1,027	132	618	2,804	25.3	
Allan Houston	G/F	Tennessee	1989	1993	128	902	346	651	2,801	21.9	
Hunter Dickinson^{C}	C	Michigan / Kansas (2)	2020	2025	161	1,132	84	452	2,800	17.4	
JJ Redick	G	Duke	2002	2006	139	825	457	662	2,769	19.9	
Caleb Love^{C}	G	North Carolina (2) / Arizona	2020	2025	174	922	390	528	2,762	15.9	

== All-time conference scoring leaders ==
The following list contains current and defunct Division I conferences' all-time scoring leaders. The "conference founded" column indicates when each conference first began intercollegiate athletic competition, not necessarily when they began basketball. For example, the Great West Conference was established as a football-only conference in 2004 but became an all-sports conference in 2008 (with basketball actually beginning in 2009–10). Also note that some of the schools on this list are no longer in the conference in which they are identified. Utah, for instance, is currently a member of the Big 12 Conference, but when Keith Van Horn set the scoring record it was still a member of the Western Athletic Conference. Similarly, BYU is also a current Big 12 member, but the career of its scoring leader Jimmer Fredette coincided with the program's last four seasons in the Mountain West Conference.

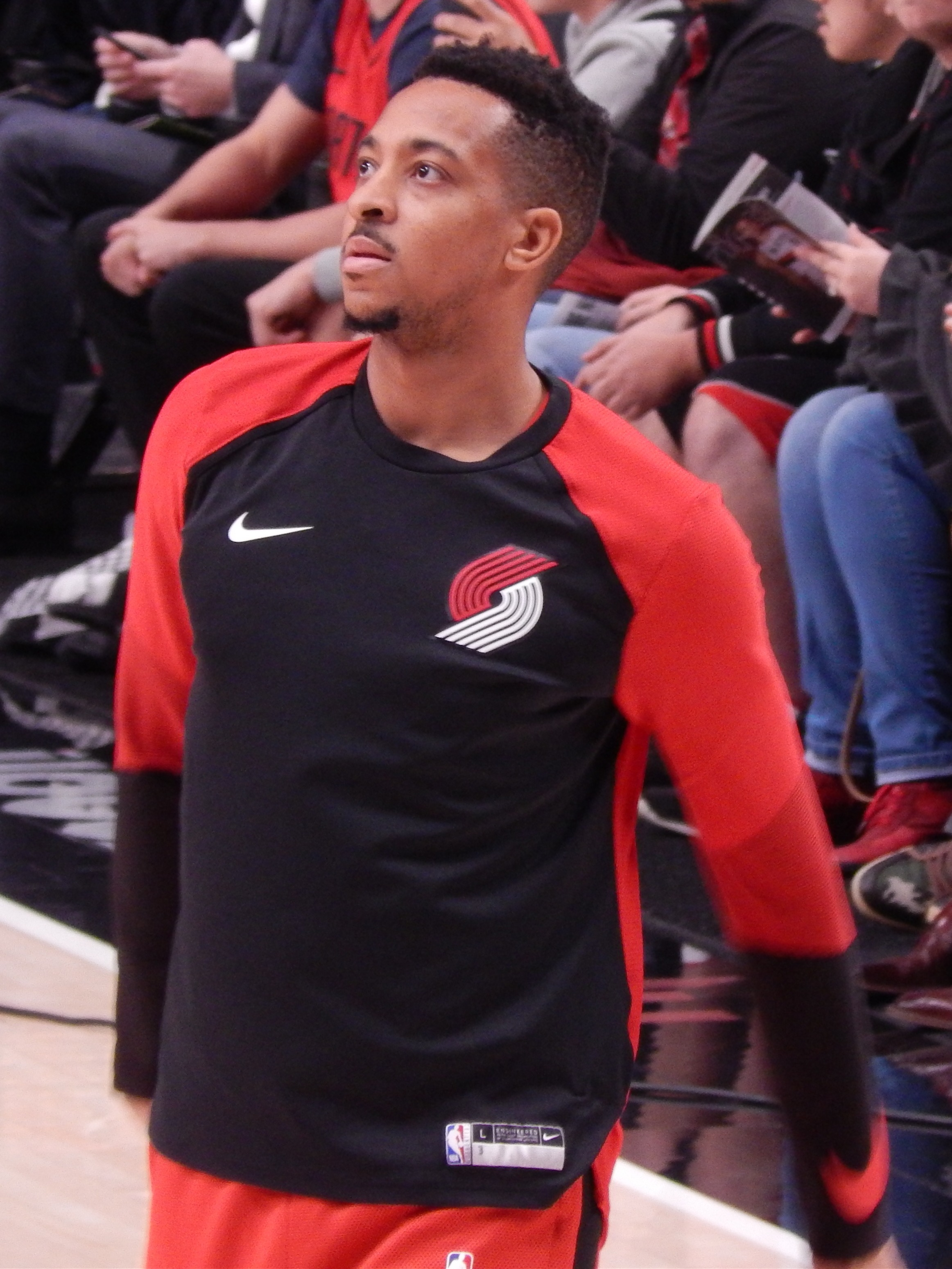
No player scored more Patriot League points than CJ McCollum (2,361).

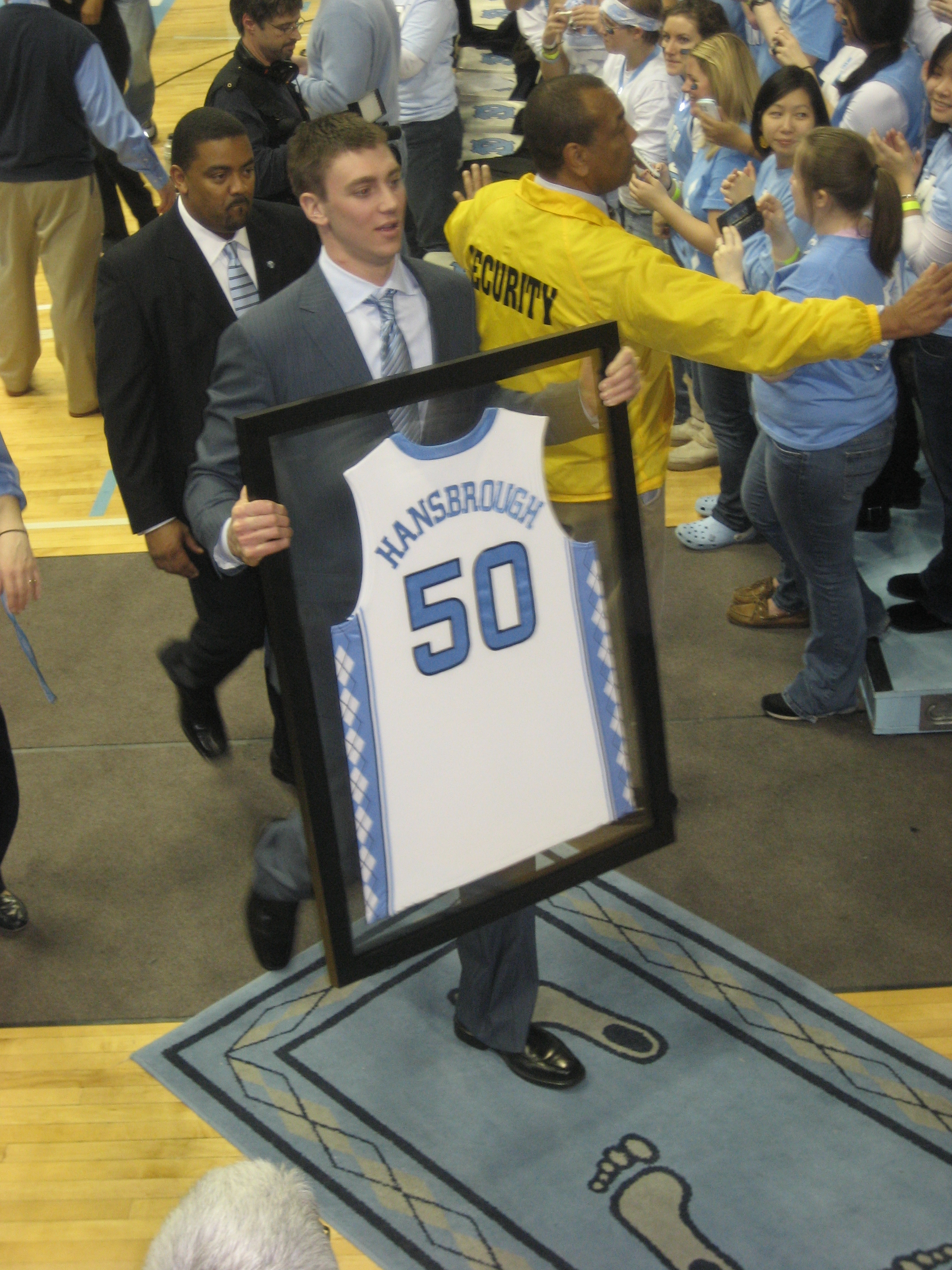
Tyler Hansbrough amassed an ACC-record 2,872 points at North Carolina.

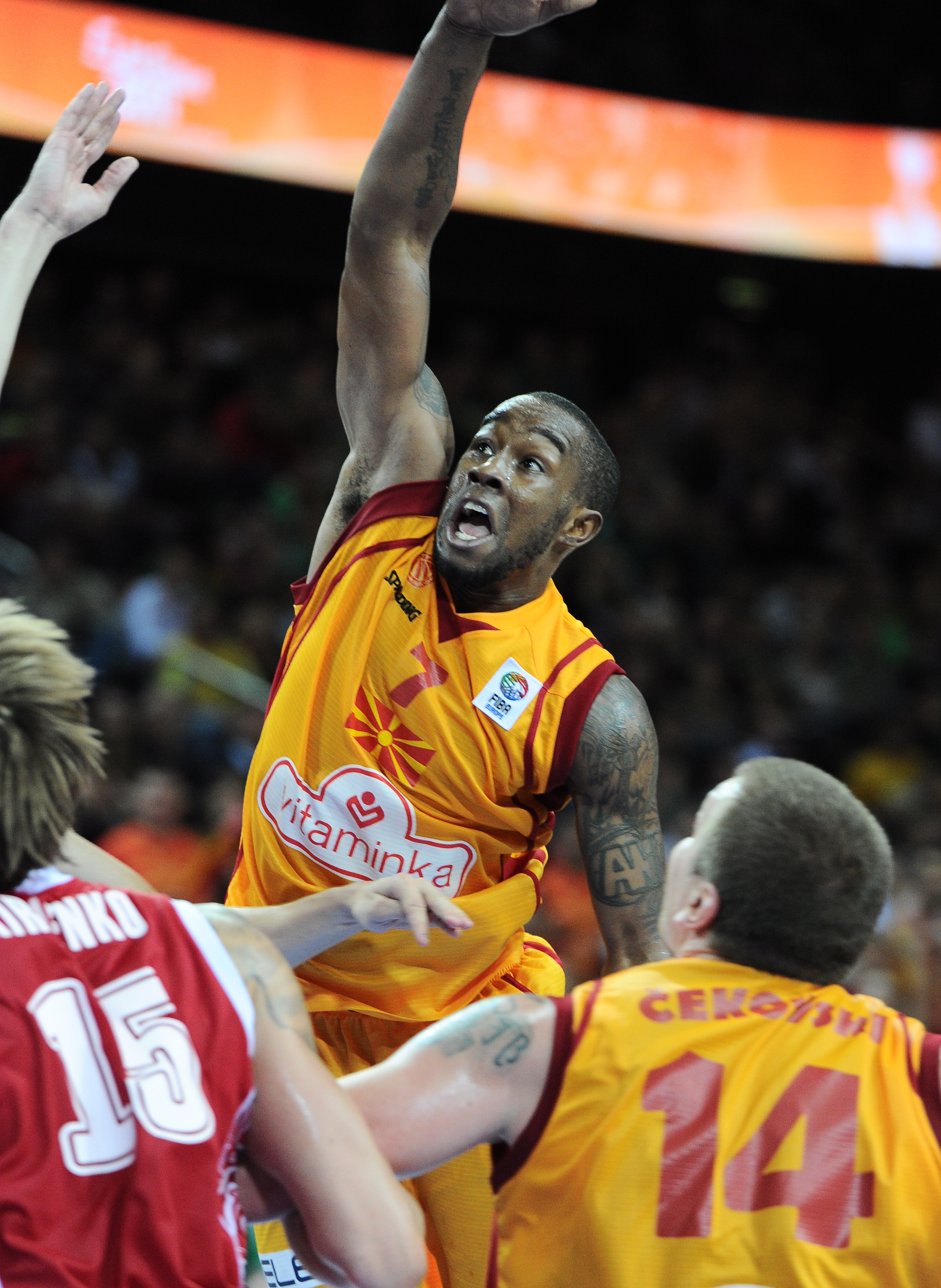
Bo McCalebb netted a Sun Belt record 2,679 points at New Orleans.

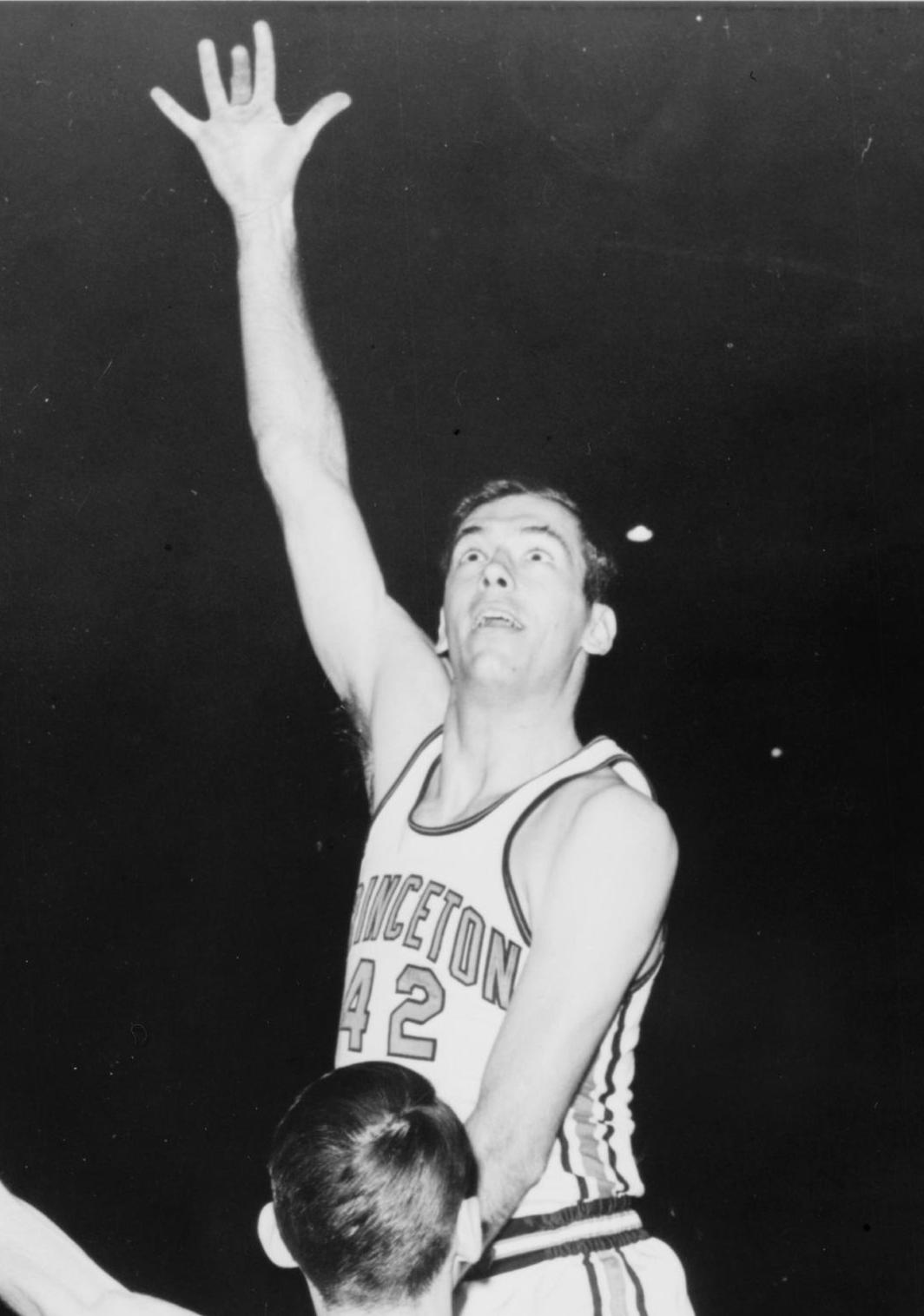
Bill Bradley, the Ivy League's all-time leading scorer, is also in the Naismith Memorial Basketball Hall of Fame.

Conference	Conference founded	Conference disbanded	Player	School	Career start	Career end	Points	Ref.
ACC	1953	—	Tyler Hansbrough	North Carolina	2005	2009	2,872	
America East	1979	—	Reggie Lewis	Northeastern	1983	1987	2,709	
American	2013 (Note: The original Big East Conference, founded in 1979 with basketball competition starting at that time, split along football lines in July 2013. The seven schools that did not sponsor Division I FBS football reorganized as a new Big East Conference, while the FBS football schools that had not left for other conferences, plus several new members, began operating as the American Athletic Conference. The American, which dropped the word "Athletic" from its name in 2025, now considers its basketball history to have begun with the 2013 split, while the current Big East maintains the basketball history of the original Big East.)	—	Kendric Davis^{C}	SMU / Memphis	2019 (Note: Davis started his college career in 2018 at TCU, then as now a member of the Big 12 Conference. He transferred to American member SMU after one season, receiving a waiver of NCAA rules that at the time required a transferring player to sit out a season. After three seasons as SMU, he took advantage of the NCAA's COVID eligibility waiver for 2020–21 and later changes to NCAA transfer rules to transfer within the conference to Memphis for his final college season in 2022–23.)	2023	2,059 (Note: Total includes only games played for American Conference members SMU and Memphis.)	
American South	1987	1991	Kevin Brooks	Southwestern Louisiana	1987	1991	2,294	
American West	1993 (Note: The American West Conference began as a football-only conference in 1993–94. Basketball was played for just two seasons, between 1994 and 1996.)	1996	Reggie Ingram	Southern Utah	1994	1996	644	
ASUN	1978	—	Darius McGhee^{C}	Liberty	2018	2023	2,685	
Atlantic 10	1976	—	Mark Macon	Temple	1987	1991	2,609	
Big 12	1996	—	Buddy Hield	Oklahoma	2012	2016	2,291	
Big East	1979	—	Markus Howard (Note: The Big East Conference also recognizes Howard as its all-time conference scoring leader, using the criterion of points scored in regular-season conference games only. He scored 1,587 points in games that counted toward the record.)	Marquette	2016	2020	2,761	
Big Eight	1907	1996	Danny Manning	Kansas	1984	1988	2,951	
Big Sky	1963	—	Tyler Hall	Montana State	2015	2019	2,518	
Big South	1983	—	Chris Clemons	Campbell	2015	2019	3,225	
Big Ten	1896	—	Calbert Cheaney	Indiana	1989	1993	2,613	
Big West	1969	—	Lucious Harris	Long Beach State	1989	1993	2,312	
CAA	1982	—	David Robinson*	Navy	1983	1987	2,669	
Conference USA	1995	—	Jon Elmore	Marshall	2015	2019	2,636	
East Coast	1958	1994	Daren Queenan	Lehigh	1984	1988	2,703	
Great Midwest	1990	1995	Erwin Claggett	Saint Louis	1991	1995	1,910	
Great West	2004	2013	Chris Flores	NJIT	2009	2013	1,726	
Horizon	1979	—	Antoine Davis^{C}	Detroit Mercy	2018	2023	3,664	
Ivy	1901 (Note: Although the Ivy League was not formally founded until 1954 and did not play its first basketball season until 1955–56, it considers its men's basketball league to be a continuation of the Eastern Intercollegiate Basketball League, founded in 1901.)	—	Bill Bradley*	Princeton	1962	1965	2,503	
MAAC	1980	—	Lionel Simmons	La Salle	1986	1990	3,217	
Metro	1975	1995	Bimbo Coles	Virginia Tech	1986	1990	2,484	
MAC	1946	—	Bonzi Wells	Ball State	1994	1998	2,485	
MEAC	1970	—	Charles Williams	Howard	2016	2020	2,404	
Missouri Valley	1907	—	Hersey Hawkins	Bradley	1984	1988	3,008	
Mountain West	1999	—	Jimmer Fredette	BYU	2007	2011	2,599	
NEC	1981	—	Terrance Bailey	Wagner	1983	1987	2,591	
OVC	1948	—	Henry Domercant	Eastern Illinois	1999	2003	2,602	
Pac-12	1959	—	Don MacLean	UCLA	1988	1992	2,608	
Pacific Coast (Note: Although the Pac-12 Conference claims the history of the Pacific Coast Conference, the PCC operated under a completely separate charter.)	1915	1959	Bob Houbregs*	Washington	1950	1953	1,774	
Patriot	1986	—	CJ McCollum	Lehigh	2009	2013	2,361	
SEC	1933	—	Pete Maravich*	LSU	1967	1970	3,667	
Southern	1921	—	Stephen Curry	Davidson	2006	2009	2,635	
Southland	1963	—	Joe Dumars* (Note: The Southland Conference recognizes Dwight "Bo" Lamar, who played at Southwestern Louisiana (now Louisiana) between 1968 and 1972, as their all-time conference scoring leader, using the criterion of points scored against conference opponents only. He scored 1,054 points in conference games. Additionally, Southwestern Louisiana did not join the Southland Conference until 1971, so all of Lamar's points prior to then do not count toward Southland Conference scoring. Joe Dumars, who is technically second on the list with 819 points, actually scored more career points than Lamar since McNeese was a member of the Southland Conference for the duration of Dumars' career. The above conference scoring leaders list uses overall career totals, not conference-career totals, as its criterion.)	McNeese	1981	1985	2,607	
Summit	1982	—	Mike Daum	South Dakota State	2015	2019	3,067	
Sun Belt	1976	—	Bo McCalebb	New Orleans	2003	2008	2,679	
SWC	1914	1996	Terrence Rencher	Texas	1991	1995	2,306	
SWAC	1920	—	Alphonso Ford	Mississippi Valley State	1989	1993	3,165	
West Coast	1952	—	Hank Gathers	Loyola Marymount	1987	1990	2,490 (Note: Hank Gathers' scoring total in this table includes only games played for WCC member Loyola Marymount; he played his freshman season of 1985–86 at USC in what was then known as the Pacific-10 Conference. He transferred from USC after that season; after sitting out the 1986–87 season due to NCAA transfer rules, he played at Loyola Marymount until his death during his senior season in 1990.)	
WAC (Note: The WAC will rename itself as the United Athletic Conference in July 2026.)	1962	—	Keith Van Horn	Utah	1993	1997	2,542	

== All-time schools' scoring leaders ==
These schools are full, current members of NCAA Division I, meaning they have finished the process of joining Division I or its historical equivalent. Some of the records below were set while the school was still in a lower division and are not intended to be solely Division I era scoring records; if no season-specific link exists, it is because the record was set while the school was a member of a lower division. Through 2024–25, the oldest school record is held by Jim Lacy at Loyola of Maryland, whose 2,199 points were last scored in 1949. The newest record holder, meanwhile, is Bruce Thornton of Ohio State, who set his record on March 7, 2026 in a game against Indiana. Lipscomb's John Pierce holds college basketball's all-time, all-divisions scoring mark of 4,230 points. He played from 1990 to 1994 while the Bisons were still a member of the NAIA.

All schools are listed with their current athletic brand names, which do not necessarily match those used when a school's scoring leader was active.

School	Player	Pos.	Career start	Career end	Points	Ref.
Abilene Christian	Corey Stone	SG	1991	1995	1,848	
Air Force	Raymond Dudley	SG	1986	1990	2,178	
Akron	Joe Jakubick	SG	1980	1984	2,583	
Alabama	Reggie King	SF/PF	1975	1979	2,168	
Alabama A&M						
Alabama State	Willie Scott	SF	1965	1969	3,155	
Albany	Jamar Wilson	PG	2002	2007	2,164	
Alcorn State	Richard Smith	PG	1952	1956	2,527	
American	Sa'eed Nelson	PG	2016	2020	2,116	
Appalachian State	Donald Sims	PG	2007	2011	2,185	
Arizona	Sean Elliott	SF	1985	1989	2,555	
Arizona State	Eddie House	PG/SG	1996	2000	2,044	
Arkansas	Todd Day	SG	1988	1992	2,395	
Arkansas State	Jerry Rook	SF	1961	1965	2,153	
Arkansas–Pine Bluff	James Mack Allen	SG	1960	1964	2,837	
Army	Kevin Houston	SG	1983	1987	2,325	
Auburn	Chuck Person	SF	1982	1986	2,311	
Austin Peay	Terry Taylor (Note: This player was active in the 2020–21 season but chose not to take advantage of the NCAA's COVID-19 eligibility waiver.)	SF	2017	2021	2,507	
Ball State	Bonzi Wells	SG/SF	1994	1998	2,485	
Baylor	LaceDarius Dunn	SG	2007	2011	2,285	
Bellarmine	Steve Mercer	C	1993	1997	1,969	
Belmont	Joe Behling	SF	1986	1990	2,823	
Bethune–Cookman	John Chaney (Note: Chaney is a Hall of Fame member as a coach, not as a player.)	PG	1951	1955	3,067+ (Note: Bethune–Cookman's career points record holders list puts Chaney at the top with "3,067+" because recordkeeping at the school during the 1950s was not as precise.)	
Binghamton	Chris Jackey	SG	1986	1990	1,721	
Boise State	Tanoka Beard	PF/C	1989	1993	1,944	
Boston College	Troy Bell	PG	1999	2003	2,632	
Boston University	Tunji Awojobi	PF	1993	1997	2,308	
Bowling Green	Justin Turner^{C}	PG/SG	2016	2021	2,077	
Bradley	Hersey Hawkins	SG	1984	1988	3,008	
Brown	Earl Hunt	SG	1999	2003	2,041	
Bryant	Tom Smile	SF	1963	1967	2,390	
Bucknell	Mike Muscala	C	2009	2013	2,036	
Buffalo	Javon McCrea	PF/C	2010	2014	2,004	
Butler	Chad Tucker	C	1983	1988	2,321	
BYU	Tyler Haws	SG	2009	2015 (Note: After playing as a freshman in 2009–10, Haws spent two years on an LDS Church mission and did not play his sophomore season until 2012–13.)	2,720	
Cal Poly	Chris Bjorklund	C	1997	2001	2,006	
Cal State Bakersfield	Stephon Carter	SG	2009	2013	1,628	
Cal State Fullerton	Bobby Brown	PG	2003	2007	1,961	
Cal State Northridge	Stephan Hicks	SG/SF	2010	2015	1,959	
California	Jerome Randle	PG	2006	2010	1,835	
California Baptist	Michael Smith	SG	2013	2017	2,031	
Campbell	Chris Clemons	PG	2015	2019	3,225	
Canisius	Ray Hall	SG	1981	1985	2,226	
Central Arkansas	Jordan Howard	PG	2014	2018	2,524	
Central Connecticut	Ken Horton	PF	2007	2012	1,966	
Central Michigan	Mel McLaughlin	PG	1979	1983	2,071	
Charleston	Andrew Goudelock	SG	2007	2011	2,571	
Charleston Southern	Ben Hinson	PG/SG	1983	1987	2,295	
Charlotte	Henry Williams	SG	1988	1992	2,383	
Chattanooga	Wayne Golden	SG	1973	1977	2,384	
Chicago State	David Holston	PG	2005	2009	2,331	
Cincinnati	Oscar Robertson* (Note: Robertson and West were also members of a team that was inducted into the Hall of Fame as a unit.)	PG	1957	1960	2,973	
The Citadel	Cameron Wells	PG	2007	2011	2,049	
Clemson	Elden Campbell	PF/C	1986	1990	1,880	
Cleveland State	Ken McFadden	PG	1985	1989	2,256	
Coastal Carolina	Tony Dunkin	SF	1989	1993	2,151	
Colgate	Tucker Neale	SG	1992	1995	2,075	
Colorado	Cory Higgins	SG/SF	2007	2011	2,001	
Colorado	Richard Roby	SG	2004	2008	2,001	
Colorado State	Pat Durham	SF	1985	1989	1,980	
Columbia	Buck Jenkins	PG	1989	1993	1,767	
Coppin State	Tywain McKee	PG/SG	2005	2009	2,158	
Cornell	Matt Morgan	PG	2015	2019	2,333	
Creighton	Doug McDermott	SF	2010	2014	3,150	
Dartmouth	Jim Barton	SF	1985	1989	2,158	
Davidson	Stephen Curry	PG	2006	2009	2,635	
Dayton	Roosevelt Chapman	SF	1980	1984	2,233	
Delaware	Devon Saddler	PG	2010	2014	2,222	
Delaware State	Tom Davis	PF	1987	1991	2,275	
Denver	Harry Hollines	SG	1965	1968	1,879	
DePaul	Mark Aguirre	SF	1978	1981	2,182	
Detroit Mercy	Antoine Davis^{C}	PG/SG	2018	2023	3,664	
Drake	Reed Timmer	SG	2014	2018	2,000	
Drexel	Michael Anderson	PG	1984	1988	2,208	
Duke	JJ Redick	SG	2002	2006	2,769	
Duquesne	Dick Ricketts	PF/C	1951	1955	1,963	
East Carolina	Bobby Hodges	C	1951	1954	2,018	
East Tennessee State	Tim Smith	PG	2002	2006	2,300	
East Texas A&M	Nate Granger	C	1973	1977	2,384	
Eastern Illinois	Henry Domercant	SG	1999	2003	2,602	
Eastern Kentucky	Nick Mayo	PF	2015	2019	2,316	
Eastern Michigan	Kennedy McIntosh	PF	1967	1971	2,219	
Eastern Washington	Bogdan Bliznyuk	SG/SF	2014	2018	2,169	
Elon	Jesse Branson	SF	1961	1965	2,241	
Evansville	D.J. Balentine	PG	2012	2016	2,464	
Fairfield	Tyler Nelson	PG	2014	2018	2,172	
Fairleigh Dickinson	Desi Wilson	C	1988	1991	1,902	
FIU	Dwight Stewart	PF	1988	1993	2,101	
Florida	Vernon Maxwell	PF	1984	1988	2,450	
Florida A&M	David Wright	SG	1966	1970	2,029	
Florida Atlantic	Greg Gantt	SG	2009	2013	1,972	
Florida Gulf Coast	Bernard Thompson	SG	2011	2015	1,835	
Florida State	Bob Sura	PG/SG	1991	1995	2,130	
Fordham	Ed Conlin	SG/SF	1951	1955	1,886	
Fresno State	Marvelle Harris	SG	2012	2016	2,031	
Furman	Frank Selvy	SG/SF	1951	1954	2,538	
Gardner–Webb	George Adams	SF	1969	1972	2,404	
George Mason	Carlos Yates	SF	1981	1985	2,420	
George Washington	Chris Monroe	PG/SG	1999	2003	2,248	
Georgetown	Sleepy Floyd	PG	1978	1982	2,304	
Georgia	Litterial Green	PG	1988	1992	2,111	
Georgia Southern	Chester Webb	C	1952	1956	2,542	
Georgia State	R. J. Hunter	SG	2012	2015	1,819	
Georgia Tech	Rich Yunkus	PF/C	1968	1971	2,232	
Gonzaga	Drew Timme	PF/C	2019	2023	2,307	
Grambling State	Bob Hopkins	PF/C	1952	1956	3,759	
Grand Canyon	Bayard Forrest	C	1972	1976	2,195	
Green Bay	Tony Bennett	PG	1988	1992	2,285	
Hampton	Jermaine Marrow	PG	2016	2020	2,680	
Harvard	Joe Carrabino	SF	1980	1985	1,880	
Hawaiʻi	Chris Gaines	PG	1986	1990	1,734	
High Point	Gene Littles	PG	1965	1969	2,398	
Hofstra	Charles Jenkins	PG/SG	2007	2011	2,513	
Holy Cross	Ron Perry	SG	1976	1980	2,524	
Houston	Elvin Hayes*	PF/C	1965	1968	2,884	
Houston Christian	Eddie Brown	SG	1968	1972	1,939	
Howard	Charles Williams	SG	2016	2020	2,404	
Idaho	Orlando Lightfoot	SG	1991	1994	2,102	
Idaho State	Les Roh	PG	1952	1956	1,964	
Illinois	Deon Thomas	PF	1990	1994	2,129	
Illinois State	Doug Collins	SG	1970	1973	2,240	
Incarnate Word	Kenneth Watson	SF	1991	1995	2,243	
Indiana	Calbert Cheaney	SG/SF	1989	1993	2,613	
Indiana State	Larry Bird* (Note: Bird, Mullin, and Robinson were also members of a team that was inducted into the Hall of Fame as a unit.)	SF/PF	1976	1979	2,850	
Iona	Steve Burtt	PG	1980	1984	2,534	
Iowa	Luka Garza	C	2017	2021	2,306	
Iowa State	Jeff Grayer	SG/SF	1984	1988	2,502	
IU Indy	Carlos Knox	SG	1994	1998	2,556	
Jackson State	Purvis Short	SF	1974	1978	2,434	
Jacksonville	Ralph Tiner	SF	1961	1965	2,184	
Jacksonville State	Robert Lee Sanders	PG	1986	1990	1,983	
James Madison	Steve Stielper	PF	1976	1980	2,126	
Kansas	Danny Manning	PF	1984	1988	2,951	
Kansas City	Michael Watson	PG/SG	2000	2004	2,488	
Kansas State	Jacob Pullen	PG	2007	2011	2,132	
Kennesaw State	Markeith Cummings	SG	2009	2013	2,048	
Kent State	Trevor Huffman	PG/SG	1998	2002	1,820	
Kentucky	Dan Issel*	PF/C	1967	1970	2,138	
La Salle	Lionel Simmons	SF	1986	1990	3,217	
Lafayette	Tracy Tripucka	SF	1969	1972	1,973	
Lamar	Mike Olliver	SG	1977	1981	2,518	
Lehigh	Daren Queenan	SG/SF	1984	1988	2,703	
Liberty	Darius McGhee^{C}	PG	2018	2023	2,685	
Lindenwood						
Lipscomb	John Pierce	C	1990	1994	4,230	
Little Rock	James Scott	PG/SG	1987	1991	1,731	
LIU	Raiquan Clark (Note: Clark began his college career at LIU Brooklyn. After the 2018–19 season, Long Island University merged the athletic programs of its two main campuses, Brooklyn and Post. The merged LIU program inherited the history and records of the Brooklyn program in all sports that the Brooklyn campus had sponsored at the time of the merger, including men's basketball.)	SG/SF	2015	2020	2,030	
Long Beach State	Lucious Harris	SG	1989	1993	2,312	
Longwood	Antwan Carter	C	2008	2012	1,886	
Louisiana	Bo Lamar	PG	1969	1973	3,493	
Louisiana–Monroe	Calvin Natt	SF	1975	1979	2,581	
Louisiana Tech	Mike Green	PF/C	1969	1973	2,340	
Louisville	Darrell Griffith	SG	1976	1980	2,333	
Loyola Chicago	Alfredrick Hughes	SG/SF	1981	1985	2,914	
Loyola (Maryland)	Jim Lacy	SF	1943	1949 (Note: Lacy played in 1943–44, fought in World War II, then finished his career from 1946 to 1949.)	2,199	
Loyola Marymount	Hank Gathers	PF	1987	1990	2,490	
LSU	Pete Maravich*	SG	1967	1970	3,667	
Maine	Rufus Harris	SF	1976	1980	2,206	
Manhattan	Luis Flores	PG/SG	2001	2004	2,046	
Marist	Chavaughn Lewis	SG/SF	2011	2015	2,119	
Marquette	Markus Howard	PG	2016	2020	2,761	
Marshall	Taevion Kinsey^{C}	PG/SG	2018	2023	2,641	
Maryland	Juan Dixon	PG/SG	1998	2002	2,269	
Maryland Eastern Shore	Jake Ford	PG	1966	1970	2,218	
McNeese	Joe Dumars*	PG/SG	1981	1985	2,607	
Memphis	Keith Lee	PF/C	1981	1985	2,408	
Mercer	James Florence	PG	2006	2010	2,286	
Merrimack	Juvaris Hayes	PG	2016	2020	1,951	
Miami (Florida)	Rick Barry*	SF	1962	1965	2,298	
Miami (Ohio)	Ron Harper	PG/SG	1982	1986	2,377	
Michigan	Glen Rice	SF	1985	1989	2,442	
Michigan State	Shawn Respert	PG	1990	1995	2,531	
Middle Tennessee	Desmond Yates	PF	2006	2010	1,775	
Milwaukee	Clay Tucker	SG/SF	1999	2003	1,788	
Minnesota	Mychal Thompson	C	1974	1978	1,992	
Mississippi State	Jeff Malone	SG	1979	1983	2,142	
Mississippi Valley State	Alphonso Ford	SG	1989	1993	3,165	
Missouri	Derrick Chievous	SF	1984	1988	2,580	
Missouri State	Daryel Garrison	SG	1971	1975	1,975	
Monmouth	Justin Robinson	PG	2013	2017	2,003	
Montana	Larry Krystkowiak	PF	1982	1986	2,017	
Montana State	Tyler Hall	SG	2015	2019	2,518	
Morehead State	Ricky Minard	SG/SF	2000	2004	2,381	
Morgan State	Reggie Holmes	SG	2006	2010	2,048	
Mount St. Mary's	Jack Sullivan	SF	1953	1957	2,672	
Murray State	Jeff Martin	SG	1985	1989	2,484	
Navy	David Robinson*	C	1983	1987	2,669	
NC State	Rodney Monroe	SG	1987	1991	2,551	
Nebraska	Dave Hoppen	C	1982	1986	2,167	
New Mexico	Charles Smith	SG	1993	1997	1,993	
New Mexico State	Eric Channing	SG	1998	2002	1,862	
Nevada	Nick Fazekas	PF/C	2003	2007	2,464	
New Hampshire	Tanner Leissner	PF	2014	2018	1,962	
New Orleans	Bo McCalebb	PG	2003	2008	2,679	
Niagara	Calvin Murphy*	PG	1966	1970	2,548	
Nicholls	Larry Wilson	SF	1975	1979	2,569	
NJIT	Damon Lynn	PG	2013	2017	2,153	
Norfolk State	Ralph Tally	PG	1983	1987	2,575	
North Alabama	Otis Boddie	SG	1976	1980	1,962	
North Carolina	Tyler Hansbrough	PF/C	2005	2009	2,872	
North Carolina A&T	Joe Binion	PF	1980	1984	2,143	
North Carolina Central	Ted Manning	SF	1962	1966	2,086	
North Dakota	Scott Guldseth	SF	1989	1993	2,190	
North Dakota State	Ben Woodside	PG	2005	2009	2,315	
North Florida	Dallas Moore	SG	2013	2017	2,437	
North Texas	Kenneth Lyons	PF	1979	1983	2,291	
Northeastern	Reggie Lewis	SG	1983	1987	2,709	
Northern Arizona	Cameron Jones	SG	2007	2011	1,643	
Northern Colorado	Jordan Davis	PG/SG	2015	2019	2,272	
Northern Illinois	Eugene German	PG	2016	2020	2,203	
Northern Iowa	Jason Reese	C	1986	1990	2,033	
Northern Kentucky	Marques Warrick	G	2020	2024	2,246	
Northwestern	Boo Buie^{C}	PG	2019	2024	2,165	
Northwestern State	Zeek Woodley	SG	2013	2017	2,033	
Notre Dame	Austin Carr	SG	1968	1971	2,560	
Oakland	Carvin Melson	SG	1969	1973	2,408	
Ohio	Dave Jamerson	SG	1985	1990	2,336	
Ohio State	Bruce Thornton	PG	2022	2026	2,164	
Oklahoma	Wayman Tisdale	PF	1982	1985	2,661	
Oklahoma State	Byron Houston	PF	1988	1992	2,379	
Old Dominion	Ronnie Valentine	PF	1976	1980	2,204	
Ole Miss	John Stroud	SF	1976	1980	2,328	
Omaha	Dean Thompson Jr.	PG	1980	1984	1,816	
Oral Roberts	Greg Sutton	PG	1988	1991	3,070	
Oregon	Ron Lee	PG	1972	1976	2,085	
Oregon State	Tres Tinkle	SF/PF	2015	2020	2,233	
Pacific	Ron Cornelius	C	1977	1981	2,065	
Penn	A. J. Brodeur	PF	2016	2020	1,832	
Penn State	Talor Battle	PG	2007	2011	2,213	
Pepperdine	Colbey Ross	PG	2017	2021	2,236	
Pittsburgh	Charles Smith	PF	1984	1988	2,045	
Portland	Jose Slaughter	SG	1979	1983	1,940	
Portland State	Freeman Williams	SG/SF	1974	1978	3,249	
Prairie View A&M	Zelmo Beaty*	C	1958	1962	2,285	
Presbyterian	Khalid Mutakabbir	SG	2009	2013	1,563	
Princeton	Bill Bradley*	SG/SF	1962	1965	2,503	
Providence	Ryan Gomes	SF/PF	2001	2005	2,138	
Purdue	Zach Edey	C	2020	2024	2,516	
Purdue Fort Wayne	Jarred Godfrey^{C}	SG	2018	2023	2,164	
Queens	Kenny Dye^{C}	G	2018	2023	1,897 (Note: Queens' record book currently includes only statistics beginning in its first NCAA season in 1990–91. The program is in the process of gathering past statistics.)	
Quinnipiac	Frank Vieira	SF	1953	1957	2,649	
Radford	Doug Day	SG	1989	1993	2,027	
Rhode Island	Carlton Owens	PG	1984	1988	2,114	
Rice	Mike Harris	SF	2001	2005	2,014	
Richmond	Johnny Newman	SF	1982	1986	2,383	
Rider	Darrick Suber	SG	1989	1993	2,219	
Robert Morris	Myron Walker	SG	1990	1994	1,965	
Rutgers	Phil Sellers	SF	1972	1976	2,399	
Sacramento State	Robert Martin	SG	1985	1989	1,774	
Sacred Heart	Shane Gibson	PG/SG	2008	2013	2,079	
St. Bonaventure	Greg Sanders	SF	1974	1978	2,238	
Saint Francis (PA) (Note: Saint Francis will start a transition to NCAA Division III in July 2026.)	Joe Anderson	SF	1987	1991	2,301	
St. John's	Chris Mullin*	SG/SF	1981	1985	2,440	
Saint Joseph's	Jameer Nelson	PG	2000	2004	2,094	
Saint Louis	Gibson Jimerson^{‡C}	SG	2019	2025	2,428	
Saint Mary's	Matthew Dellavedova	PG/SG	2009	2013	1,933	
Saint Peter's	Keydren Clark	PG	2002	2006	3,058	
St. Thomas						
Sam Houston	James Lister	SF/PF	1969	1973	2,304	
Samford	Craig Beard	SF	1982	1985	1,925	
San Diego	Johnny Dee	SG	2011	2015	2,046	
San Diego State	Brandon Heath	PG	2003	2007	2,189	
San Francisco	Bill Cartwright	C	1975	1979	2,116	
San Jose State	Ricky Berry	SF	1985	1988	1,767	
Santa Clara	Kevin Foster	PG/SG	2008	2013	2,423	
Seattle	Johnny O'Brien	C	1950	1953	2,733	
Seton Hall	Terry Dehere	PG/SG	1989	1993	2,494	
Siena	Marc Brown	PG	1987	1991	2,284	
SIU Edwardsville	Ray'Sean Taylor	SG	2021	2025	1,962	
SMU	Jeryl Sasser	SG	1997	2001	1,992	
South Alabama	Jeff Hodge	PG	1985	1989	2,221	
South Carolina	BJ McKie	PG	1995	1999	2,119	
South Carolina State	Harry Nickens	PG	1974	1978	1,851	
South Dakota	Tim Hatchett	SF	1986	1990	2,280	
South Dakota State	Mike Daum	PF	2015	2019	3,067	
South Florida	Charlie Bradley	SF	1981	1985	2,319	
Southeast Missouri State	Carl Ritter	PG/SG	1959	1963	1,916	
Southeastern Louisiana	C.A. Core	PF	1964	1968	2,046	
Southern	Bob Love	SF	1961	1965	2,458	(Note: Bob Love was verified as Southern's all-time leading scorer by Southern University's Rodney Kirschner, their Deputy Athletic Director at the time of email correspondences. Please see the talk page for the transcription.)
Southern Illinois	Chico Vaughn	PG/SG	1958	1962	2,088	
Southern Indiana	Alex Stein	G	2015	2019	2,219	
Southern Miss	Nick Revon	PG	1950	1954	2,136	
Southern Utah	Davor Marcelić	SF	1988	1992	1,710	
Stanford	Chasson Randle	PG	2011	2015	2,375	
Stonehill						
Stony Brook	Jameel Warney	PF	2012	2016	2,132	
Stephen F. Austin	James Silas	PG	1968	1972	1,884	
Stetson	Divine Myles	PG	2014	2018	1,845	
Syracuse	Lawrence Moten	SG	1991	1995	2,334	
Tarleton State	Chris Givens	G	1991	1996	2,104	
TCU	Darrell Browder	PG	1979	1983	1,886	
Temple	Mark Macon	PG/SG	1987	1991	2,609	
Tennessee	Allan Houston	SG	1989	1993	2,801	
Tennessee State	Dick Barnett*	SG	1955	1959	3,209	
Tennessee Tech	Earl Wise	PF	1986	1990	2,196	
Texas	Terrence Rencher	PG	1991	1995	2,306	
Texas A&M	Bernard King	SG	1999	2003	1,990	
Texas A&M–Corpus Christi	Rashawn Thomas	PF	2013	2017	2,033	
Texas Southern	Harry Kelly	SF	1979	1983	3,066	
Texas State	Nijal Pearson	SF	2016	2020	2,122	
Texas Tech	Andre Emmett	SG/SF	2000	2004	2,256	
Toledo	Ken Epperson	PF	1981	1985	2,016	
Towson	Devin Boyd	PG	1988	1993	2,000	
Troy	Wesley Person Jr.	PG/SG	2014	2018	2,063	
Tulane	Jerald Honeycutt	PF	1993	1997	2,209	
Tulsa	Shea Seals	SG	1993	1997	2,288	
UAB	Steve Mitchell	PG	1982	1986	1,866	
UC Davis	Elijah Pepper^{C}	PG/SG	2019	2024	2,284	
UC Irvine	Jerry Green	PG	1998	2002	1,993	
UC Riverside	Larry Cunningham	PG	2004	2008	1,502	
UC Santa Barbara	Orlando Johnson	SG/SF	2009	2012	1,825	
UCF	Bo Clark	SG	1975	1980	2,866	
UCLA	Don MacLean	PF	1988	1992	2,608	
UConn	Chris Smith	PG	1988	1992	2,145	
UIC	Cedrick Banks	SG	2001	2005	2,097	
UMass	Jim McCoy	SG	1988	1992	2,374	
UMass Lowell	Elad Inbar	SF	2000	2004	2,099	
UMBC	Larry Simmons	PG	1986	1990	1,802	
UNC Asheville	Bamford Jones	SG	1974	1978	1,919	
UNC Greensboro	Kyle Hines	PF/C	2004	2008	2,187	
UNC Wilmington	Brett Blizzard	SG	1999	2003	2,144	
UNLV	Eddie Owens	SF	1973	1977	2,221	
USC	Harold Miner	SG	1989	1992	2,048	
USC Upstate	Ulysses Hackett	C	1988	1992	2,688	
UT Arlington	Willie Brand	PG/SG	1987	1991	1,907	
UT Martin	Myles Taylor	PF	2011	2016	1,734	
UT Rio Grande Valley	Otto Moore (Note: Moore played his entire career at Pan American College, later known as the University of Texas–Pan American (UTPA). In 2013, UTPA and UT Brownsville were merged, with the new institution beginning operation as the University of Texas Rio Grande Valley (UTRGV) in the 2015–16 academic year. The UTRGV athletic program inherited all history and records of the UTPA program.)	PF/C	1964	1968	1,880	
Utah	Keith Van Horn	SF/PF	1993	1997	2,542	
Utah State	Jaycee Carroll	SG	2004	2008	2,522	
Utah Tech	Zach Robbins	PF/C	2009	2015 (Note: Robbins played at Utah Tech, then known as Dixie State, during the 2009–10 season before serving on an LDS Church mission to Columbus, Ohio. He then returned to play for the then-Red Storm from 2012 to 2015.)	1,470	
Utah Valley	Ryan Toolson	SG	2003	2009 (Note: Toolson played at Utah Valley during the 2003–04 season before serving on an LDS Church mission to Guatemala from 2004 to 2006. He then returned to play for the Wolverines from 2006 to 2009.)	2,163	
UTEP	Stefon Jackson	SG	2005	2009	2,456	
UTSA	Jhivvan Jackson	PG/SG	2017	2021	2,551	
Valparaiso	Alec Peters	PF	2013	2017	2,348	
Vanderbilt	Shan Foster	SG/SF	2004	2008	2,011	
VCU	Eric Maynor	PG	2005	2009	1,953	
Vermont	Eddie Benton	PG	1992	1996	2,274	
Villanova	Kerry Kittles	SG	1992	1996	2,243	
Virginia	Bryant Stith	SG	1988	1992	2,516	
Virginia Tech	Bimbo Coles	PG	1986	1990	2,484	
VMI	Reggie Williams	SG/SF	2004	2008	2,556	
Wagner	Terrance Bailey	SG	1983	1987	2,591	
Wake Forest	Dickie Hemric	PF	1951	1955	2,587	
Washington	Chris Welp	C	1983	1987	2,073	
Washington State	Isaac Fontaine	SG	1993	1997	2,003	
Weber State	Jerrick Harding	PG	2016	2020	2,247	
West Virginia	Jerry West* (Note: In addition to being inducted as a player and a member of the 1960 US Olympic team, West was also inducted to the Hall of Fame as a contributor.)	PG	1957	1960	2,309	
Western Carolina	Henry Logan	PG/SG	1964	1968	3,290	
Western Illinois	Joe Dykstra	SF	1978	1983	2,248	
Western Kentucky	Courtney Lee	SG	2004	2008	2,238	
Western Kentucky	Jim McDaniels	PF/C	1968	1971	2,238	
Western Michigan	David Kool	PG	2006	2010	2,122	
Wichita State	Cleo Littleton	SF	1951	1955	2,164	
William & Mary	Marcus Thornton	SG	2011	2015	2,178	
Winthrop	Keon Johnson	PG	2013	2017	2,076	
Wisconsin	Alando Tucker	SG/SF	2002	2007	2,217	
Wofford	George Lyons	SG/SF	1961	1965	2,521	
Wright State	Bill Edwards	SF/PF	1989	1993	2,303	
Wyoming	Fennis Dembo	SF	1984	1988	2,311	
Xavier	Byron Larkin	SG	1984	1988	2,696	
Yale	Butch Graves	SG	1980	1984	2,090	
Youngstown State	Jeff Covington	PF	1974	1978	2,424	
