= Caleb Green (basketball) =

American basketball player (born 1985)

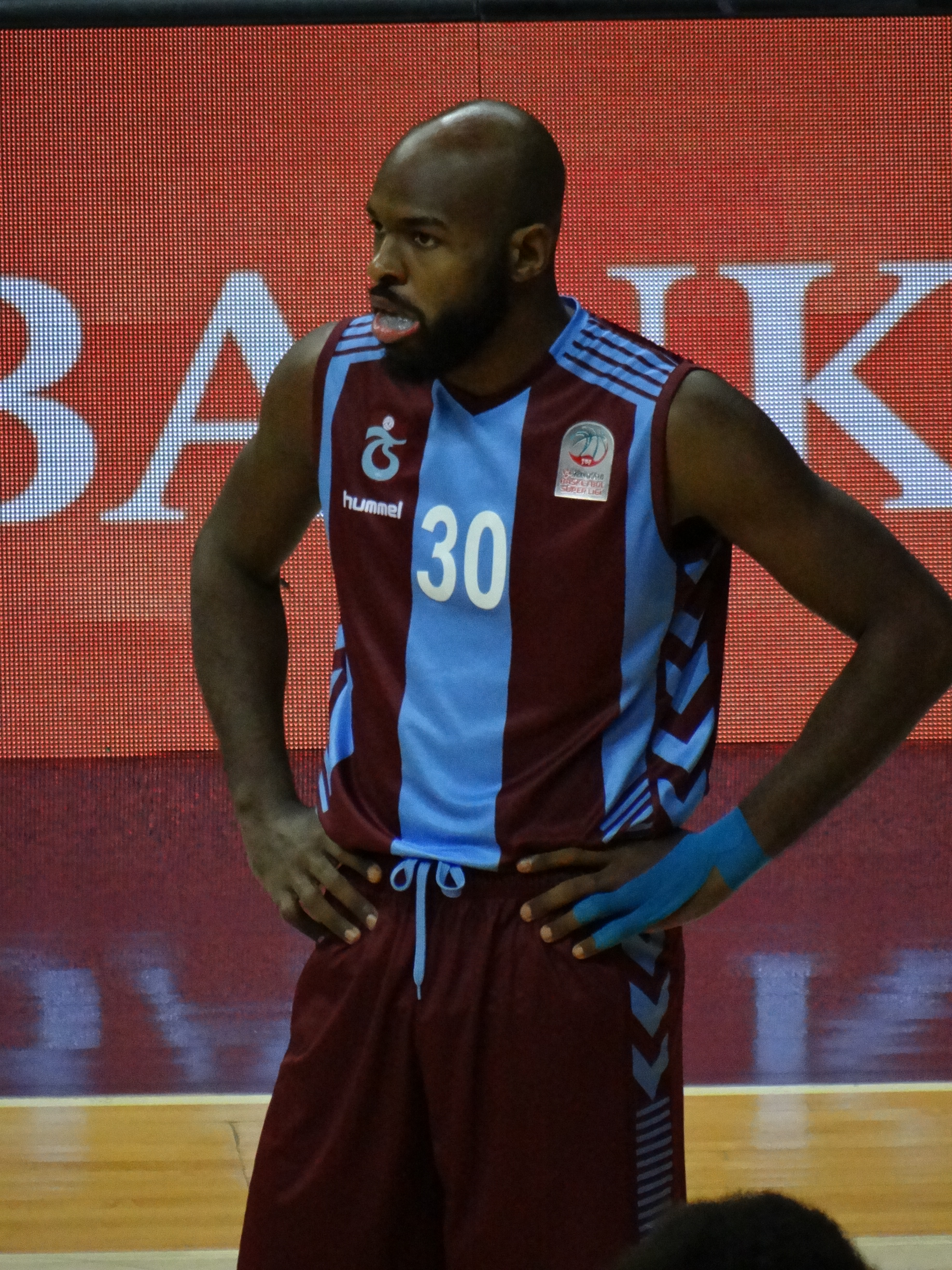

Personal information
- Born: July 10, 1985 (age 40) Tulsa, Oklahoma, U.S.
- Listed height: 6 ft 8 in (2.03 m)
- Listed weight: 238 lb (108 kg)

Career information
- High school: Tulsa Memorial (Tulsa, Oklahoma)
- College: Oral Roberts (2003–2007)
- NBA draft: 2007: undrafted
- Playing career: 2007–2020
- Position: Power forward

Career history
- 2007–2008: Trier
- 2008–2009: Mons-Hainaut
- 2009–2011: Oostende
- 2011–2012: Charleroi
- 2012–2013: Orléans Loiret
- 2013–2014: Dinamo Sassari
- 2014–2015: Málaga
- 2015–2016: Galatasaray
- 2016–2018: Trabzonspor
- 2018–2019: Felice Scandone
- 2019–2020: Wonju DB Promy

Career highlights
- EuroCup champion (2016); All-EuroCup Second Team (2014); Italian Cup winner (2014); Belgian Cup winner (2010); Bundesliga All-Star (2008); 3× MCC Player of the Year (2005–2007)

Caleb Eugene Green (born July 10, 1985) is an American former professional basketball player. Standing at 6 ft 8 in (2.03 m), he plays at the power forward position. He played college basketball for Oral Roberts University in Tulsa.

== College career ==
A Tulsa native who played for Memorial High School, Green was not recruited by the major in-state programs like the University of Oklahoma or the University of Tulsa, where he had hoped to play. Instead, Green attended Oral Roberts University, also in Tulsa, and played for four years. As a junior, he averaged 20.8 points per game and 8.8 rebounds per game, while as a senior, he averaged 20.5 points per game and 9.3 rebounds per game. Even as a freshman, Green averaged more than thirty minutes a game, as he did for his entire college career. Green also led Oral Roberts to the NCAA tournament in his junior and senior seasons. For these accomplishments, he was named the Mid Continent Conference (now Summit League) player of the year in his sophomore, junior, and senior seasons. As a senior, he was also a Wooden Award finalist. In his senior season at Oral Roberts, Green led the nation in both free throws made and attempted. He finished his senior season as the NCAA's active scoring leader. Additionally, Green set the Mid-Con Conference career scoring and rebounding records. His conference scoring record was later broken by South Dakota State's Mike Daum on December 7, 2018.

== Professional career ==
Green was not drafted by any NBA team and elected to play professionally overseas. He played one season for German club Trier averaging 17.9 points and 6.1 rebounds per game. Subsequently, Green signed with Dexia in the Belgian League. In his first season with Dexia, Green averaged 14.6 points and 6.2 rebounds per game while shooting 64.2 percent from the field. In 2009, he signed a one-year contract extension with the club, including a club-option for the 2010–2011 season. From 2009 to 2011 he played for BC Oostende. In July 2011 he signed a one-year contract with Spirou Charleroi.

In August 2012, he signed with Orléans Loiret Basket of the French LNB Pro A for the 2012–13 season.

In July 2013, he signed with Dinamo Basket Sassari of the Italian Lega Basket Serie A. He was named to the All-EuroCup Second Team in 2014.

In August 2014, he signed a one-year deal with the Spanish team Unicaja Málaga.

On July 23, 2015, Green signed a one-year deal with the Turkish club Galatasaray.

He signed a deal with Sidigas Avellino of the Italian Lega Basket Serie A on August 8, 2018.

== See also ==
- List of NCAA Division I men's basketball players with 2000 points and 1000 rebounds
- List of NCAA Division I men's basketball career free throw scoring leaders
