= Summit League Men's Basketball Player of the Year =

American basketball award

- Awarded for: most outstanding basketball player in the Summit League
- Country: United States

History
- First award: 1983
- Most recent: Carson Johnson, Denver

The Summit League Men's Basketball Player of the Year is an annual award given to the most outstanding men's basketball player in the Summit League (which had been known as the Mid-Continent Conference up until June 1, 2007). The award was first given following the 1982–83 season. Two players, Caleb Green of Oral Roberts and Mike Daum of South Dakota State, have each won the award three times. Five other players have won the award twice: Jon Collins of Eastern Illinois, Tony Bennett of Green Bay, Bryce Drew of Valparaiso, Keith Benson of Oakland, and Max Abmas of Oral Roberts.

Oral Roberts and South Dakota State have the most winners with seven each. Oakland has had three winners, but left after the 2012–13 season to join the Horizon League. Of current conference members, North Dakota, St. Thomas, and South Dakota have had no winners. However, all are among the conference's newer members, with South Dakota having joined in 2011, North Dakota in 2018, and St. Thomas in 2021.

== Key ==
†	Co-Players of the Year
*	Awarded a national player of the year award that same season: UPI College Basketball Player of the Year (1954–55 to 1995–96); Oscar Robertson Trophy (1958–59 to present); Naismith College Player of the Year (1968–69 to present); John R. Wooden Award (1976–77 to present)
Player (X)	Denotes the number of times the player has been awarded the Summit League Player of the Year award at that point

== Winners ==
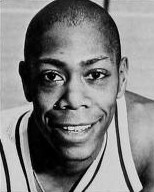
Ken McFadden, Cleveland State, 1988

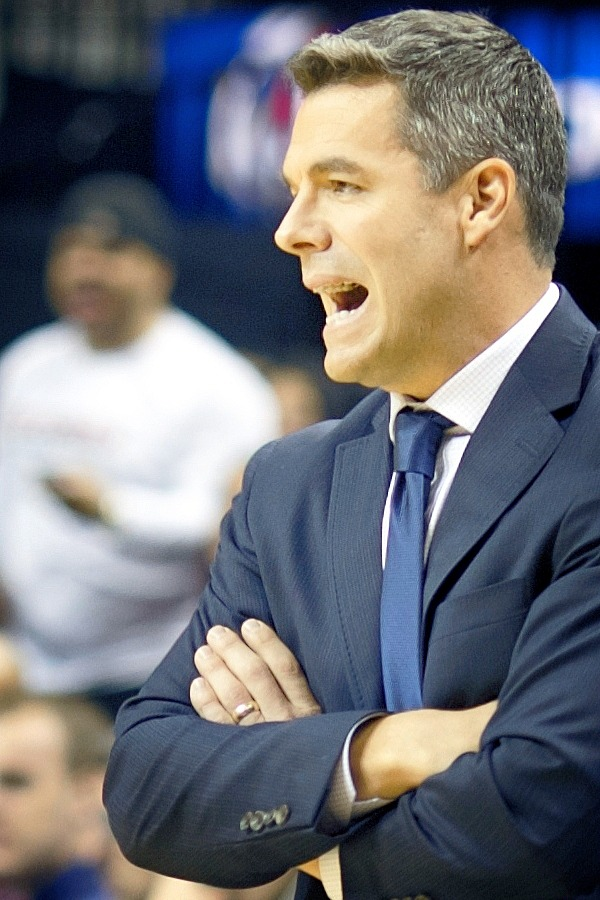
Tony Bennett, Green Bay, 1991 and 1992

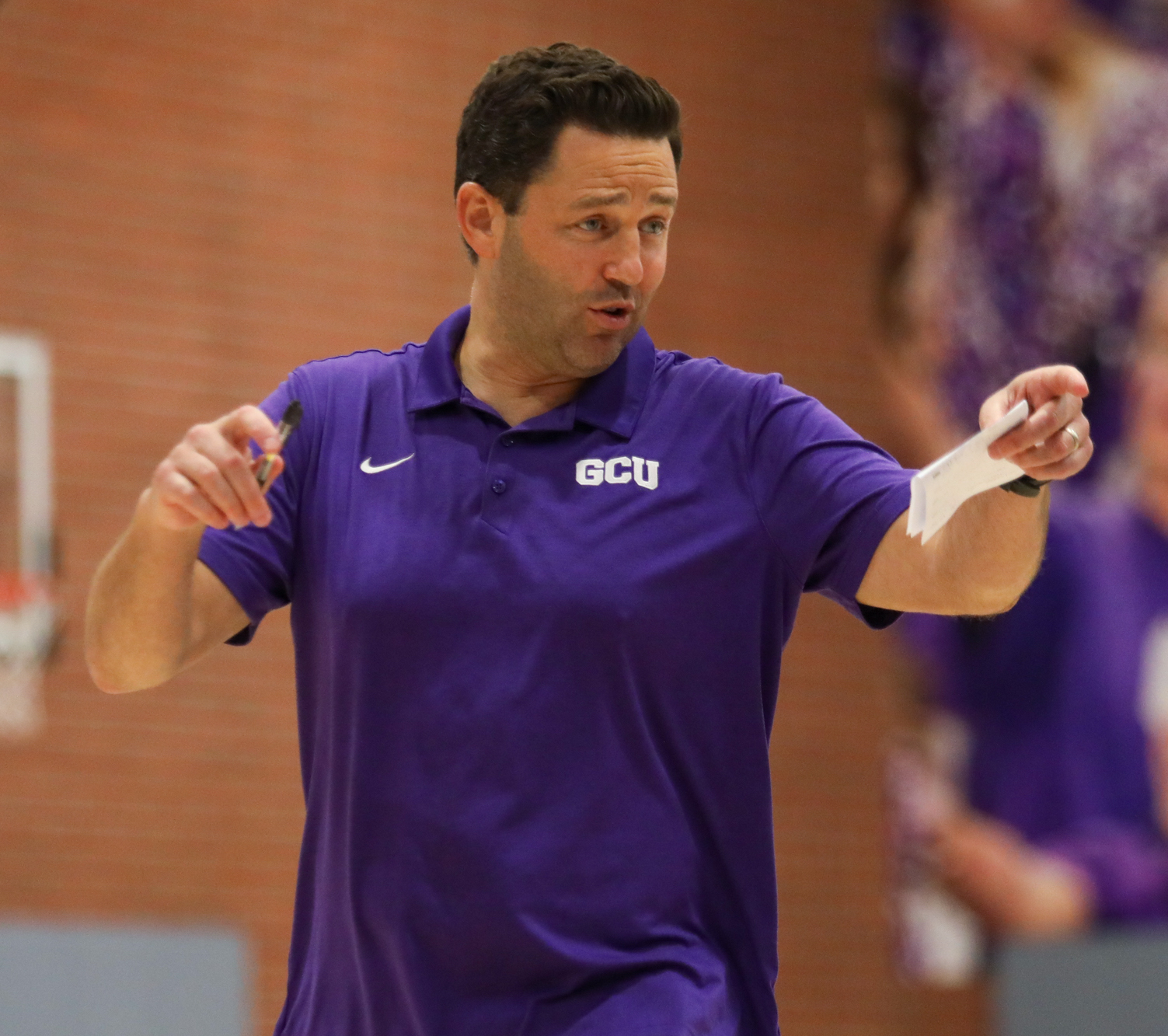
Bryce Drew, Valparaiso, 1997 and 1998

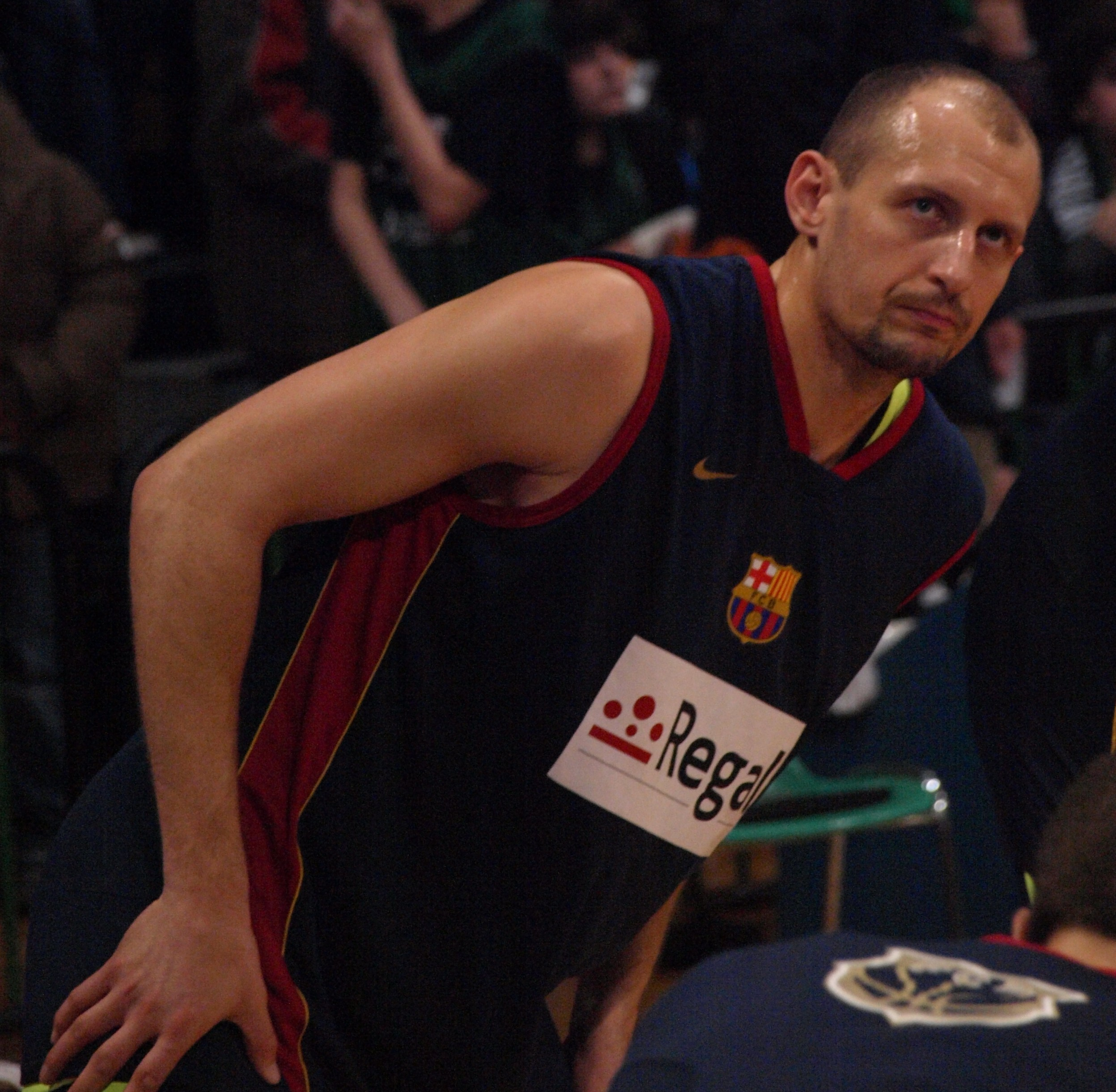
Luboš Bartoň, Valparaiso, 2002

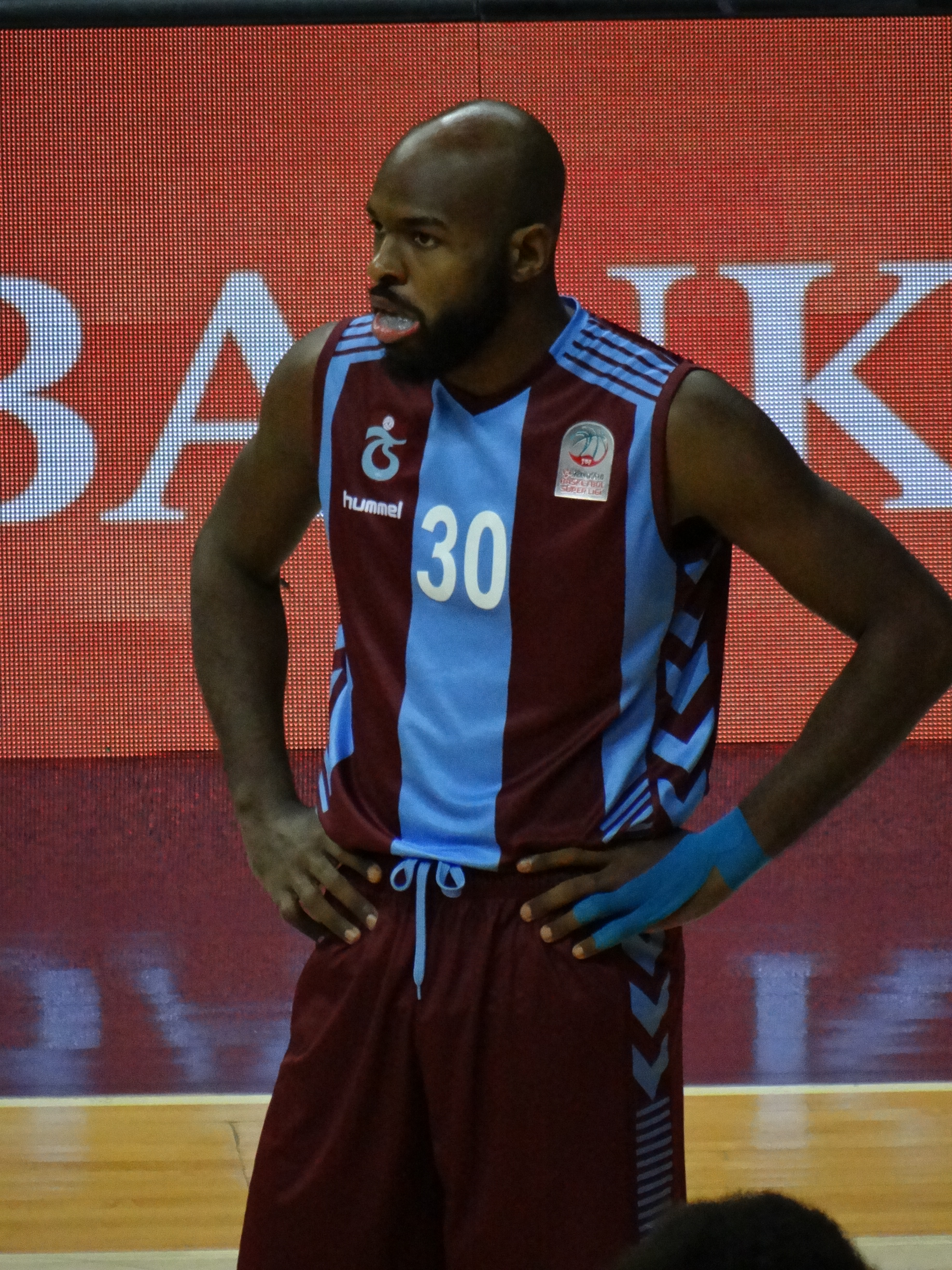
Caleb Green, Oral Roberts, 2005 through 2007

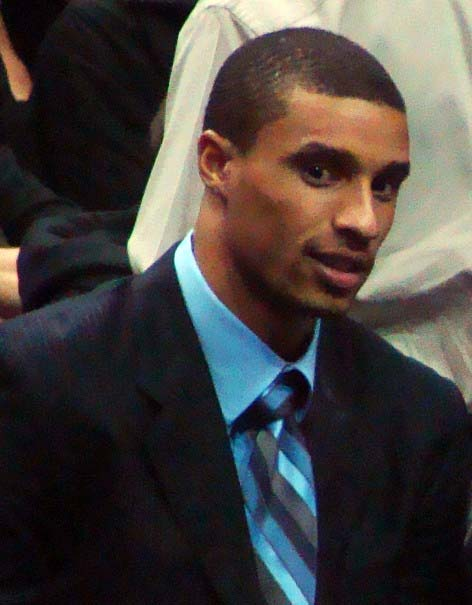
George Hill, IUPUI, 2008

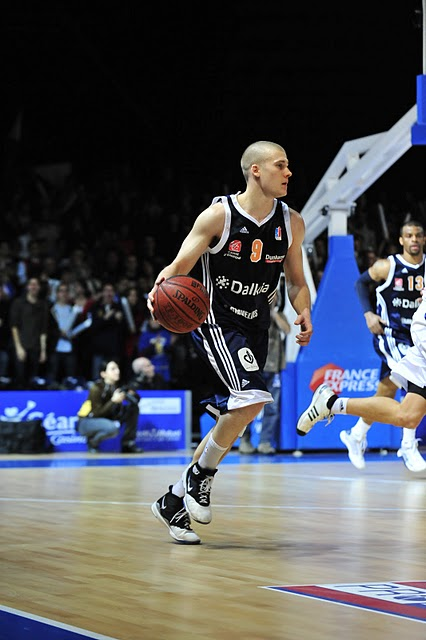
Ben Woodside, North Dakota State, 2009

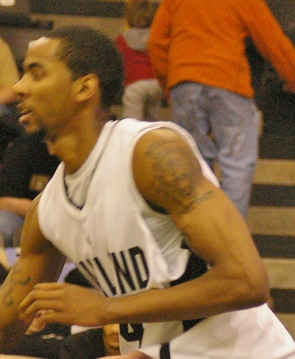
Keith Benson, Oakland, 2010 and 2011

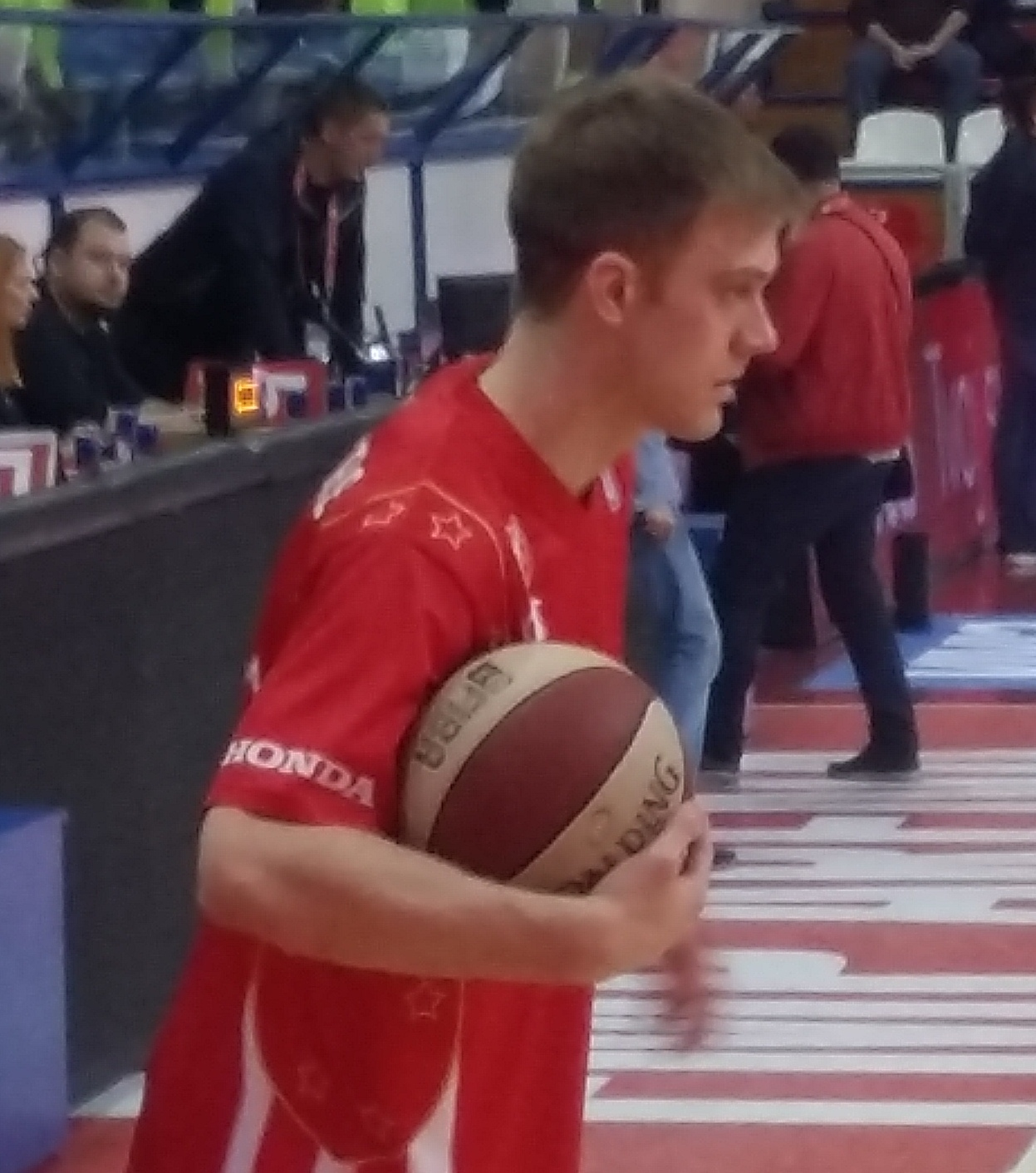
Nate Wolters, South Dakota State, 2013

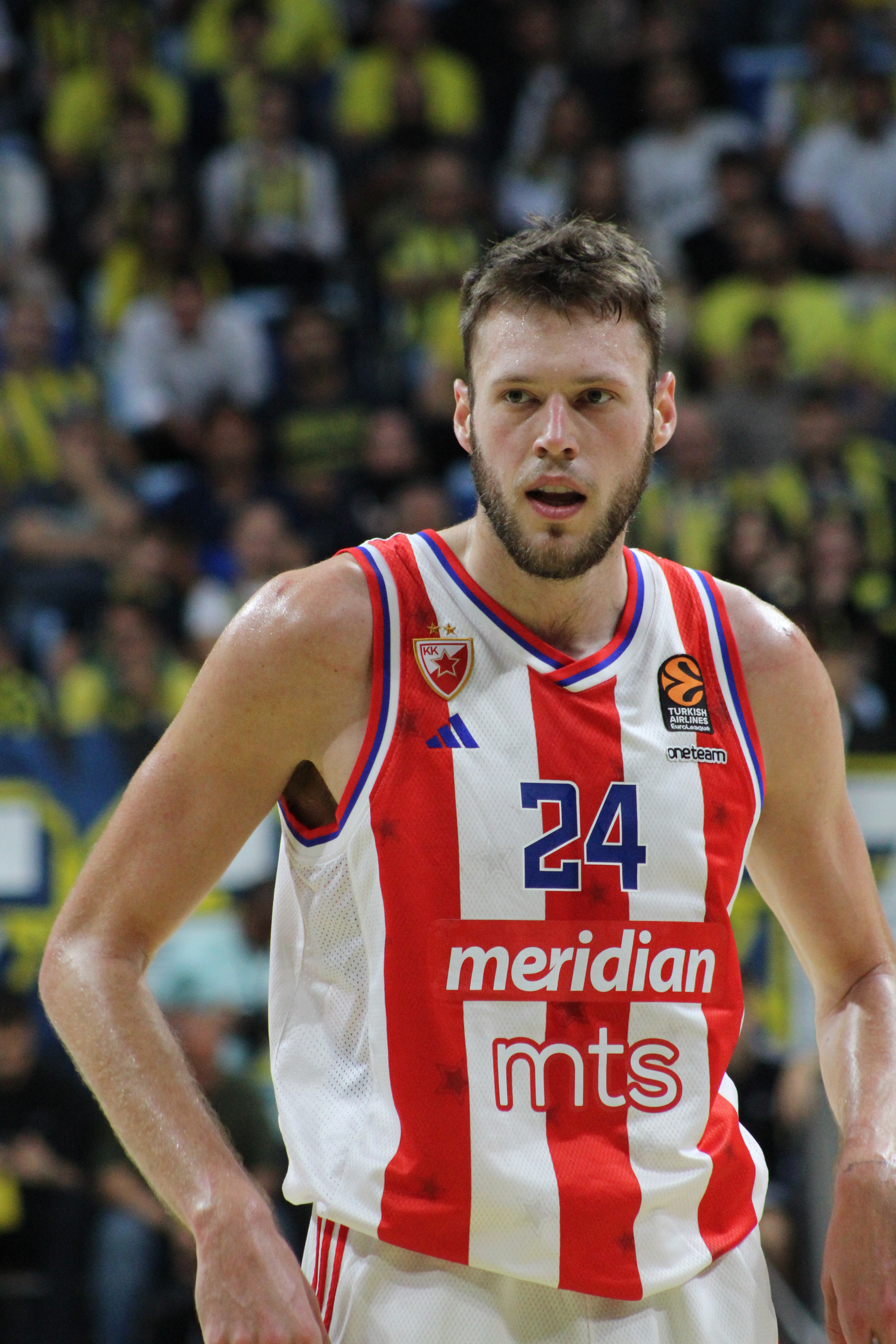
Mike Daum, South Dakota State, 2017 through 2019

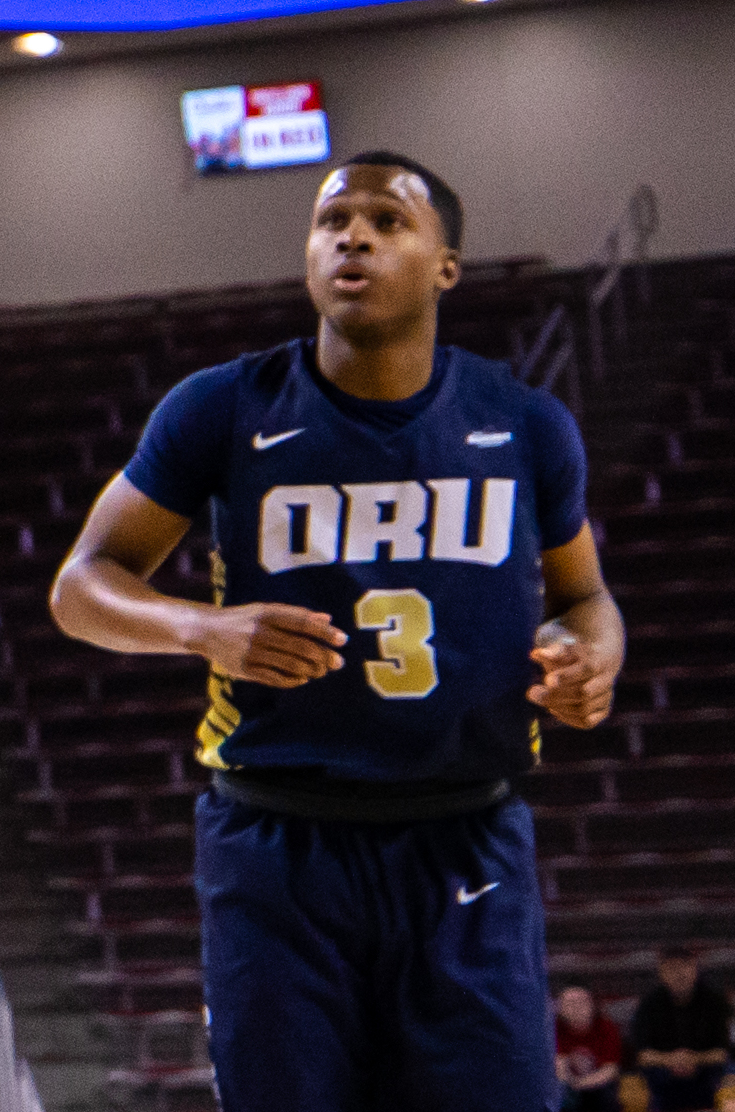
Max Abmas, Oral Roberts, 2021 and 2023

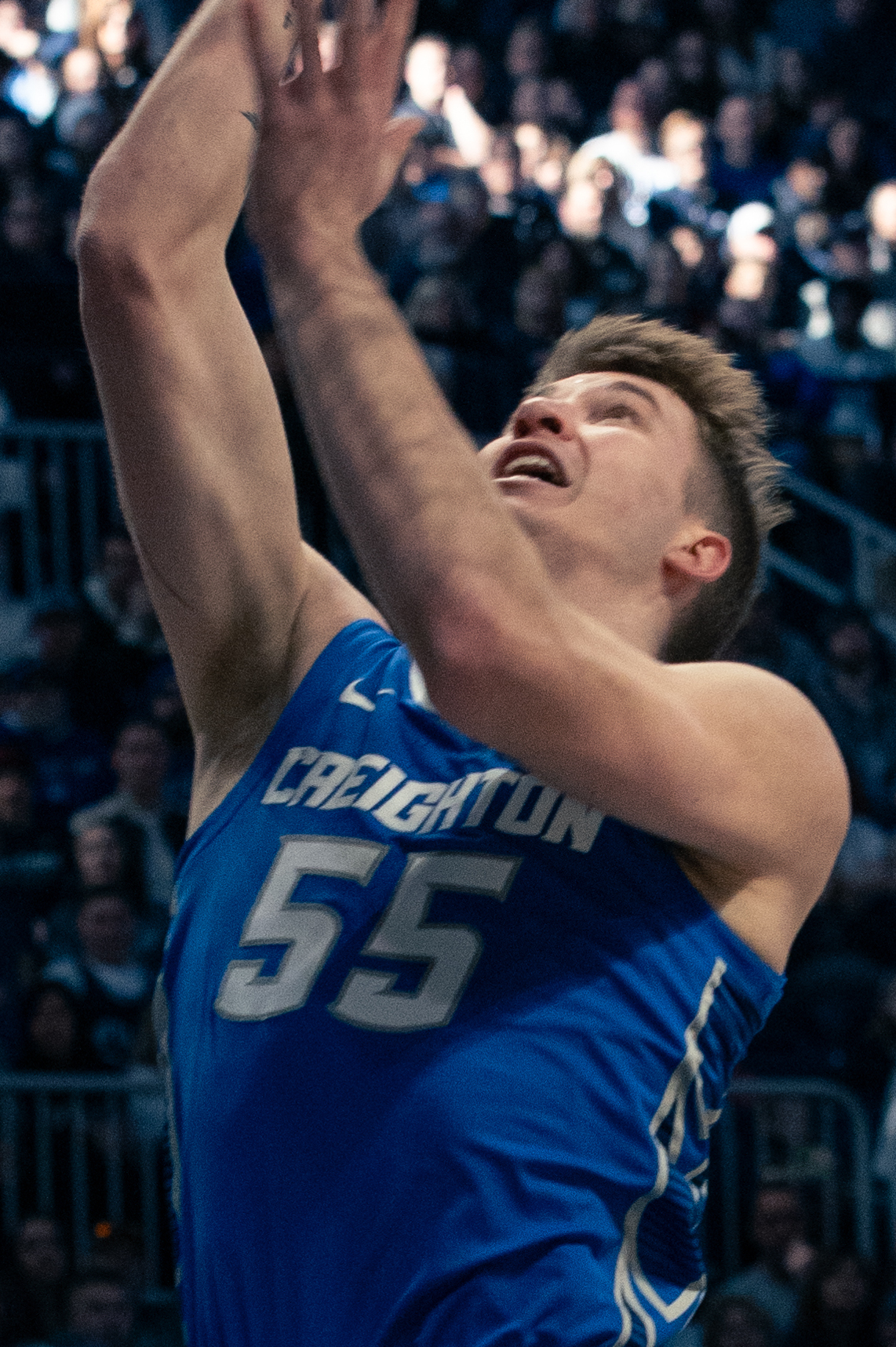
Baylor Scheierman, South Dakota State, 2022

Season	Player	School	Position	Class	Reference
1982–83	Joe Dykstra	Western Illinois	SF	Senior	
1983–84	Craig Lathen	UIC	PG	Junior	
1984–85	Jon Collins	Eastern Illinois	SF	Junior	
1985–86	Jon Collins (2)	Eastern Illinois	SF	Senior	
1986–87	Winston Garland	Missouri State	PG	Senior	
1987–88	Ken McFadden	Cleveland State	G	Junior	
1988–89	Jay Taylor	Eastern Illinois	SG	Senior	
1989–90	Lee Campbell	Missouri State	F	Senior	
1990–91	Tony Bennett	Green Bay	PG	Junior	
1991–92	Tony Bennett (2)	Green Bay	PG	Senior	
1992–93	Bill Edwards	Wright State	SF	Senior	
1993–94	Kenny Williams	UIC	PG	Senior	
1994–95	David Redmon	Valparaiso	G	Senior	
1995–96	Anthony Allison	Valparaiso	SF	Senior	
1996–97	Bryce Drew	Valparaiso	PG	Junior	
1997–98	Bryce Drew (2)	Valparaiso	PG	Senior	
1998–99	Chad Wilkerson	Oral Roberts	SF / PF	Junior	
1999–00	Michael Jackson	Kansas City	C	Sophomore	
2000–01	Jeff Monaco	Southern Utah	PG	Senior	
2001–02	Luboš Bartoň	Valparaiso	PF	Senior	
2002–03	Mike Helms	Oakland	G	Junior	
2003–04	Odell Bradley	IUPUI	SF / SG	Sophomore	
2004–05	Caleb Green	Oral Roberts	PF	Sophomore	
2005–06	Caleb Green (2)	Oral Roberts	PF	Junior	
2006–07	Caleb Green (3)	Oral Roberts	PF	Senior	
2007–08	George Hill	IUPUI	PG / SG	Junior	
2008–09	Ben Woodside	North Dakota State	PG	Senior	
2009–10	Keith Benson	Oakland	C	Junior	
2010–11	Keith Benson (2)	Oakland	C	Senior	
2011–12	Dominique Morrison	Oral Roberts	SF	Senior	
2012–13	Nate Wolters	South Dakota State	PG	Senior	
2013–14	Taylor Braun	North Dakota State	PG	Senior	
2014–15	Lawrence Alexander	North Dakota State	SG	Senior	
2015–16	Max Landis	Purdue Fort Wayne	SG	Senior	
2016–17	Mike Daum	South Dakota State	PF	Sophomore	
2017–18	Mike Daum (2)	South Dakota State	PF	Junior	
2018–19	Mike Daum (3)	South Dakota State	PF	Senior	
2019–20	Douglas Wilson	South Dakota State	SF	Junior	
2020–21	Max Abmas	Oral Roberts	PG / SG	Sophomore	
2021–22	Baylor Scheierman	South Dakota State	SG	Junior	
2022–23	Max Abmas (2)	Oral Roberts	PG / SG	Senior	
2023–24	Zeke Mayo	South Dakota State	SG	Junior	
2024–25	Marquel Sutton	Omaha	SF	Senior	
2025–26	Carson Johnson	Denver	SG	Sophomore	

== Winners by school ==
In this table, the "year joined" refers to the calendar year in which each school joined the conference. The "Years" column reflects the calendar years in which each award was presented.

School (year joined)	Winners	Years
Oral Roberts (1997, 2014) (Note: Oral Roberts left in 2012 for the Southland Conference and rejoined the Summit League in 2014.)	7	1999, 2005, 2006, 2007, 2012, 2021, 2023
South Dakota State (2007)	7	2013, 2017, 2018, 2019, 2020, 2022, 2024
Valparaiso (1982) (Note: Valparaiso left in 2007 for the Horizon League, and is now in the Missouri Valley Conference (MVC).)	5	1995, 1996, 1997, 1998, 2002
Eastern Illinois (1982) (Note: Eastern Illinois left in 1996 for the Ohio Valley Conference.)	3	1985, 1986, 1989
North Dakota State (2007)	3	2009, 2014, 2015
Oakland (1998) (Note: Oakland left in 2013 for the Horizon League.)	3	2003, 2010, 2011
Green Bay (1982) (Note: Illinois–Chicago (UIC), Wisconsin-Green Bay (Green Bay), Cleveland State, and Wright State left in 1994 for the Midwestern Collegiate Conference, now known as the Horizon League. All remain in the Horizon today except for UIC, now an MVC member.)	2	1991, 1992
IUPUI (1998) (Note: IUPUI left in 2017 for the Horizon League. The program now plays as IU Indy following the 2024 dissolution of Indiana University–Purdue University Indianapolis and its replacement by separate institutions affiliated with the Indiana University and Purdue University systems.)	2	2004, 2008
Missouri State (1982) (Note: Missouri State left in 1990 for the Missouri Valley Conference, and joined Conference USA in 2025.)	2	1987, 1990
UIC (1982)	2	1984, 1994
Cleveland State (1982)	1	1988
Denver (2013) (Note: Denver left for the West Coast Conference in 2026.)	1	2026
Kansas City (1994, 2020) (Note: Kansas City left in 2013 for the Western Athletic Conference and rejoined the Summit League in 2020.)	1	2000
Omaha (2012)	1	2025
Purdue Fort Wayne (2007) (Note: Purdue Fort Wayne inherited its athletic program from the former Indiana University–Purdue University Fort Wayne (IPFW), which was dissolved after the 2017–18 season with the creation of separate Indiana University and Purdue University-affiliated institutions.) (Note: Purdue Fort Wayne left in 2020 for the Horizon League.)	1	2016
Southern Utah (1997) (Note: Southern Utah left in 2012 for the Big Sky Conference, moved to the Western Athletic Conference in 2022, and rejoined the Big Sky in 2026.)	1	2001
Western Illinois (1982) (Note: Western Illinois left in 2023 for the Ohio Valley Conference.)	1	1983
Wright State (1991)	1	1993
Centenary (2003) (Note: Centenary left in 2011 to begin a transition to NCAA Division III.)	0	—
North Dakota (2018)	0	—
St. Thomas (2021)	0	—
South Dakota (2011)	0	—
