= David Redmon =

American basketball player

Personal information
- Born: September 19, 1972
- Died: January 15, 2023 (aged 50) Columbus, Ohio, U.S.
- Listed height: 6 ft 5 in (1.96 m)

Career information
- High school: Valparaiso HS (Valparaiso, Indiana)
- College: Little Rock (1990–1991); Valparaiso (1992–1995)
- NBA draft: 1995: undrafted
- Position: Guard

Career highlights
- MCC Player of the Year (1995); 2× First-team All-MCC (1994, 1995); MCC All-Newcomer team (1993)

David Redmon (September 19, 1972 – January 15, 2023) was an American professional basketball player. He played college basketball for the Arkansas–Little Rock Trojans and Valparaiso Crusaders. Redmon was the Mid-Continent Conference (MCC) Player of the Year during his senior season with the Crusaders in 1995. He played professionally in Poland.

== Playing career ==
Redmon played basketball at Valparaiso High School in Valparaiso, Indiana. He began his collegiate career with the Arkansas–Little Rock Trojans during the 1990–91 season and averaged 6.5 points per game. On June 3, 1991, he transferred to the Valparaiso Crusaders; the move reunited him with his high school teammate Casey Schmidt. He was selected as a member of the Mid-Continent Conference (MCC) All-Newcomer team in 1993. Redmon was chosen as the MCC Player of the Year in 1995, and named to the All-MCC first-team in 1994 and 1995. He finished his Crusaders career with 1,470 points and ranks 11th in program history. Redmon was inducted into the Valparaiso University Athletics Hall of Fame in 2004.

Redmon was selected in the seventh round of the 1995 United States Basketball League (USBL) draft by the New Jersey Turnpikes. He became the first Crusaders player to be selected by a professional basketball league. Redmon had never heard of the USBL and instead preferred to play overseas. He played professionally in Poland for two years.

== Post-playing career and death ==
After his playing career, Redmon was the owner of a sports restaurant in Illinois. He worked as a supervisor for ADT Inc. during the last nine years of his life. Redmon had one son.

Redmon died on January 15, 2023, at his home in Columbus, Ohio.
