= Joe Dykstra =

American basketball player

Personal information
- Listed height: 6 ft 6 in (1.98 m)
- Listed weight: 215 lb (98 kg)

Career information
- High school: Herbert Hoover (Des Moines, Iowa)
- College: Western Illinois (1978–1983)
- NBA draft: 1983: 9th round, 204th overall pick
- Drafted by: Phoenix Suns
- Position: Small forward

Career highlights
- MCC Player of the Year (1983); First-team All-MCC (1983); 2× Second-team All-MCC (1980, 1981); MCC Tournament MOP (1981)
- Stats at Basketball Reference

Joseph Dykstra is an American former professional basketball player best known for his college career at Western Illinois University from 1978 to 1983, where he set numerous records and was named the Summit League's first ever men's basketball player of the year. Through the 2022–23 season he is still Western Illinois' all-time leading scorer with 2,248 points.

== Playing career ==
=== High school ===
Dykstra lived in The Hague, Netherlands for some of his childhood, including his freshman year in high school. His father felt the basketball competition was weak and so he moved the family back to Des Moines, Iowa, where as a sophomore at Herbert Hoover High School Dykstra became a starter for the varsity basketball team. Over the next three seasons he would go on to become the Metropolitan Conference's all-time leading scorer with 1,488 points. As a senior in 1977–78 he was the leading vote-getter in the Des Moines Tribune's all-area team.

=== College ===
After high school, Dykstra wanted to stay in the Midwest, but his top five preferred schools all gave scholarships to other players. He cited he always wanted to play in the Big Ten Conference, so when the Western Illinois Leathernecks offered him a scholarship (who were in NCAA Division II at the time), Dykstra played "with a chip on [his] shoulder."

In his true freshman season of 1978–79, he appeared in three games and scored 24 points before he broke his foot, which required a cast and caused him to medically redshirt the rest of the season. The following season he appeared in 28 games and averaged 14 points and 5.4 rebounds per game and was named to the All-Mid-Continent Conference (Summit League) Second Team.

The following season, Dykstra's sophomore season, he upped his averages to 21.7 points, 6.5 rebounds, and 1.5 steals per game and led Western Illinois to finish as runners-up in the Mid-Continent Conference Tournament. He was named the tournament's most outstanding player and also repeated as an All-MCC Second Team selection.

In 1980–81, Dykstra's junior season, Western Illinois had moved up to NCAA Division I and classified as an independent (i.e. no conference affiliation). He averaged 21.1 points and 6.3 rebounds per game. On January 4, 1982, he broke the Division I all-time record for consecutive free throws made after he made his first eight attempts against Eastern Kentucky, reaching 64 before missing two free throws that game to finish 14-of-16. The previous record was set in 1967 by Rutgers' Bob Lloyd (Dykstra's record has since been broken). Also during the 1981–82 season, not only did Dykstra finish third in all of Division I basketball in individual free throw percentage (91.3%), but Western Illinois finished first in team free throw percentage (78.6%).

As a senior in 1982–83, Western Illinois had re-joined the Mid-Continent Conference, which was now a Division I athletics conference. The Leathernecks won the regular season conference championship with Dykstra leading the way. He averaged 21.0 points, 5.6 rebounds, 2.6 assists and 1.4 steals per game. He was named to the All-MCC First Team and also the first ever MCC Player of the Year. Dykstra surpassed Coleman Carrodine as Western Illinois' all-time leading scorer, finishing his career with 2,248 points.

Dykstra was inducted into Western Illinois' athletics hall of fame in 1994.

=== Professional ===
Dykstra was selected in the 1983 NBA draft by the Phoenix Suns. The Suns took him as the 20th pick in the 9th round (204th overall). He never made their final roster prior to the start of the 1983–84 NBA season, however. Dykstra instead went overseas to play professionally, where he had stints in France, England, and Australia.

== Post-basketball life ==
In August 1989, Joe Dykstra began his career at Westwood Financial in the Los Angeles, California area. He stayed at Westwood Financial for nearly 30 years and became their CEO in 2016. After two-plus years he left the company to become the President of Sterling Logistics Properties in West Palm Beach, Florida. As of September 2022 he is still at Sterling Organization.

== See also ==
- List of NCAA Division I men's basketball career scoring leaders
