= Jon Collins =

American basketball player

Personal information
- Listed height: 6 ft 4 in (1.93 m)

Career information
- High school: Cahokia (Cahokia, Illinois)
- College: Eastern Illinois (1982–1986)
- NBA draft: 1986: 5th round, 110th overall pick
- Drafted by: Denver Nuggets
- Position: Shooting guard

Career highlights
- 2× MCC Player of the Year (1985, 1986); 3× First-team All-MCC (1984–1986)
- Stats at Basketball Reference

Jon Collins is an American former basketball player, best known for his collegiate career at Eastern Illinois University between 1982–83 and 1985–86. At the time of his graduation, Collins scored a then-school record 1,702 points, was one of five players to have been an All-Mid Continent Conference First Team honoree three times, and was twice named the Mid-Continent Conference Player of the Year (later named The Summit League).

In each of Collins' final three seasons he averaged over 18 points per game and scored over 500 total points. During that span, he reached double figures in 87 of 90 games, including a school-record 53 straight. As a junior in 1984–85, he led the team to a 20–10 overall record and their first Mid-Continent Conference championship. Both the Associated Press and Sporting News named him an honorable mention All-American that year. As a senior, Collins garnered another honorable mention nod by the Sporting News as he earned his second consecutive conference player of the year award, becoming the first player in conference history to do so.

The Denver Nuggets selected Collins in the fifth round of the 1986 NBA draft, but he never played in the league. After a professional basketball career he worked for Allstate insurance. Eastern Illinois inducted him into their athletics hall of fame in 1993.
