= Carson Johnson =

American basketball player

No. 20 – Denver Pioneers
- Position: Point guard / shooting guard
- League: Summit League

Personal information
- Listed height: 6 ft 1 in (1.85 m)
- Listed weight: 180 lb (82 kg)

Career information
- High school: Ankeny (Ankeny, Iowa)
- College: MSU–Moorhead (2024–2025); Denver (2025–present)

Career highlights
- Summit League Player of the Year (2026); First-team All-Summit League (2026); Summit League Newcomer of the Year (2026); First-team All-NSIC (2025); NSIC Newcomer of the Year (2025); NSIC tournament MVP (2025)

Carson Johnson is an American college basketball player for the Denver Pioneers of the Summit League. He previously played at Minnesota State–Moorhead.

== Early life and high school ==
Johnson grew up in Ankeny, Iowa and attended Ankeny High School. He committed to play college basketball at NCAA Division II Minnesota State–Moorhead.

== College career ==
Johnson began his college basketball career at Minnesota State–Moorhead. He averaged 19.8 points and 3.0 assists per game as a freshman and was named the Northern Sun Intercollegiate Conference (NSIC) Newcomer of the Year and first-team All-NSIC. Johnson was also named the MVP of the 2025 NSIC tournament after scoring 78 points over three games. After the end of the season and the departure of MSU–Moorhead head coach Tim Bergstraser, he entered the NCAA transfer portal.

Johnson transferred to Denver, following Bergstraser. He was named the Summit League Player of the Year, Newcomer of the Year, and first-team all-conference at the end of the regular season.
