= Mike Daum =

American basketball player (born 1995)

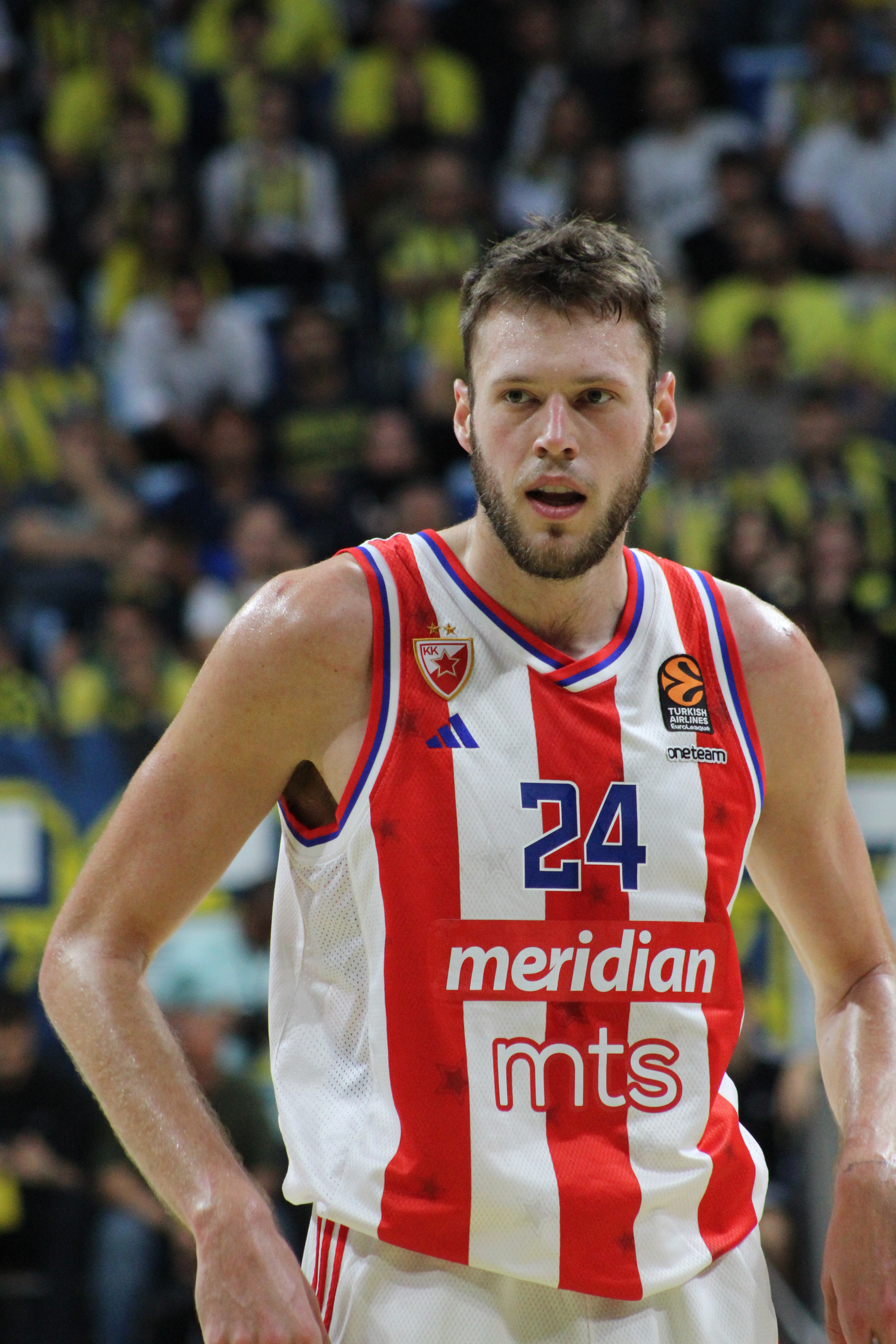
- Daum with Crvena zvezda in 2024.

No. 24 – Shinshu Brave Warriors
- Position: Power forward / center
- League: B.League

Personal information
- Born: October 30, 1995 (age 30) Scottsbluff, Nebraska, U.S.
- Listed height: 2.06 m (6 ft 9 in)
- Listed weight: 107 kg (236 lb)

Career information
- High school: Kimball (Kimball, Nebraska)
- College: South Dakota State (2015–2019)
- NBA draft: 2019: undrafted
- Playing career: 2019–present

Career history
- 2019–2021: Obradoiro
- 2021–2023: Derthona Basket
- 2023–2024: Anadolu Efes
- 2024–2025: Crvena zvezda
- 2025–present: Shinshu Brave Warriors

Career highlights
- Third-team All-American – NABC, USBWA (2019); 3× AP honorable mention All-American (2017–2019); 3× Summit League Player of the Year (2017–2019); 4× First-team All-Summit League (2016–2019); Summit League Sixth Man of the Year (2016); Summit League Freshman of the Year (2016); Summit League All-Freshman Team (2016); 3× Summit League tournament MVP (2016–2018)

Michael Alan Daum (born October 30, 1995) is an American professional basketball player for the Shinshu Brave Warriors of the B.League. He played college basketball for South Dakota State University. A 6 ft 9 in (2.06 m) power forward, Daum was named the Summit League Player of the Year three times.

== College career ==
Daum came to South Dakota State from small town Kimball, Nebraska in 2014. After sitting out his first year as a redshirt to gain strength and improve, he mostly came off the bench for the Jackrabbits in the 2015–16 season.

Despite not starting, Daum averaged 15.2 points and 6.2 rebounds per game and was named the Summit League's Sixth Man of the Year and first-team all-conference. Daum's ability to score both inside and from three-point range earned him the nickname "The Dauminator".

As a redshirt sophomore, Daum became a full-time starter and was named the preseason Summit League Player of the Year. After averaging 25.1 points and 8.1 rebounds per game, Daum made good on this prediction by winning the conference Player of the Year award at the conclusion of the season. During the season, Daum scored a season-high 51 points in a conference win over Fort Wayne.

Prior to the start of the 2017–18 season, Daum was named the preseason Summit League Player of the Year and was named to the preseason watch lists for the Oscar Robertson Trophy, the Karl Malone Award and the Lute Olson Award. On February 1, 2018, Daum eclipsed the 2,000-career-point milestone. Following his junior season, Daum declared for the 2018 NBA draft without signing with an agent. He subsequently decided to exercise this option and return for his senior season.

Coming into his senior year, Daum was named Preseason Summit League Player of the Year. On December 7, 2018, Daum became the Summit League’s all-time leading scorer. In a 42-point outing against Southern, Daum passed former Oral Roberts forward Caleb Green’s conference record 2,504 points. On December 18, 2018, he collected his 1,000th rebound. On February 23, 2019, Daum became the tenth player in NCAA Division I history to score 3,000 points.

== Professional career ==
Daum was available for the 2019 NBA draft, but was not selected. He was subsequently signed by the Portland Trail Blazers to a summer league contract.

On July 27, 2019, Daum signed his first professional contract with Monbus Obradoiro of the Liga ACB. Daum averaged 9.0 points per game, 0.4 assists per game and 3.7 rebounds per game. He re-signed with the team on July 21, 2020.

On July 22, 2021, Daum signed with the newly promoted in the Italian Serie A, Derthona Basket.

On November 29, 2023, he signed with Anadolu Efes of the Turkish Basketball Super League (BSL).

== Career statistics ==
Legend
GP	Games played	GS	Games started	MPG	Minutes per game
FG%	Field-goal percentage	3P%	3-point field-goal percentage	FT%	Free-throw percentage
RPG	Rebounds per game	APG	Assists per game	SPG	Steals per game
BPG	Blocks per game	PPG	Points per game	PIR	Performance index rating
**Bold**	Career high

=== EuroLeague ===
Year	Team	GP	GS	MPG	FG%	3P%	FT%	RPG	APG	SPG	BPG	PPG	PIR
2023–24	Anadolu Efes	11	4	19.8	.535	.413	1.000	2.2	.3	.5	.2	9.4	7.6
Career		11	4	19.8	.535	.413	1.000	2.2	.3	.5	.2	9.4	7.6

=== Basketball Champions League ===
Year	Team	GP	GS	MPG	FG%	3P%	FT%	RPG	APG	SPG	BPG	PPG
2023–24	Derthona Tortona	3	3	27.6	.667	.667	.667	6.67	2.0	1.3	.7	12.0
Career		3	3	27.6	.667	.667	.667	6.67	2.0	1.3	.7	12.0

=== Domestic leagues ===
Year	Team	League	GP	MPG	FG%	3P%	FT%	RPG	APG	SPG	BPG	PPG
2019–20	(Spain) Obradoiro	ACB	23	19.8	.494	.449	.744	3.6	.4	.7	.3	9.0
2020–21	(Spain) Obradoiro	ACB	30	21.6	.430	.366	.815	4.4	.5	.5	.2	9.7
2021–22	(Italy) Derthona Tortona	LBA	36	25.1	.444	.369	.890	5.7	.8	.6	.5	12.2
2022–23	(Italy) Derthona Tortona	LBA	32	23.6	.469	.313	.844	5.8	.9	.5	.4	10.7
2023–24	(Italy) Derthona Tortona	LBA	9	27.0	.511	.341	.810	7.1	1.2	.7	.3	14.1
2023–24	(Turkey) Anadolu Efes	TBSL	9	22.4	.403	.216	1.000	4.7	.9	.8	.2	8.0

=== College ===
Year	Team	GP	GS	MPG	FG%	3P%	FT%	RPG	APG	SPG	BPG	PPG
2014–15	South Dakota State	Redshirt										
2015–16	South Dakota State	34	3	20.8	**.553**	**.446**	.824	6.1	.8	.5	.3	15.2
2016–17	South Dakota State	**35**	**35**	32.7	.514	.418	**.869**	8.1	1.4	.6	.4	25.1
2017–18	South Dakota State	**35**	**35**	31.1	.462	.425	.851	10.3	1.3	.5	.7	23.9
2018–19	South Dakota State	33	33	**33.3**	.512	.370	.838	**11.7**	**1.8**	**.7**	**1.0**	**25.3**
Career		137	106	29.5	.504	.410	.848	9.0	1.3	.6	.6	22.4

== The Basketball Tournament ==
Daum joined House of 'Paign, a team composed primarily of Illinois alumni in The Basketball Tournament 2020. He led all scorers with 21 points and 10 rebounds in a 76–53 win over War Tampa in the first round. Daum scored 23 points as the team upset Carmen's Crew 76–68 in the second round.

== See also ==
- List of NCAA Division I men's basketball career scoring leaders
- List of NCAA Division I men's basketball career free throw scoring leaders
- List of NCAA Division I men's basketball players with 2000 points and 1000 rebounds
