= List of NCAA Division I men's basketball career free throw scoring leaders =

In basketball, a free throw is "an opportunity given to a player to score one (1) point, uncontested, from position behind the free throw line and inside the semicircle." The National Collegiate Athletic Association's (NCAA) Division I is the highest level of amateur basketball in the United States. The NCAA did not split into its current divisions format until August 1973. From 1906 to 1955, there were no classifications to the NCAA nor its predecessor, the Intercollegiate Athletic Association of the United States (IAAUS). Then, from 1956 to spring 1973, colleges were classified as either "NCAA University Division (Major College)" or "NCAA College Division (Small College)".

The all-time leader in NCAA free throws made is Tyler Hansbrough of North Carolina. From 2005–06 through 2008–09, Hansbrough made 982 free throws, surpassing the 54-year-old record of 905 that was held by Wake Forest's Dickie Hemric. While Hansbrough's free throw percentage (79.1%) is better than Hemric's (66.6%), Hemric accomplished the feat in only 104 career games played compared to Hansbrough's 142.

Five players on this list are Naismith Memorial Basketball Hall of Fame inductees: Pete Maravich, Oscar Robertson, Bill Bradley Joe Dumars, and Alonzo Mourning. Some players on this list, such as those whose career games played is below 100, played college basketball during the era before freshmen were allowed to play varsity basketball, and were instead allowed to play freshman or junior varsity basketball only. Their free throw makes and attempts could have been significantly higher had they played an additional season.

== Key ==
Pos.	G	F	C	FTM	FTA	FT%	Ref.
Position	Guard	Forward	Center	Free throws made	Free throws attempted	Free throw %	References

^	Player still competing in NCAA Division I
*	Inducted into the Naismith Memorial Basketball Hall of Fame
C	Player was active in the 2020–21 season, benefiting from the NCAA's blanket COVID-19 eligibility waiver
Team (X)	Denotes the number of times a player from that team appears on the list

== Top 25 career free throw leaders ==
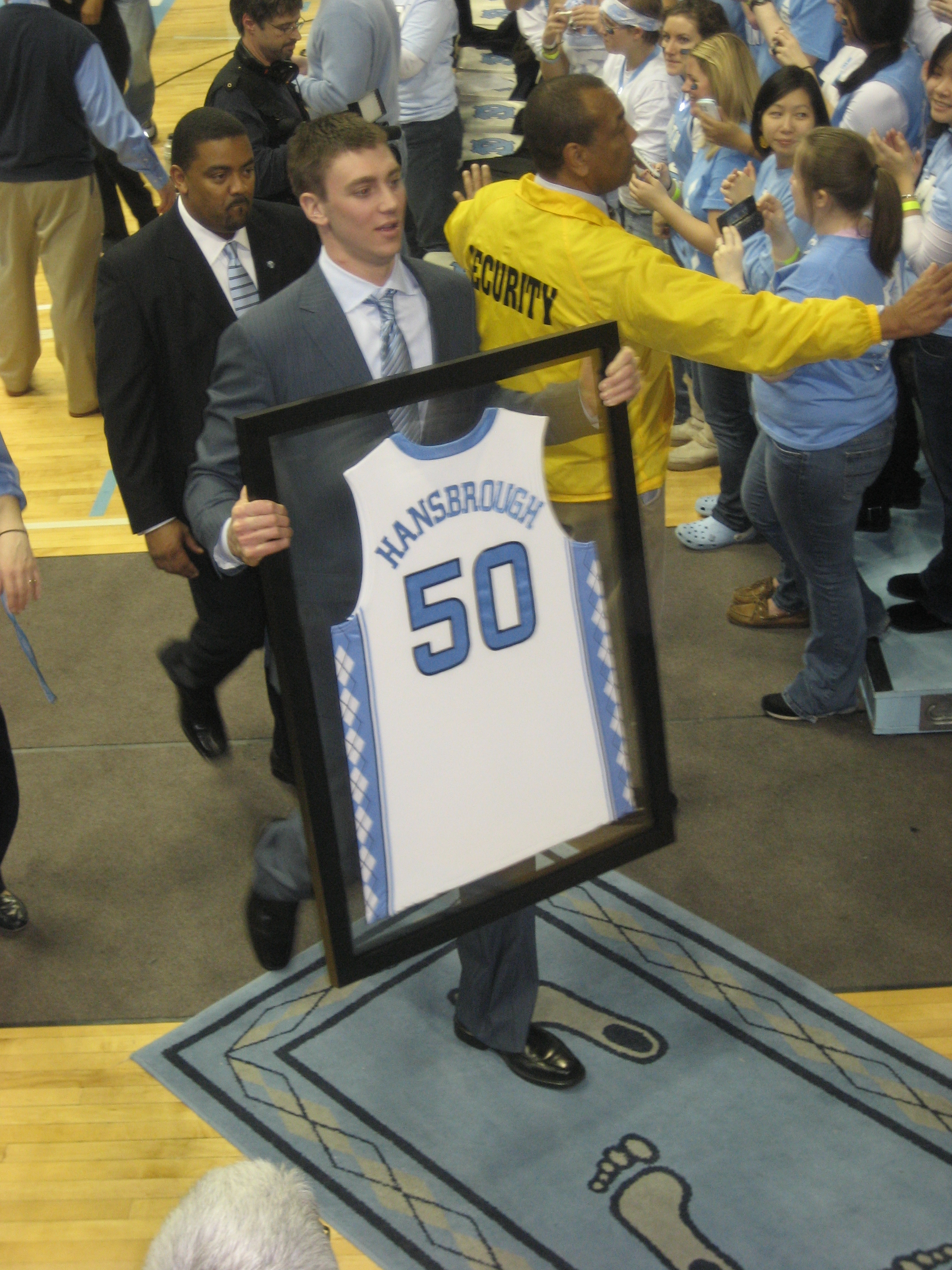
Tyler Hansbrough, North Carolina (2005–2009)

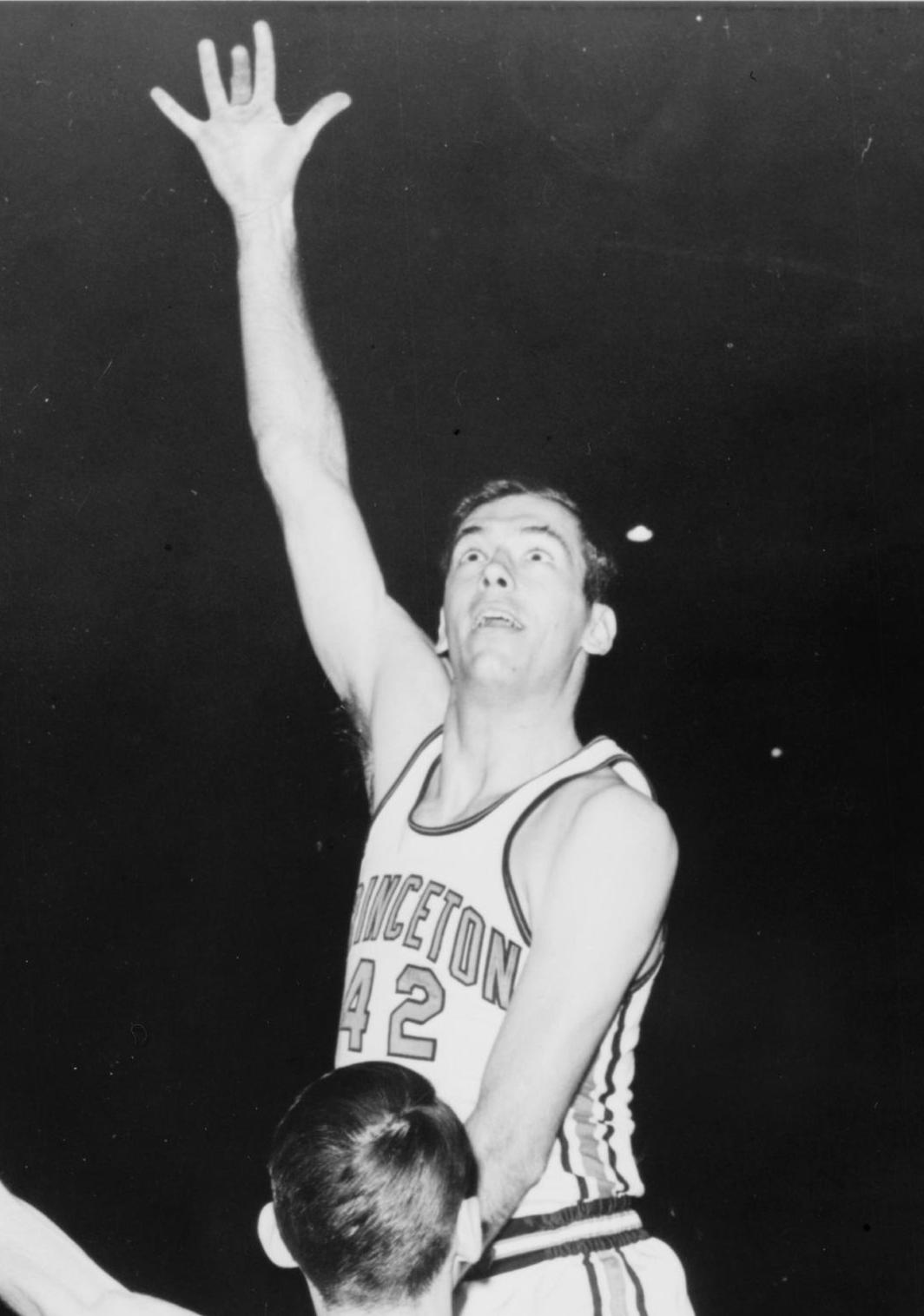
Bill Bradley, Princeton (1962–1965)

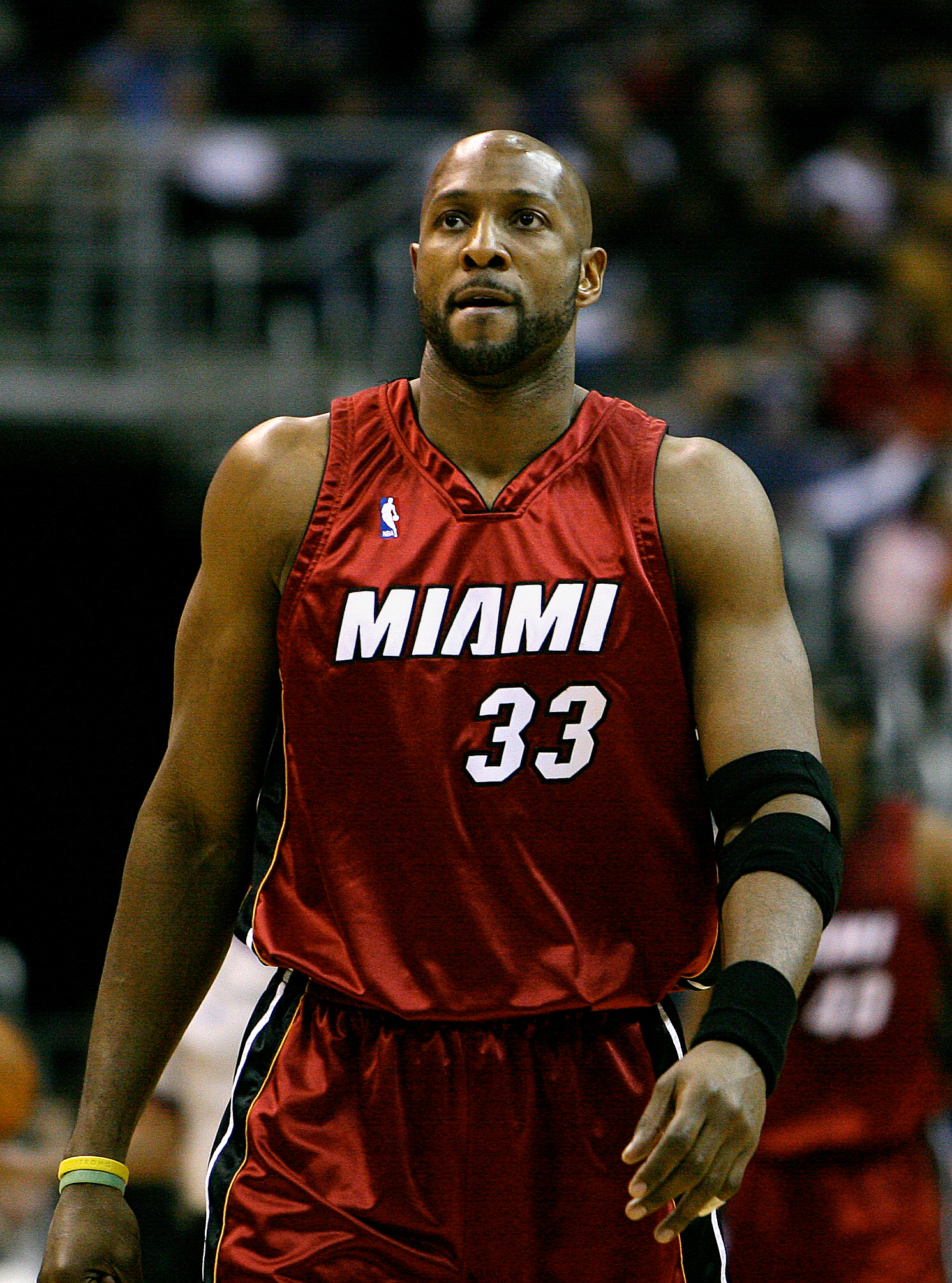
Alonzo Mourning, Georgetown (1988–1992)

All teams are listed under their current athletic brand names, which do not always match those in use when a listed player was active.

Player	Pos.	Team	Games played	Career start	Career end	FTM	FTA	FT%	Ref.
Tyler Hansbrough	F	North Carolina	142	2005	2009	982	1,241	79.1	
Dickie Hemric	C	Wake Forest	104	1951	1955	905	1,359	66.6	
Pete Maravich*	G	LSU	83	1967	1970	893	1,152	77.5	
Oscar Robertson*	G/F	Cincinnati	88	1957	1960	869	1,114	78.0	
Caleb Green	F	Oral Roberts	128	2003	2007	852	1,134	75.1	
Don Schlundt	C	Indiana	94	1951	1955	826	1,076	76.8	
Troy Bell	G	Boston College	122	1999	2003	810	933	86.8	
Bill Bradley*	F/G	Princeton	83	1962	1965	791	903	87.6	
Mike Daum	F	South Dakota State	136	2015	2019	786	927	84.8	
Mark Sears^{C}	G	Ohio / Alabama	169	2020	2025	773	901	85.8	
Alonzo Mourning*	C	Georgetown	120	1988	1992	771	1,003	75.4	
Derrick Chievous	F	Missouri	130	1984	1988	764	963	79.3	
Eddie Benton	G	Vermont	104	1992	1996	739	891	82.9	
Chris Clemons	G	Campbell	130	2015	2019	733	860	85.2	
Stefon Jackson	G	UTEP	125	2005	2009	726	945	76.8	
Tyler Haws	G	BYU	139	2009	2015 (Note: Following Haws' freshman season of 2009–10, he spent two years on a Mormon mission and did not play his sophomore season until 2012–13.)	724	820	88.3	
Joe Dumars*	G	McNeese	116	1981	1985	723	917	78.8	
Malcolm Delaney	G	Virginia Tech	136	2007	2011	721	853	84.5	
Chris Monroe	G	George Washington	118	1999	2003	719	955	75.3	
Joe Holup	F	George Washington (2)	104	1952	1956	714	961	74.3	
Terry Dischinger	G/F	Purdue	70	1959	1962	713	871	81.9	
Christian Laettner	F/C	Duke	148	1988	1992	713	885	80.6	
Steve Rogers	G/F	Middle Tennessee / Alabama State	113	1988	1992	713	955	74.7	
Don MacLean	F/C	UCLA	127	1988	1992	711	827	86.0	
Michael Anderson	G	Drexel	115	1984	1988	705	958	73.6	
