= 2017–18 Purdue Boilermakers men's basketball team =

American college basketball season

2017–18 Purdue Boilermakers men's basketball

Summer Universiade Silver Medalists

NCAA tournament, Sweet Sixteen
- Conference: Big Ten Conference

Ranking
- Coaches: No. 9
- AP: No. 11
- Record: 30–7 (15–3 Big Ten)
- Head coach: Matt Painter (13th season)
- Assistant coaches: Brandon Brantley; Greg Gary; Steve Lutz
- Home arena: Mackey Arena

2017–18 Big Ten Conference men's basketball standings
	Conf.				Overall
Team	W		L	PCT	W		L	PCT
No. 5 Michigan State	16	–	2	.889	30	–	5	.857
No. 11 Purdue	15	–	3	.833	30	–	7	.811
No. 17 Ohio State	15	–	3	.833	25	–	9	.735
No. 7 Michigan †	13	–	5	.722	33	–	8	.805
Nebraska	13	–	5	.722	22	–	11	.667
Penn State	9	–	9	.500	26	–	13	.667
Indiana	9	–	9	.500	16	–	15	.516
Maryland	8	–	10	.444	19	–	13	.594
Wisconsin	7	–	11	.389	15	–	18	.455
Northwestern	6	–	12	.333	15	–	17	.469
Minnesota	4	–	14	.222	15	–	17	.469
Illinois	4	–	14	.222	14	–	18	.438
Iowa	4	–	14	.222	14	–	19	.424
Rutgers	3	–	15	.167	15	–	19	.441
† 2018 Big Ten tournament winner Rankings from AP poll

The 2017–18 Purdue Boilermakers men's basketball team represented Purdue University in the 2017–18 NCAA Division I men's basketball season. Their head coach was Matt Painter, in his 13th season with the Boilers. The team played their home games in Mackey Arena in West Lafayette, Indiana as members of the Big Ten Conference. The Boilermakers finished the season 30–7, 15–3 in Big Ten play to finish in a tie for second place. As the No. 3 seed in the Big Ten tournament, they defeated Rutgers and Penn State before losing to Michigan in the championship game. They received an at-large bid to the NCAA tournament as the No. 2 seed in the East region. They defeated Cal State Fullerton in the First Round, but lost starting center Isaac Haas to a fractured elbow. Without Haas, they defeated Butler in the Second Round to advance to the Sweet Sixteen where they lost to No. 3 seed Texas Tech.

== Previous season ==
The Boilermakers finished the 2016–17 season 27–8, 14–4 to win the Big Ten regular season championship. In the Big Ten tournament, they lost in the finals to Michigan. They received an at-large bid to the NCAA tournament as the No. 4 seed in the Midwest Region where they beat Vermont and Iowa State to advance to the Sweet Sixteen. In their first trip to the Sweet Sixteen since 2010, they lost to No. 1-seeded and No. 3-ranked Kansas.

== Offseason ==
=== Departures ===
Big Ten Player of the Year Caleb Swanigan declared in April for the NBA draft, but did not immediately sign with an agent. Isaac Haas and Vincent Edwards also declared for the draft, but also did not sign with an agent. On May 16, 2017, Haas announced he would withdraw from the NBA draft. On May 24, Edwards announced he would return to school. Also on May 24, Swanigan announced he would stay in the NBA draft and not return to school. On June 22, 2017, Swanigan was drafted in the first round (26th overall) by the Portland Trail Blazers.

Name	Number	Pos.	Height	Weight	Year	Hometown	Notes
Jon McKeeman	2	G	6'1"	190	RS Senior	Fort Wayne, IN	Walk-on; graduated
Caleb Swanigan	50	F	6'9"	250	Sophomore	Fort Wayne, IN	Declared for 2017 NBA draft
Spike Albrecht	55	G	6'0"	180	RS Senior	Crown Point, IN	Completed athletic eligibility; graduated from Michigan in 2016

=== Incoming transfers ===
Name	Number	Pos.	Height	Weight	Year	Hometown	Previous School
Eden Ewing	5	PF	6'7"	215	Junior	Richmond, TX	Junior college transfer from Tyler Junior College.

=== Recruiting classes ===
==== 2017 recruiting class ====
College recruiting
Name	Hometown	School	Height	Weight	Commit date
Aaron Wheeler; SF	Stamford, Connecticut	Brewster Academy	6 ft 8 in (2.03 m)	200 lb (91 kg)	Oct 17, 2016
Aaron Wheeler; SF	Recruit ratings: Scout: Rivals: 247Sports: ESPN: (78)				
Nojel Eastern; PG	Evanston, Illinois	Evanston Township High School	6 ft 6 in (1.98 m)	210 lb (95 kg)	Nov 16, 2016
Nojel Eastern; PG	Recruit ratings: Scout: Rivals: 247Sports: ESPN: (83)				
Sasha Stefanovic; SG	Crown Point, Indiana	Crown Point High School	6 ft 4 in (1.93 m)	195 lb (88 kg)	Feb 3, 2017
Sasha Stefanovic; SG	Recruit ratings: Scout: Rivals: 247Sports: ESPN: (N/A)				
Overall recruit ranking: Rivals: 27
Note: In many cases, Scout, Rivals, 247Sports, On3, and ESPN may conflict in their listings of height and weight.; In these cases, the average was taken. ESPN grades are on a 100-point scale.; Sources: "2017 Purdue Signees". Rivals.; "2017 Purdue Signees". Scout.; "2017 Purdue Signees". ESPN.; "Scout.com Team Recruiting Rankings". Scout.; "2017 Team Ranking". Rivals.

==== 2018 recruiting class ====
College recruiting (2018)
Name	Hometown	School	Height	Weight	Commit date
Trevion Williams; C	Detroit, Michigan	Henry Ford II High School	6 ft 8 in (2.03 m)	250 lb (110 kg)	Jul 6, 2017
Trevion Williams; C	Recruit ratings: Scout: Rivals: 247Sports: ESPN:				
Emmanuel Dowuona; C	Miami, Florida	Westwood Christian School	6 ft 11 in (2.11 m)	220 lb (100 kg)	Sep 19, 2017
Emmanuel Dowuona; C	Recruit ratings: Scout: Rivals: 247Sports: ESPN:				
Eric Hunter; SG	Indianapolis, IN	Charles A. Tindley School	6 ft 3 in (1.91 m)	165 lb (75 kg)	Sep 25, 2017
Eric Hunter; SG	Recruit ratings: Scout: Rivals: 247Sports: ESPN:				
Overall recruit ranking:
Note: In many cases, Scout, Rivals, 247Sports, On3, and ESPN may conflict in their listings of height and weight.; In these cases, the average was taken. ESPN grades are on a 100-point scale.; Sources: "2018 Purdue Commits". Rivals.; "2018 Team Ranking". Rivals.

=== World University Games ===
In August 2017, Purdue represented Team USA as the national team in the World University Games. They played exhibition games against Team Canada before traveling to Taipei to participate in the Games. Each team was guaranteed to play at least eight games throughout the entire World University Games. Purdue went 5–0 in pool play to advance to the medal round. They defeated Team Israel in the quarterfinals and defeated Team Serbia to advance to the Gold Medal Game against Team Lithuania. In the Gold Medal Game, the Boilers were defeated by Team Lithuania 85–74.

== Preseason ==
In its preseason rankings, the Blue Ribbon yearbook ranked Purdue as No. 14 in the country.

== Roster ==
2017–18 Purdue Boilermakers men's basketball team
Players
Coaches

Pos.	#	Name	Height	Weight	Year	Previous school	Hometown
F	1	Aaron Wheeler (redshirt)	6 ft 9 in (2.06 m)	200 lb (91 kg)	Fr	Brewster Academy	Stamford, Connecticut
G	3	Carsen Edwards	6 ft 0 in (1.83 m)	190 lb (86 kg)	So	Atascocita High School	Atascocita, Texas
G	11	P. J. Thompson	5 ft 10 in (1.78 m)	185 lb (84 kg)	Sr	Brebeuf Jesuit Prep	Indianapolis, Indiana
F	12	Vincent Edwards	6 ft 8 in (2.03 m)	225 lb (102 kg)	Sr	Middletown High School	Middletown, Ohio
G	14	Ryan Cline	6 ft 6 in (1.98 m)	195 lb (88 kg)	Jr	Carmel High School	Carmel, Indiana
G	15	Tommy Luce (W)	5 ft 10 in (1.78 m)	150 lb (68 kg)	So	Jeffersonville High School	Jeffersonville, Indiana
G	20	Nojel Eastern	6 ft 6 in (1.98 m)	220 lb (100 kg)	Fr	Evanston Township High School	Evanston, Illinois
F	23	Jacquil Taylor	6 ft 10 in (2.08 m)	240 lb (109 kg)	RS Jr	Beaver Country Day School	Cambridge, Massachusetts
F	24	Grady Eifert (W)	6 ft 6 in (1.98 m)	220 lb (100 kg)	Jr	Bishop Dwenger High School	Fort Wayne, Indiana
G	31	Dakota Mathias	6 ft 4 in (1.93 m)	200 lb (91 kg)	Sr	Elida High School	Elida, Ohio
F	32	Matt Haarms	7 ft 3 in (2.21 m)	250 lb (113 kg)	RS Fr	Sunrise Christian Academy	Amsterdam, the Netherlands
C	44	Isaac Haas (injured)	7 ft 2 in (2.18 m)	290 lb (132 kg)	Sr	Hokes Bluff High School	Hokes Bluff, Alabama
G	55	Sasha Stefanovic (redshirt)	6 ft 4 in (1.93 m)	195 lb (88 kg)	Fr	Crown Point High School	Crown Point, Indiana

Head coach

- Matt Painter (Purdue)

Assistant coach(es)

- Steve Lutz (Texas Lutheran)
- Greg Gary (Tulane)
- Brandon Brantley (Purdue)

Legend

- (C) Team captain
- (S) Suspended
- (I) Ineligible
- (W) Walk-on
- Injured
- Current redshirt

Roster

== Schedule and results ==
The 2018 Big Ten tournament will be held at Madison Square Garden in New York City. Due to the Big East's use of that venue for their conference tournament, the Big Ten tournament will take place one week earlier than usual, ending the week before Selection Sunday. This could result in teams having nearly two weeks off before the NCAA tournament.

Date time, TV	Rank^{#}	Opponent^{#}	Result	Record	High points	High rebounds	High assists	Site (attendance) city, state
World University Games Exhibition
Aug 11, 2017*; 7:00 pm, Facebook Live		vs. Team Canada	W 94–86		20 – Haas	11 – Haas	4 – Mathias	Carmel High School; Carmel, IN
Aug 12, 2017*; 4:00 pm		vs. Team Canada	W 103–91 ^{OT}		25 – Edwards, V.	9 – Haas	4 – Tied	Crawley Athletic Center; Lafayette, IN
World University Games
Aug 20, 2017*; 5:30 am		vs. Team Argentina; Pool play	W 89–76		17 – Edwards, C.	9 – Edwards, V.	4 – Thompson	Taipei Arena (6,589); Taipei, Taiwan
Aug 21, 2017*; 3:00 am		vs. Team United Arab Emirates; Pool play	W 127–53		20 – Cline	11 – Edwards, V.	9 – Eastern	University of Taipei Gymnasium; Taipei, Taiwan
Aug 23, 2017*; 5:30 am		vs. Team Czech Republic; Pool play	W 107–78		22 – Edwards, V.	5 – Tied	3 – Tied	Taipei Arena; Taipei, Taiwan
Aug 24, 2017*; 3:00 am		vs. Team Romania; Pool play	W 120–62		17 – Stefanovic	8 – Tied	3 – Tied	Taipei Arena; Taipei, Taiwan
Aug 25, 2017*; 12:30 am		vs. Team Estonia; Pool play	W 101–61		19 – Edwards, V.	14 – Taylor	7 – Cline	Taipei Arena; Taipei, Taiwan
Aug 27, 2017*; 3:00 am, CBSSN		vs. Team Israel; Quarterfinals	W 111–107 ^{OT}		36 – Edwards, C.	9 – Edwards, V.	6 – Edwards, V.	Taipei Arena; Taipei, Taiwan
Aug 28, 2017*; 12:30 am		vs. Team Serbia; Semifinals	W 93–61		31 – Edwards, V.	5 – Tied	6 – Edwards, C.	Taipei Arena; Taipei, Taiwan
Aug 29, 2017*; 8:00 am		vs. Team Lithuania; Gold Medal Game	L 74–85		23 – Edwards, C.	7 – Taylor	4 – Mathias	Taipei Arena; Taipei, Taiwan
Exhibition
Oct 28, 2017*; 3:00 pm		Indiana State; Hurricane Charity Exhibition	W 94–72		16 – Tied	7 – Edwards, V.	6 – Edwards, V.	Mackey Arena (5,168); West Lafayette, IN
Nov 1, 2017*; 7:00 pm, BTN+	No. 20	Carroll (Montana)	W 98–71		20 – Edwards, V.	7 – Eifert	6 – Mathias	Mackey Arena (12,634); West Lafayette, IN
Regular season
Nov 10, 2017*; 8:00 pm, BTN+	No. 20	SIU Edwardsville	W 105–74	1–0	18 – Mathias	7 – Haas	8 – Eastern	Mackey Arena (13,934); West Lafayette, IN
Nov 12, 2017*; 4:00 pm, BTN	No. 20	Chicago State	W 111–42	2–0	25 – Edwards, C.	12 – Edwards, V.	6 – Mathias	Mackey Arena (13,509); West Lafayette, IN
Nov 14, 2017*; 8:30 pm, FS1	No. 19	at Marquette; Gavitt Tipoff Games	W 86–71	3–0	22 – Haas	8 – V. Edwards	4 – D. Mathias	BMO Harris Bradley Center (13,307); Milwaukee, WI
Nov 18, 2017*; 7:00 pm, BTN+	No. 19	Fairfield	W 106–64	4–0	23 – Mathias	11 – Edwards, V.	6 – Edwards, C.	Mackey Arena (14,804); West Lafayette, IN
Nov 22, 2017*; 12:00 pm, ESPN2	No. 18	vs. Tennessee; Battle 4 Atlantis quarterfinals	L 75–78 ^{OT}	4–1	21 – Edwards, C.	13 – Edwards, V.	5 – Edwards, V.	Imperial Arena (1,306); Nassau, Bahamas
Nov 23, 2017*; 7:00 pm, ESPN3	No. 18	vs. Western Kentucky; Battle 4 Atlantis	L 73–77	4–2	22 – Haas	6 – Tied	7 – Mathias	Imperial Arena; Nassau, Bahamas
Nov 24, 2017*; 9:30 pm, ESPN3	No. 18	vs. No. 2 Arizona; Battle 4 Atlantis 7th place game	W 89–64	5–2	24 – Mathias	8 – Edwards, V.	6 – Mathias	Imperial Arena; Nassau, Bahamas
Nov 28, 2017*; 8:00 pm, ESPN		No. 17 Louisville; ACC–Big Ten Challenge	W 66–57	6–2	15 – Edwards, V.	7 – Edwards, V.	2 – 3 Tied	Mackey Arena (14,804); West Lafayette, IN
Dec 1, 2017; 7:00 pm, BTN		at Maryland	W 80–75	7–2 (1–0)	21 – Haas	11 – Edwards, V.	9 – Mathias	Xfinity Center (17,308); College Park, MD
Dec 3, 2017; 4:00 pm, BTN		Northwestern	W 74–69	8–2 (2–0)	26 – Haas	9 – Haas	5 – Mathias	Mackey Arena (14,360); West Lafayette, IN
Dec 7, 2017*; 6:30 pm, FS1	No. 21	Valparaiso	W 80–50	9–2	15 – Edwards, V.	9 – Edwards, V.	3 – Edwards, V.	Mackey Arena (14,232); West Lafayette, IN
Dec 10, 2017*; 7:00 pm, BTN	No. 21	IUPUI	W 86–61	10–2	27 – Edwards, C.	12 – Edwards, V.	6 – Thompson	Mackey Arena (13,641); West Lafayette, IN
Dec 16, 2017*; 12:00 pm, FOX	No. 17	vs. Butler; Crossroads Classic	W 82–67	11–2	18 – Edwards, C.	6 – Edwards, V.	5 – Mathias	Bankers Life Fieldhouse; Indianapolis, IN
Dec 21, 2017*; 6:00 pm, BTN	No. 16	Tennessee State	W 97–48	12–2	26 – Edwards	6 – Haarms	10 – Mathias	Mackey Arena (12,679); West Lafayette, IN
Dec 30, 2017*; 8:00 pm, BTN	No. 14	Lipscomb	W 98–66	13–2	23 – Edwards, V.	15 – Edwards, V.	4 – Mathias	Mackey Arena (14,804); West Lafayette, IN
Jan 3, 2018; 7:00 pm, BTN	No. 13	Rutgers	W 82–51	14–2 (3–0)	14 – Haas	6 – 3 tied	4 – C. Edwards	Mackey Arena (13,449); West Lafayette, IN
Jan 6, 2018; 2:15 pm, BTN	No. 13	Nebraska	W 74–62	15–2 (4–0)	21 – Edwards V.	10 – Edwards V.	6 – Edwards V.	Mackey Arena (14,804); West Lafayette, IN
Jan 9, 2018; 9:00 pm, ESPN	No. 5-t	at Michigan	W 70–69	16–2 (5–0)	19 – C. Edwards	6 – Haas	5 – V. Edwards	Crisler Arena (10,164); Ann Arbor, MI
Jan 13, 2018; 12:00 pm, ESPN2	No. 5-t	at Minnesota	W 81–47	17–2 (6–0)	25 – V. Edwards	10 – Eastern	7 – C. Edwards	Williams Arena (12,459); Minneapolis, MN
Jan 16, 2018; 7:00 pm, ESPN	No. 3	Wisconsin	W 78–50	18–2 (7–0)	21 – C. Edwards	5 – V. Edwards	5 – Mathias	Mackey Arena (14,804); West Lafayette, IN
Jan 20, 2018; 12:00 pm, ESPN	No. 3	at Iowa	W 87–64	19–2 (8–0)	22 – C. Edwards	5 – Mathias	8 – C. Edwards	Carver–Hawkeye Arena (14,822); Iowa City, IA
Jan 25, 2018; 7:00 pm, ESPN2	No. 3	No. 25 Michigan	W 92–88	20–2 (9–0)	30 – V. Edwards	6 – Haas	5 – V. Edwards	Mackey Arena (14,804); West Lafayette, IN
Jan 28, 2018; 3:30 pm, FOX	No. 3	at Indiana; Rivalry/Crimson and Gold Cup	W 74–67	21–2 (10–0)	26 – Haas	7 – V. Edwards	5 – Mathias	Simon Skjodt Assembly Hall (17,222); Bloomington, IN
Jan 31, 2018; 8:30 pm, BTN	No. 3	Maryland	W 75–67	22–2 (11–0)	20 – Haas	11 – V. Edwards	5 – V. Edwards	Mackey Arena (14,804); West Lafayette, IN
Feb 3, 2018; 4:00 pm, BTN	No. 3	at Rutgers	W 78–76	23–2 (12–0)	18 – V. Edwards	8 – V. Edwards	7 – V. Edwards	Louis Brown Athletic Center (8,318); Piscataway, NJ
Feb 7, 2018; 8:30 pm, BTN	No. 3	No. 14 Ohio State	L 63–64	23–3 (12–1)	28 – C. Edwards	9 – V. Edwards	4 – Mathias	Mackey Arena (14,804); West Lafayette, IN
Feb 10, 2018; 4:00 pm, ESPN	No. 3	at No. 4 Michigan State	L 65–68	23–4 (12–2)	25 – Haas	7 – V. Edwards	6 – 2 tied	Breslin Center (14,797); East Lansing, MI
Feb 15, 2018; 7:00 pm, ESPN	No. 6	at Wisconsin	L 53–57	23–5 (12–3)	22 – C. Edwards	11 – Haas	3 – C. Edwards	Kohl Center (17,287); Madison, WI
Feb 18, 2018; 8:00 pm, BTN	No. 6	Penn State	W 76–73	24–5 (13–3)	27 – C. Edwards	6 – Haas	3 – Tied	Mackey Arena (14,804); West Lafayette, IN
Feb 22, 2018; 6:00 pm, FS1	No. 9	at Illinois	W 93–86	25–5 (14–3)	40 – C. Edwards	8 – Mathias	4 – Cline	State Farm Center (14,673); Champaign, IL
Feb 25, 2018; 4:00 pm, FS1	No. 9	Minnesota	W 84–60	26–5 (15–3)	25 – Mathias	7 – Mathias	7 – C. Edwards	Mackey Arena (14,804); West Lafayette, IN
Big Ten tournament
Mar 2, 2018; 9:00 pm, BTN	(3) No. 8	vs. (14) Rutgers; Quarterfinals	W 82–75	27–5	26 – Tied	10 – Haas	7 – Mathias	Madison Square Garden (19,812); New York City, NY
Mar 3, 2018; 4:30 pm, CBS	(3) No. 8	vs. (7) Penn State; Semifinals	W 78–70	28–5	27 – C. Edwards	7 – Haas	5 – V. Edwards	Madison Square Garden (19,812); New York City, NY
Mar 4, 2018; 4:30 pm, CBS	(3) No. 8	vs. (5) No. 15 Michigan; Championship	L 66–75	28–6	23 – Haas	8 – Tied	2 – Tied	Madison Square Garden (19,812); New York City, NY
NCAA tournament
Mar 16, 2018*; 12:40 pm, truTV	(2 E) No. 11	vs. (15 E) Cal State Fullerton; First Round	W 74–48	29–6	15 – Tied	10 – Haas	3 – Haarms	Little Caesars Arena (20,163); Detroit, MI
Mar 18, 2018*; 12:10 pm, CBS	(2 E) No. 11	vs. (10 E) Butler; Second Round	W 76–73	30–6	20 – V. Edwards	6 – Haarms	4 – Mathias	Little Caesars Arena (20,360); Detroit, MI
Mar 23, 2018*; 10:07 pm, TBS	(2 E) No. 11	vs. (3 E) No. 14 Texas Tech; Sweet Sixteen	L 65–78	30–7	30 – C. Edwards	13 – V. Edwards	4 – Thompson	TD Garden (19,059); Boston, MA
*Non-conference game. ^{#}Rankings from AP Poll. (#) Tournament seedings in parentheses. All times are in Eastern Time.

== Rankings ==
Ranking movements Legend: ██ Increase in ranking ██ Decrease in ranking RV = Received votes ( ) = First-place votes
	Week																			
Poll	Pre	1	2	3	4	5	6	7	8	9	10	11	12	13	14	15	16	17	18	Final
AP	20	19	18	RV	21	17	16	14	13	5	3 (1)	3 (1)	3 (1)	3 (1)	6	9	8	10	11	Not released
Coaches	21	21^	16	RV	21	17	16	13	12	7	3 (1)	3 (1)	3 (1)	3 (1)	7	9	8	10	11	9

^Coaches Poll did not release a Week 2 poll at the same time AP did.
*AP does not release post-NCAA tournament rankings
