= Rainbow City, Alabama =

City in Alabama, United States

- City
- City of Rainbow City
- Flag Logo

- Location of Rainbow City in Etowah County, Alabama
- Coordinates: 33°56′38″N 86°3′42″W
- Country: United States
- State: Alabama
- County: Etowah

Area
  - Total: 25.92 sq mi (67.13 km^{2})
  - Land: 25.58 sq mi (66.25 km^{2})
  - Water: 0.34 sq mi (0.88 km^{2})
- Elevation: 518 ft (158 m)

Population (2020)
  - Total: 10,191
  - Density: 398.4/sq mi (153.83/km^{2})
- Time zone: UTC-6 (Central (CST))
  - Summer (DST): UTC-5 (CDT)
- ZIP codes: 35901, 35906
- Area code: 256
- FIPS code: 01-63288
- GNIS feature ID: 2404588
- Website: www.rbcalabama.com

Rainbow City is a city in Etowah County, Alabama, United States. It incorporated in 1950. As of the 2020 census, Rainbow City had a population of 10,191. It is part of the Gadsden Metropolitan Statistical Area.

== History ==
This city was named after U.S. Highway 411, called Rainbow Drive, which runs through the middle of the city.

Hernando de Soto's troops were the first visitors to the area in 1540. In 1818, families from the Carolinas and Georgia began to migrate to the area and homestead land near the Coosa River, calling the area "Coosa Bend". This area was later called "Morgan's Cross Road", located at the intersection of the Gadsden-Ashville Road and Gilbert's Ferry Road.

John Sheffield Jones, the grandson of an original settler, donated $1,000 and the land for the construction of the first John S. Jones Elementary School. This school later burned to the ground; a new elementary school was built and serves the Rainbow City area today.

On April 2, 1831, a church was organized at the Harmony Meeting House. A few years later, the first Baptist association was organized. Harmony was one of the first five members in the association. The adjoining cemetery, Old Harmony Cemetery, has been declared a historic landmark.

== Education ==
The city is served by the Etowah County Schools. The city has one public elementary school, and shares a middle and high school with neighboring Southside. There is also a private school for the city.

John S. Jones is one of several elementary schools in the area. It houses grades K-5.

=== Southside High School ===
Southside is the shared high school for the area of Southside and Rainbow City. It houses grades 9–12.

=== Westbrook Christian School ===
Westbrook is a private school that houses grades PreK-12.

== Geography ==
Rainbow City is located in southern Etowah County. It is bordered to the northeast by Gadsden, the county seat, to the southeast by the Coosa River, across which is the city of Southside, and to the southwest, across Little Canoe Creek, by the town of Steele in St. Clair County.

U.S. Route 411 (Rainbow Drive) is the main road through the city, leading northeast 6 miles (10 km) to the center of Gadsden and southwest 15 miles (24 km) to Ashville. Alabama State Route 77 (Grand Avenue) crosses US 411 in the center of Rainbow City, leading northwest 4 miles (6 km) to Interstate 59 at Exit 181 and south 26 miles (42 km) to Lincoln.

According to the U.S. Census Bureau, Rainbow City has a total area of 25.6 square miles (66.3 km^{2}), of which 25.4 square miles (65.9 km^{2}) is land and 0.15 square miles (0.4 km^{2}), or 0.58%, is water.

== Demographics ==
Historical population
Census	Pop.	Note	%±
1960	1,625		—
1970	3,107		91.2%
1980	6,299		102.7%
1990	7,673		21.8%
2000	8,428		9.8%
2010	9,602		13.9%
2020	10,191		6.1%
U.S. Decennial Census

=== 2020 census ===
As of the 2020 census, Rainbow City had a population of 10,191. The median age was 42.1 years. 22.0% of residents were under the age of 18 and 21.6% of residents were 65 years of age or older. For every 100 females there were 90.2 males, and for every 100 females age 18 and over there were 88.3 males age 18 and over.

68.4% of residents lived in urban areas, while 31.6% lived in rural areas.

There were 4,300 households and 2,508 families in Rainbow City. Of all households, 30.1% had children under the age of 18 living in them. Of all households, 46.9% were married-couple households, 17.5% were households with a male householder and no spouse or partner present, and 30.8% were households with a female householder and no spouse or partner present. About 30.6% of all households were made up of individuals and 14.8% had someone living alone who was 65 years of age or older.

There were 4,700 housing units, of which 8.5% were vacant. The homeowner vacancy rate was 1.5% and the rental vacancy rate was 7.2%.

Rainbow City racial composition
Race	Num.	Perc.
White (non-Hispanic)	7,984	78.34%
Black or African American (non-Hispanic)	1,113	10.92%
Native American	24	0.24%
Asian	323	3.17%
Pacific Islander	7	0.07%
Other/mixed	458	4.49%
Hispanic or Latino	282	2.77%

=== 2010 census ===
As of the census of 2010, there were 9,602 people, 4,113 households, and 2,721 families residing in the city. The population density was 333.1 inhabitants per square mile (128.6/km^{2}). There were 4,534 housing units at an average density of 179.2 per square mile (69.2/km^{2}). The racial makeup of the city was 87.4% White, 7.2% Black or African American, 0.4% Native American, 2.6% Asian, 1.0% from other races, and 1.4% from two or more races. 2.4% of the population were Hispanic or Latino of any race.

There were 4,113 households, out of which 27.9% had children under the age of 18 living with them, 49.1% were married couples living together, 13.3% had a female householder with no husband present, and 33.8% were non-families. 29.9% of all households were made up of individuals, and 12.3% had someone living alone who was 65 years of age or older. The average household size was 2.33 and the average family size was 2.88.

In the city, the population was spread out, with 22.9% under the age of 18, 8.5% from 18 to 24, 24.8% from 25 to 44, 27.0% from 45 to 64, and 16.8% who were 65 years of age or older. The median age was 40.5 years. For every 100 females, there were 90.3 males. For every 100 females age 18 and over, there were 90.0 males.

The median income for a household in the city was $40,236, and the median income for a family was $60,000. Males had a median income of $45,593 versus $32,421 for females. The per capita income for the city was $23,422. About 10.5% of families and 12.6% of the population were below the poverty line, including 21.1% of those under age 18 and 7.8% of those age 65 or over.

=== 2000 census ===
As of the census of 2000, there were 8,428 people, 3,586 households, and 2,517 families residing in the city. The population density was 335.3 inhabitants per square mile (129.5/km^{2}). There were 3,824 housing units at an average density of 152.1 per square mile (58.7/km^{2}). The racial makeup of the city was 93.09% White, 3.51% Black or African American, 0.34% Native American, 1.45% Asian, 0.51% from other races, and 1.09% from two or more races. 1.45% of the population were Hispanic or Latino of any race.

There were 3,586 households, out of which 30.6% had children under the age of 18 living with them, 56.9% were married couples living together, 11.0% had a female householder with no husband present, and 29.8% were non-families. 27.0% of all households were made up of individuals, and 10.6% had someone living alone who was 65 years of age or older. The average household size was 2.35 and the average family size was 2.84.

In the city, the population was spread out, with 23.0% under the age of 18, 8.0% from 18 to 24, 28.8% from 25 to 44, 25.7% from 45 to 64, and 14.6% who were 65 years of age or older. The median age was 39 years. For every 100 females, there were 89.9 males. For every 100 females age 18 and over, there were 87.2 males.

The median income for a household in the city was $40,216, and the median income for a family was $50,844. Males had a median income of $38,278 versus $26,483 for females. The per capita income for the city was $20,860. About 6.9% of families and 8.4% of the population were below the poverty line, including 9.7% of those under age 18 and 7.5% of those age 65 or over.

== Politics and government ==
The current mayor of Rainbow City is Joe Taylor, who was first elected in 2020. The Current City Council consists of Jerry Ramsey, Randy Vice, Clark Hopper, Jeff Prince, and Jameson Jenkins.

== Transportation ==
Etowah County Rural Transportation provides dial-a-ride bus service throughout the city and county.

== Notable people ==
- Brodie Croyle, former Alabama quarterback and retired NFL player
- Patrick Nix, former Auburn quarterback and current high school football coach in Pinson Valley
