= Matt Haarms =

Dutch basketball player (born 1997)

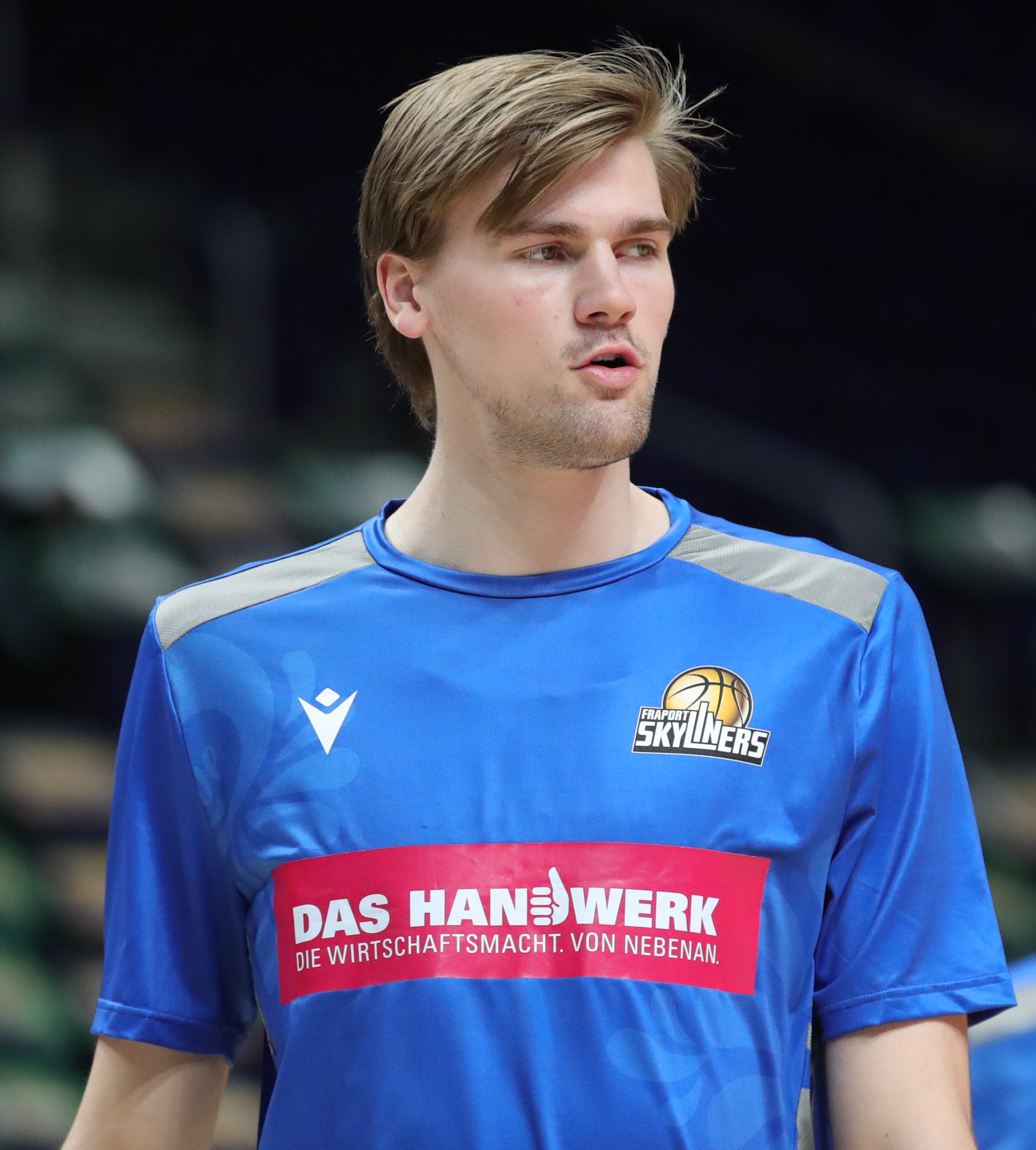
- Haarms in 2023

No. 3 – Kagoshima Rebnise
- Position: Center
- League: B.League

Personal information
- Born: 22 April 1997 (age 29) Amsterdam, Netherlands
- Listed height: 7 ft 3 in (2.21 m)
- Listed weight: 250 lb (113 kg)

Career information
- High school: Sunrise Christian Academy (Bel Aire, Kansas)
- College: Purdue (2017–2020); BYU (2020–2021)
- NBA draft: 2021: undrafted
- Playing career: 2021–present

Career history
- 2021–2023: Skyliners Frankfurt
- 2023–2024: CD Zunder Palencia
- 2024–present: Kagoshima Rebnise

Career highlights
- Second-team All-WCC (2021); WCC Defensive Player of the Year (2021)

Matt Haarms (born 22 April 1997) is a Dutch professional basketball player for Kagoshima Rebnise of the B.League. He played college basketball for the Purdue Boilermakers and the BYU Cougars. Haarms also plays for the Netherlands men's national basketball team.

== Early life ==
Haarms is the son of Martine van Hoorn and Peter Haarms. He was born and grew up in Amsterdam. He initially played soccer and judo before taking up basketball. Haarms purchased an outdoor hoop at the age of 14 so he could practice more. Haarms joined a club team, the Harlemlakers, and admittedly was very poor at first but soon developed into one of the top talents in the country. Haarms then moved to Spain and played for Joventut Badalona's junior team. He helped the team reach the championship game of the tournament and hit 5-of-7 three-point shots in the semifinal against Real Madrid. He was offered a professional contract in Spain but declined the invitation. Instead, Haarms moved to the United States to complete a postgraduate year at Sunrise Christian Academy in Bel Aire, Kansas. He started to receive collegiate attention when he joined the Chauncey Billups AAU Elite team. Haarms committed to playing college basketball for Purdue over offers from Colorado, Vanderbilt and Washington State, becoming the Boilermakers' sixth international player since 1952. He chose Purdue because he liked coach Matt Painter and the program's record of developing big men.

== College career ==
=== Purdue ===
Haarms enrolled at Purdue a semester early and redshirted the second half of the 2016–17 season because the NCAA ruled he would have lost a season of eligibility had he stayed at Sunrise Christian. As a redshirt freshman he averaged 4.8 points, 3.2 rebounds and 2.1 blocks per game in 37 games. His 79 blocked shots were the second-most by a Purdue freshman. Haarms started against Butler and Texas Tech in the NCAA Tournament after Isaac Haas injured his elbow and had a combined 11 points and nine rebounds in the two games. He averaged 9.4 points, 5.4 rebounds, 1.1 assists and 2.1 blocks per game as a redshirt sophomore. On 19 February 2019 Haarms hit a last-second shot to defeat Indiana after being taunted by Indiana fans all game. Haarms suffered a head injury in a loss to Nebraska on 15 December, and missed the following game against Ohio. On 2 January 2020 Haarms scored a career-high 26 points on 11-of-16 shooting in a double-overtime win against Minnesota. He became the second player in Big Ten history, and first since 2007, to lead the league in field goal percentage and blocked shots in the same season. He suffered a hip injury in a double-overtime loss to Michigan on 9 January. As a junior, Haarms averaged 8.6 points, 4.6 rebounds, and 2 blocks per game. Following the season, he transferred from Purdue. After his last season at Purdue, he was named to the 2021 Kareem Abdul-Jabbar award watch list.

=== BYU ===
On 23 April 2020 Haarms announced that he would transfer to BYU over offers from Kentucky and Texas Tech, gaining immediate eligibility as a graduate transfer. He averaged 11.3 points, 5 rebounds, and 2 blocks per game. Haarms was named the West Coast Conference Defensive Player of the Year and was selected to the All-WCC second team. Following the season, he declared for the 2021 NBA draft, forgoing the additional season of eligibility the NCAA granted due to the COVID-19 pandemic.

== Professional career ==
On 13 July 2021, Haarms signed his first professional contract with German club Skyliners Frankfurt of the Basketball Bundesliga. He signed a two-year contract.

On 20 June 2024 Haarms signed with Kagoshima Rebnise of the B.League.

== National team career ==
Haarms competed for the Netherlands under-19 team at the 2015 FIBA Europe Under-18 Championship Division B in Austria and averaged 4.5 points and 3.5 rebounds per game.

Haarms was selected for the Netherlands senior team for the first time in November 2021. On 26 November 2021 Haarms made his debut in a loss against Iceland. He played at EuroBasket 2022, coming off the bench and averaging 3.3 points and 3.8 rebounds as a back-up center.

== Career statistics ==
Legend
GP	Games played	GS	Games started	MPG	Minutes per game
FG%	Field goal percentage	3P%	3-point field goal percentage	FT%	Free throw percentage
RPG	Rebounds per game	APG	Assists per game	SPG	Steals per game
BPG	Blocks per game	PPG	Points per game	**Bold**	Career high

=== College ===
Year	Team	GP	GS	MPG	FG%	3P%	FT%	RPG	APG	SPG	BPG	PPG
2016–17	Purdue	Redshirt										
2017–18	Purdue	**37**	2	17.1	.585	.143	.542	3.2	.6	**.3**	**2.1**	4.8
2018–19	Purdue	36	23	22.8	**.632**	.280	.695	**5.4**	**1.1**	.2	**2.1**	9.4
2019–20	Purdue	29	15	20.5	.524	**.313**	.634	4.6	.9	.2	2.0	8.6
2020–21	BYU	25	**24**	**23.0**	.546	.194	**.803**	5.0	**1.1**	.2	2.0	**11.3**
Career		127	64	20.7	.572	.253	.674	4.5	.9	.2	2.0	8.2
