= Southside, Alabama =

City in Alabama, United States

Southside
- City
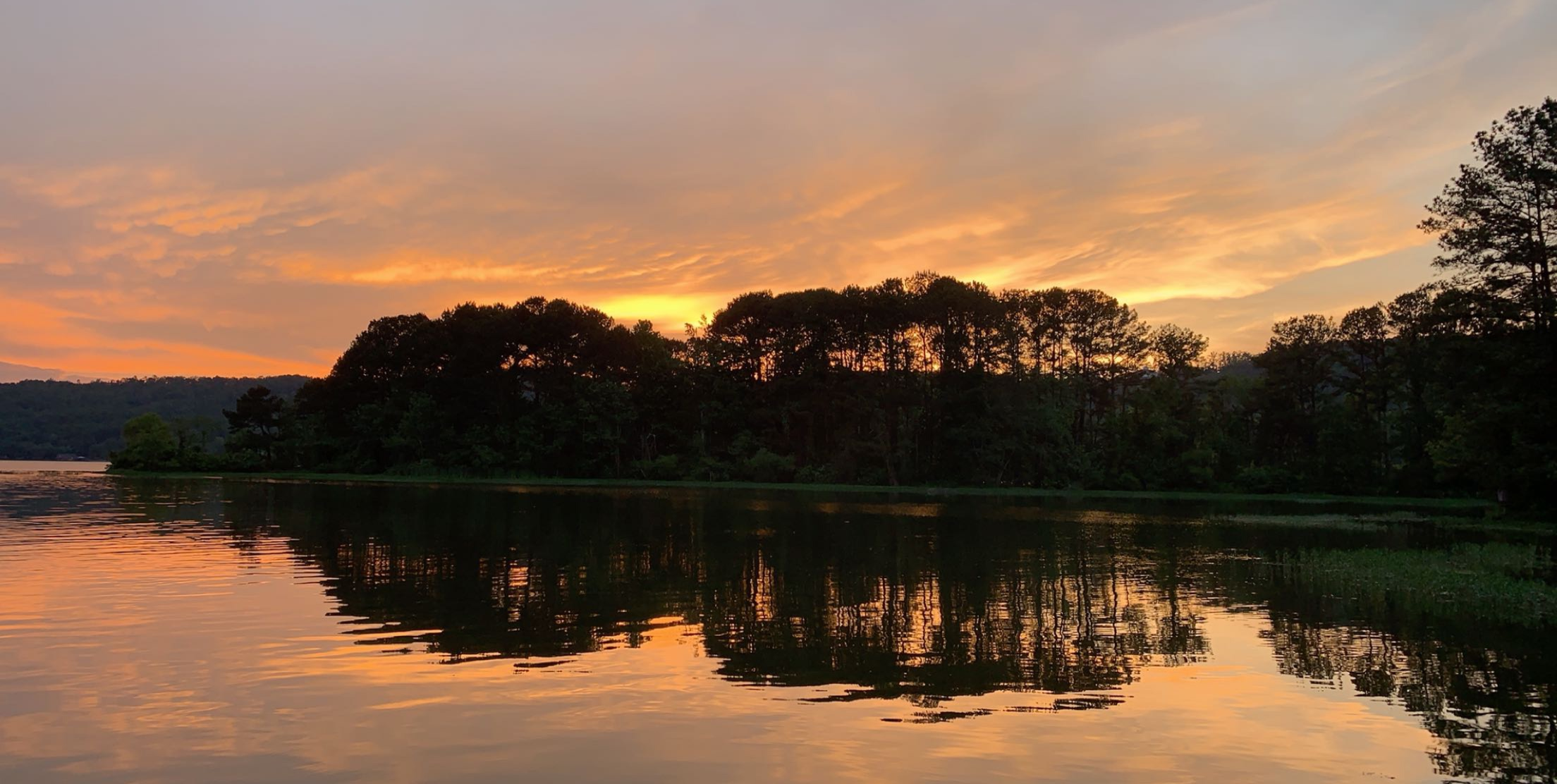
- Sunset over the Coosa River in Southside
- Mottoes: Rich in Hospitality and Genuine Southern Character, The Loveliest Village on the Coosa
- Location within Alabama Location within the United States
- Coordinates: 33°54′02″N 86°01′20″W
- Country: United States
- State: Alabama
- Counties: Etowah

Government
  - Type: Mayor-Council

Area
  - Total: 19.27 sq mi (49.92 km^{2})
  - Land: 19.11 sq mi (49.49 km^{2})
  - Water: 0.17 sq mi (0.43 km^{2})
- Elevation: 545 ft (166 m)

Population (2020)
  - Total: 9,426
  - Density: 493.3/sq mi (190.45/km^{2})
- Time zone: UTC-6 (Central (CST))
  - Summer (DST): UTC-5 (CDT)
- ZIP code: 35907
- Area code: 256
- FIPS code: 01-71832
- GNIS feature ID: 2405499
- Website: www.cityofsouthside.com

Southside is a city located in Etowah County in the U.S. state of Alabama. It is included in the Gadsden Metropolitan Statistical Area. It incorporated in 1957. As of the 2020 census, Southside had a population of 9,426. It is located 8 to 12 miles (13 to 19 km) south of downtown Gadsden.

== History ==
Southside was first settled in 1850 as a small rural community with townships such as Green Valley, Cedar Bend, and Pilgrims Rest, and the area which is now the city of Southside was formed when they merged. Early Southside's primary source of income was agricultural. Green Valley was the early center of Southside's industry; as its grist mill, blacksmith and sorghum mill were located there. The area's cotton gin was located at Brannon Springs and State Highway 77.

== Geography ==
Southside is located in southern Etowah County on the south side of the Coosa River. A small part of the city extends south into Calhoun County. The city is in the foothills of the southern Appalachian Mountains.

According to the U.S. Census Bureau, the city has a total area of 19.2 square miles (49.6 km^{2}), of which 19.0 square miles (49.2 km^{2}) is land and 0.15 square miles (0.4 km^{2}), or 0.87%, is water.

== Demographics ==
Historical population
Census	Pop.	Note	%±
1960	436		—
1970	983		125.5%
1980	5,141		423.0%
1990	5,580		8.5%
2000	7,036		26.1%
2010	8,412		19.6%
2020	9,426		12.1%
U.S. Decennial Census; 2013 Estimate

=== 2020 census ===
As of the 2020 census, Southside had a population of 9,426. The median age was 43.5 years. 21.6% of residents were under the age of 18 and 20.1% were 65 years of age or older. For every 100 females, there were 96.7 males, and for every 100 females age 18 and over, there were 90.3 males.

71.5% of residents lived in urban areas, while 28.5% lived in rural areas.

Southside racial composition
Race	Num.	Perc.
White (non-Hispanic)	8,525	90.44%
Black or African American (non-Hispanic)	221	2.34%
Native American	30	0.32%
Asian	74	0.79%
Other/Mixed	371	3.94%
Hispanic or Latino	205	2.17%

There were 3,686 households and 2,314 families in Southside, of which 31.4% had children under the age of 18 living in them. Of all households, 62.9% were married-couple households, 12.6% were households with a male householder and no spouse or partner present, and 21.0% were households with a female householder and no spouse or partner present. About 21.0% of all households were made up of individuals, and 10.2% had someone living alone who was 65 years of age or older.

There were 3,891 housing units, of which 5.3% were vacant. The homeowner vacancy rate was 1.1% and the rental vacancy rate was 6.7%.

=== 2010 census ===
As of the 2010 United States census, there were 8,412 people, 3,228 households, and 2,524 families residing in the city. The population density was 440.4 inhabitants per square mile (170.0/km^{2}). There were 3,500 housing units at an average density of 183.2 per square mile (70.7/km^{2}). The racial makeup of the city was 96.54% White, 1.46% Black or African American, 0.18% Native American, 0.67% Asian, 0.4% from other races, and 0.71% from two or more races. 1.27% of the population were Hispanic or Latino of any race.

There were 3,228 households, out of which 35.9% had children under the age of 18 living with them, 65.86% were married couples living together, 9.08% had a female householder with no husband present, and 21.81% were non-families. 19.39% of all households were made up of individuals, and 7.93% had someone living alone who was 65 years of age or older. The average household size was 2.58 and the average family size was 2.94.

Age distribution was 26.9% 19 years or younger, 4.5% from 20 to 24, 23% from 25 to 39, 36.7% from 45 to 64, and 13.4% who were 65 years of age or older. The median age was 40.1 years. For every 100 females, there were 96.03 males. For every 100 females age 18 and over, there were 93.34 males.

=== 2000 census ===
As of the 2000 United States census, the median income for a household in the city was $52,464, and the median income for a family was $58,427. Males had a median income of $41,664 versus $29,375 for females. The per capita income for the city was $21,936. About 2.2% of families and 3.6% of the population were below the poverty line, including 3.1% of those under age 18 and 5.4% of those age 65 or over.

== Education ==
The city is served by the Etowah County Schools. The city has one elementary school, one high school, and shares a middle school with neighboring Rainbow City. Students also have the option of attending schools in the Gadsden City Schools.
