= 2016–17 Purdue Boilermakers men's basketball team =

American college basketball season

2016–17 Purdue Boilermakers men's basketball

Big Ten regular season champions Cancún Challenge champions

NCAA tournament, Sweet Sixteen
- Conference: Big Ten Conference

Ranking
- Coaches: No. 15
- AP: No. 15
- Record: 27–8 (14–4 Big Ten)
- Head coach: Matt Painter (12th season)
- Assistant coaches: Jack Owens; Brandon Brantley; Greg Gary
- Captain: Spike Albrecht
- Home arena: Mackey Arena

2016–17 Big Ten Conference men's basketball standings
	Conf.				Overall
Team	W		L	PCT	W		L	PCT
No. 15 Purdue	14	–	4	.778	27	–	8	.771
No. 25 Wisconsin	12	–	6	.667	27	–	10	.730
Maryland	12	–	6	.667	24	–	9	.727
Minnesota	11	–	7	.611	24	–	10	.706
No. 23 Michigan †	10	–	8	.556	26	–	12	.684
Northwestern	10	–	8	.556	24	–	12	.667
Michigan State	10	–	8	.556	20	–	15	.571
Iowa	10	–	8	.556	19	–	15	.559
Illinois	8	–	10	.444	20	–	15	.571
Ohio State	7	–	11	.389	17	–	15	.531
Indiana	7	–	11	.389	18	–	16	.529
Penn State	6	–	12	.333	15	–	18	.455
Nebraska	6	–	12	.333	12	–	19	.387
Rutgers	3	–	15	.167	15	–	18	.455
† 2017 Big Ten tournament winner Rankings from AP poll

The 2016–17 Purdue Boilermakers men's basketball team represented Purdue University in the 2016–17 NCAA Division I men's basketball season. Their head coach was Matt Painter, in his 12th season with the Boilers. The team played their home games in Mackey Arena in West Lafayette, Indiana and were members of the Big Ten Conference. With their win over Indiana on February 28, 2017, Purdue clinched their first Big Ten Championship since 2009, 22nd overall. With Wisconsin's loss on March 2, Purdue clinched an outright championship, their 23rd championship, the most in Big Ten history. They finished the season 27–8, 14–4 in to win the Big Ten regular season championship. In the Big Ten tournament, they lost in the quarterfinals to Michigan. They received an at-large bid to the NCAA tournament as the No. 4 seed in the Midwest Region where they beat Vermont and Iowa State to advance to the Sweet Sixteen. In their first trip to the Sweet Sixteen since 2010, they lost to No. 1-seeded and No. 3-ranked Kansas.

== Previous season ==
The Boilermakers finished the 2015–16 season with a record of 26–9, 12–6 in Big Ten play to finish in a four-way tie for third place. As the No. 4 seed in the Big Ten tournament, they defeated Illinois and Michigan to advance to the championship game. In the championship game, they lost to Michigan State. The Boilermakers received an at-large bid to the NCAA tournament where, as a No. 5 seed, they were upset by No. 12-seeded Little Rock in the first round.

== Preseason ==
Purdue was picked to finish second in the Big Ten in preseason polls by Sports Illustrated and USA Today. Caleb Swanigan was named to the preseason All-Big Ten team as voted by a panel of conference media.

== Offseason ==
=== Departures ===
Name	Number	Pos.	Height	Weight	Year	Hometown	Notes
Johnny Hill	1	G	6'3"	180	RS Senior	Glendale Heights, IL	Graduated
Stephen Toyra	11	G	6'3"	180	Senior	Lafayette, IN	Walk-on; graduated
A. J. Hammons	20	C	7'0"	261	Senior	Carmel, IN	Graduated/2016 NBA draft
Kendall Stephens	21	G	6'6"	197	Junior	St. Charles, IL	Transferred to Nevada
Grant Weatherford	22	G	6'2"	215	Freshman	Cicero, IN	Transferred to Midland College
Raphael Davis	35	G	6'5"	217	Senior	Fort Wayne, IN	Graduated

=== Incoming transfers ===
Name	Number	Pos.	Height	Weight	Year	Hometown	Previous School
Spike Albrecht	55	G	5'11"	175	RS Senior	Crown Point, IN	Transferred from Michigan. Will be eligible to play immediately since Albrecht graduated from Michigan.

== Roster ==
2016–17 Purdue Boilermakers men's basketball team
Players
Coaches

Pos.	#	Name	Height	Weight	Year	Previous school	Hometown
G	2	Jon McKeeman (W)	6 ft 1 in (1.85 m)	190 lb (86 kg)	RS Sr	Carroll High School (IN)	Fort Wayne, Indiana
G	3	Carsen Edwards	6 ft 0 in (1.83 m)	190 lb (86 kg)	Fr	Atascocita High School	Atascocita, Texas
G	11	P. J. Thompson	5 ft 10 in (1.78 m)	185 lb (84 kg)	Jr	Brebeuf Jesuit Prep	Indianapolis, Indiana
F	12	Vincent Edwards	6 ft 8 in (2.03 m)	225 lb (102 kg)	Jr	Middletown High School (OH)	Middletown, Ohio
G	14	Ryan Cline	6 ft 6 in (1.98 m)	195 lb (88 kg)	So	Carmel High School (IN)	Carmel, Indiana
G	15	Tommy Luce (W)	5 ft 10 in (1.78 m)	150 lb (68 kg)	Fr	Jeffersonville High School	Jeffersonville, Indiana
F	23	Jacquil Taylor	6 ft 10 in (2.08 m)	240 lb (109 kg)	RS So	Beaver Country Day School	Cambridge, Massachusetts
F	24	Grady Eifert (W)	6 ft 6 in (1.98 m)	220 lb (100 kg)	So	Bishop Dwenger High School	Fort Wayne, Indiana
G	31	Dakota Mathias	6 ft 4 in (1.93 m)	200 lb (91 kg)	Jr	Elida High School	Elida, Ohio
F	32	Matt Haarms (redshirt)	7 ft 3 in (2.21 m)	250 lb (113 kg)	Fr	Sunrise Christian Academy	Amsterdam, the Netherlands
C	44	Isaac Haas	7 ft 2 in (2.18 m)	290 lb (132 kg)	Jr	Hokes Bluff High School	Hokes Bluff, Alabama
F	50	Caleb Swanigan	6 ft 9 in (2.06 m)	250 lb (113 kg)	So	Homestead High School (IN)	Fort Wayne, Indiana
G	55	Spike Albrecht (C)	6 ft 0 in (1.83 m)	180 lb (82 kg)	RS Sr	Michigan	Crown Point, Indiana

Head coach

- Matt Painter (Purdue)

Assistant coach(es)

- Jack Owens (Eastern Illinois)
- Greg Gary (Tulane)
- Brandon Brantley (Purdue)

Legend

- (C) Team captain
- (S) Suspended
- (I) Ineligible
- (W) Walk-on
- Injured
- Current redshirt

Roster

== Class of 2016 recruits ==
Carsen Edwards accepted Purdue's offer August 11, 2015. He knew other guards had official visits to the university scheduled, and wanted to accept his offer while he had the chance. He said, "If I were to wait and let them get there, I may miss a good opportunity, so I went ahead and took it."

Matt Haarms had his first official visit to Purdue in September 2016. Haarms liked Purdue's history of developing centers and forwards, saying "some of the greatest big men are coming out of Purdue." He committed to Purdue in October 2016.

College recruiting
Name	Hometown	School	Height	Weight	Commit date
Carsen Edwards #16 PG	Humble, TX	Atascocita High School	6 ft 1 in (1.85 m)	175 lb (79 kg)	Aug 11, 2015
Carsen Edwards #16 PG	Recruit ratings: Scout: Rivals: 247Sports: ESPN: (82)				
Matt Haarms; PF	Amsterdam, Netherlands	Sunrise Christian Academy	7 ft 3 in (2.21 m)	242 lb (110 kg)	Oct 5, 2016
Matt Haarms; PF	Recruit ratings: Scout: Rivals: 247Sports: ESPN: (80)				
Overall recruit ranking: Rivals: 27
Note: In many cases, Scout, Rivals, 247Sports, On3, and ESPN may conflict in their listings of height and weight.; In these cases, the average was taken. ESPN grades are on a 100-point scale.; Sources: "2016 Purdue Signees". Rivals.; "2016 Purdue Signees". Scout.; "2016 Purdue Signees". ESPN.; "Scout.com Team Recruiting Rankings". Scout.; "2016 Team Ranking". Rivals.

=== Class of 2017 recruits ===
College recruiting (2017)
Name	Hometown	School	Height	Weight	Commit date
Matt Haarms; PF	Amsterdam, Netherlands	Sunrise Christian Academy	7 ft 3 in (2.21 m)	242 lb (110 kg)	Oct 5, 2016
Matt Haarms; PF	Recruit ratings: Scout: Rivals: 247Sports: ESPN: (80)				
Aaron Wheeler; SF	Stamford, Connecticut	Brewster Academy	6 ft 8 in (2.03 m)	200 lb (91 kg)	Oct 17, 2016
Aaron Wheeler; SF	Recruit ratings: Scout: Rivals: 247Sports: ESPN: (78)				
Eden Ewing; PF	Richmond, Texas	Tyler Junior College	6 ft 7 in (2.01 m)	215 lb (98 kg)	Nov 7, 2016
Eden Ewing; PF	Recruit ratings: Scout: Rivals: 247Sports: ESPN: (JC)				
Nojel Eastern; PG	Evanston, Illinois	Evanston Township High School	6 ft 6 in (1.98 m)	210 lb (95 kg)	Nov 16, 2016
Nojel Eastern; PG	Recruit ratings: Scout: Rivals: 247Sports: ESPN: (83)				
Sasha Stefanovic; SG	Crown Point, Indiana	Crown Point High School	6 ft 4 in (1.93 m)	195 lb (88 kg)	Feb 3, 2016
Sasha Stefanovic; SG	Recruit ratings: Scout: Rivals: 247Sports: ESPN: (N/A)				
Overall recruit ranking: Rivals: 27
Note: In many cases, Scout, Rivals, 247Sports, On3, and ESPN may conflict in their listings of height and weight.; In these cases, the average was taken. ESPN grades are on a 100-point scale.; Sources: "2017 Purdue Signees". Rivals.; "2017 Purdue Signees". Scout.; "2017 Purdue Signees". ESPN.; "Scout.com Team Recruiting Rankings". Scout.; "2017 Team Ranking". Rivals.

== Schedule and results ==
Date time, TV	Rank^{#}	Opponent^{#}	Result	Record	High points	High rebounds	High assists	Site (attendance) city, state
Spanish exhibition tour
Aug 10, 2016*; 2:00 pm		at Eurocolegio Casvi	W 80–71		22 – Swanigan	11 – Swanigan	5 – Tied	Real Canoe NC; Madrid, Spain
Aug 11, 2016*; 11:30 am		at Albacete Basket (LEB Plata)	W 88–67		16 – Swanigan	9 – Swanigan	6 – Edwards	Pabellón del Parque; Albacete, Spain
Aug 14, 2015*; 8:00 pm		at Barcelona All-Stars	W 96–72		25 – Edwards	11 – Swanigan	4 – Tied	Barcelona, Spain
Aug 15, 2015*; 8:00 pm		at Europe Basketball Academy	W 117–66		19 – Thompson	12 – Swanigan	7 – Mathias	Barcelona, Spain
Exhibition
Nov 1, 2016*; 7:00 pm, BTN+	No. 15	Southern Indiana	W 85–63		25 – Haas	9 – Swanigan	7 – Swanigan	Mackey Arena (12,190); West Lafayette, IN
Non-conference regular season
Nov 11, 2016*; 7:00 pm, ESPN3	No. 15	McNeese State	W 109–65	1–0	23 – Swanigan	20 – Swanigan	6 – Swanigan	Mackey Arena (13,523); West Lafayette, IN
Nov 14, 2016*; 7:00 pm, BTN	No. 15	No. 3 Villanova; Gavitt Tipoff Games	L 76–79	1–1	22 – Haas	8 – Swanigan	8 – Edwards	Mackey Arena (14,804); West Lafayette, IN
Nov 18, 2016*; 7:00 pm, BTN	No. 15	Georgia State; Cancún Challenge	W 64–56	2–1	19 – Swanigan	11 – Swanigan	4 – Mathias	Mackey Arena (14,302); West Lafayette, IN
Nov 22, 2016*; 8:30 pm, CBSSN	No. 17	vs. Utah State; Cancún Challenge semifinals	W 85–64	3–1	26 – Haas	10 – Swanigan	4 – Tied	Hard Rock Hotel Riviera Maya (1,610); Cancún, Mexico
Nov 23, 2016*; 8:30 pm, CBSSN	No. 17	vs. Auburn; Cancún Challenge championship	W 96–71	4–1	21 – C. Edwards	10 – Tied	7 – Mathias	Hard Rock Hotel Riviera Maya (1,610); Cancún, Mexico
Nov 26, 2016*; 3:30 pm, ESPN3	No. 17	NJIT	W 79–68	5–1	22 – Swanigan	13 – Swanigan	5 – Edwards	Mackey Arena (10,479); West Lafayette, IN
Nov 30, 2016*; 7:00 pm, ESPN	No. 15	at No. 14 Louisville; ACC–Big Ten Challenge	L 64–71	5–2	14 – Swanigan	11 – Swanigan	4 – Mathias	KFC Yum! Center (21,841); Louisville, KY
Dec 3, 2016*; 2:00 pm, ESPN3	No. 15	Morehead State	W 90–56	6–2	16 – C. Edwards	9 – Swanigan	8 – V. Edwards	Mackey Arena (13,611); West Lafayette, IN
Dec 6, 2016*; 7:00 pm, ESPN	No. 18	vs. Arizona State; Jimmy V Classic	W 97–64	7–2	16 – Tied	10 – Swanigan	7 – Thompson	Madison Square Garden (15,294); New York City, NY
Dec 10, 2016*; 12:00 pm, ESPN3	No. 18	Cleveland State	W 77–53	8–2	14 – Haas	10 – Swanigan	7 – Mathias	Mackey Arena (14,283); West Lafayette, IN
Dec 17, 2016*; 2:00 pm, ESPN2	No. 15	vs. No. 21 Notre Dame; Crossroads Classic	W 86–81	9–2	26 – Swanigan	10 – Tied	6 – Thompson	Bankers Life Fieldhouse; Indianapolis, IN
Dec 19, 2016*; 6:00 pm, BTN	No. 15	Western Illinois	W 82–50	10–2	21 – Swanigan	21 – Swanigan	6 – V. Edwards	Mackey Arena (10,846); West Lafayette, IN
Dec 21, 2016*; 7:00 pm, BTN+	No. 15	Norfolk State	W 91–45	11–2	32 – Swanigan	20 – Swanigan	7 – Thompson	Mackey Arena (11,376); West Lafayette, IN
Big Ten regular season
Dec 28, 2016; 8:30 pm, BTN	No. 15	Iowa	W 89–67	12–2 (1–0)	19 – C. Edwards	10 – Swanigan	6 – Thompson	Mackey Arena (14,804); West Lafayette, IN
Jan 1, 2017; 4:30 pm, BTN	No. 15	Minnesota	L 82–91 ^{OT}	12–3 (1–1)	28 – Swanigan	22 – Swanigan	10 – Mathias	Mackey Arena (14,428); West Lafayette, IN
Jan 5, 2017; 7:00 pm, ESPN	No. 20	at Ohio State	W 76–75	13–3 (2–1)	16 – Tied	11 – Swanigan	4 – Tied	Value City Arena (13,221); Columbus, OH
Jan 8, 2017; 4:30 pm, CBS	No. 20	No. 13 Wisconsin	W 66–55	14–3 (3–1)	18 – Swanigan	13 – Swanigan	7 – Mathias	Mackey Arena (14,804); West Lafayette, IN
Jan 12, 2017; 9:00 pm, BTN	No. 17	at Iowa	L 78–83	14–4 (3–2)	17 – Swanigan	8 – Swanigan	4 – Tied	Carver–Hawkeye Arena (10,752); Iowa City, IA
Jan 17, 2017; 7:00 pm, BTN	No. 21	Illinois	W 91–68	15–4 (4–2)	22 – Swanigan	10 – Swanigan	6 – Mathias	Mackey Arena (13,920); West Lafayette, IN
Jan 21, 2017; 12:00 pm, BTN	No. 21	Penn State	W 77–52	16–4 (5–2)	19 – Swanigan	12 – Swanigan	4 – 3 tied	Mackey Arena (14,804); West Lafayette, IN
Jan 24, 2017; 7:00 pm, ESPN2	No. 20	at Michigan State	W 84–73	17–4 (6–2)	25 – Swanigan	17 – Swanigan	4 – V. Edwards	Breslin Center (14,797); East Lansing, MI
Jan 29, 2017; 4:30 pm, BTN	No. 20	at Nebraska	L 80–83	17–5 (6–3)	19 – Mathias	14 – Swanigan	6 – Tied	Pinnacle Bank Arena (15,715); Lincoln, NE
Feb 1, 2017; 8:30 pm, BTN	No. 23	No. 25 Northwestern	W 80–59	18–5 (7–3)	24 – Swanigan	16 – Swanigan	6 – Cline	Mackey Arena (14,804); West Lafayette, IN
Feb 4, 2017; 12:00 pm, ESPN	No. 23	at No. 17 Maryland	W 73–72	19–5 (8–3)	26 – Swanigan	10 – Swanigan	4 – Haas	Xfinity Center (17,950); College Park, MD
Feb 9, 2017; 7:00 pm, ESPN2	No. 16	at Indiana; Rivalry/Crimson and Gold Cup	W 69–64	20–5 (9–3)	26 – V. Edwards	14 – Swanigan	4 – C. Edwards	Assembly Hall (17,222); Bloomington, IN
Feb 14, 2017; 7:00 pm, BTN	No. 16	Rutgers	W 74–55	21–5 (10–3)	24 – Haas	17 – Swanigan	4 – Thompson	Mackey Arena (14,534); West Lafayette, IN
Feb 18, 2017; 4:00 pm, ESPN	No. 16	Michigan State	W 80–63	22–5 (11–3)	24 – Swanigan	15 – Swanigan	5 – Swanigan	Mackey Arena (14,804); West Lafayette, IN
Feb 21, 2017; 6:00 pm, BTN	No. 14	at Penn State	W 74–70 ^{OT}	23–5 (12–3)	14 – V. Edwards	9 – Swanigan	4 – Swanigan	Bryce Jordan Center (7,505); University Park, PA
Feb 25, 2017; 4:00 pm, ESPN2	No. 14	at Michigan	L 70–82	23–6 (12–4)	18 – Tied	6 – Haas	3 – V. Edwards	Crisler Center (12,707); Ann Arbor, MI
Feb 28, 2017; 7:00 pm, ESPN2	No. 16	Indiana; Rivalry/Crimson and Gold Cup	W 86–75	24–6 (13–4)	21 – Swanigan	10 – Swanigan	7 – V. Edwards	Mackey Arena (14,804); West Lafayette, IN
Mar 5, 2017; 4:30 pm, CBS	No. 16	at Northwestern	W 69–65	25–6 (14–4)	25 – V. Edwards	14 – Swanigan	5 – V. Edwards	Welsh-Ryan Arena (8,117); Evanston, IL
Big Ten tournament
Mar 10, 2017; 12:00 pm, ESPN	(1) No. 13	vs. (8) Michigan; Quarterfinals	L 70–74 ^{OT}	25–7	17 – Haas	13 – Swanigan	5 – Swanigan	Verizon Center (12,334); Washington, D.C.
NCAA tournament
Mar 16, 2017; 7:27 pm, truTV	(4 MW) No. 15	vs. (13 MW) Vermont; First Round	W 80–70	26–7	21 – V. Edwards	14 – Swanigan	6 – Mathias	BMO Harris Bradley Center (18,025); Milwaukee, WI
March 18, 2017; 9:45 pm, TBS	(4 MW) No. 15	vs. (5 MW) No. 17 Iowa State; Second Round	W 80–76	27–7	21 – V. Edwards	12 – Swanigan	7 – Swanigan	BMO Harris Bradley Center (18,045); Milwaukee, WI
March 23, 2017*; 8:29 pm, CBS	(4 MW) No. 15	vs. (1 MW) No. 3 Kansas; Sweet Sixteen	L 66–98	27–8	18 – Swanigan	7 – Swanigan	7 – Mathias	Sprint Center (18,475); Kansas City, MO
*Non-conference game. ^{#}Rankings from AP Poll. (#) Tournament seedings in parentheses. MW=Midwest Region. All times are in Eastern Time.

== Rankings ==
Ranking movements Legend: ██ Increase in ranking ██ Decrease in ranking
	Week																			
Poll	Pre	1	2	3	4	5	6	7	8	9	10	11	12	13	14	15	16	17	18	Final
AP	15	15	17	15	18	15	15	15	20	17	21	20	23	16	16	14	16	13	15	Not released
Coaches	15	15	19	16	19	16	15	15	20	19	22	20	24	18	16	14	16	12	15	15

*AP does not release post-NCAA tournament rankings

== Awards and honors ==
=== Caleb Swanigan ===
- Big Ten Player of the Year (media and coaches) (unanimous selection)
- All-Big Ten First Team (media and coaches) (unanimous selection)
- AP Big Ten Player of the year (unanimous selection)
- AP All-Big Ten First Team (unanimous selection)

=== Dakota Mathias ===
- All-Big Ten Honorable Mention (coaches and media)
- All-Big Ten Defensive Team

=== Vincent Edwards ===
- All-Big Ten Third Team (media)
- All-Big Ten Honorable Mention (coaches)

== See also ==
- 2016–17 Purdue Boilermakers women's basketball team
