= Basketball at the 2017 Summer Universiade – Men's tournament =

Men's basketball at the XXIX Summer Universiade
- Venue: various
- Dates: August 20, 2017 – August 29, 2017
- Teams: 24

Medalists
1st place, gold medalist(s)		Lithuania
2nd place, silver medalist(s)		United States
3rd place, bronze medalist(s)		Latvia

The men's tournament of basketball at the 2017 Summer Universiade in Taipei began on August 20 and ended on August 29.

== Teams ==
Africa	America	Asia	Europe	Oceania
Mozambique	Argentina; Canada; Mexico; United States	Chinese Taipei; Hong Kong; Japan; South Korea; United Arab Emirates	Czech Republic; Estonia; Finland; Germany; Hungary; Israel; Latvia; Lithuania; Norway; Romania; Russia; Serbia; Ukraine	Australia

- The United States was represented by Purdue University.

== Preliminary round ==
Qualified for the Final eight
Qualified for the 9th-16th place classification playoffs
Qualified for the 17th-24th Classification playoffs

=== Group A ===
Team	Pld	W	L	PF	PA	PD	Pts
Serbia	5	4	1	416	366	+50	9
Latvia	5	3	2	415	357	+58	8
Mexico	5	3	2	438	425	+13	8
Chinese Taipei	5	3	2	365	382	−17	8
Hungary	5	1	4	356	386	−30	6
South Korea	5	1	4	379	453	−74	6

20 August 2017
12:30 (UTC+8)

Report

South Korea	97–94	Mexico
Scoring by quarter: 27–16, 20–37, 27–15, 23–26

Taipei Heping Basketball Gymnasium
Referees: S. Emlek (TUR), M. Proc (POL), P. Hrusa (CZE)

20 August 2017
20:00 (UTC+8)

Report

Hungary	62–70	Serbia
Scoring by quarter: 15–19, 12–11, 19–10, 16–30

University of Taipei (Tianmu) Gymnasium
Referees: S. Beliakov (RUS), G. Vitkauskas (LTU), K.N. Apellaniz (USA)

20 August 2017
20:00 (UTC+8)

Report

Latvia	75–56	Chinese Taipei
Scoring by quarter: 19–13, 20–17, 15–11, 21–15

Taipei Arena
Referees: L.D. Zalazar (ARG), R.C. Kerrizon (CAN), V. Györgyi (NOR)

21 August 2017
17:30 (UTC+8)

Report

Serbia	91–64	South Korea
Scoring by quarter: 22–13, 28–15, 15–14, 26–22

University of Taipei (Tianmu) Gymnasium
Referees: J.A. Boyer (CAN), T. Suslov (EST), B. Mkyambadde (UGA)

21 August 2017
12:30 (UTC+8)

Report

Mexico	85–78	Latvia
Scoring by quarter: 20–22, 21–19, 20–17, 24–20

Taipei Arena
Referees: P. Marques (POR), S. Beliakov (RUS), S. Arisawa (JAP)

21 August 2017
20:00 (UTC+8)

Report

Chinese Taipei	75–61	Hungary
Scoring by quarter: 22–15, 15–10, 23–14, 15–22

Taipei Arena
Referees: A. Dadydov (RUS), K. Simonov (GER), H.M. Chan (HKG)

22 August 2017
12:30 (UTC+8)

Report

Latvia	87–90	Serbia
Scoring by quarter: 30–18, 20–26, 17–19, 20–27

Taipei Arena
Referees: J.R. Chapman (AUS), K. Simonov (GER), H.M. Chan (HKG)

22 August 2017
15:00 (UTC+8)

Report

South Korea	81–91	Hungary
Scoring by quarter: 18–20, 26–22, 19–30, 18–19

Taipei Heping Basketball Gymnasium
Referees: R.C. Kerrison (CAN), G.A. Todey (USA), J. Horiuchi (JAP)

22 August 2017
17:30 (UTC+8)

Report

Mexico	88–90	Chinese Taipei
Scoring by quarter: 26–25, 24–23, 12–24, 26–18

Taipei Heping Basketball Gymnasium
Referees: J.A. Boyer (CAN), V. Maciulaitis (LTU), R. Eriksson (SWE)

24 August 2017
17:30 (UTC+8)

Report

Hungary	65–78	Latvia
Scoring by quarter: 22–16, 16–19, 12–10, 15–33

Hsinchu Municipal Gymnasium
Referees: S. Chebyshev (UKR), P. Hrusa (CZE), A.M. Del Col (CAN)

24 August 2017
15:00 (UTC+8)

Report

Serbia	83–89	Mexico
Scoring by quarter: 24–14, 17–26, 28–17, 14–32

Taipei Heping Basketball Gymnasium
Referees: A. Davydov (RUS), N. Saunders (CAN), T. Suslov (EST)

24 August 2017
20:00 (UTC+8)

Report

Chinese Taipei	80–76	South Korea
Scoring by quarter: 21–20, 22–22, 19–14, 18–20

Taipei Arena
Referees: J.R. Chapman (AUS), G. Vitkauskas (LTU), A. Czender (ROU)

25 August 2017
15:00 (UTC+8)

Report

Mexico	82–77	Hungary
Scoring by quarter: 24–25, 20–19, 20–16, 18–17

Hsinchu Municipal Gymnasium
Referees: L.D. Zalazar (ARG), G. Vitkauskas (LTU), M. Proc (POL)

25 August 2017
15:00 (UTC+8)

Report

Latvia	97–61	South Korea
Scoring by quarter: 16–18, 31–15, 23–14, 27–14

University of Taipei (Tianmu) Gymnasium
Referees: N. Saunders (CAN), R. Eriksson (SWE), F.V. Barrera (CHI)

25 August 2017
20:00 (UTC+8)

Report

Serbia	82–64	Chinese Taipei
Scoring by quarter: 19–14, 24–16, 19–12, 20–22

Hsinchu Municipal Gymnasium
Referees: R.C. Kerrison (CAN), S. Beliakov (RUS), P. Hrusa (CZE)

=== Group B ===
Team	Pld	W	L	PF	PA	PD	Pts
Germany	5	5	0	455	304	+151	10
Finland	5	4	1	421	305	+116	9
Canada	5	3	2	438	344	+94	8
Norway	5	2	3	348	356	−8	7
Japan	5	1	4	327	430	−103	6
Hong Kong	5	0	5	294	544	−250	5

20 August 2017
17:30 (UTC+8)

Report

Finland	94–48	Japan
Scoring by quarter: 24–12, 24–14, 26–13, 20–9

Hsinchu Municipal Gymnasium
Referees: J.R. Chapman (AUS), C.H. Chen (TPE), J. Smiljanic (SRB)

20 August 2017
17:30 (UTC+8)

Report

Norway	54–85	Canada
Scoring by quarter: 18–19, 13–23, 14–17, 9–26

University of Taipei (Tianmu) Gymnasium
Referees: T. Benczur (HUN), A. Csender (ROU), M.L. Sung (TPE)

20 August 2017
15:00 (UTC+8)

Report

Hong Kong	50–119	Germany
Scoring by quarter: 16–37, 6–18, 17–37, 11–27

Taipei Arena
Referees: J.A. Boyer (AUS), H.S. Carrizales (MEX), B.M. Kyambadde (UGA)

21 August 2017
10:00 (UTC+8)

Report

Canada	71–79	Finland
Scoring by quarter: 19–19, 8–21, 12–29, 32–10

University of Taipei (Tianmu) Gymnasium
Referees: V. Maciulaitis (LTU), G. Kapitany (HUN), S. Lee (KOR)

21 August 2017
10:00 (UTC+8)

Report

Japan	86–82	Hong Kong
Scoring by quarter: 23–19, 31–16, 12–24, 20–23

Taipei Heping Basketball Gymnasium
Referees: T. Benczur (HUN), R. Eriksson (SWE), M.L. Sung (TPE)

21 August 2017
17:30 (UTC+8)

Report

Germany	83–58	Norway
Scoring by quarter: 16–17, 22–14, 25–11, 20–16

Taipei Arena
Referees: L.D. Zalazar (ARG), S. Emlek (TUR), P. Hrusa (CZE)

22 August 2017
17:30 (UTC+8)

Report

Hong Kong	55–125	Canada
Scoring by quarter: 15–30, 17–27, 18–38, 5–30

Hsinchu Municipal Gymnasium
Referees: A. Dadydov (RUS), F.V. Barrera (CHI), S.A. Chiau (MOZ)

22 August 2017
17:30 (UTC+8)

Report

Finland	70–63	Norway
Scoring by quarter: 22–7, 19–26, 24–15, 5–15

Taipei Arena
Referees: O. Lucis (LAT), M. Proc (POL), S.H. Wei (TPE)

22 August 2017
17:30 (UTC+8)

Report

Japan	59–97	Germany
Scoring by quarter: 13–21, 17–24, 17–27, 12–25

Hsinchu Municipal Gymnasium
Referees: A. Davidov (RUS), F.V. Barrera (CHI), J. Yu (TPE)

24 August 2017
12:30 (UTC+8)

Report

Norway	100–55	Hong Kong
Scoring by quarter: 27–11, 27–13, 29–19, 17–12

Taipei Heping Basketball Gymnasium
Referees: V. Maciulaitis (LTU), Y.S. An (KOR), J. Smiljanic (SRB)

24 August 2017
20:00 (UTC+8)

Report

Canada	84–71	Japan
Scoring by quarter: 20–11, 20–16, 21–19, 23–25

Hsinchu Municipal Gymnasium
Referees: O. Lucis (LAT), M.A. Prado (ARG), B.M. Kyambadde (UGA)

24 August 2017
17:30 (UTC+8)

Report

Germany	71–64	Finland
Scoring by quarter: 23–11, 15–18, 23–18, 10–17

Taipei Arena
Referees: P. Marques (POR), S. Beliakov (RUS), T. Benczur (HUN)

25 August 2017
12:30 (UTC+8)

Report

Japan	63–73	Norway
Scoring by quarter: 14–14, 7–19, 22–18, 20–22

University of Taipei (Tianmu) Gymnasium
Referees: R. Eriksson (SWE), K.N. Apellaniz (USA), M.L. Sung (TPE)

25 August 2017
20:00 (UTC+8)

Report

Hong Kong	52–114	Finland
Scoring by quarter: 12–19, 13–28, 7–32, 20–35

University of Taipei (Tianmu) Gymnasium
Referees: G.A. Todey (USA), J. Yu (TPE), Y.S. An (KOR)

25 August 2017
15:00 (UTC+8)

Report

Canada	73–85	Germany
Scoring by quarter: 28–14, 12–19, 12–19, 21–33

Taipei Arena
Referees: S. Chebyshev (UKR), J.A. Boyer (AUS), C.H. Chen (TPE)

=== Group C ===
Team	Pld	W	L	PF	PA	PD	Pts
United States	5	5	0	544	330	+214	10
Argentina	5	4	1	433	306	+127	9
Estonia	5	3	2	377	381	−4	8
Czech Republic	5	2	3	391	392	−1	7
Romania	5	1	4	350	408	−58	6
United Arab Emirates	5	0	5	284	562	−278	5

20 August 2017
15:00 (UTC+8)

Report

Romania	60–72	Czech Republic
Scoring by quarter: 13–18, 20–22, 15–17, 12–15

Taipei Heping Basketball Gymnasium
Referees: S. Chebyshev (UKR), V. Maciulaitis (LTU), S.H. Wei (TPE)

20 August 2017
17:30 (UTC+8)

Report

United Arab Emirates	52–97	Estonia
Scoring by quarter: 18–20, 7–32, 16–21, 11–24

Taipei Heping Basketball Gymnasium
Referees: K. Simonov (GER), J. Yu (TPE), J. Horiuchi (JAP)

20 August 2017
17:30 (UTC+8)

Report

Argentina	76–89	United States
Scoring by quarter: 14–26, 19–17, 15–27, 28–19

Taipei Arena
Referees: O. Lucis (LAT), A. Davydov (RUS), S. Lee (KOR)

21 August 2017
12:30 (UTC+8)

Report

Estonia	74–72	Romania
Scoring by quarter: 27–23, 23–13, 9–20, 15–16

University of Taipei (Tianmu) Gymnasium
Referees: N. Sanders (CAN), M. Proc (POL), Y.S. An (KOR)

21 August 2017
10:00 (UTC+8)

Report

Czech Republic	49–87	Argentina
Scoring by quarter: 17–14, 11–28, 10–27, 11–18

Taipei Arena
Referees: S. Beliakov (RUS), P. Marques (POR), S. Arisawa (JAP)

21 August 2017
15:30 (UTC+8)

Report

United States	127–53	United Arab Emirates
Scoring by quarter: 35–14, 23–10, 32–18, 37–11

University of Taipei (Tianmu) Gymnasium
Referees: N. Sanders (CAN), M. Proc (POL), Y.S. An (KOR)

23 August 2017
12:30 (UTC+8)

Report

Argentina	78–65	Estonia
Scoring by quarter: 22–17, 18–16, 17–14, 21–18

Taipei Arena
Referees: S. Chebyshev (UKR), J.A. Boyer (AUS), T. Benczur (HUN)

23 August 2017
20:00 (UTC+8)

Report

Romania	103–71	United Arab Emirates
Scoring by quarter: 26–17, 26–15, 28–21, 23–18

University of Taipei (Tianmu) Gymnasium
Referees: S. Beliakov (RUS), J. Horiuchi (JAP), M.L. Sung (TPE)

23 August 2017
17:30 (UTC+8)

Report

Czech Republic	78–107	United States
Scoring by quarter: 14–32, 32–24, 18–26, 14–25

Taipei Arena
Referees: J.R. Chapman (AUS), G. Vitkauskas (LTU), C.H. Chen (TPE)

24 August 2017
20:00 (UTC+8)

Report

Estonia	80–78	Czech Republic
Scoring by quarter: 18–26, 29–16, 12–16, 21–20

University of Taipei (Tianmu) Gymnasium
Referees: R.C. Kerrison (CAN), S. Emlek (TUR), H.S. Carrizales (MEX)

24 August 2017
20:00 (UTC+8)

Report

United Arab Emirates	50–121	Argentina
Scoring by quarter: 10–29, 16–31, 13–36, 11–25

Taipei Heing Basketball Gymnasium
Referees: G. Kapitany (HUN), C.H. Chen (TPE), H.M. Chan (HKG)

24 August 2017
15:00 (UTC+8)

Report

United States	120–62	Romania
Scoring by quarter: 32–13, 36–11, 30–23, 22–15

Taipei Arena
Referees: F.V. Barrera (CHI), J.A. Boyer (AUS), J. Yu (TPE)

25 August 2017
12:30 (UTC+8)

Report

Czech Republic	114–58	United Arab Emirates
Scoring by quarter: 26–13, 32–14, 34–20, 22–11

Taipei Heping Basketball Gymnasium
Referees: P. Marques (POR), S.H. Wei (TPE), B.M. Kyambadde (UGA)

25 August 2017
15:00 (UTC+8)

Report

Argentina	71–53	Romania
Scoring by quarter: 15–15, 22–15, 27–13, 7–10

Taipei Heping Basketball Gymnasium
Referees: S. Arisawa (JAP), S.H. Wei (TPE), B.M. Kyambadde (UGA)

25 August 2017
12:30 (UTC+8)

Report

Estonia	61–101	United States
Scoring by quarter: 12–33, 23–27, 11–20, 15–21

Taipei Arena
Referees: S. Chebyshev (UKR), G. Kapitany (HUN), C.H. Chen (TPE)

=== Group D ===
Team	Pld	W	L	PF	PA	PD	Pts
Lithuania	5	4	1	471	331	+140	9
Israel	5	4	1	464	358	+106	9
Ukraine	5	4	1	412	364	+48	9
Australia	5	3	2	408	380	+28	8
Russia	5	1	4	383	432	−49	6
Mozambique	5	0	5	236	509	−273	5

20 August 2017
12:30 (UTC+8)

Report

Australia	76–80	Ukraine
Scoring by quarter: 18–18, 15–20, 21–18, 22–24

Taipei Arena
Referees: G.A. Todey (USA), F.V. Barrera (CHI), S. Arisawa (JAP)

20 August 2017
20:00 (UTC+8)

Report

Israel	70–79	Lithuania
Scoring by quarter: 8–18, 23–12, 11–18, 28–31

Hisnchu Municipal Gymnasium
Referees: P. Marques (POR), G. Kapitany (HUN), R. Eriksson (SWE)

20 August 2017
20:00 (UTC+8)

Report

Mozambique	52–96	Russia
Scoring by quarter: 8–20, 14–28, 13–21, 17–27

Taipei Heping Basketball Gymnasium
Referees: T. Suslov (EST), H.M. Chan (HKG), Y.S. An (KOR)

21 August 2017
15:00 (UTC+8)

Report

Lithuania	82–84	Australia
Scoring by quarter: 22–23, 15–21, 19–28, 26–12

Taipei Arena
Referees: L.D. Zalazar (ARG), S. Emlek (TUR), P. Hrusa (CZE)

21 August 2017
12:30 (UTC+8)

Report

Ukraine	111–42	Mozambique
Scoring by quarter: 28–5, 28–15, 22–5, 33–17

Taipei Heping Basketball Gymnasium
Referees: T. Benczur (HUN), R. Eriksson (SWE), M.L. Sung (TPE)

21 August 2017
15:30 (UTC+8)

Report

Russia	80–107	Israel
Scoring by quarter: 16–25, 22–31, 25–25, 17–26

University of Taipei (Tianmu) Gymnasium
Referees: G.A. Todey (USA), R.C. Kerrison (CAN), J. Yu (TPE)

23 August 2017
12:30 (UTC+8)

Report

Mozambique	35–122	Lithuania
Scoring by quarter: 15–22, 3–27, 10–29, 7–44

University of Tiapei (Tianmu) Gymnasium
Referees: R.C. Kerrison (CAN), A.M. Del Col (CAN), S.H. Wei (TPE)

23 August 2017
15:00 (UTC+8)

Report

Australia	72–89	Israel
Scoring by quarter: 21–25, 14–20, 25–21, 12–23

University of Taipei (Tianmu) Gymnasium
Referees: O. Lucis (LAT), K.Simonov (GER), T. Suslov (EST)

23 August 2017
15:00 (UTC+8)

Report

Ukraine	72–65	Russia
Scoring by quarter: 9–14, 24–12, 12–18, 27–21

Taipei Heping Basketball Gymnasium
Referees: P. Marques (MEX), N. Sanders (CAN), P. Hrusa (CZE)

24 August 2017
17:30 (UTC+8)

Report

Israel	93–49	Mozambique
Scoring by quarter: 23–15, 29–9, 17–11, 24–14

Taipei Heping Basketball Gymnasium
Referees: J. Horiuchi (JAP), V. Györgyi (NOR), K.N. Apellaniz (USA)

24 August 2017
17:30 (UTC+8)

Report

Lithuania	76–71	Ukraine
Scoring by quarter: 18–18, 16–16, 22–20, 20–17

University of Taipei (Tianmu) Gymnasium
Referees: G.A. Todey (USA), K. Simonov (GER), S. Lee (KOR)

24 August 2017
12:30 (UTC+8)

Report

Russia	71–89	Australia
Scoring by quarter: 19–25, 17–31, 12–14, 23–19

Taipei Arena
Referees: L.D. Zalazar (ARG), M. Proc (POL), R. Eriksson (SWE)

25 August 2017
17:30 (UTC+8)

Report

Lithuania	112–71	Russia
Scoring by quarter: 31–18, 30–11, 24–24, 27–18

University of Taipei (Tianmu) Gymnasium
Referees: F.V. Barrera (CHI), J. Horiuchi (JAP), T. Benczur (HUN)

25 August 2017
10:00 (UTC+8)

Report

Mozambique	58–87	Australia
Scoring by quarter: 10–18, 14–19, 16–29, 18–21

Taipei Arena
Referees: O. Lucis (LAT), G.A. Todey (USA), G. Kapitany (HUN)

25 August 2017
17:30 (UTC+8)

Report

Ukraine	78–105	Israel
Scoring by quarter: 16–23, 12–26, 25–28, 25–28

Hsinchu Municipal Gymnasium
Referees: L.D. Zalazar (ARG), R.C. Kerrison (CAN), M. Proc (POL)

== Classification rounds ==
=== Quarterfinal round ===
==== 17th–24th place ====
27 August 2017
12:30 (UTC+8)

Report

Hungary	100–90 (OT)	Hong Kong
Scoring by quarter: 26–17, 17–12, 21–27, 19–24, Overtime: 14–4

Taipei Arena
Referees: K. Simonov (GER), K.N. Apellaniz (USA), B.M. Kyambadde (UGA)

27 August 2017
12:30 (UTC+8)

Report

Japan	84–80	South Korea
Scoring by quarter: 21–15, 17–12, 28–24, 18–29

Hisnchu Municipal Gymnasium
Referees: J. Yu (TPE), V. Györgyi (NOR), S.A. Chiau (MOZ)

27 August 2017
12:30 (UTC+8)

Report

Romania	89–61	Mozambique
Scoring by quarter: 10–17, 20–18, 24–20, 35–6

University of Taipei (Tianmu) Gymnastic
Referees: M.A. Prado (ARG), J. Smiljanic (SRB), H.M. Chan (HKG)

27 August 2017
12:30 (UTC+8)

Report

Russia	116–55	United Arab Emirates
Scoring by quarter: 32–15, 32–14, 22–15, 30–13

Taipei Heping Basketball Gymnasium
Referees: S. Lee (KOR), Y.S. An (KOR), L.M. Sung (TPE)

==== 9th–16th place ====
27 August 2017
17:30 (UTC+8)

Report

Mexico	81–75	Norway
Scoring by quarter: 20–22, 23–22, 18–17, 20–14

Hsinchu Municipal Gymnasium
Referees: G.A. Todey (USA), J.A. Boyer (AUS), A.M. Del Colo (CAN)

27 August 2017
15:00 (UTC+8)

Report

Canada	98–61	Chinese Taipei
Scoring by quarter: 21–9, 23–14, 26–18, 28–20

Hsinchu Municipal Gymnasium
Referees: T. Benczur (HUN), R. Eriksson (SWE), H.S. Carrizales (MEX)

27 August 2017
15:00 (UTC+8)

Report

Estonia	83–105	Australia
Scoring by quarter: 19–24, 12–24, 28–27, 24–30

University of Taipei (Tianmu) Gymnasium
Referees: G. Vikauskas (LTU), F.V. Barrera (CHI), J. Horiuchi (JAP)

27 August 2017
17:30 (UTC+8)

Report

Ukraine	79–84	Czech Republic
Scoring by quarter: 21–18, 20–20, 17–25, 21–21

University of Taipei (Tianmu) Gymnasium
Referees: V. Maciukaitis (LTU), G. Kapitany (HUN), A. Csender (ROU)

=== Semifinal round ===
==== 21st–24th place ====
28 August 2017
12:30 (UTC+8)

Report

South Korea	99–40	United Arab Emirates
Scoring by quarter: 26–9, 33–7, 17–9, 23–15

Hsinchu Municipal Gymnasium
Referees: S. Emlek (TUR), H.M. Chan (HKG), B.M. Kyambadde (UGA)

28 August 2017
12:30 (UTC+8)

Report

Hong Kong	84–71	Mozambique
Scoring by quarter: 26–21, 16–14, 22–17, 20–19

University of Taipei (Tianmu) Gymnasium
Referees: J. Horiuchi (JAP), S. Lee (KOR), G. Kapitany (HUN)

==== 17th–20th place ====
28 August 2017
20:00 (UTC+8)

Report

Japan	78–84	Russia
Scoring by quarter: 22–22, 20–23, 17–17, 19–22

Taipei Heping Basketball Gymnasium
Referees: G.A. Todey (USA), M. Proc (POL), J.R. Chapman (AUS)

28 August 2017
20:00 (UTC+8)

Report

Hungary	74–50	Romania
Scoring by quarter: 12–19, 10–8, 31–14, 21–9

University of Taipei (Tianmu) Gymnasium
Referees: L.D. Zalazar (ARG), N. Saunders (CAN), V. Maciulaitis (LTU)

==== 13th–16th place ====
28 August 2017
15:00 (UTC+8)

Report

Norway	90–85	Estonia
Scoring by quarter: 13–24, 25–22, 29–16, 23–23

Hsinchu Municipal Gymnasium
Referees: R.C. Kerrison (CAN), J. Yu (TPE), B.M. Kyambadde (UGA)

28 August 2017
15:00 (UTC+8)

Report

Chinese Taipei	86–80	Ukraine
Scoring by quarter: 23–24, 22–20, 21–18, 20–18

University of Tiapei (Tianmu) Gymnasium
Referees: O. Lucis (LAT), J.A. Boyer (AUS), J. Yu (TPE)

==== 9th–12th place ====
28 August 2017
15:00 (UTC+8)

Report

Canada	97–79	Czech Republic
Scoring by quarter: 17–18, 29–20, 27–18, 24–23

Taipei Heping Basketball Gymnasium
Referees: T. Suslov (EST), G. Vitkauskas (LTU), K.N. Apellaniz (USA)

28 August 2017
20:00 (UTC+8)

Report

Mexico	71–93	Australia
Scoring by quarter: 19–29, 18–22, 18–22, 16–20

Hsinchu Municipal Gymnasium
Referees: P. Hrusa (CZE), K. Simonov (GER), S. Arisawa (JAP)

==== 5th–8th place ====
28 August 2017
17:30 (UTC+8)

Report

Finland	79–97	Israel
Scoring by quarter: 24–15, 15–26, 17–32, 23–24

Hsinchu Municipal Gymnasium
Referees: P. Hrusa (CZE), K. Simonov (GER), S. Arisawa (JAP)

28 August 2017
17:30 (UTC+8)

Report

Germany	95–82	Argentina
Scoring by quarter: 17–21, 29–19, 24–21, 25–21

University of Taipei (Tianmu) Gymnasium
Referees: O. Lucis (LAT), J.A. Boyer (AUS), J. Yu (TPE)

=== Final round ===
==== 23rd place game ====
29 August 2017
12:30 (UTC+8)

Report

United Arab Emirates	71–104	Mozambique
Scoring by quarter: 15–27, 15–32, 19–27, 22–18

University of Taipei (Tianmu) Gymnasium
Referees: S. Beliakov (RUS), J. Yu (TPE), S.H. Wei (TPE)

==== 21st place game ====
29 August 2017
12:30 (UTC+8)

Report

South Korea	103–96	Hong Kong
Scoring by quarter: 23–27, 27–24, 28–25, 25–20

Taipei Heping Basketball Gymnasium
Referees: S. Arisawa (JAP), M.A. Prado (ARG), M.L. Sung (TPE)

==== 19th place game ====
29 August 2017
15:00 (UTC+8)

Report

Japan	75–87	Romania
Scoring by quarter: 16–25, 14–15, 16–18, 29–29

University of Taipei (Tianmu) Gymnasium
Referees: K. Simonov (GER), H.S. Carrizales (MEX), S.A. Chiau (MOZ)

==== 17th place game ====
29 August 2017
15:00 (UTC+8)

Report

Hungary	67–74	Russia
Scoring by quarter: 9–24, 21–18, 27–14, 10–18

Taipei Heping Basketball Gymnasium
Referees: J.A. Boyer (AUS), A. Csender (ROU), B.M. Kyambadde (UGA)

==== 15th place game ====
29 August 2017
12:30 (UTC+8)

Report

Estonia	83–91	Ukraine
Scoring by quarter: 16–26, 19–20, 21–20, 27–25

Hsinchu Municipal Gymnasium
Referees: T. Benczur (HUN), R. Eriksson (SWE), Y.S. An (KOR)

==== 13th place game ====
29 August 2017
15:00 (UTC+8)

Report

Norway	77–89	Chinese Taipei
Scoring by quarter: 17–26, 24–24, 13–25, 23–14

University of Taipei (Tianmu) Gymnasium
Referees: S. Chebyshev (UKR), M. Proc (POL), J. Smiljanic (SRB)

==== 11th place game ====
29 August 2017
17:30 (UTC+8)

Report

Czech Republic	69–93	Mexico
Scoring by quarter: 11–19, 15–24, 18–25, 25–25

Hsinchu Municipal Gymnasium
Referees: L.D. Zalazar (ARG), J.R. Chapman (AUS), A.M. Del Col (CAN)

==== 9th place game ====
29 August 2017
17:30 (UTC+8)

Report

Canada	96–101	Australia
Scoring by quarter: 40–35, 14–18, 25–26, 17–22

University of Taipei (Tianmu) Gymnasium
Referees: V. Maciulaitis (LTU), S. Lee (KOR), V. Györgyi (NOR)

==== 7th place game ====
29 August 2017
12:30 (UTC+8)

Report

Finland	79–70	Argentina
Scoring by quarter: 11–18, 24–14, 25–17, 19–21

Taipei Arena
Referees: G. Vitkauskas (LTU), F.V. Barrera (CHI), J. Horiuchi (JAP)

==== 5th place game ====
29 August 2017
15:00 (UTC+8)

Report

Israel	78–87	Germany
Scoring by quarter: 20–30, 19–21, 22–19, 17–17

Taipei Arena
Referees: N. Saunders (CAN), T. Suslov (EST), G.A. Todey (USA)

== Championship playoffs ==
Quarterfinals
A1	Serbia	85
B2	Finland	84
C1	United States	111
D2	Israel	107
B1	Germany	76
A2	Latvia	78
D1	Lithuania	72
C2	Argentina	70

Semifinals
A1	Serbia	61
C1	United States	93
A2	Latvia	75
D1	Lithuania	77

Gold Medal Game
C1	United States	74
D1	Lithuania	85
Bronze Medal Game
A1	Serbia	74
A2	Latvia	81

=== Quarterfinals ===
27 August 2017
15:00 (UTC+8)

Report

Serbia	85–84 (OT)	Finland
Scoring by quarter: 17–21, 10–12, 17–24, 22–9, Overtime: 19–18

Taipei Heping Basketball Gymnasium
Referees: O. Lucis (LAT), J.R. Chapman (USA), H.Y. Chen (TPE)

27 August 2017
17:30 (UTC+8)

Report

Germany	76–78	Latvia
Scoring by quarter: 20–19, 16–22, 17–21, 23–16

Taipei Heping Basketball Gymnasium
Referees: L.D. Zalazar (ARG), R.C. Kerrison (CAN), M. Proc (POL)

27 August 2017
15:00 (UTC+8)

Report

United States	111–107 (OT)	Israel
Scoring by quarter: 19–23, 26–26, 26–17, 26–31, Overtime: 14–10

Taipei Arena
Referees: P. Marques (POR), S. Beliakov (RUS), P. Hrusa (CZE)

27 August 2017
17:30 (UTC+8)

Report

Lithuania	72–70	Argentina
Scoring by quarter: 16–24, 20–14, 20–14, 16–18

Taipei Arena
Referees: N. Saunders (CAN), T. Suslov (EST), S. Emlek (TUR)

=== Semifinals ===
28 August 2017
12:30 (UTC+8)

Report

Serbia	61–93	United States
Scoring by quarter: 15–25, 8–21, 13–33, 25–14

Taipei Arena
Referees: L.D. Zalazar (ARG), N. Saunders (CAN), V. Maciulaitis (LTU)

28 August 2017
15:00 (UTC+8)

Report

Latvia	75–77	Lithuania
Scoring by quarter: 17–13, 16–23, 23–20, 19–21

Taipei Arena
Referees: S. Chebychev (UKR), T. Benczur (HUN), R. Eriksson (SWE)

=== Bronze medal game ===
29 August 2017
17:00 (UTC+8)

Report

Serbia	74–81	Latvia
Scoring by quarter: 20–14, 15–12, 13–25, 26–30

Taipei Arena
Referees: R.C. Kerrison (CAN), S. Emlek (TUR), P. Hrusa (CZE)

=== Gold medal game ===
29 August 2017
20:00 (UTC+8)

Report

United States	74–85	Lithuania
Scoring by quarter: 17–19, 21–17, 18–25, 18–24
Pts: C. Edwards 23; Rebs: Taylor 7 Asts: Mathias 4		Pts: Vaitkus 15; Rebs: Tarolis 12; Asts: Bičkauskis 4

Taipei Arena
Referees: P. Marques (POR), O. Lucis (LAT), C.H. Chen (TPE)

== Final standings ==
Place	Team	Record
1st place, gold medalist(s)	Lithuania	7–1
2nd place, silver medalist(s)	United States	7–1
3rd place, bronze medalist(s)	Latvia	5–3
4	Serbia	5–3
5	Germany	7–1
6	Israel	5–3
7	Finland	5–3
8	Argentina	4–4
9	Australia	6–2
10	Canada	5–3
11	Mexico	5–3
12	Czech Republic	3–5
13	Chinese Taipei	5–3
14	Norway	3–5
15	Ukraine	4–4
16	Estonia	3–5
17	Russia	4–4
18	Hungary	3–5
19	Romania	3–5
20	Japan	2–6
21	South Korea	3–5
22	Hong Kong	1–7
23	Mozambique	1–7
24	United Arab Emirates	0–8
