= West End High School =

West End High School can refer to:

- West End High School (Birmingham, Alabama) United States
- West End High School (Walnut Grove, Alabama) United States
- West End High and Elementary School, former school for African Americans in Hogansville, Georgia
- West End High School (Nashville, Tennessee) United States
- West End High School (Dhaka, Bangladesh)
