= George Herring =

American gridiron football player (1933–1994)

No. 97, 83, 16
- Positions: Quarterback, punter

Personal information
- Born: June 18, 1933; Gadsden, Alabama, U.S.
- Died: November 8, 1994 (aged 61); Arizona, U.S.
- Listed height: 6 ft 2 in (1.88 m)
- Listed weight: 200 lb (91 kg)

Career information
- High school: Hokes Bluff (Hokes Bluff, Alabama)
- College: Mississippi Southern
- NFL draft: 1956: 16th round, 184th overall pick

Career history
- BC Lions (1958); Saskatchewan Roughriders (1959); Houston Oilers (1960)*; Denver Broncos (1960-1961); Calgary Stampeders (1962)
- * Offseason or practice squad member only

Career AFL statistics
- Passing attempts: 233
- Passing completions: 102
- Completion percentage: 43.8%
- TD–INT: 5–23
- Passing yards: 1,297
- Passer rating: 29.3
- Stats at Pro Football Reference

George W. Herring (June 18, 1933 - November 8, 1994) was a professional American football quarterback and punter in the American Football League (AFL). Herring played with the Denver Broncos in 1960 and 1961.

Herring played college football at Jones County Junior College and then transferred to Mississippi Southern in Hattiesburg. Selected by the San Francisco 49ers in the sixteenth round (184th overall) of the 1956 NFL draft, Herring instead joined the United States Army. Following his discharge from the Army, he signed in Canada and threw eight touchdowns to 20 interceptions in two seasons with the B.C. Lions and Saskatchewan Roughriders. In 1960, he joined the Broncos at the start of the AFL. In Denver, Herring backed up his roommate Frank Tripucka and threw five touchdowns to 23 interceptions while also serving as the team's punter. In a 1961 loss at Houston on November 26, he threw a franchise record six interceptions.

Herring had a problem with alcohol and was found homeless on the streets of Denver in 1982. After staying sober for several years, he had a relapse in 1994 and died by suicide within two days of his 25-year-old son Lance also killing himself.
