= Glencoe High School (Alabama) =

Coordinates: 33.9677°N 85.9356°W

Location
- 803 Lonesome Bend Road; Glencoe, Alabama 35905; United States

Information
- Type: Public
- School district: Etowah County Schools
- CEEB code: 011240
- Principal: Brian Alred
- Teaching staff: 16.91 (FTE)
- Grades: 9-12
- Enrollment: 300 (2024-2025)
- Student to teacher ratio: 17.74
- Colors: Black and gold
- Athletics: Football, Basketball, Volleyball, Baseball, Golf, Track, Cross Country, Soccer
- Athletics conference: AHSAA, Class 3A
- Mascot: Buzz the Yellowjacket
- Nickname: Yellow Jackets
- Rival: Hokes Bluff High School
- Website: ghs.ecboe.org

Glencoe High School is a public high school, located in Glencoe, Alabama, United States serving approximately 339 students in grades nine through twelve. The school is part of the Etowah County Schools.

The school is accredited by the Southern Association of Colleges and Schools. Glencoe High School is recognized in the National Rankings and earned a silver medal by Newsweek's Best High Schools in American. Schools are ranked based on their performance on state-required tests and how well they prepare students for college.

== History ==
Glencoe High School opened in 1918. A middle school was added in later years. The high school's current building was rebuilt in 2006 at the same location as the former school.

== Athletics ==
Athletic teams are called the Yellow Jackets and the official school colors are black and gold. The Glencoe football team won the Class 2A state championship in 1973. They won regional championships in 1978, 1979, 1981, 1995, 1996, and 2014.

The Glencoe football team added the first ever female player, Kaitlyn Smith, to their roster as their kicker in 2015.

== Band ==
The Glencoe High School Band performed at the 2014 Sugar Bowl.

== Alumni ==
Notable alumni of Glencoe High School include:

- Shannon Camper (class of 1998), Miss Alabama 2004
- Jana Sanderson (class of 1997), Miss Alabama 2000
