= Southside High School (Southside, Alabama) =

High school in Alabama, United States

Coordinates: 33°55′19″N 86°01′25″W

Southside High School is the largest school in the Etowah County Schools system, serving 900 students from Southside and Rainbow City from grades 9 through 12. The schoolhouse was constructed in 2007. Its mascot is the black panther and its colors are maroon and black. Its student population (92.2% White, 3.6% Black, 2.2% Hispanic and 2.0% other) has a 91% graduation rate.

== Administration ==
Julie Tucker is Southside's principal.
