= Sardis High School =

Location
- 1420 Church Street; Sardis City, Alabama 35956; United States; 34.1761°N 86.1227°W

Information
- Type: Public high school
- School district: Etowah County Schools
- Superintendent: Alan Cosby
- Principal: Josh Wallace
- Teaching staff: 32.34 (FTE)
- Grades: 9-12
- Enrollment: 585 (2023-2024)
- Student to teacher ratio: 18.09
- Colors: Maroon and white
- Team name: Lions
- Website: shs.ecboe.org

Sardis High School is a public high school in Sardis City, Alabama, United States. It is a part of Etowah County Schools.

== Athletics ==
The Sardis High School athletic department fields teams in baseball, basketball, cross country, football, golf, softball, volleyball, track & field, tennis, and swimming. Sardis’ athletic teams compete in the (5A) classification of the Alabama High School Athletic Association. (AHSAA).

Football: The Sardis High School football team competes in Class 5A of AHSAA. The team was first organized in 1934 and has an all-time record of 351–458–22. The team is currently coached by Wes Tidwell. The longest serving head football coach in school history is Jerry Don Sims. Sims served from 1971–1985 and compiled an overall record of 78–74–1. Sardis’ longest running rivalry is with Boaz, trailing in the series 23–44–4. Sardis football currently holds five region championships in 1975, 1985, 1988, 2011, and 2017. The team reached its first playoff appearance in 1975 and secured its first playoff win in 1988. Since, SHS has had 16 playoff appearances.

Basketball: The Sardis High School boys basketball team competes in Class 5A of AHSAA. The team is coached by Van Owens who holds a 113–116 record. The longest serving head basketball coach in school history is Tracy Cheek who served from 2003–2014. The team currently holds three area championships in 2007, 2018, and 2024. The Sardis High School boys basketball team currently holds one AHSAA district and state championship in 1936.

Baseball: The Sardis High School baseball team competes in Class 5A of AHSAA. The team is coached by Kevin Vinson who has served from 2018–present. The team was first established in 1934. Sardis baseball currently holds eleven area championships in 1986, 1987, 1995, 1999, 2009, 2010, 2017, 2018, 2021, 2022, and 2023. The team has had multiple playoff appearances, making it to the Elite 8 in 1987 and 2018 and the Final Four in 1986, and 2023.

Girls Basketball: The Sardis High School girls basketball team competes in Class 5A of AHSAA. The team was organized in 1978. The team is coached by Heath Cullom who holds a 71–34 record. The longest serving head girls basketball coach in school history is Kenneth Jones who served from 1985–1997. Sardis girls basketball currently holds four area championships in 1986, 1995, 2022, and 2023. The team also reached the Elite 8 playoff round in 2022.

Softball: The Sardis High School softball team competes in Class 5A of AHSAA. The team is coached by Richey Lee who has served from 2015–present. Sardis High softball currently holds six area championships in 2013, 2015, 2016, 2019, 2021, and 2022. The team has multiple playoff appearances, making it to the Elite 8 rounds in 2011, 2013, 2019, and 2021.

Girls Tennis: The Sardis High School girls tennis team currently holds seven sectional championships in 2016, 2017, 2018, 2019, 2021, 2022, and 2023.
