= Isaac Haas =

American basketball player

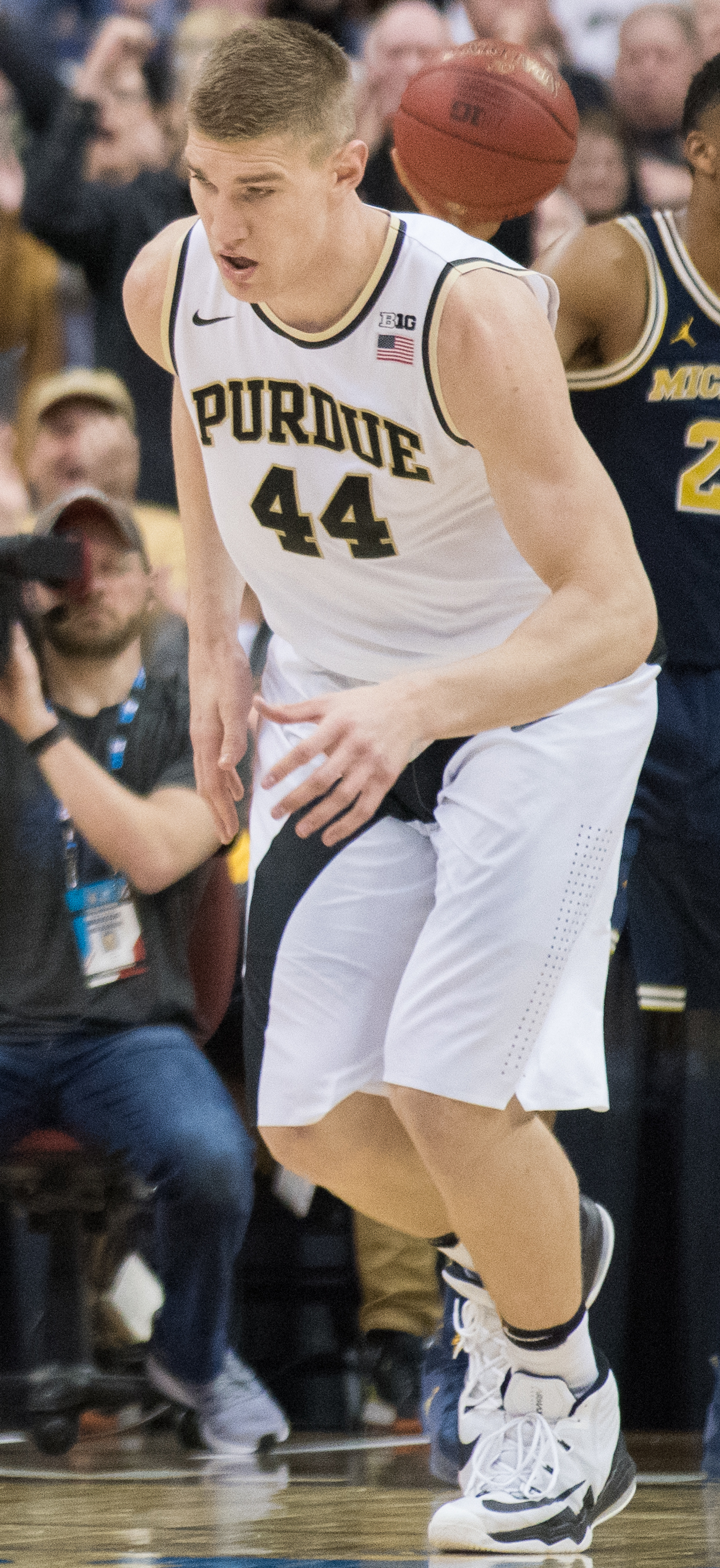
- Haas playing for Purdue

Personal information
- Born: October 2, 1995 (age 31) Birmingham, Alabama, U.S.
- Listed height: 7 ft 2 in (2.18 m)
- Listed weight: 295 lb (134 kg)

Career information
- High school: Hokes Bluff (Hokes Bluff, Alabama)
- College: Purdue (2014–2018)
- NBA draft: 2018: undrafted
- Playing career: 2018–2024
- Position: Center

Career history
- 2018–2020: Salt Lake City Stars
- 2020–2021: Guangzhou Loong Lions
- 2021–2023: Beijing Royal Fighters

Career highlights
- Third-team All-Big Ten (2018)
- Stats at Basketball Reference
Medals
Men's basketball
Representing United States
Summer Universiade
| Silver medal – second place | 2017 Taipei | Team competition |

Isaac Haas (born October 2, 1995) is an American former professional basketball player who last played for the Beijing Royal Fighters of the Chinese Basketball Association (CBA). He played college basketball for the Purdue Boilermakers.

== High school career ==
Haas is the son of Rachel and Danny Haas and grew up in Hokes Bluff, Alabama. He attended Hokes Bluff High School and averaged 18.5 points and 11 rebounds as a junior. Haas committed to Purdue on November 18, 2013. Haas' primary reason for committing to Purdue was due to the university's ability to develop its tall players, saying "It's great exposure, and under Matt Painter, almost every 7-footer who went to Purdue went to the NBA." Haas, who originally committed to Wake Forest, was a four star and top 100 recruit.

== College career ==
Haas began his collegiate career entering games with much energy but tiring easily. He was a backup to A. J. Hammons for his first two years as he improved his conditioning. As a sophomore, Haas averaged 9.8 points and 3.8 rebounds per game.

As a junior, Haas was named a Big Ten Honorable Mention by the coaches and media. He averaged 12.6 points and 5.7 rebounds per game playing alongside Caleb Swanigan in the frontcourt. Haas and Vincent Edwards declared for the 2017 NBA Draft, but also did not sign with an agent. On May 16, 2017, Haas announced he would withdraw from the NBA Draft.

As a senior, Haas was named to the preseason watchlist of the Kareem Abdul-Jabbar award. He was named Big Ten player of the week on December 4, after scoring a career high 26 points, including the go-ahead bucket with 43 seconds left, versus Northwestern. He also had 21 points and four blocks to lead the Boilermakers to a win against Maryland. Haas scored 15 points in 16 minutes in Purdue's 82–67 win over Butler on December 16, but was limited by four fouls. He was named third-team All-Big Ten. In the first round of the NCAA Tournament against Cal State Fullerton, Haas fractured his elbow and ended his career at Purdue. On May 17, during the 2018 NBA Draft Combine, it revealed that Haas was not only the tallest player at the event that year, being near 7'3" in shoes, but he was also the heaviest player at the event at 303 pounds.

=== College career statistics ===
Cited from Sports Reference.

| College | Year | GP | MPG | FG% | FT% | RPG | APG | SPG | BPG | PPG |
|---|---|---|---|---|---|---|---|---|---|---|
| Purdue | 2014–15 | 34 | 14.6 | .535 | .713 | 4.1 | 0.3 | 0.1 | 0.7 | 7.6 |
| Purdue | 2015–16 | 35 | 14.3 | .594 | .713 | 3.7 | 0.5 | 0.1 | 0.8 | 9.8 |
| Purdue | 2016–17 | 35 | 19.5 | .587 | .781 | 5.0 | 0.6 | 0.3 | 0.7 | 12.6 |
| Purdue | 2017–18 | 25 | 22.4 | .615 | .781 | 5.7 | 0.8 | 0.2 | 1.3 | 14.5 |

== Professional career ==
=== Salt Lake City Stars (2018–2020) ===
After going undrafted in the 2018 NBA draft Haas signed with Utah Jazz to join their Summer League team. On October 13, 2018, Haas was waived by the Jazz. He was subsequently added to the roster of their G League affiliate, the Salt Lake City Stars. On October 29, 2019, Haas was included in training camp roster of the Salt Lake City Stars, and on November 8, 2019, Haas was included in opening night roster of the Salt Lake City Stars. On March 2, 2020, Haas contributed 14 points and 12 rebounds in a win over the South Bay Lakers.

=== Guangzhou Loong Lions (2020–2021) ===
On October 17, 2020, Haas signed with Guangzhou Loong Lions.

=== Beijing Royal Fighters (2021–2023) ===
On October 21, 2021, Haas signed with Beijing Royal Fighters.

== National team career ==
Haas was a part of the Purdue team chosen to represent the United States in the 2017 Summer Universiade in Taipei, Taiwan. The U.S. received a silver medal after losing in the title game to Lithuania, with Haas contributing 17 points in the loss.

== Personal life ==
In April 2018, Haas was sued after being accused of lying about having a sexually transmitted disease and subsequently infecting a partner with herpes. The lawsuit, against both Haas and Purdue University, was dismissed in 2022.
