= Hokes Bluff High School =

Location
- 1865 Appalachian Highway; Hokes Bluff, Alabama 35903; United States; 34°00′46″N 85°52′09″W

Information
- Type: Public high school
- Established: 1935 (91 years ago)
- School district: Etowah County Schools
- Superintendent: Alan Cosby
- CEEB code: 011200
- Principal: Scott Calhoun
- Staff: 21.25 (FTE)
- Grades: 9-12
- Enrollment: 371 (2024-2025)
- Student to teacher ratio: 17.46
- Colors: Green and white
- Team name: Eagles
- Rival: Glencoe High School
- Website: hbhs.ecboe.org

Hokes Bluff High School is a public high school in Hokes Bluff, Alabama, United States. It is a part of Etowah County Schools.

== History ==
Hokes Bluff High School was created in 1935.

== Athletics ==
The following sports are offered at Hokes Bluff:

- Baseball
- Basketball
- Bowling
- Cross country
- Football
- Golf
- Softball
- Track and field
- Volleyball

== Facilities ==
The campus of Hokes Bluff High School consists of a 32,000 square foot main building with one gym and an agriculture building along with baseball, football and softball fields.

== Notable alumni ==
- George Herring (1951), NFL player
- Steve Shields (1977), MLB player
- Mark Gidley (1980), member of the Alabama House of Representatives
- Drake White (2001), country music singer
- Isaac Haas (2014), NBA G League basketball player
- Tylynn Register (2016), professional wrestler for WWE as "Lainey Reid"
