= West End High School (Walnut Grove, Alabama) =

Location
- 4515 Elm Street; Walnut Grove, Alabama 35990; United States; 34°03′49″N 86°18′09″W

Information
- Type: Public high school
- Established: 1966 (60 years ago)
- School district: Etowah County Schools
- Superintendent: Alan Cosby
- CEEB code: 012790
- Principal: David Lockridge
- Staff: 20.92 (FTE)
- Grades: 7-12
- Enrollment: 365 (2023-2024)
- Student to teacher ratio: 17.45
- Colors: Red, white and blue
- Team name: West End Walnut Grove Patriots
- Website: wehs.ecboe.org

West End High School is a public high school in Walnut Grove, Alabama, United States. It is a part of Etowah County Schools.

== History ==
West End High School was established in the summer of 1966 after the consolidation of Altoona High School and Walnut Grove High School.

== Education ==
According to state test scores, 37% of students are at least proficient in math and 37% in reading.

== Athletics ==
The following sports are offered at West End:

- Baseball
- Basketball
- Football
- Softball
- Volleyball
- Cross Country
- Track and Field
