= Dakota Mathias =

American basketball player (born 1995)

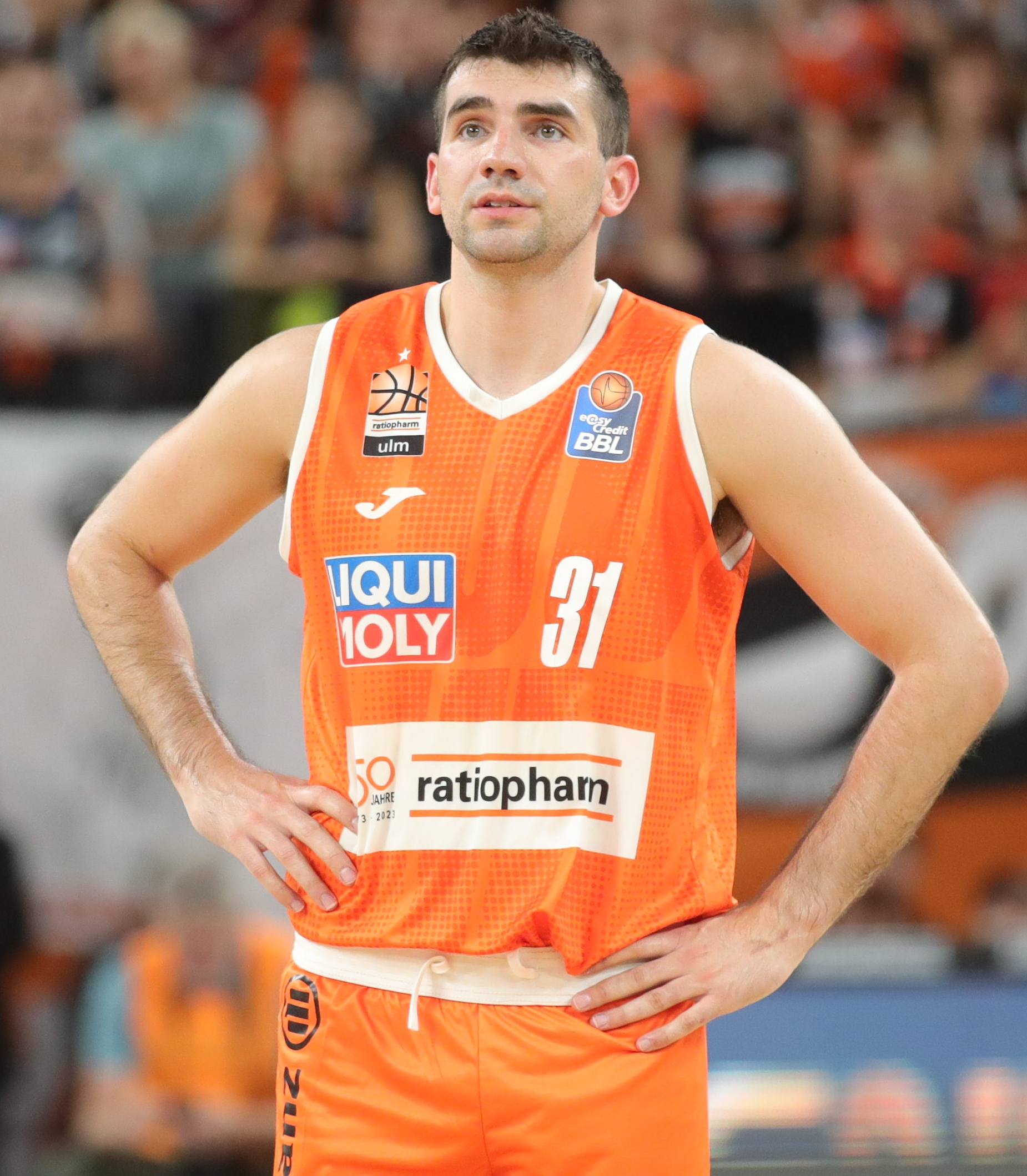
- Mathias with ratiopharm Ulm in 2023

No. 31 – Tasmania JackJumpers
- Position: Shooting guard
- League: NBL

Personal information
- Born: July 11, 1995 (age 31) Elida, Ohio, U.S.
- Listed height: 6 ft 4 in (1.93 m)
- Listed weight: 200 lb (91 kg)

Career information
- High school: Elida (Elida, Ohio)
- College: Purdue (2014–2018)
- NBA draft: 2018: undrafted
- Playing career: 2018–present

Career history
- 2018–2019: Joventut
- 2019–2020: Texas Legends
- 2020–2021: Philadelphia 76ers
- 2021–2022: Memphis Grizzlies
- 2022: Texas Legends
- 2022–2023: Memphis Hustle
- 2023: Lenovo Tenerife
- 2023–2024: ratiopharm Ulm
- 2024–2025: Indiana Mad Ants
- 2025: Brisbane Bullets
- 2026: Noblesville Boom
- 2026–present: Tasmania JackJumpers
- Stats at NBA.com
- Stats at Basketball Reference
Medals
Men's basketball
Representing the United States
Summer Universiade
Silver medal – second place	2017 Taipei	Team

Dakota Daniel Mathias (born July 11, 1995) is an American professional basketball player for the Tasmania JackJumpers of the Australian National Basketball League (NBL). He played college basketball for the Purdue Boilermakers.

== High school career ==
Mathias was a star basketball player at Elida High School. He entered the starting lineup as a freshman and scored over 1,000 points and broke the school scoring record with 1,902. Mathias scored 28 points a game as a senior at Elida and was First Team All-Ohio twice. He committed to Purdue in November 2013.

== College career ==
He averaged 4.8 points and 2.1 rebounds per game as a freshman but shot just 32.2 percent from three-point range. As a junior, Mathias averaged 9.7 points a game, led the team in three-pointers and started every game. He developed a reputation as a coach on the floor, with players frequently going to him if they did not understand something basketball-related. He was an All-Big Ten Honorable Mention and was named to the conference Defensive Team.

As a senior, Mathias evolved into one of the best defensive players in the Big Ten Conference. He scored 23 points against Fairfield on November 29, 2017. In the Round of 32 of the NCAA Tournament, he hit the critical 3-pointer with 13 seconds remaining that decided Purdue's 76–73 victory over Butler. As a senior, he averaged 12.0 points, 4.1 rebounds and 3.9 assists per game on a 30–7 squad. Mathias finished sixth in the NCAA in three-point field goal percentage at 46.6 percent and owns the Purdue record for career threes with 250. He was again an All-Big Ten Honorable Mention and named to the conference Defensive Team.

== Professional career ==
=== Joventut (2018–2019) ===
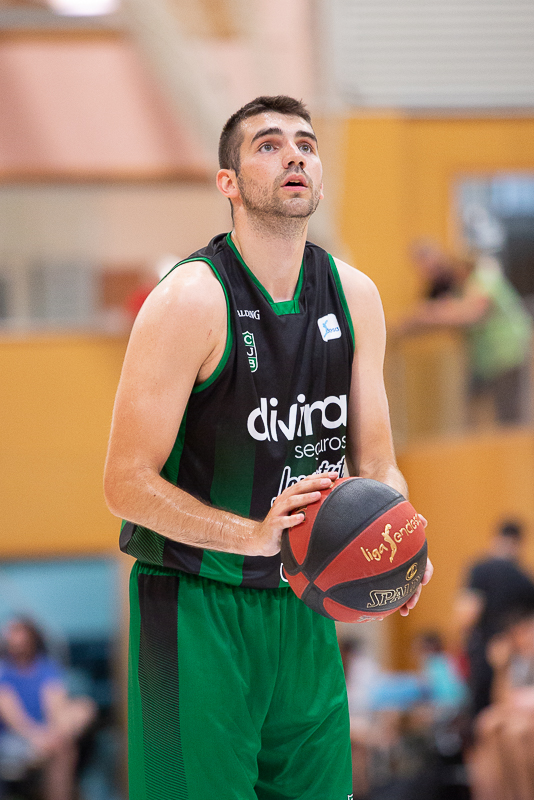
Mathias with Joventut in 2018

After going undrafted in the 2018 NBA draft, Mathias signed a partially guaranteed contract with the Cleveland Cavaliers, joining the team for Summer League. On August 1, 2018, he signed with Divina Seguros Joventut of the Liga ACB in Spain. After an ankle injury that sidelined him between October and December, some pain remained which prevented him from playing regularly, and on March 3, 2019, he and the club agreed to cancel their contract.

=== Texas Legends (2019–2020) ===
On July 26, 2019, Mathias signed a training camp contract with the Dallas Mavericks. He was waived on October 16, 2019, but later added to the roster of the Mavs' NBA G League affiliate, the Texas Legends. He scored 30 points in a win over Sioux Falls Skyforce on November 27. Mathias scored 30 points in a victory over the Oklahoma City Blue on December 9. Mathias averaged 18.1 points, 4.7 rebounds, 3 assists and a steal per game.

=== Philadelphia 76ers (2020–2021) ===
On December 3, 2020, Mathias signed a two-way contract with the Philadelphia 76ers, splitting time with their G League affiliate the Delaware Blue Coats. He was waived on January 18, 2021, after averaging 6.0 points and 1.6 assists per game in eight games.

=== Memphis Grizzlies / Texas Legends (2021–2022) ===
On December 30, 2021, Mathias signed a 10-day contract with the Memphis Grizzlies via the hardship exception.

On January 9, 2022, Mathias was reacquired by the Texas Legends.

On January 14, 2022, Mathias signed a 10-day contract with the Memphis Grizzlies.

On January 24, 2022, Mathias was reacquired by the Texas Legends. On February 10, he was waived.

=== Memphis Hustle (2022–2023) ===
Mathias joined the Memphis Grizzlies for the 2022 NBA Summer League. On November 4, 2022, Mathias was named to the opening-night roster for the Memphis Hustle.

=== Lenovo Tenerife (2023) ===
On April 6, 2023, Mathias signed with Lenovo Tenerife of the Liga ACB.

=== ratiopharm Ulm (2023–2024) ===
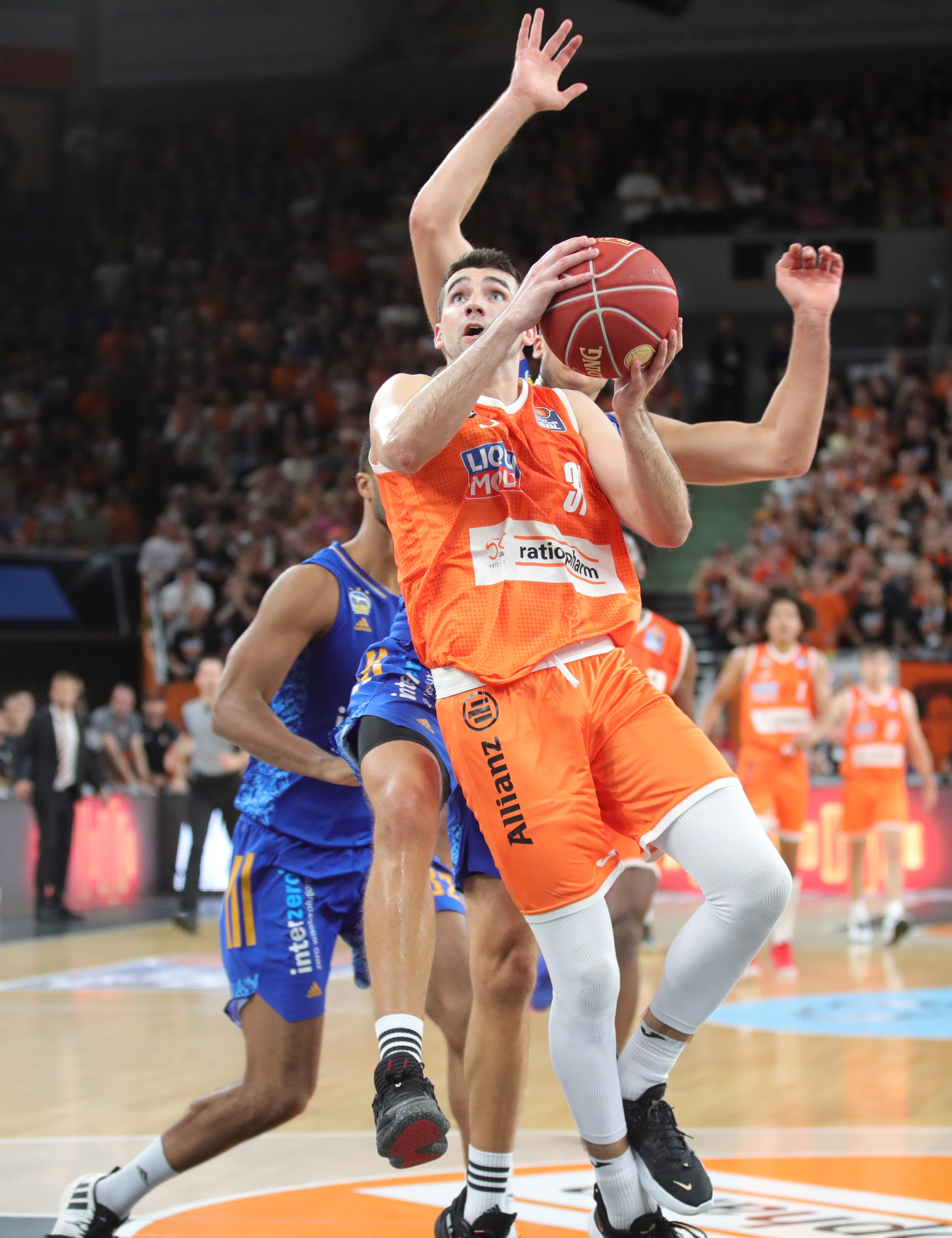
Mathias with ratiopharm Ulm in 2023

On August 1, 2023, Mathias signed with ratiopharm Ulm of the Basketball Bundesliga.

=== Indiana Mad Ants (2024–2025) ===
On August 26, 2024, Mathias signed with the Indiana Pacers, but was waived three days later. On October 27, he joined the Indiana Mad Ants.

=== Brisbane Bullets (2025) ===
On October 24, 2025, Mathias signed with the Brisbane Bullets of the Australian National Basketball League (NBL) for the rest of the 2025–26 season. On December 14, he was ruled out for six to eight weeks with a fractured scapula. He subsequently returned home later that month due to the injury. He averaged 11.8 points per game with the Bullets.

=== Noblesville Boom (2026) ===
On March 4, 2026, Mathias was acquired by the Noblesville Boom of the NBA G League. In nine games to finish the 2025–26 NBA G League season, he averaged 21.9 points, 4.0 rebounds, 4.2 assists and 1.3 steals per game.

=== Tasmania JackJumpers (2026–present) ===
On June 22, 2026, Mathias signed with the Tasmania JackJumpers for the 2026–27 NBL season. Following a nose injury suffered in round 3, Mathias went under anaesthesia for a procedure and subsequently started wearing a protective mask.

== National team career ==
Mathias was a part of the Purdue team chosen to represent the United States in the 2017 Summer Universiade in Taipei, Taiwan. The U.S. received a silver medal after losing in the title game to Lithuania.

In 2021, Mathias joined the national team to compete in the Americup qualifiers.

== Personal life ==
Mathias is the son of Dan and Tracy, and he has two brothers, Dustin and Bo.

== Career statistics ==
Legend
GP	Games played	GS	Games started	MPG	Minutes per game
FG%	Field goal percentage	3P%	3-point field goal percentage	FT%	Free throw percentage
RPG	Rebounds per game	APG	Assists per game	SPG	Steals per game
BPG	Blocks per game	PPG	Points per game	**Bold**	Career high

=== NBA ===
==== Regular season ====
Year	Team	GP	GS	MPG	FG%	3P%	FT%	RPG	APG	SPG	BPG	PPG
2020–21	Philadelphia	**8**	**2**	**15.4**	**.396**	.308	**.333**	**.9**	**1.6**	.1	**.4**	**6.0**
2021–22	Memphis	6	0	2.7	.333	**.333**	.000	.3	.2	**.2**	.0	1.0
Career		14	2	9.9	.389	.313	.500	.6	1.0	.1	.2	3.9

=== College ===
Year	Team	GP	GS	MPG	FG%	3P%	FT%	RPG	APG	SPG	BPG	PPG
2014–15	Purdue	34	17	19.6	.327	.322	.710	2.1	1.4	.5	.1	4.8
2015–16	Purdue	35	5	19.0	.408	.386	**.864**	2.2	2.3	.3	.1	5.5
2016–17	Purdue	35	35	**31.7**	.470	.453	.821	3.9	3.8	.9	.1	9.7
2017–18	Purdue	**37**	**37**	31.4	**.472**	**.466**	.825	**4.1**	**3.9**	**1.2**	**.2**	**12.0**
Career		141	94	25.6	.434	.419	.805	3.1	2.9	.7	.1	8.1
