= Etowah County Schools =

School district in Alabama, United States

Address
- 401 Broad Street Etowah County, Alabama; United States

District information
- NCES District ID: 0101380

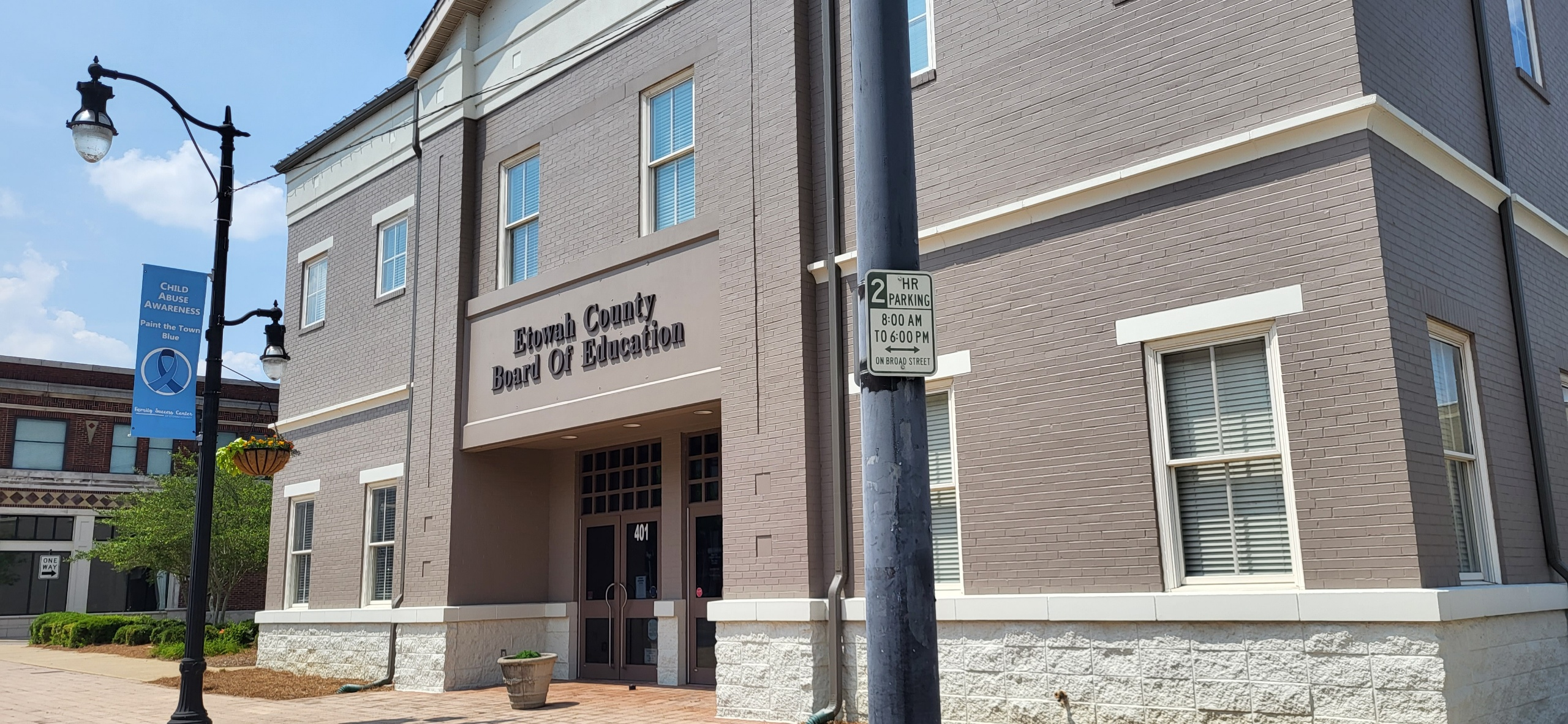
The Etowah County Schools headquarters (and the seat of the Etowah County Board of Education) are located at 401 Broad Street in the Gadsden city limits

Etowah County Schools is a school district in Etowah County, Alabama. The district is run by the Etowah County Board of Education. The Etowah County Board of Education consists of seven board members.

The district covers areas in the county not in the city limits of Attalla, Boaz, nor Gadsden. The school district headquarters are within the Gadsden city limits.

== Etowah County Board of Education ==
- Mr. Tim Womack- Board Member
- Mrs. Scarlett Farley- Board Member
- Mr. Jay Freeman- Board President
- Mr. Danny Golden- Board Member
- Mr. Tim Langdale- Board Vice President
- Mrs. Susan Spiker- Board Member
- Mr. Doug Sherrod- Board Member

The Etowah County Board of Education superintendent is Dr. Alan Cosby.

== History ==
In 1959 this district and the Attalla City Schools school district came to an agreement, signed by the two parties, that the county district would keep operating what was then called Etowah County High School while the county would help build Alma Hinson Junior High School. The two districts, under said agreement, sent students to each other's schools.

In April 1975, the city district sought to get control of the high school. In May the Attalla district filed a lawsuit to try to make the Etowah County district give up the high school. Attalla then changed its lawsuit so it would also take control of the Etowah Area Vocational School. By then, both schools were in the Attalla city limits.

Roy Mayhall, a circuit judge, said that the county district should continue to operate those two schools. The case was appealed to the Alabama Supreme Court. In June 1975, a member of the Alabama House of Representatives from the county, Kerry Rich, filed a bill proposing that if a county-based school district's vocational school located in the limits of that city has most of its students within the county-based school district, that city-based school district cannot take control of that county vocational school. This bill would have meant that the Attalla school district would be unable to take the vocational school from the county district. By June 1976 the two school districts were trying to find a settlement to the issue. That month, the board of trustees of the county school district voted to give the high school to the city district with conditions, with four board members voting in favor and two voting against.

Roy Mayhall, a circuit judge, said that the county district should continue to operate those two schools. The case was appealed to the Alabama Supreme Court. In June 1975, a member of the Alabama House of Representatives from the county, Kerry Rich, filed a bill proposing that if a county-based school district's vocational school located in the limits of that city has most of its students within the county-based school district, that city-based school district cannot take control of that county vocational school. This bill would have meant that the Attalla school district would be unable to take the vocational school from the county district.

By June 1976 the two school districts were trying to find a settlement to the issue. That month, the board of trustees of the county school district voted to give the high school to the city district with conditions, with four board members voting in favor and two voting against. The city district took control of the high school in July 1976.

== Schools ==
=== Elementary schools ===
- Carlisle Elementary School
- Duck Springs Elementary School
- Gaston Elementary School
- Glencoe Elementary School
- Highland Elementary School
- Hokes Bluff Elementary School
- Ivalee Elementary School
- John S. Jones Elementary School
- Southside Elementary School
- Walnut Park Elementary School
- West End Elementary School
- Whitesboro Elementary School

=== Middle schools ===
- Glencoe Middle School
- Hokes Bluff Middle School
- Rainbow Middle School
- Sardis Middle School

=== High schools ===
- Gaston School
- Glencoe High School
- Hokes Bluff High School
- Sardis High School
- Southside High School
- West End High School
- The Learning Center
- Career Technical Center

=== Former schools ===
- Etowah County High School (given to the city school district in July 1976)
