= Hokes Bluff =

City in Alabama, United States

- City
- Location of Hokes Bluff in Etowah County, Alabama.
- Coordinates: 34°00′N 85°52′W
- Country: United States
- State: Alabama
- County: Etowah

Area
  - Total: 12.09 sq mi (31.32 km^{2})
  - Land: 11.93 sq mi (30.90 km^{2})
  - Water: 0.16 sq mi (0.42 km^{2})
- Elevation: 587 ft (179 m)

Population (2020)
  - Total: 4,446
  - Density: 372.7/sq mi (143.91/km^{2})
- Time zone: UTC-6 (Central (CST))
  - Summer (DST): UTC-5 (CDT)
- ZIP code: 35903
- Area code(s): 256 and 938
- FIPS code: 01-35392
- GNIS feature ID: 2404710
- Website: www.cityofhokesbluff.com

Hokes Bluff is a city in Etowah County, Alabama, United States. It is part of the Gadsden Metropolitan Statistical Area. At the 2020 census, its population was 4,446.

== History ==
Hokes Bluff was established on a high bluff overlooking the Coosa River. The town was called "The Bluff", and was used as a lookout station by Native American tribes, as they could see a great distance across, up and down the Coosa River. Hokes Bluff was one of the staging areas where the Cherokee were collected, and sent to Gunter's Landing (Guntersville), and west to Oklahoma on the Trail of Tears.

Settlers came into the area in the 1840s. Daniel Hoke Jr. was among the settlers, who came in 1850 and built a trading post and a blacksmith shop near the site of the bluff. The town was renamed "Hoke's Bluff" after him in 1853 by W.B. Wynne, a friend of Hoke. The town was raided and pillaged during the Civil War by raiding parties of both sides of the Union and the Confederacy. John Henry Wisdom, who became the "Paul Revere of the Confederacy" after making his famous ride from Gadsden to Rome during the Civil War, was a resident of Hokes Bluff.

A new mail route was established from Gadsden to Hokes Bluff in 1890. Before it was established, Hokes Bluff had poor mail service, receiving most mail by steamboat. The post office was established in 1877 and discontinued in 1931.

One legend associated with the town is about Tawannah Springs, the town's water supply. It is said that the springs are named for a Native American princess (Tawannah) who grieved herself to death after her cousin, Princess Noccalula, jumped herself to death at Noccalula Falls in Gadsden.

Hokes Bluff was incorporated in 1946 with a population of 1,200. W.B. Ford was the first mayor. In 1949, a water system was installed with a 75,000 gallon reservoir and 54 hydrants. In 1953, gas was installed in the town, and in 1956, the streets were paved.

== Geography ==
Hokes Bluff is located in eastern Etowah County and is bordered to the west by the cities of Gadsden (the county seat) and Glencoe, and to the northwest by the Coosa River. U.S. Route 278 passes through the city, leading west 9 miles (14 km) to the center of Gadsden, and east 15 miles (24 km) to Piedmont.

According to the U.S. Census Bureau, the city of Hokes Bluff has a total area of 12.1 square miles (31.4 km^{2}), of which 11.9 square miles (30.9 km^{2}) is land and 0.2 square miles (0.4 km^{2}), or 1.35%, is water.

== Demographics ==
Historical population
Census	Pop.	Note	%±
1950	1,158		—
1960	1,619		39.8%
1970	2,133		31.7%
1980	3,216		50.8%
1990	3,739		16.3%
2000	4,149		11.0%
2010	4,286		3.3%
2020	4,446		3.7%
U.S. Decennial Census

=== Racial and ethnic composition ===
Hokes Bluff city, Alabama – Racial and ethnic composition Note: the US Census treats Hispanic/Latino as an ethnic category. This table excludes Latinos from the racial categories and assigns them to a separate category. Hispanics/Latinos may be of any race.
Race / Ethnicity (NH = Non-Hispanic)	Pop 1980	Pop 1990	Pop 2000	Pop 2010	Pop 2020	% 1980	% 1990	% 2000	% 2010	% 2020
White alone (NH)	3,216	3,721	4,089	4,217	4,175	100.00%	99.52%	98.55%	98.39%	93.90%
Black or African American alone (NH)	0	0	4	15	57	0.00%	0.00%	0.10%	0.35%	1.28%
Native American or Alaska Native alone (NH)	0	5	9	6	15	0.00%	0.13%	0.22%	0.14%	0.34%
Asian alone (NH)	0	2	3	18	14	0.00%	0.05%	0.07%	0.42%	0.31%
Native Hawaiian or Pacific Islander alone (NH)	x	x	0	0	2	x	x	0.00%	0.00%	0.04%
Other race alone (NH)	0	0	9	0	10	0.00%	0.00%	0.22%	0.00%	0.22%
Mixed race or Multiracial (NH)	x	x	16	20	127	x	x	0.39%	0.47%	2.86%
Hispanic or Latino (any race)	0	11	19	10	46	0.00%	0.29%	0.46%	0.23%	1.03%
Total	3,216	3,739	4,149	4,286	4,446	100.00%	100.00%	100.00%	100.00%	100.00%

=== 2020 census ===
As of the 2020 United States census, there were 4,446 people, 1,610 households, and 1,046 families residing in the city.

=== 2010 census ===
At the 2010 census there were 4,286 people in 1,747 households, including 1,287 families, in the city. The population density was 351.6 inhabitants per square mile (135.8/km^{2}). There were 1,846 housing units at an average density of 156.4 per square mile (60.4/km^{2}). The racial makeup of the city was 98.5% White, 0.3% Black or African American, 0.1% Native American, 0.4% Asian, 0.1% from other races, and 0.5% from two or more races. 0.2% of the population were Hispanic or Latino of any race. Of the 1,747 households 28.4% had children under the age of 18 living with them, 60.2% were married couples living together, 9.9% had a female householder with no husband present, and 26.3% were non-families. 23.8% of households were one person and 11.7% were one person aged 65 or older. The average household size was 2.45 and the average family size was 2.88.

The age distribution was 21.7% under the age of 18, 6.6% from 18 to 24, 26.0% from 25 to 44, 28.3% from 45 to 64, and 17.4% 65 or older. The median age was 42.3 years. For every 100 females, there were 94.9 males. For every 100 females age 18 and over, there were 97.7 males.

The median household income was $54,668 and the median family income was $67,857. Males had a median income of $47,424 versus $34,288 for females. The per capita income for the city was $26,375. About 1.6% of families and 4.1% of the population were below the poverty line, including 10.3% of those under age 18 and 1.9% of those age 65 or over.

=== 2000 census ===
At the 2000 census there were 4,149 people in 1,638 households, including 1,272 families, in the city. The population density was 357.0 inhabitants per square mile (137.8/km^{2}). There were 1,721 housing units at an average density of 148.1 per square mile (57.2/km^{2}). The racial makeup of the city was 98.99% White, 0.10% Black or African American, 0.22% Native American, 0.07% Asian, 0.24% from other races, and 0.39% from two or more races. 0.46% of the population were Hispanic or Latino of any race. Of the 1,638 households 32.1% had children under the age of 18 living with them, 67.6% were married couples living together, 7.3% had a female householder with no husband present, and 22.3% were non-families. 20.9% of households were one person and 11.1% were one person aged 65 or older. The average household size was 2.53 and the average family size was 2.93.

The age distribution was 22.9% under the age of 18, 7.1% from 18 to 24, 28.0% from 25 to 44, 26.7% from 45 to 64, and 15.3% 65 or older. The median age was 40 years. For every 100 females, there were 93.7 males. For every 100 females age 18 and over, there were 89.2 males.

The median household income was $37,923 and the median family income was $42,534. Males had a median income of $32,444 versus $26,513 for females. The per capita income for the city was $17,476. About 3.8% of families and 4.3% of the population were below the poverty line, including 6.0% of those under age 18 and 1.7% of those age 65 or over.

== Transportation ==
Etowah County Rural Transportation provides dial-a-ride bus service throughout the city and county.

== Notable people ==
- Cody Dennison, racing driver and YouTuber
- Isaac Haas, basketball player
- Linda Howard, author
- Steve Shields, former professional baseball player
- Drake White, country music singer
