= Isaiah Livers =

American basketball player (born 1998)

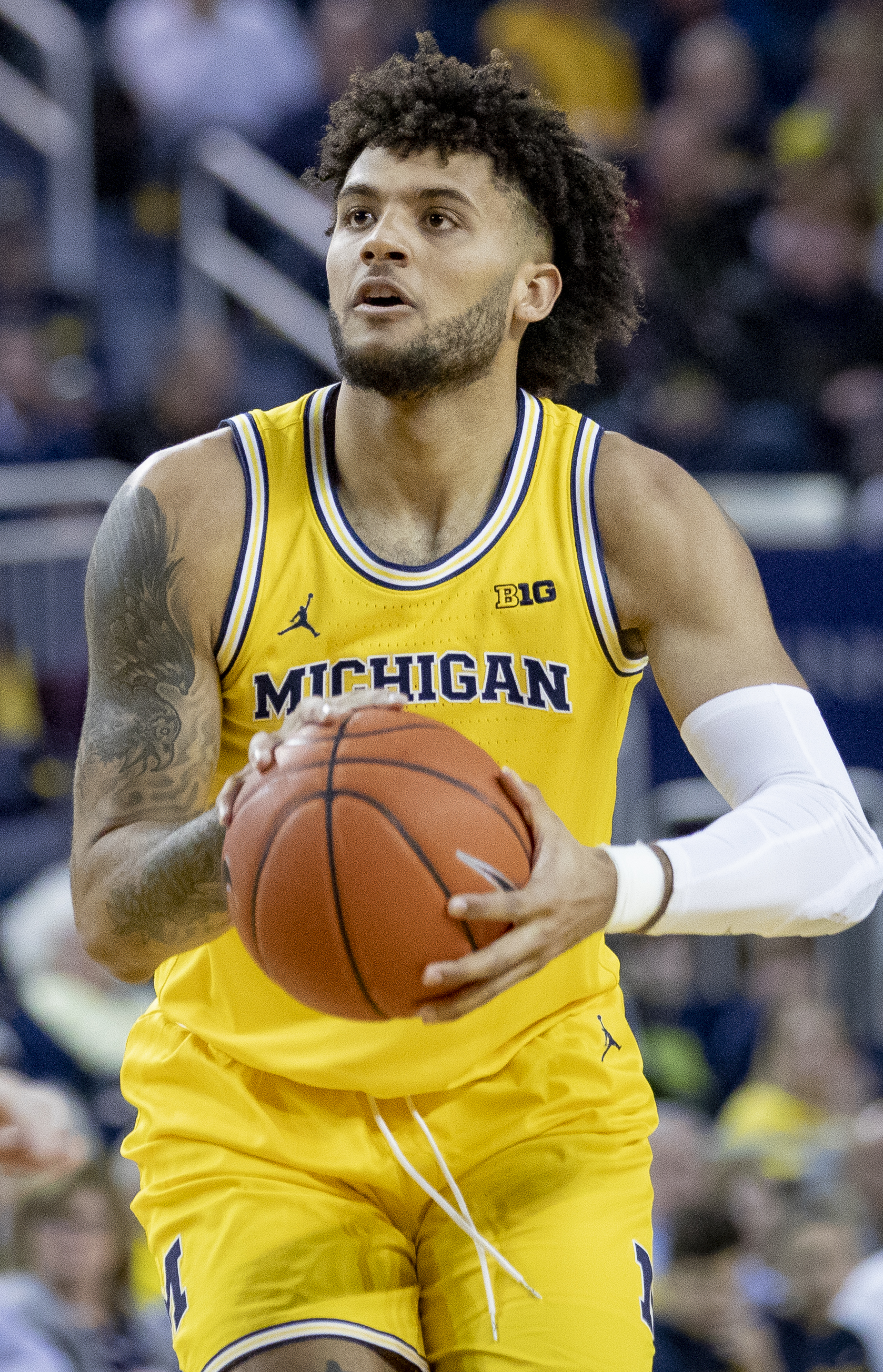
- Livers with Michigan in 2020

No. 2 – Yokohama B-Corsairs
- Position: Power forward / small forward
- League: B.League

Personal information
- Born: July 28, 1998 (age 28) Kalamazoo, Michigan, U.S.
- Listed height: 6 ft 6 in (1.98 m)
- Listed weight: 232 lb (105 kg)

Career information
- High school: Kalamazoo Central (Kalamazoo, Michigan)
- College: Michigan (2017–2021)
- NBA draft: 2021: 2nd round, 42nd overall pick
- Drafted by: Detroit Pistons
- Playing career: 2021–present

Career history
- 2021–2024: Detroit Pistons
- 2021–2022: →Motor City Cruise
- 2025–2026: Phoenix Suns
- 2025–2026: →Valley Suns
- 2026–present: Yokohama B-Corsairs

Career highlights
- Second-team All-Big Ten (2021); Mr. Basketball of Michigan (2017)
- Stats at NBA.com
- Stats at Basketball Reference

Isaiah Maurice Livers (/ˈlɪvərz/ LIH-vərz; born July 28, 1998) is an American professional basketball player for the Yokohama B-Corsairs of the B.League. He played college basketball for the Michigan Wolverines. He attended Kalamazoo Central High School where he won the Mr. Basketball of Michigan. He was part of the 2017–18 team that won the 2018 Big Ten Conference men's basketball tournament and reached the championship game of the 2018 NCAA Division I men's basketball tournament.

== Early life ==
Livers was born on July 28, 1998, in Kalamazoo, Michigan, to Angela and Morris Livers. He started playing basketball at the age of five with his father in the driveway. Michigan began recruiting Livers in May 2016 and he made his official visit on July 28, earning an offer. At the end of his recruitment, he was considering visiting Cal, but decided to cancel the visit and commit to Michigan. On August 7, 2016, Livers committed to Michigan over contenders Michigan State, Butler, Minnesota, California, and Boston College. Livers signed his National Letter of Intent to Michigan as part of a three-scholarship player incoming class with Jordan Poole and Eli Brooks.

He was named 2017 Michigan Gatorade Player of the Year and Mr. Basketball of Michigan. Livers edged out second-place finisher Xavier Tillman by a 2,811–2,739 vote margin, although Tillman received three more first-place ballots. It was the closest vote in Mr. Basketball of Michigan history. Livers was Michigan's 11th Mr. Basketball of Michigan, but the first since Manny Harris in 2007.

College recruiting
Name	Hometown	School	Height	Weight	Commit date
Isaiah Livers; PF	Kalamazoo, MI	Kalamazoo Central (MI)	6 ft 8 in (2.03 m)	210 lb (95 kg)	Aug 7, 2016
Isaiah Livers; PF	Recruit ratings: Scout: Rivals: 247Sports: ESPN:				
Overall recruit ranking: Scout: 68, 14 (PF) Rivals: 86 ESPN: 41 (PF), 14 (CA)
Note: In many cases, Scout, Rivals, 247Sports, On3, and ESPN may conflict in their listings of height and weight.; In these cases, the average was taken. ESPN grades are on a 100-point scale.; Sources: "Michigan 2017 Basketball Commitments". Rivals.; "2017 Michigan Basketball Commits". Scout.; "ESPN". ESPN.; "Scout.com Team Recruiting Rankings". Scout.; "2017 Team Ranking". Rivals.

== College career ==
=== Freshman season (2017–2018) ===
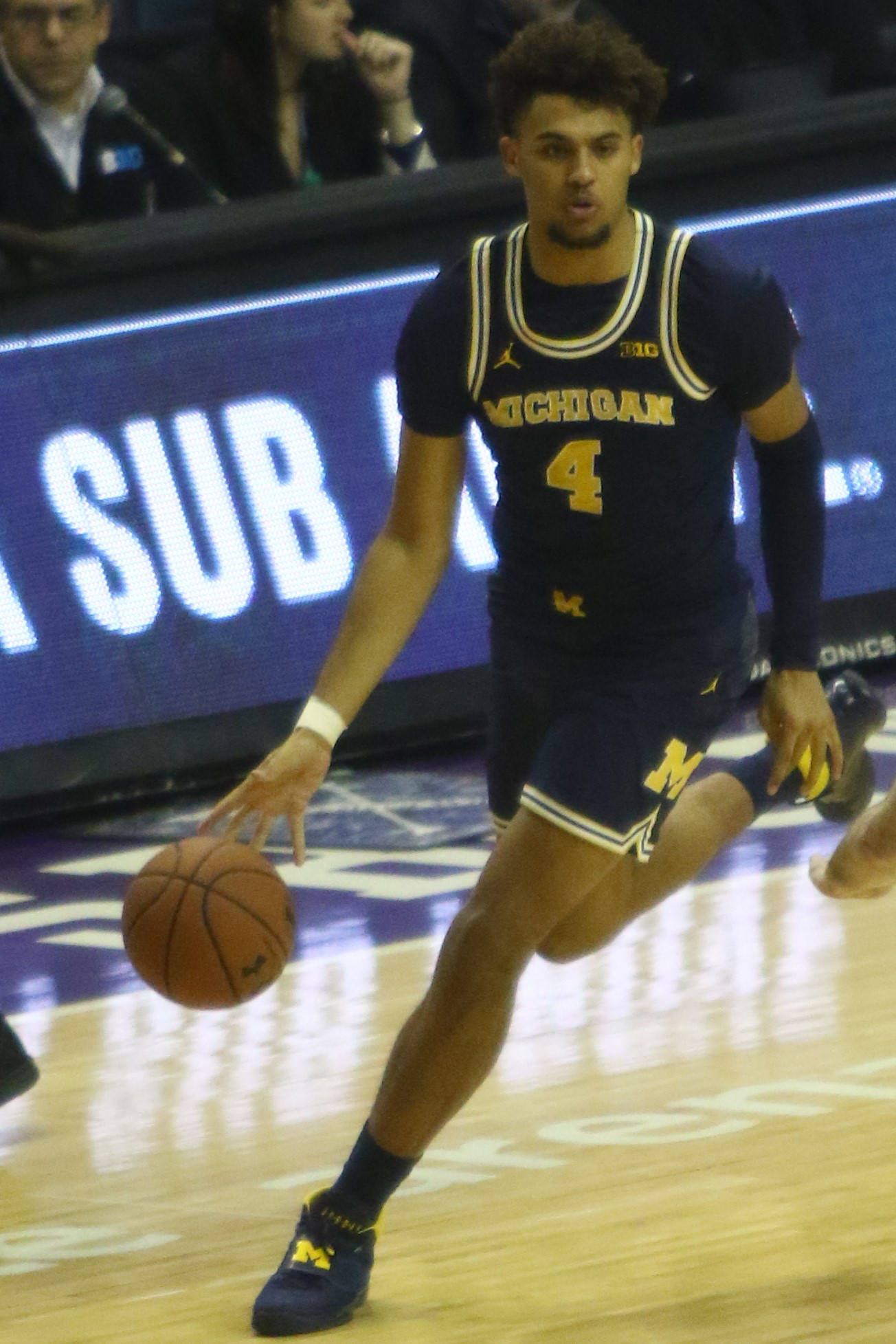
Livers for the 2017–18 Michigan Wolverines

On January 2, 2018, Michigan defeated Iowa 75–68 with Livers contributing a career-best 13 points, which was considered a breakout performance. It was the first of three consecutive double-digit efforts off the bench for Livers. This resulted in Livers replacing Duncan Robinson in the starting lineup for Michigan when they faced Michigan State in their rivalry game on January 13. Michigan defeated the fourth-ranked Spartans for their first victory on the road against a top-five ranked team since January 25, 2014, ushering their way into the 2017–18 basketball rankings. Livers rolled his ankle in the second minute of the game against Northwestern on February 6 sidelining him for the rest of the game, which Michigan went on to lose. He missed the next game against Wisconsin before returning to the starting lineup on February 14 against Iowa. The team lost in the 2018 NCAA Division I Men's Basketball Championship Game to second-ranked Villanova.

=== Sophomore season (2018–2019) ===
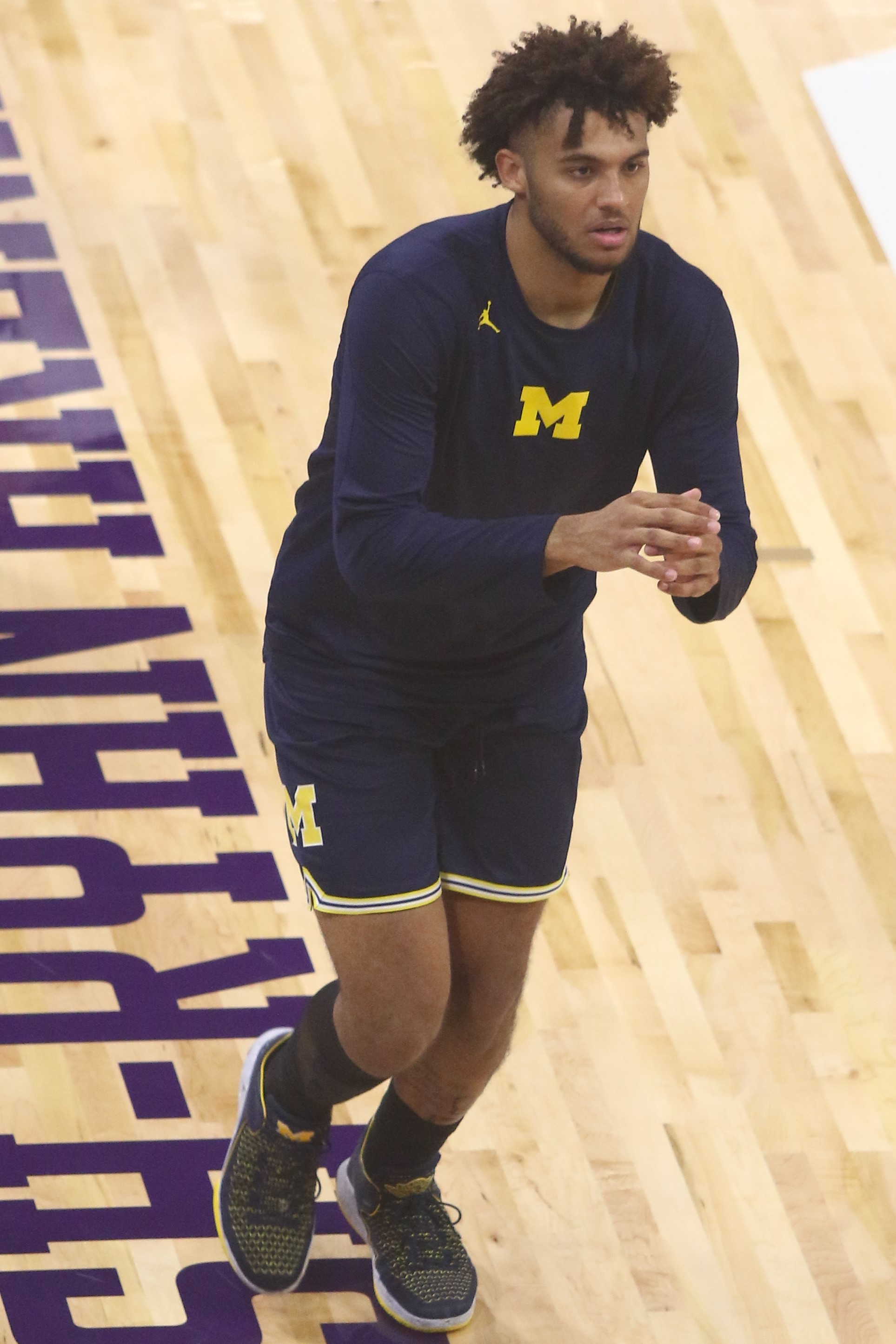
Livers for the 2018–19 Wolverines

On January 13, the 2018–19 Wolverines team defeated Northwestern to establish a school record for best start at 17–0 and tied the school's record 17-game win streak. On February 28, 2019, Michigan defeated Nebraska 82–53. Livers made his first start of the season, replacing an injured Charles Matthews, and posted 12 points and 10 assists, for his first career double-double. On March 14, Michigan defeated Minnesota 76–49 in the semifinals of the Big Ten tournament, as Livers posted a career-high 21 points. Livers' 42.6% (52/122) three point shooting percentage led the Big Ten Conference.

=== Junior season (2019–2020) ===
On November 12, Michigan defeated Creighton 79–69 in the Gavitt Tipoff Games behind a then career-high 22 points from Livers. On November 22, Michigan defeated Houston Baptist 111–68 behind a career-high 24 points by Livers. Michigan's 111 points were the most points scored in a game since a 112–64 victory over Indiana in 1998. He suffered a groin injury on December 21 in a win over Presbyterian. He missed nine of the next 10 games before facing Michigan State on February 8. On February 16, Livers suffered an ankle injury against Indiana and missed the following game against Rutgers. In his return versus Purdue, Livers had 19 points, six rebounds, two blocks and a steal in a 71–63 victory. On March 5, Michigan defeated Nebraska 82–58, as Livers posted 18 points and ten rebounds, for his second career double-double. At the close of the regular season, Livers was named honorable mention All-Big Ten by the media. Livers started 21 games and averaged 12.9 points per game while shooting 40 percent from behind the arc. He missed only two free-throws the entire season, making 44-for-46 (.957) from the line.

Following the season, he declared for the 2020 NBA draft, but did not hire an agent and left the door open to return for his senior season. On July 17, 2020, Livers announced that he would return to Michigan for his senior season.

=== Senior season (2020–2021) ===
During his senior season, Livers posted 16 double-figure games with a team-high five 20+ point games, and averaged 13.9 points per game. Livers made a team-high 50 three-pointers, reaching 50+ in a season for the second time in his career. He averaged a career-best 6.2 rebounds and 2.0 assists, and he added a pair of double-doubles. Following the season, he was named second-team All-Big Ten by the coaches and media. On March 13, 2021, Livers suffered a stress injury to his right foot during a quarterfinal game against Maryland in the 2021 Big Ten tournament, which sidelined him indefinitely. On April 2, 2021, Livers underwent successful surgery on his foot, with his recovery time expected to be a minimum of six months. On April 16, 2021, Livers declared for the 2021 NBA draft.

== Professional career ==
=== Detroit Pistons (2021–2024) ===
Livers was selected in the second round of the 2021 NBA draft with the 42nd pick by his hometown team the Detroit Pistons. On August 8, he signed with the Pistons. Because of a foot injury, he missed 59 of the first 60 games during his rookie season. On March 15, 2022, in his tenth game, Livers went 4–5 on three point shots to post a career high 16 points against the Miami Heat, as Livers was in the rotation in place of the injured Cade Cunningham, while Frank Jackson and Hamidou Diallo were sidelined to injuries. In his first NBA start on April 1, he posted career highs of 17 points and 11 rebounds for his first double-double against Oklahoma City.

On March 11, 2023, Livers posted a career high 18 points against the Indiana Pacers. On June 29, 2023, the Detroit Pistons exercised Livers’ team option for the 2023–24 NBA season.

On January 14, 2024, Livers was traded to the Washington Wizards, along with Marvin Bagley III and future draft considerations in exchange for Danilo Gallinari and Mike Muscala. On February 26, 2024, the Washington Wizards announced that Livers would miss the remainder of 2023–24 NBA season due to joint capsule inflammation in his right hip. However, he was waived by the Wizards on April 5 before playing for them. On October 18, 2024, Livers underwent a hip resurfacing procedure that was seen as likely to take a full year to recover from.

=== Phoenix Suns (2025–2026) ===
On July 8, 2025, Livers signed a two-way contract with the Phoenix Suns.

=== Yokohama B-Corsairs (2026–present) ===
On August 26, 2026, Livers signed with the Yokohama B-Corsairs of the Japanese B.League.

== Career statistics ==
Legend
GP	Games played	GS	Games started	MPG	Minutes per game
FG%	Field goal percentage	3P%	3-point field goal percentage	FT%	Free throw percentage
RPG	Rebounds per game	APG	Assists per game	SPG	Steals per game
BPG	Blocks per game	PPG	Points per game	**Bold**	Career high

=== NBA ===
Year	Team	GP	GS	MPG	FG%	3P%	FT%	RPG	APG	SPG	BPG	PPG
2021–22	Detroit	19	5	20.2	**.456**	**.422**	**.857**	**3.0**	**1.1**	**.7**	.4	6.4
2022–23	Detroit	**52**	**22**	**23.1**	.417	.365	.821	2.8	.8	.5	**.5**	**6.7**
2023–24	Detroit	23	6	20.4	.345	.286	.667	2.1	**1.1**	.6	.2	5.0
2025–26	Phoenix	36	0	9.6	.344	.300	.750	1.7	.6	.4	.2	1.8
Career		130	33	18.4	.400	.352	.783	2.4	.8	.5	.4	5.0

=== College ===
Year	Team	GP	GS	MPG	FG%	3P%	FT%	RPG	APG	SPG	BPG	PPG
2017–18	Michigan	**40**	22	15.1	.474	.362	.667	2.3	.4	.3	.3	3.4
2018–19	Michigan	35	3	22.6	**.487**	.426	.780	3.9	.7	**.7**	.5	7.9
2019–20	Michigan	21	21	31.5	.447	.402	**.957**	4.0	1.1	.4	**.7**	12.9
2020–21	Michigan	23	**23**	**31.6**	.457	**.431**	.870	**6.0**	**2.0**	.6	**.7**	**13.1**
Career		119	69	23.4	.465	.412	.856	3.8	.9	.5	.5	8.3

== See also ==
- Michigan Wolverines men's basketball statistical leaders
