= 2017–18 Michigan Wolverines men's basketball team =

American college basketball season

2017–18 Michigan Wolverines men's basketball

NCAA tournament, Runner-up Big Ten tournament champions

National Championship Game, L 62–79 vs. Villanova
- Conference: Big Ten Conference

Ranking
- Coaches: No. 2
- AP: No. 7
- Record: 33–8 (13–5 Big Ten)
- Head coach: John Beilein (11th season)
- Assistant coaches: Saddi Washington; DeAndre Haynes; Luke Yaklich
- MVPs: Moritz Wagner; Muhammad-Ali Abdur-Rahkman
- Captains: Moritz Wagner; Muhammad-Ali Abdur-Rahkman; Duncan Robinson
- Home arena: Crisler Center

2017–18 Big Ten Conference men's basketball standings
	Conf.				Overall
Team	W		L	PCT	W		L	PCT
No. 5 Michigan State	16	–	2	.889	30	–	5	.857
No. 11 Purdue	15	–	3	.833	30	–	7	.811
No. 17 Ohio State	15	–	3	.833	25	–	9	.735
No. 7 Michigan †	13	–	5	.722	33	–	8	.805
Nebraska	13	–	5	.722	22	–	11	.667
Penn State	9	–	9	.500	26	–	13	.667
Indiana	9	–	9	.500	16	–	15	.516
Maryland	8	–	10	.444	19	–	13	.594
Wisconsin	7	–	11	.389	15	–	18	.455
Northwestern	6	–	12	.333	15	–	17	.469
Minnesota	4	–	14	.222	15	–	17	.469
Illinois	4	–	14	.222	14	–	18	.438
Iowa	4	–	14	.222	14	–	19	.424
Rutgers	3	–	15	.167	15	–	19	.441
† 2018 Big Ten tournament winner Rankings from AP poll

The 2017–18 Michigan Wolverines men's basketball team represented the University of Michigan during the 2017–18 NCAA Division I men's basketball season. The Wolverines, led by head coach John Beilein in his 11th year, played their home games for the 51st consecutive year at the Crisler Center in Ann Arbor, Michigan. This season marked the program's 102nd season and its 101st consecutive year as a member of the Big Ten Conference.

The entering class included 2017 Michigan Gatorade Player of the Year and Mr. Basketball of Michigan Isaiah Livers. Kentucky transfer Charles Matthews became eligible to play this season after sitting out the 2016–17 NCAA Division I men's basketball season, while graduate transfer Jaaron Simmons became eligible to play immediately. The departing class included graduating seniors Zak Irvin and Derrick Walton who had completed their eligibility, and graduating seniors Mark Donnal and Andrew Dakich. In addition, D. J. Wilson declared for the 2017 NBA draft with two years of eligibility remaining. Jeff Meyer and Billy Donlon also departed prior to the season to take assistant coaching positions at Butler and Northwestern, respectively, and were replaced by DeAndre Haynes and Luke Yaklich.

During the regular season, the team finished tied for fourth in the Big Ten Conference. They earned a 5th seed in the 2018 Big Ten Conference men's basketball tournament, where they won the championship, thus defending the title won by the 2016–17 Wolverines in the 2017 Big Ten Conference men's basketball tournament the year before. The Wolverines finished the season with a 33–8 record, setting a program record for wins during a season. The team earned the third seed in the 2018 NCAA Division I men's basketball tournament and reached the Championship Game before losing to Villanova.

== Departures ==
Zak Irvin and Derrick Walton graduated during their senior seasons for the 2016–17 Michigan Wolverines men's basketball team. Mark Donnal and Andrew Dakich graduated with one year of eligibility remaining, which they could use under the graduate transfer rule to play elsewhere. Donnal committed to play with the Clemson Tigers. Dakich committed to play with the Quinnipiac Bobcats, but could not gain acceptance into his preferred graduate program. Dakich announced in July that he had committed to play with the Ohio State Buckeyes. On June 20, Michigan assistant coach and former Butler Bulldogs assistant coach Jeff Meyer left the program to join former Michigan assistant coach LaVall Jordan's staff at Butler. On June 26, Chicagoan and assistant coach Billy Donlon left the program to become an assistant under long-time friend Chris Collins at Northwestern. On October 11, Fred Wright-Jones left the team, but remained at Michigan as a student on a full academic scholarship.

== Preseason ==
In April 2017, some early pollsters included Michigan among the expected preseason top 25 teams: ESPN (#22), and Sports Illustrated (#23). However, most early polls omitted the team: Yahoo!, USA Today, NBC Sports, CBS Sports, Sporting News and Bleacher Report. At the time, ESPN's Eamonn Brennan felt it was a "foregone conclusion" that D. J. Wilson would declare for the 2017 NBA draft, with Sports Illustrated projecting him as a first round selection. On April 10, both D. J. Wilson and Moe Wagner declared for the 2017 NBA draft, but did not hire agents, which gave them until May 24 to withdraw their names and retain their athletic eligibility to return to Michigan. On April 25, Ohio grad transfer Jaaron Simmons announced that if he did not remain entered in the 2017 NBA draft, he would transfer to Michigan. Simmons, a 2017 first team All-Mid-American Conference honoree who averaged 15.9 points and 6.5 assists in 2016–17, had declared for the draft without hiring an agent on March 28. On April 30, Jeff Goodman of ESPN reported that Wagner and Wilson were invited to the NBA draft combine and Walton was named as an alternate. On May 23, the addition of Simmons as a graduate transfer was made official as Simmons removed himself from the NBA draft process. On May 24, Wagner withdrew his name from the NBA draft and Wilson did not. Following the deadline for returning to college and its announcements, Michigan was not ranked by some media outlets, including ESPN, CBS Sports, NBC Sports, USA Today, Fox Sports, and Yahoo! Sports,

In the fall preseason, Wagner was selected to the 10-man preseason All-Big Ten team. He was also one of two Big Ten players named to the 21-man Karl Malone Award watchlist. He was a preseason John R. Wooden Award and Naismith College Player of the Year watchlist honoree.

== 2017–18 recruits and personnel ==
On October 23, 2015, four-star recruit Jordan Poole became the first commitment for the Class of 2017 after home gym visit from Beilein and assistant coach Jordan and multiple Michigan campus visits. Poole had several competing offers including Illinois, Indiana, Nebraska, Memphis, Marquette, and Auburn. As a junior, Poole was a 2016 WBCA All-State Boys Basketball first team selection. On June 20, 2016, reports confirmed that Michigan had recruited Kentucky transfer Charles Matthews, who played his freshman season for the 2015–16 Kentucky Wildcats. Matthews would have to sit out the 2016–17 season. Michigan confirmed the story on July 1. The same day, Poole announced that he would transfer from Rufus King High School in Wisconsin to La Lumiere School in Indiana where he would experience a campus lifestyle, play a schedule with several ESPN broadcasts, and be teamed up with unsigned class of 2017 prospects Brian Bowen and Jeremiah Tilmon. On July 19, Spring Grove Area High School point guard Eli Brooks committed to Michigan over offers such as defending national champion Villanova, Ohio State, N.C. State, Temple and Kansas State. On August 7, 2016 Isaiah Livers committed to Michigan over contenders Michigan State, Butler, Minnesota, California and Boston College. On July 15, 2017, it was announced that Naji Ozeir would join the Michigan basketball team as a preferred walk-on. Ozeir, who had an offer withstanding from Wayne State to play on scholarship, had previously played for the Lebanese under-17 national basketball team in the 2015 Arab National Cup. Luke Wilson was added to the roster as a preferred walk-on on September 1, 2017. On the morning of the season-opening exhibition game, the team announced that student manager C. J. Baird would be elevated to the roster. In December, the team added Rico Ozuna-Harrison, who had been practicing with the team since walk-on tryouts in October, to the roster. Ozuna-Harrison had been a captain for the 2017 Cass Tech team that won the school's first Detroit Public School League title since 1998.

Livers was named 2017 Michigan Gatorade Player of the Year and Mr. Basketball of Michigan. He is Michigan's 11th Mr. Basketball of Michigan, but the first since Manny Harris in 2007. Poole was a member of the 2017 Dick's National High School Champion La Lumiere team.

College recruiting
Name	Hometown	School	Height	Weight	Commit date
Jordan Poole; SG	Milwaukee, Wisconsin	Rufus King High School (Wisconsin)/La Lumiere School (Indiana)	6 ft 3.5 in (1.92 m)	180 lb (82 kg)	Oct 23, 2015
Jordan Poole; SG	Recruit ratings: Scout: Rivals: 247Sports: ESPN:				
Eli Brooks; PG	Spring Grove, Pennsylvania	Spring Grove High School (Pennsylvania)	6 ft 1 in (1.85 m)	170 lb (77 kg)	Jul 19, 2016
Eli Brooks; PG	Recruit ratings: ESPN:				
Isaiah Livers; PF	Kalamazoo, Michigan	Kalamazoo Central High School (Michigan)	6 ft 7.5 in (2.02 m)	202.5 lb (91.9 kg)	Jul 8, 2016
Isaiah Livers; PF	Recruit ratings: Scout: Rivals: 247Sports: ESPN:				
Naji Ozeir; PF	Novi, Michigan	Novi High School (Michigan)/Salisbury School (Connecticut)	6 ft 8 in (2.03 m)	230 lb (100 kg)	Jul 15, 2017
Naji Ozeir; PF	Recruit ratings: Scout: Rivals: 247Sports: ESPN:				
C. J. Baird; F	Novi, Michigan	Detroit Catholic Central High School (Michigan)	6 ft 5 in (1.96 m)	220 lb (100 kg)	
C. J. Baird; F	Recruit ratings: Scout: Rivals: 247Sports: ESPN:				
Luke Wilson; G	Boulder, Colorado	Boulder High School (Colorado)	6 ft 0 in (1.83 m)	160 lb (73 kg)	N/A
Luke Wilson; G	Recruit ratings: Scout: Rivals: 247Sports: ESPN:				
Rico Ozuna-Harrison; G	Detroit, Michigan	Cass Technical High School (Michigan)	N/A	N/A	N/A
Rico Ozuna-Harrison; G	Recruit ratings: Scout: Rivals: 247Sports: ESPN:				
Overall recruit ranking:
Note: In many cases, Scout, Rivals, 247Sports, On3, and ESPN may conflict in their listings of height and weight.; In these cases, the average was taken. ESPN grades are on a 100-point scale.; Sources: "Michigan 2017 Basketball Commitments". Rivals.; "2017 Michigan Basketball Commits". Scout.; "ESPN Recruiting Nation Basketball". ESPN.; "Scout.com Team Recruiting Rankings". Scout.; "2017 Team Ranking". Rivals.

On August 4, 2017, Michigan announced that it had hired Luke Yaklich and DeAndre Haynes away from the Illinois State Redbirds to serve as assistant coaches. At the same time, the team promoted Chris Hunter from director of player personnel to director of basketball operations.

== Future recruits ==
=== 2018–19 ===
On December 22, 2016, junior recruit David DeJulius became the first commitment for the Class of 2018 after receiving a December 17 offer following his career-high 46-point, 7-rebound, 5-assist performance of December 17 in leading East English Village Preparatory Academy over Dakota High School. Brandon Johns became the second commitment for the Class of 2018 when he committed to Michigan on June 29, 2017, over several other schools including hometown Michigan State, along with fellow Big Ten universities Indiana, Iowa, and Purdue. At the time of his commitment, Johns was considered by several recruiting sites, such as 24/7Sports as well as ESPN, as the top recruit from Michigan in the Class of 2018.

In mid-June 2017, junior recruit Taylor Currie committed to Michigan, becoming, at the time, their first commitment for the Class of 2019. Two weeks later, Currie announced that he would be reclassifying and would be set to join the Class of 2018 marking the third member of the class. On September 22, 2017, Ignas Brazdeikis became the fourth; at that time he was ranked in the top 50 in the 24/7Sports composite top 100 rankings for recruits of the class of 2018. Brazdeikis committed to Michigan over schools such as Vanderbilt and Florida. On September 29, 2017, Currie decommitted from Michigan, dropping the number of 2018 recruits to three. On October 2, 2017, Adrien Nunez became the fourth member of the 2018 recruiting class. Nunez received much attention over the summer scouting period and drew praise for his shooting ability; he committed to Michigan over schools such as Penn State, Texas A&M, and Boston College. In October, Michigan added its fifth recruit to the 2018 recruiting class with the addition of Colin Castleton, who selected Michigan over Illinois. Castleton noted his connection with new Michigan assistant coach Luke Yaklich as a driving force behind communication with Michigan.

Johns and DeJulius finished second (2,792 points) and third (2,542), respectively, to Michigan State recruit Foster Loyer (3,691) in the 2018 Mr. Basketball of Michigan voting. All five finalists were Big Ten conference recruits (Michigan-2, Michigan State-2, Purdue-1). Brazdeikis repeated as the Ontario Scholastic Basketball Association MVP in 2018 after earning the award in 2017.

College recruiting (2018)
Name	Hometown	School	Height	Weight	Commit date
David DeJulius; PG	Detroit, Michigan	East English Village Preparatory Academy (Michigan)	6 ft 0.5 in (1.84 m)	190 lb (86 kg)	Dec 22, 2016
David DeJulius; PG	Recruit ratings: Scout: Rivals: 247Sports: ESPN:				
Brandon Johns; PF	East Lansing, Michigan	East Lansing High School (Michigan)	6 ft 8 in (2.03 m)	215 lb (98 kg)	Jun 29, 2017
Brandon Johns; PF	Recruit ratings: Scout: Rivals: 247Sports: ESPN:				
Ignas Brazdeikis; SF	Mono, Ontario	Orangeville Prep (Ontario)	6 ft 8 in (2.03 m)	220 lb (100 kg)	Sep 22, 2017
Ignas Brazdeikis; SF	Recruit ratings: Scout: Rivals: 247Sports: ESPN:				
Adrien Nunez; SG	Brooklyn, New York	St. Thomas More High School (New York)	6 ft 5 in (1.96 m)	175 lb (79 kg)	Oct 2, 2017
Adrien Nunez; SG	Recruit ratings: Scout: Rivals: 247Sports: ESPN:				
Colin Castleton; PF	Daytona Beach, Florida	Father Lopez Catholic High School (Florida)	6 ft 11 in (2.11 m)	215 lb (98 kg)	Oct 4, 2017
Colin Castleton; PF	Recruit ratings: Scout: Rivals: 247Sports: ESPN:				
Overall recruit ranking:
Note: In many cases, Scout, Rivals, 247Sports, On3, and ESPN may conflict in their listings of height and weight.; In these cases, the average was taken. ESPN grades are on a 100-point scale.; Sources: "Michigan 2018 Basketball Commitments". Rivals.; "2018 Michigan Basketball Commits". Scout.; "ESPN Recruiting Nation Basketball". ESPN.; "Scout.com Team Recruiting Rankings". Scout.; "2018 Team Ranking". Rivals.

== Regular season ==
=== November ===
Michigan began the season with a victory over North Florida. Although the game was tied with 11:03 remaining, Michigan won 86–66. Michigan was led by Duncan Robinson with a game-high 21 points, while Charles Matthews posted 20 points in his Michigan debut, marking the first time Michigan had two 20-point scorers since March 3, 2015. On November 13, Michigan defeated Central Michigan 72–65. Michigan had five double-digit scorers, including Muhammad-Ali Abdur-Rahkman who led the team with 17 points and Moe Wagner who contributed his second consecutive double-double, and third of his career. With seven lead changes in the game, Michigan took the lead for good with 8:47 remaining. On November 16, Jon Teske, who had previous career highs of four points and three rebounds, led Michigan with a 10-point, 11-rebound double-double as Michigan overcame its third second-half deficit in three games against Southern Miss.

In the first round of the 2017 Maui Invitational Tournament (its fifth) on November 20, against Louisiana State, Michigan overcame an eight-point deficit with 12 minutes remaining to take a nine-point lead with five minutes remaining only to lose 77–75. In the consolation bracket, Michigan defeated Chaminade the next day on the strength of Matthews' first career double-double (22 points and 10 rebounds). Michigan set or tied school single-game tournament records in scoring margin (38), field-goal percentage (64.9), assists (22), three-pointers made (15), three-point attempts (28), three-point percentage (53.6), steals (nine), turnover low (eight) and blocks (six). On November 22, Michigan defeated Virginia Commonwealth (VCU) 68–60, earning a fifth-place finish in the Maui Invitational Tournament. Michigan was led by Robinson with a game-high 18 points. Michigan trailed by three points with two minutes remaining, before the Wolverines outscored VCU 11–0 down the stretch. On November 26, Michigan defeated UC Riverside 87–42 on the strength of double-doubles by Wagner (21 points, 10 rebounds) and Matthews (17 points, 12 assists). It was the team's first pair of double-doubles in a game since Glenn Robinson III and Trey Burke did so for the 2012–13 National Runner-up Wolverines on January 6, 2013. On November 29, Michigan lost to (#13 AP Poll/#11 Coaches Poll) North Carolina 86–71 in the ACC–Big Ten Challenge. Michigan was led by Wagner with a team-high 20 points. This was the first meeting between the two teams since the 1993 NCAA Division I Men's Basketball Championship Game.

=== December ===
The 2018 Big Ten tournament was held at Madison Square Garden in New York City. Due to the Big East's use of that venue for the 2018 Big East tournament, the Big Ten tournament took place one week earlier than usual, ending the week before Selection Sunday. As a result, each team played one road game and one home conference game in the first week of December.

On December 2, Michigan defeated Indiana 69–55 in its Big Ten conference opener. Jordan Poole led the team with a career-high 19 points, while Muhammad-Ali Abdur Rahkman added eight points and a career-high 11 rebounds, and Eli Brooks added five points and a career-high six assists. Two days later, Michigan lost to Ohio State 71–62, after leading by as many as 20 points with 1:31 remaining in the first half. Michigan was led by Wagner with a team-high 14 points, and one rebound shy of a double-double. On December 9, Michigan defeated UCLA 78–69 in overtime. Michigan trailed by 15 points with 14:48 remaining in regulation, and tied the game with 10.9 seconds left to force overtime. Michigan was led by Wagner with a team-high 23-points, while Matthews added 20 points, marking the second time this season Michigan had two 20-point scorers in a game. Michigan forced 20 UCLA turnovers, with 12 coming off of steals. Zavier Simpson set a career-high with four steals, while Robinson tied a career-high with four steals. Michigan won despite shooting 8-for-22 on its free throws (including 2-for-13 by Wagner and Matthews), but Eli Brooks converted the two game-tying free throws when it mattered. Muhammad-Ali Abdur Rahkman's first career double-double (17 points and 10 rebounds), helped Michigan defeat Texas 59–52 on December 12. Michigan remained ahead of Texas for the final 35:36 of the game, although Wagner injured his ankle with 7:36 remaining. On December 16, Michigan defeated Detroit 90–58. Michigan was led by Matthews with a game-high 20 points, while Jon Teske made his first collegiate start and recorded his second career double-double (15 points and 10 rebounds). The game marked the first collegiate basketball game at Little Caesars Arena. Detroit was coached by former Michigan assistant coach Bacari Alexander and was led by former Wolverine Kameron Chatman who posted 18 points and 13 rebounds. On December 21, Michigan handed winless Alabama A&M Bulldogs a 97–47 defeat behind a career-high 31 points by Matthews, who became the first Michigan player to score 30 points since Aubrey Dawkins in March 2015. Michigan forced a season-high 25 turnovers. On December 30 Michigan defeated Jacksonville 76–51 in Wagner's return to the lineup. Abdur-Rahkman posted his first 20-point performance of the season on 7-for-7 shooting from the field.

=== January ===
On January 2, 2018, Michigan defeated Iowa 75–68. Simpson and Abdur-Rahkman led scoring with 15 points each, while Isaiah Livers added a career-high 13 points. On January 6, Michigan defeated Illinois 79–69 as six players reached double figures. Wagner led the way with 14 points and a season-high-tying three blocks in his first double digit scoring effort since his injury. It was the first time Michigan had six players reach double figures since a 2017 contest against Indiana. On January 9, Michigan lost to (#5 AP Poll/#7 Coaches Poll) Purdue 70–69, ending their seven-game winning streak. Michigan was led by Simpson with a career-tying 15 points and career-high six rebounds. After trailing by as many as 14 points in the first half, Michigan took its first lead following back-to-back triples from Simpson with 4:30 remaining in the second half. Vincent Edwards then tied the game at 69 with 2:28 remaining in the game. The game remained tied until the final four seconds when Isaac Haas made his first free throw attempt to give Purdue the win. On January 13, Isaiah Livers replaced Duncan Robinson in the starting lineup, as Michigan won their rivalry game against (#4 AP Poll/#4 Coaches Poll) Michigan State 82–72. Wagner led the Wolverines with a career-high 27 points. There were 13 lead changes and 11 ties throughout the game. The win marked their first victory on the road against a top-five ranked team since defeating (#3 AP Poll/#3 Coaches Poll) Michigan State on January 25, 2014; it was also first win at Breslin Center since 2014.

Following the win, Michigan entered the 2017–18 basketball rankings for the first time on January 15 at #23 AP Poll and #24 Coaches Poll. On January 15, Michigan defeated Maryland 68–67. After trailing by 14 points in the first half and 10 points at halftime, Michigan scored the first ten points of the second half in 3:02 of play and built up a 10-point lead with 5:50 remaining. However, Maryland eventually posted a go-ahead three-point shot with three seconds remaining, before Abdur-Rahkman recorded two free throws with 1.2 seconds remaining, giving him exactly 1,000 career points and the Wolverines the win. Michigan was led by Wagner with 18 points and 11 rebounds for his fourth double-double of the season. Other Michigan highlights included seven consecutive three-point shots. On January 18, Michigan lost to Nebraska 72–52, the Cornhuskers first win over the Wolverines since 1964, snapping Michigan's 10-game winning streak against them. Matthews led the team with 15 points, and eight rebounds. The 20-point loss was Michigan's most lopsided defeat against a Big Ten opponent since losing to Michigan State by 23 points in February 2013.

On January 21, Michigan defeated Rutgers 62–47. Michigan was led by Wagner with 16 points, while Simpson added 10 points and a career-high eight rebounds. Michigan's defense held Rutgers to just 47 points, 22.5 points below its 69.5 points per game average. During the game the 1967–68 team was honored as the first team to play at the Crisler Center, as part of arena's 50th anniversary celebrations. On January 25, Michigan lost to (#3 AP Poll/#3 Coaches Poll) Purdue 92–88. Michigan was led by Abdur-Rahkman with a then career-high 26 points. There were 24 lead changes and five ties during the game. On January 29, Michigan defeated Northwestern 58–47. After falling behind 19–11 early in the first half, Michigan held Northwestern without a point for over 10 minutes and held on for a victory due in part to a season-low five turnovers, while forcing 16 Northwestern turnovers. Michigan was led by Matthews with a team-high 14 points, seven rebounds and a career-high three steals, while Poole added eight points and a career-high three assists.

=== February ===
On February 3, Michigan defeated Minnesota 76–73 in overtime. Wagner (16 points, 10 rebounds) and Matthews (13 points, 11 rebounds) both posted double-doubles, marking the second time this season Michigan had two players record a double-double in the same game. Michigan took its first lead of the game with 16:15 remaining in the game. Minnesota then obtained its largest lead of the game at ten points five minutes later. On February 6, Livers was sidelined in the second minute of play, as Michigan was upset by Northwestern 61–52. Michigan was led by Wagner with 20 points and nine rebounds, one rebound shy of his second consecutive double-double. On February 11, Michigan reached 20 wins with an 83–72 victory over Wisconsin. Michigan was led by Wagner with 20 points and 11 rebounds, for his seventh double-double of his career. Michigan rode a 22-point half time lead to victory as Robinson returned to the starting lineup, where he recorded 14 points and made four three-point shots in the first half. After missing the better part of two games, Livers returned to the starting lineup on February 14, as Michigan defeated Iowa for a second time by a 74–59 margin. The team posted a season-high 13 steals, including a season-high four from Wagner and three from his backup Jon Teske. Robinson posted a season-high six three-point shots, giving him 18 points, while Abdur-Rahkman contributed 18 points with a season-high seven assists. With his six three-pointers, Robinson surpassed Zack Novak for sixth all-time on Michigan's career three-point leaderboard with 215 for his career. On February 18, Michigan defeated (#8 AP Poll/#9 Coaches Poll) Ohio State 74–62 in their final home game of the regular season. Michigan was led by Abdur Rahkman with 17 points. Prior to the game Michigan honored seniors Abdur-Rahkman, and Robinson, graduate student Jaaron Simmons and undergraduate student assistant Austin Hatch during senior day. On February 21 Michigan defeated Penn State 72–63. Robinson led the way with 19 points off the bench and the team had a season-high 84 percent free throw percentage, which included going 9-for-10 in the final minute of the game. On February 24, Michigan defeated Maryland 85–61 in the final game of the regular season. Michigan was led by Abdur-Rahkman with a career-high 28 points, including 22 points in the first half. Michigan's 24-point victory was the worst home loss for Maryland since the 1997–98 Terrapins lost to Duke by 32 points in 1998. The win was the Wolverines' first win at Maryland since 1937.

== Postseason ==
=== Big Ten tournament ===
On March 1, Michigan opened its 2018 Big Ten Conference men's basketball tournament play with a 77–71 overtime victory over Iowa. Michigan survived a rough shooting night (56% on free throws and 16% three-point field goals) and foul trouble (Wagner and Abdur-Rahkman fouled out) to get the victory. Matthews led the way with 16 points, but Robinson made the go ahead three point shot with 2:17 remaining in overtime and the sank two free throws to give Michigan a two-possession lead with 10 seconds remaining.

The next day, Michigan defeated Nebraska 77–58 in the quarterfinals of the Big Ten tournament. Michigan was led by Abdur-Rahkman with 21 points, while Wagner recorded his seventh double-double of the season with 20 points and 13 rebounds. Michigan's defense held Nebraska to just 30% shooting for the game (16-of-53), including 1-of-20 during a 13:32 stretch in the first half. Robinson scored his 1,000th career point on his second 3-point field goal of the first half. Abdur-Rahkman (5–5) became the second player in the history of the Big Ten Conference men's basketball tournament to be perfect on at least 5 three-point shots in a single game. On March 3, Michigan defeated (#2 AP Poll/#2 Coaches Poll) Michigan State 75–64 in the semifinals of the Big Ten tournament. With the win, Michigan advanced to the Big Ten tournament final for the second consecutive season, and snapped Michigan State's 13-game winning streak. Michigan was led by Abdur-Rahkman, Simpson and Wagner with 15 points each. Wagner scored his 1,000th career point in the second half of the game, becoming the 54th Wolverine to reach the milestone.

On March 4, Michigan defeated (#8 AP Poll/#8 Coaches Poll) Purdue 75–66 to claim their second consecutive Big Ten tournament championship. They became the first fifth seed to win the championship and the first team to win consecutive tournament championships since Ohio State in 2010 and 2011. Michigan was led by Wagner with a team-high 17 points, and was named tournament MVP, while Abdur-Rahkman recorded 15 points and was named to the All-Tournament Team.

=== NCAA tournament ===
On March 15, Michigan began their participation in the 2018 NCAA tournament with a 61–47 victory over Montana in the first round. Michigan was led by Matthews with 20 points and a career-tying 11 rebounds, for his fourth double-double of the season. After Montana jumped out to an early 10–0 lead, Michigan's defense held Montana to just 32.1% shooting for the game, including 1-of-14 during a ten-minute stretch to start the second half. The second half was delayed for over 10 minutes with 17:53 remaining when the shot clocks lost power.

On March 17, Michigan defeated (#21 AP Poll/#19 Coaches Poll) Houston 64–63 in the second round, following a game-winning buzzer beater three-point shot by Poole as time expired. Abdur-Rahkman and Wagner led the scoring with 12 points each. There were 17 lead changes and 12 ties during the game, while neither team ever led by more than six points. With the win, Michigan advanced to its fourth Sweet 16 in six years. On March 22, Michigan defeated Texas A&M 99–72 in the regional semifinals. Abdur-Rahkman led with 24 points, while Wagner added 21 points, and Matthews 18 points. Michigan made 10 of its 14 three-pointers in the first half to take a 52–28 lead at halftime. Eight different Wolverines made a three-point field goal, setting a program record for most players to make one in an NCAA tournament game. Michigan posted 12 steals, including a career-high six by Simpson, which tied a Michigan NCAA tournament record. Michigan's 99 points were the sixth most in program history in the NCAA tournament, and the most they've scored since scoring 102 against East Tennessee in 1992. Michigan's 61.9% shooting was its second-best in program history in the NCAA tournament. With the win, Michigan advanced to its third Elite Eight in six years.

On March 24, Michigan defeated Florida State 58–54 in the regional finals. Michigan was led by Matthews with 17 points. With the win, Michigan advances to the Final Four for the eighth time in program history and for the first time since 2013. Michigan set a single-season program record with its 32nd victory of the season, surpassing the previous record of 31 wins set by the 1992–93 and 2012–13 teams. Michigan's defense held Florida State to just 23.3% (7-of-30) shooting in the second half. Matthews was named West Region Most Outstanding Player and was joined on the West Region All-tournament team by Wagner and Abdur-Rahkman. With the Wolverines men's basketball team advancing to the Final Four and the 2017–18 Michigan Wolverines men's ice hockey team advancing to the Frozen Four, it was the fourth time that both programs made their respective final four tournaments during the same season, and just the sixth time overall.

On March 31, Michigan defeated Loyola–Chicago 69–57 in the national semifinals. Michigan was led by Wagner with 24 points and a career-high 15 rebounds, for his eighth double-double of the season, while Matthews added 17 points. Wagner became the third player with at least 20 points and 15 rebounds in a national semifinal game, and the first to do so since Hakeem Olajuwon in 1983. Michigan thus advanced to its seventh national championship game, and first since 2013, and set a single season record with its 33rd victory.

On April 2, Michigan lost to (#2 Coaches Poll/#2 AP Poll) Villanova 79–62 in the National Championship Game. The loss snapped Michigan's 14-game win streak that dated back to February 6, and was the longest active winning streak in the nation. This was Michigan's longest winning streak since winning the first 16 games to start the 2012–13 season. Michigan was led by Abdur-Rahkman with 23 points, who finished his collegiate career as Michigan's all-time leader in games played with 144 games. Wagner was Michigan's only representative on the Final Four All-Tournament Team.

With the loss to Villanova, Michigan's record in the national championship game fell to 1–6, the worst record among teams that have previously won a national championship. This was the fourth consecutive loss in the championship game for the Wolverines since their sole title in 1989, having previously lost in 1992, 1993, and 2013.

== Schedule and results ==
The team's motto that could be seen on some of the team's athleticwear was "Do More, Say Less", which was the name of a song by Ann Arbor rapper P. L. that pays tribute to the team.

Date time, TV	Rank^{#}	Opponent^{#}	Result	Record	High points	High rebounds	High assists	Site (attendance) city, state
Exhibition
Nov 2, 2017*; TBA, BTN+		Grand Valley State	W 82–50	–	23 – Matthews	10 – Wagner	4 – Robinson	Crisler Center (N/A); Ann Arbor, Michigan
Regular season
Nov 11, 2017*; 7:30 pm, BTN+		North Florida; Maui Jim Maui Invitational campus game	W 86–66	1–0	21 – Robinson	12 – Wagner	9 – Simpson	Crisler Center (9,916); Ann Arbor, Michigan
Nov 13, 2017*; 7:00 pm, BTN		Central Michigan	W 72–65	2–0	17 – Abdur-Rahkman	11 – Wagner	4 – Abdur-Rahkman	Crisler Center (8,951); Ann Arbor, Michigan
Nov 16, 2017*; 7:00 pm, BTN+		Southern Miss	W 61–47	3–0	14 – Abdur-Rahkman	11 – Teske	5 – Simmons	Crisler Center (8,765); Ann Arbor, Michigan
Nov 20, 2017*; 11:30 pm, ESPNU		vs. LSU; Maui Jim Maui Invitational quarterfinals	L 75–77	3–1	28 – Matthews	8 – Matthews	4 – Abdur-Rahkman	Lahaina Civic Center; Lahaina, Hawaii
Nov 21, 2017*; 8:00 pm, ESPN2		vs. Chaminade; Maui Jim Maui Invitational	W 102–64	4–1	22 – Matthews	10 – Matthews	5 – Abdur-Rahkman	Lahaina Civic Center; Lahaina, Hawaii
Nov 22, 2017*; 5:00 pm, ESPN2		vs. VCU; Maui Jim Maui Invitational	W 68–60	5–1	18 – Robinson	9 – Wagner	4 – Abdur-Rahkman	Lahaina Civic Center; Lahaina, Hawaii
Nov 26, 2017*; 4:00 pm, FS1		UC Riverside	W 87–42	6–1	21 – Wagner	10 – Wagner	12 – Matthews	Crisler Center (9,841); Ann Arbor, Michigan
Nov 29, 2017*; 7:30 pm, ESPN		at No. 13 North Carolina; ACC–Big Ten Challenge	L 71–86	6–2	20 – Wagner	9 – Wagner	3 – 3 tied	Dean Smith Center (19,036); Chapel Hill, North Carolina
Dec 2, 2017; 12:30 pm, CBS		Indiana	W 69–55	7–2 (1–0)	19 – Poole	11 – Abdur-Rahkman	6 – Brooks	Crisler Center (11,661); Ann Arbor, Michigan
Dec 4, 2017; 6:30 pm, FS1		at Ohio State	L 62–71	7–3 (1–1)	14 – Wagner	9 – Wagner	3 – 3 tied	Value City Arena (12,546); Columbus, Ohio
Dec 9, 2017*; 12:00 pm, CBS		UCLA	W 78–69 ^{OT}	8–3	23 – Wagner	8 – Matthews	3 – 3 tied	Crisler Center (12,137); Ann Arbor, Michigan
Dec 12, 2017*; 9:00 pm, ESPN2		at Texas	W 59–52	9–3	17 – Abdur-Rahkman	10 – Abdur-Rahkman	4 – Simpson	Frank Erwin Center (12,504); Austin, Texas
Dec 16, 2017*; 12:00 pm, ESPNU		vs. Detroit; Detroit Showcase	W 90–58	10–3	20 – Matthews	10 – Teske	7 – Simpson	Little Caesars Arena (20,645); Detroit, Michigan
Dec 21, 2017*; 9:00 pm, ESPNU		Alabama A&M	W 97–47	11–3	31 – Matthews	7 – Livers	5 – Abdur-Rahkman	Crisler Arena (9,325); Ann Arbor, Michigan
Dec 30, 2017*; 6:00 pm, BTN		Jacksonville	W 76–51	12–3	20 – Abdur-Rahkman	7 – Matthews	5 – Simpson	Crisler Center (12,707); Ann Arbor, Michigan
Jan 2, 2018; 7:00 pm, ESPN2		at Iowa	W 75–68	13–3 (2–1)	15 – 2 tied	7 – 3 tied	7 – Simpson	Carver–Hawkeye Arena (11,363); Iowa City, Iowa
Jan 6, 2018; 12:00 pm, BTN		Illinois	W 79–69	14–3 (3–1)	14 – Wagner	7 – Wagner	7 – Simpson	Crisler Center (11,888); Ann Arbor, Michigan
Jan 9, 2018; 9:00 pm, ESPN		No. 5 Purdue	L 69–70	14–4 (3–2)	15 – Simpson	7 – Matthews	5 – Simpson	Crisler Center (10,164); Ann Arbor, Michigan
Jan 13, 2018; 12:00 pm, FOX		at No. 4 Michigan State; Rivalry	W 82–72	15–4 (4–2)	27 – Wagner	4 – 4 tied	5 – Simpson	Breslin Center (14,797); East Lansing, Michigan
Jan 15, 2018; 6:30 pm, FS1	No. 23	Maryland	W 68–67	16–4 (5–2)	18 – Wagner	11 – Wagner	6 – Matthews	Crisler Center (10,545); Ann Arbor, Michigan
Jan 18, 2018; 9:00 pm, BTN	No. 23	at Nebraska	L 52–72	16–5 (5–3)	15 – Matthews	8 – Matthews	2 – 3 tied	Pinnacle Bank Arena (14,589); Lincoln, Nebraska
Jan 21, 2018; 12:00 pm, BTN	No. 23	Rutgers	W 62–47	17–5 (6–3)	16 – Wagner	8 – Simpson	4 – 3 tied	Crisler Center (11,582); Ann Arbor, Michigan
Jan 25, 2018; 7:00 pm, ESPN	No. 25	at No. 3 Purdue	L 88–92	17–6 (6–4)	26 – Abdur-Rahkman	4 – 3 tied	6 – Matthews	Mackey Arena (14,804); West Lafayette, Indiana
Jan 29, 2018; 7:00 pm, FS1	No. 24	Northwestern	W 58–47	18–6 (7–4)	14 – Matthews	8 – Wagner	3 – 4 tied	Crisler Center (10,879); Ann Arbor, Michigan
Feb 3, 2018; 2:30 pm, FOX	No. 24	Minnesota	W 76–73 ^{OT}	19–6 (8–4)	17 – Abdur-Rahkman	11 – Matthews	3 – 3 tied	Crisler Center (12,707); Ann Arbor, Michigan
Feb 6, 2018; 7:00 pm, BTN	No. 20	at Northwestern	L 52–61	19–7 (8–5)	20 – Wagner	9 – Wagner	5 – Simpson	Allstate Arena (7,457); Rosemont, Illinois
Feb 11, 2018; 1:00 pm, CBS	No. 20	at Wisconsin	W 83–72	20–7 (9–5)	20 – Wagner	11 – Wagner	6 – Simpson	Kohl Center (17,287); Madison, Wisconsin
Feb 14, 2018; 6:30 pm, BTN	No. 22	Iowa	W 74–59	21–7 (10–5)	18 – 2 tied	8 – 2 tied	7 – Abdur-Rahkman	Crisler Center (10,173); Ann Arbor, Michigan
Feb 18, 2018; 1:00 pm, CBS	No. 22	No. 8 Ohio State	W 74–62	22–7 (11–5)	17 – Abdur-Rahkman	7 – 2 tied	3 – 3 tied	Crisler Center (12,707); Ann Arbor, Michigan
Feb 21, 2018; 7:00 pm, BTN	No. 17	at Penn State	W 72–63	23–7 (12–5)	19 – Robinson	8 – Wagner	5 – Abdur-Rahkman	Bryce Jordan Center (13,586); University Park, Pennsylvania
Feb 24, 2018; 12:00 pm, ESPN	No. 17	at Maryland	W 85–61	24–7 (13–5)	28 – Abdur-Rahkman	8 – Abdur-Rahkman	7 – Abdur-Rahkman	Xfinity Center (17,415); College Park, Maryland
Big Ten tournament
Mar 1, 2018; 2:30 pm, BTN	(5) No. 15	vs. (12) Iowa; Second round	W 77–71 ^{OT}	25–7	16 – Matthews	9 – Teske	3 – 2 tied	Madison Square Garden (13,815); New York City, New York
Mar 2, 2018; 2:30 pm, BTN	(5) No. 15	vs. (4) Nebraska; Quarterfinal	W 77–58	26–7	21 – Abdur-Rahkman	13 – Wagner	6 – Simpson	Madison Square Garden (10,292); New York City, New York
Mar 3, 2018; 2:00 pm, CBS	(5) No. 15	vs. (1) No. 2 Michigan State; Semifinal	W 75–64	27–7	15 – 3 tied	8 – Wagner	3 – 2 tied	Madison Square Garden (19,812); New York City, New York
Mar 4, 2018; 4:30 pm, CBS	(5) No. 15	vs. (3) No. 8 Purdue; Championship	W 75–66	28–7	17 – Wagner	5 – Simpson	5 – Simpson	Madison Square Garden (15,063); New York City, New York
NCAA tournament
Mar 15, 2018*; 9:50 pm, TBS	(3 W) No. 7	vs. (14 W) Montana; First round	W 61–47	29–7	20 – Matthews	11 – Matthews	4 – Simpson	Intrust Bank Arena (14,019); Wichita, Kansas
Mar 17, 2018*; 9:40 pm, TBS	(3 W) No. 7	vs. (6 W) No. 21 Houston; Second round	W 64–63	30–7	12 – 2 tied	8 – Simpson	4 – Simpson	Intrust Bank Arena (14,385); Wichita, Kansas
Mar 22, 2018*; 7:37 pm, TBS	(3 W) No. 7	vs. (7 W) Texas A&M; Sweet Sixteen	W 99–72	31–7	24 – Abdur-Rahkman	5 – 2 tied	7 – Abdur-Rahkman	Staples Center (19,181); Los Angeles, California
Mar 24, 2018*; 8:49 pm, TBS	(3 W) No. 7	vs. (9 W) Florida State; Elite Eight	W 58–54	32–7	17 – Matthews	8 – Matthews	5 – Simpson	Staples Center (19,665); Los Angeles, California
Mar 31, 2018*; 6:09 pm, TBS	(3 W) No. 7	vs. (11 S) Loyola–Chicago; Final Four	W 69–57	33–7	24 – Wagner	15 – Wagner	3 – Simpson	Alamodome (68,257); San Antonio, Texas
April 2, 2018*; 9:20 pm, TBS	(3 W) No. 7	vs. (1 E) No. 2 Villanova; National Championship	L 62–79	33–8	23 – Abdur-Rahkman	7 – Wagner	2 – Simpson	Alamodome (67,831); San Antonio, Texas
*Non-conference game. ^{#}Rankings from AP Poll. (#) Tournament seedings in parentheses. W=West S=South E=East. All times are in Eastern Time.

== Roster ==
2017–18 Michigan Wolverines men's basketball team
Players
Coaches

Pos.	#	Name	Height	Weight	Year	Hometown
F	0	Brent Hibbits (W)	6 ft 8 in (2.03 m)	220 lb (100 kg)	RS So	Hudsonville, Michigan
G	1	Charles Matthews	6 ft 6 in (1.98 m)	200 lb (91 kg)	RS So	Chicago, Illinois
G	2	Jordan Poole	6 ft 4 in (1.93 m)	190 lb (86 kg)	Fr	Milwaukee, Wisconsin
G	3	Zavier Simpson	6 ft 0 in (1.83 m)	185 lb (84 kg)	So	Lima, Ohio
F	4	Isaiah Livers	6 ft 7 in (2.01 m)	230 lb (104 kg)	Fr	Kalamazoo, Michigan
G	5	Jaaron Simmons	6 ft 1 in (1.85 m)	185 lb (84 kg)	RS Sr	Dayton, Ohio
G	11	Luke Wilson (W)	6 ft 0 in (1.83 m)	160 lb (73 kg)	Fr	Boulder, Colorado
G	12	Muhammad-Ali Abdur-Rahkman (C)	6 ft 4 in (1.93 m)	190 lb (86 kg)	Sr	Allentown, Pennsylvania
F	13	Moritz Wagner (C)	6 ft 11 in (2.11 m)	245 lb (111 kg)	Jr	Berlin, Germany
G	14	Rico Ozuna-Harrison (W)	5 ft 11 in (1.8 m)	165 lb (75 kg)	Fr	Detroit, Michigan
C	15	Jon Teske	7 ft 1 in (2.16 m)	255 lb (116 kg)	So	Medina, Ohio
G/F	22	Duncan Robinson (C)	6 ft 8 in (2.03 m)	215 lb (98 kg)	RS Sr	New Castle, New Hampshire
G/F	23	Ibi Watson	6 ft 5 in (1.96 m)	200 lb (91 kg)	So	Pickerington, Ohio
F	24	C.J. Baird (W)	6 ft 5 in (1.96 m)	220 lb (100 kg)	Fr	Novi, Michigan
F	25	Naji Ozeir (W)	6 ft 8 in (2.03 m)	225 lb (102 kg)	Fr	Novi, Michigan
F	51	Austin Davis	6 ft 10 in (2.08 m)	245 lb (111 kg)	RS Fr	Onsted, Michigan
G	55	Eli Brooks	6 ft 0 in (1.83 m)	170 lb (77 kg)	Fr	Spring Grove, Pennsylvania

Head coach

- John Beilein (Wheeling)

Assistant coach(es)

- Saddi Washington (Western Michigan)
- DeAndre Haynes (Kent State)
- Luke Yaklich (Illinois State)

Legend

- (C) Team captain
- (S) Suspended
- (I) Ineligible
- (W) Walk-on
- Injured
- Current redshirt

Roster

=== Coaching staff ===
Name	Position	Year at Michigan	Alma Mater (year)
Saddi Washington	Assistant Coach	2nd	Western Michigan (1998)
DeAndre Haynes	Assistant Coach	1st	Kent State (2006)
Luke Yaklich	Assistant Coach	1st	Illinois State (1998)

Support Staff
Chris Hunter – Director of Basketball Operations
Chinedu Nwachukwu – Director of Player Personnel
Bryan Smothers – Video Analyst
Devon Mulry – Graduate Manager

== Rankings ==
Ranking movements Legend: ██ Increase in ranking ██ Decrease in ranking RV = Received votes
	Week																			
Poll	Pre	1	2	3	4	5	6	7	8	9	10	11	12	13	14	15	16	17	18	Final
AP	RV	RV	RV				RV	RV		RV	23	25	24	20	22	17	15	7	7	Not released
Coaches'	RV		RV	RV	RV		RV	RV	RV	RV	24	25	25	20	21	16	13	7	7	2

== Statistics ==
The team posted the following statistics:

Legend
GP	Games played	GS	Games started	MPG	Minutes per game
FG%	Field goal percentage	3P%	3-point field goal percentage	FT%	Free throw percentage
RPG	Rebounds per game	APG	Assists per game	SPG	Steals per game
BPG	Blocks per game	PPG	Points per game	**Bold**	Career high

**Name**	**GP**	**GS**	**Min.**	**MPG**	**FG**	**FGA**	**FG%**	**3FG**	**3FGA**	**3P%**	**FT**	**FTA**	**FT%**	**OR**	**DR**	**RB**	**RPG**	**Ast.**	**APG**	**PF**	**DQ**	**TO**	**Stl.**	**Blk.**	**Pts.**	**PPG**
Moritz Wagner	39	39	1078	27.6	216	409	0.528	63	160	0.394	75	108	0.694	57	221	278	7.1	33	0.8	120	3	56	38	20	570	14.6
Charles Matthews	41	41	1234	30.1	205	414	0.495	34	107	0.318	87	156	0.558	53	174	227	5.5	98	2.4	88	2	84	30	26	531	13
Muhammad-Ali Abdur-Rahkman	41	41	1432	34.9	179	415	0.431	73	195	0.374	97	129	0.752	27	131	158	3.9	132	3.2	65	1	30	35	7	528	12.9
Duncan Robinson	41	19	1059	25.8	122	277	0.44	78	203	0.384	57	64	0.891	19	81	100	2.4	44	1.1	99	2	25	27	16	379	9.2
Zavier Simpson	41	29	1085	26.5	115	246	0.467	24	84	0.286	47	91	0.516	18	115	133	3.2	150	3.7	55	0	61	53	2	301	7.3
Jordan Poole	39	0	476	12.2	75	175	0.429	40	108	0.37	43	52	0.827	3	50	53	1.4	22	0.6	40	0	25	20	6	233	6
Jon Teske	41	2	506	12.3	53	98	0.541	0	1	0	35	61	0.574	57	78	135	3.3	15	0.4	66	0	15	23	26	141	3.4
Isaiah Livers	40	22	604	15.1	54	114	0.474	21	58	0.362	8	12	0.667	36	57	93	2.3	16	0.4	44	0	23	12	11	137	3.4
Ibi Watson	26	0	136	5.2	21	54	0.389	10	31	0.323	6	11	0.545	11	10	21	0.8	8	0.3	6	0	4	7	1	58	2.2
Eli Brooks	31	12	311	10	19	63	0.302	10	41	0.244	8	13	0.615	9	24	33	1.1	30	1	16	0	13	12	3	56	1.8
Jaaron Simmons	33	0	264	8	18	44	0.409	6	18	0.333	8	14	0.571	4	20	24	0.7	35	1.1	26	0	21	2	0	50	1.5
Austin Davis	16	0	50	3.1	9	14	0.643	0	0		1	3	0.333	7	15	22	1.4	0	0	15	1	3	1	6	19	1.2
Brent Hibbitts	5	0	15	3	3	5	0.6	1	1	1	2	2	1	2	1	3	0.6	1	0.2	2	0	1	0	1	9	1.8
CJ Baird	5	0	8	1.6	2	3	0.667	1	2	0.5	0	0		0	1	1	0.2	1	0.2	0	0	1	0	1	5	1
Naji Ozeir	2	0	7	3.5	1	2	0.5	0	0		0	0		0	1	1	0.5	0	0	1	0	0	1	0	2	1
Luke Wilson	2	0	7	3.5	0	1	0	0	1	0	0	1	0	0	0	0	0	0	0	1	0	1	0	0	0	0
Rico Ozuna-Harrison	1	0	3	3	0	1	0	0	1	0	0	0		0	1	1	1	0	0	0	0	0	0	0	0	0
TEAM	41													42	40	82	2					17				
Season Total	41				1092	2335	0.468	361	1011	0.357	474	717	0.661	345	1020	1365	33.3	585	14.3	644	9	380	261	126	3019	73.6
Opponents	41				948	2227	0.426	222	676	0.328	478	663	0.721	345	1009	1354	33	412	10	729		530	172	129	2596	63.3

== Honors ==
Following the season, Wagner was a second team All-Big Ten selection by the coaches and the media; Abdur-Rahkman was an honorable mention selection by both the coaches and the media; and Robinson was named the All-Big Ten Sixth Man of the Year by the coaches. Wagner was an All-District selection by the U.S. Basketball Writers Association based upon voting from its national membership. Wagner was an All-District selection by the U.S. Basketball Writers Association based upon voting from its national membership. He was a second team selection in the Big Ten by the National Association of Basketball Coaches. The team had five members earn Academic All-Big Ten honors for maintaining a 3.0 grade point average: Austin Davis, Matthews. Robinson, Jaaron Simmons, and Wagner. Wagner was the Most Outstanding Player of the Big Ten tournament and Abdur-Rahkman was on the All-Tournament team. In the NCAA tournament, Matthews was named West Region Most Outstanding Player and was joined by Wagner and Abdur-Rahkman on the West Region All-tournament team. Wagner was named to the Final Four All-Tournament Team.

=== Team players drafted into the NBA ===
Wagner was drafted with the 25th pick in the first round of the 2018 NBA draft, becoming Michigan's 27th first round selection and 7th under head coach Beilein. He was the fourth and final 2017–18 Big Ten Conference player drafted in the first round of the 2018 draft, and the fourth of eight drafted overall in the draft.

Year	Round	Pick	Overall	Player	NBA club
2018	1	25	25	Moritz Wagner	Los Angeles Lakers
2019	1	28	28	Jordan Poole	Golden State Warriors
2021	2	12	42	Isaiah Livers	Detroit Pistons

== See also ==
- 2018 in Michigan
- List of Michigan Wolverines men's basketball seasons
- Michigan Wolverines men's basketball
