= Thomas Allen (basketball) =

American basketball player

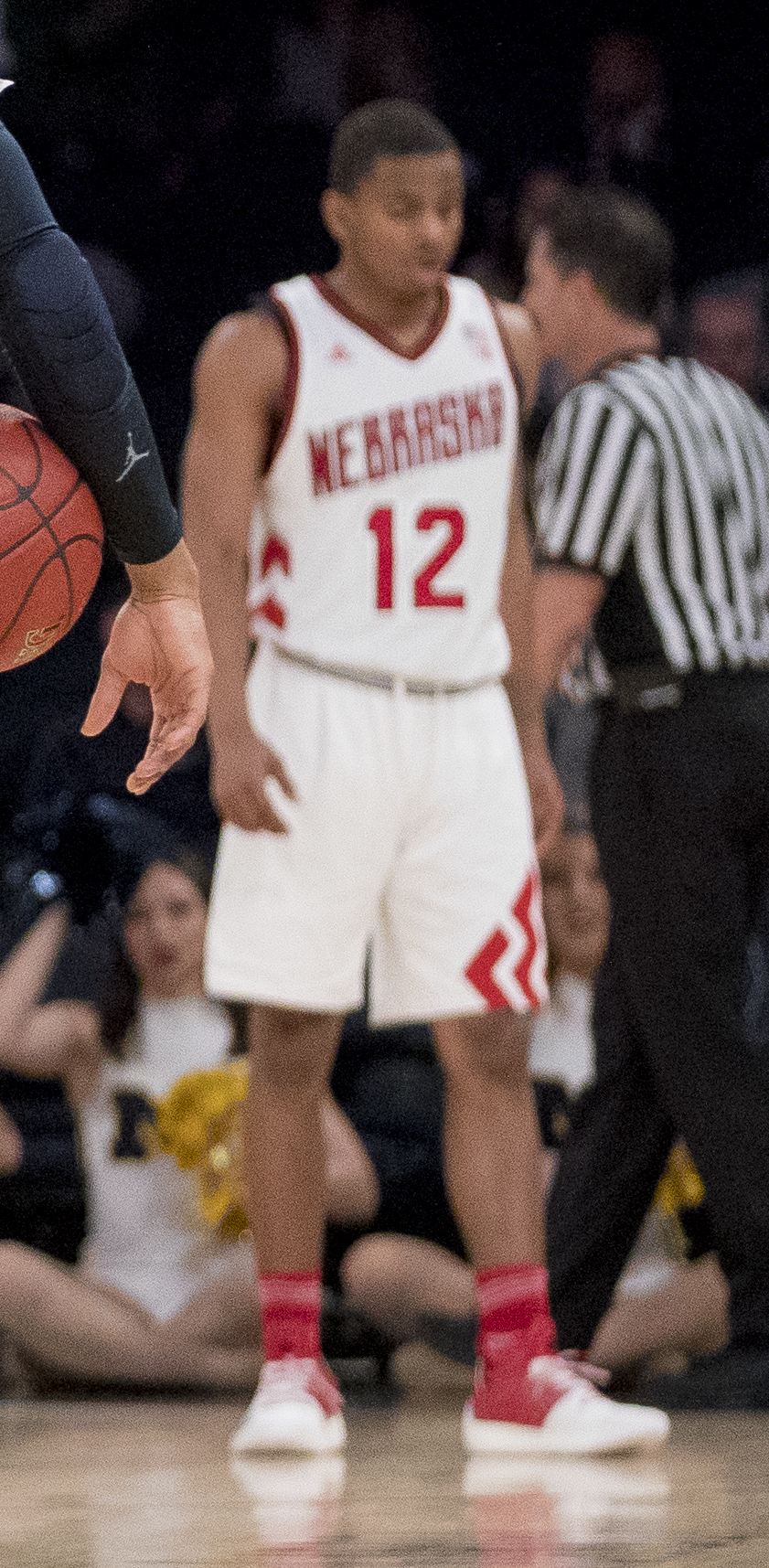

Personal information
- Born: October 21, 1998 (age 28) Raleigh, North Carolina, U.S.
- Listed height: 6 ft 1 in (1.85 m)
- Listed weight: 175 lb (79 kg)

Career information
- High school: Brewster Academy (Wolfeboro, New Hampshire)
- College: Nebraska (2017–2019); NC State (2020–2022)
- NBA draft: 2023: undrafted
- Position: Shooting guard

Thomas Allen (born October 21, 1998) is an American basketball player. He played college basketball for the NC State Wolfpack and Nebraska Cornhuskers.

== High school career ==
=== Recruiting ===
Allen was one of the nation's top high school shooters and was a consensus top-100 recruit for the class of 2018. A four-star prospect by ESPN, Scout and Rivals, Allen was rated the No. 9 prospect in New England by the New England Recruiting Report. He received offers from Campbell, Cincinnati, East Carolina, George Mason, High Point, Illinois, James Madison, Monmouth, Murray State, N.C. State, North Dakota, Nebraska, Ohio State, Old Dominion, Rhode Island, Saint Louis, Tennessee, Texas A&M, VCU, Virginia Tech, and Xavier. After official visits to N.C. State, Nebraska, and Saint Louis, Allen committed to N.C. State on October 2, 2016. On February 18, 2017, N.C. State announced head coach Mark Gottfried would not be retained following the 2016–17 season. Allen was granted his release on March 29, 2017, and decided to re-open his recruitment. Despite picking up a late offer from Kansas, Allen committed to Nebraska on April 21, 2017.

College recruiting
Name	Hometown	School	Height	Weight	Commit date
Thomas Allen; SG	Garner, NC	Brewster Academy (NH)	6 ft 1 in (1.85 m)	175 lb (79 kg)	Apr 21, 2017
Thomas Allen; SG	Recruit ratings: Scout: Rivals: 247Sports: ESPN:				
Overall recruit ranking: Scout: 102, 21 (SG) Rivals: 103, 21 (SG) 247Sports: 134, 26 (SG) ESPN: N/A, 26 (SG)
Note: In many cases, Scout, Rivals, 247Sports, On3, and ESPN may conflict in their listings of height and weight.; In these cases, the average was taken. ESPN grades are on a 100-point scale.; Sources: "2017 Nebraska Basketball Commitment List". Rivals.; "Men's Basketball Recruiting". Scout.; "ESPN - Nebraska Cornhuskers Basketball Recruiting 2017". ESPN.; "Scout.com Team Recruiting Rankings". Scout.; "2017 Team Ranking". Rivals.

== College career ==
Allen started the 2017–18 season coming off the bench for the Cornhuskers. On December 16, 2017, Allen scored a career-high 13 points (3–4 behind the arc) in 14 minutes against Kansas. He averaged 3.2 points per game as a freshman.

As a sophomore, Allen averaged 8.7 points, two assists and 1.3 steals per game. He injured his ankle on February 28, 2019, in a loss to Michigan forcing him to miss the rest of the season. Following the season, Allen announced he was transferring to NC State.

Allen averaged 7.4 points, 2.6 rebounds and 1.6 assists per game as a junior. He suffered an ankle injury in a loss to Duke on February 13, 2021, ending his season.

== Career statistics ==
Legend
GP	Games played	GS	Games started	MPG	Minutes per game
FG%	Field goal percentage	3P%	3-point field goal percentage	FT%	Free throw percentage
RPG	Rebounds per game	APG	Assists per game	SPG	Steals per game
BPG	Blocks per game	PPG	Points per game	**Bold**	Career high

=== College ===
Year	Team	GP	GS	MPG	FG%	3P%	FT%	RPG	APG	SPG	BPG	PPG
2017–18	Nebraska	**32**	0	9.9	.395	.354	.800	1.0	.5	.2	.0	3.2
2018–19	Nebraska	29	**25**	**30.2**	**.436**	.364	**.862**	**2.8**	**2.0**	**1.3**	**.2**	**8.7**
2019–20	NC State	Redshirt										
2020–21	NC State	17	15	26.5	.364	**.379**	.789	2.5	1.6	**1.3**	.1	7.4
2021–22	NC State	26	6	14.2	.359	.333	.700	1.2	1.1	.7	.1	3.8
Career		104	46	19.3	.398	.359	.808	1.8	1.3	.8	.1	5.6

== Personal life ==
Thomas is the son of Clarence and Tonya Simmons. He has one brother, Brandon Smith, and three sisters, Deshadia Allen, Tashari Allen and Racquel Simmons. Thomas was a marketing major at Nebraska.
