= 2017–18 Nebraska Cornhuskers men's basketball team =

American college basketball season

2017–18 Nebraska Cornhuskers men's basketball

NIT, First round
- Conference: Big Ten Conference
- Record: 22–11 (13–5 Big Ten)
- Head coach: Tim Miles (6th season)
- Assistant coaches: Kenya Hunter; Michael Lewis; Jim Molinari
- Home arena: Pinnacle Bank Arena

2017–18 Big Ten Conference men's basketball standings
	Conf.				Overall
Team	W		L	PCT	W		L	PCT
No. 5 Michigan State	16	–	2	.889	30	–	5	.857
No. 11 Purdue	15	–	3	.833	30	–	7	.811
No. 17 Ohio State	15	–	3	.833	25	–	9	.735
No. 7 Michigan †	13	–	5	.722	33	–	8	.805
Nebraska	13	–	5	.722	22	–	11	.667
Penn State	9	–	9	.500	26	–	13	.667
Indiana	9	–	9	.500	16	–	15	.516
Maryland	8	–	10	.444	19	–	13	.594
Wisconsin	7	–	11	.389	15	–	18	.455
Northwestern	6	–	12	.333	15	–	17	.469
Minnesota	4	–	14	.222	15	–	17	.469
Illinois	4	–	14	.222	14	–	18	.438
Iowa	4	–	14	.222	14	–	19	.424
Rutgers	3	–	15	.167	15	–	19	.441
† 2018 Big Ten tournament winner Rankings from AP poll

The 2017–18 Nebraska Cornhuskers men's basketball team represented the University of Nebraska–Lincoln in the 2017–18 NCAA Division I men's basketball season. The Cornhuskers were led by sixth-year coach head coach Tim Miles and played their home games at Pinnacle Bank Arena in Lincoln, Nebraska as members of the Big Ten Conference. They finished the season 22–11, 13–5 in Big Ten play to finish in a tie for fourth place. As the No. 4 seed in the Big Ten tournament, they lost in the quarterfinals to Michigan. Despite winning 13 Big Ten games, the Cornhuskers did not receive a bid to the NCAA tournament, but did receive a bid to the National Invitation Tournament. However, they lost in the first round of the NIT to Mississippi State.

== Previous season ==
The Cornhuskers finished the 2016–17 season 12–19, 6–12 in Big Ten play to finish in a tie for 12th place in conference. As the No. 12 seed in the Big Ten tournament, they lost in the first round to Penn State. This marked the fourth losing season in five years for coach Tim Miles. However, following the season, Nebraska athletic director Shawn Eichorst indicated that Tim Miles would return as head coach for Nebraska.

== Offseason ==
=== Departures ===
Name	No.	Pos.	Height	Weight	Year	Hometown	Notes
Tai Webster	0	G	6 ft 4 in	195 lb	Senior	Auckland, New Zealand	Graduated
Nick Fuller	23	F	6 ft 7 in	213 lb	Junior	Sun Prairie, WI	Graduate transferred to South Dakota
Michael Jacobson	12	F/C	6 ft 9 in	239 lb	Sophomore	Waukee, IA	Transferred to Iowa State
Ed Morrow, Jr.	30	F	6 ft 7 in	213 lb	Sophomore	Chicago, IL	Transferred to Marquette
Jason Shultis	3	G	6 ft 1 in	198 lb	Sophomore	Dannebrog, NE	Walk-on; left team.
Mohammad Elradi	21	G/F	6 ft 3 in	185 lb	Freshman	Omaha, NE	Walk-on; transferred to Northeastern JC
Jeriah Horne	2	F	6 ft 7 in	222 lb	Freshman	Overland Park, KS	Transferred to Tulsa

=== Arrivals ===
Name	No.	Pos.	Height	Weight	Year	Hometown	Notes
Duby Okeke	0	C	6 ft 8 in	230 lb	Senior	Jonesboro, GA	Graduate transferred from Winthrop. Under NCAA transfer rules, Okeke will be able to play immediately.
Isaac Copeland	14	F	6 ft 9 in	220 lb	Junior	Raleigh, NC	Transferred mid-season during previous season from Georgetown. Was granted a medical redshirt for the 2016-17 season and has received a medical hardship waiver for the 2017-18 season. Under NCAA transfer rules with the granted waiver, Copeland will be able to play immediately this season with two full years of remaining eligibility.
Johnny Trueblood	4	G	6 ft 4 in	195 lb	Sophomore	Elkhorn, NE	Walk-on. Left team after 2015–16 season and but stayed at Nebraska; Returned to team in July 2017 after one season away.

=== 2017 recruiting class ===
College recruiting
Name	Hometown	School	Height	Weight	Commit date
Nana Akenten; SG	Bolingbrook, IL	Bolingbrook HS	6 ft 6 in (1.98 m)	195 lb (88 kg)	Sep 15, 2016
Nana Akenten; SG	Recruit ratings: Scout: Rivals: 247Sports: ESPN: (N/A)				
Thomas Allen; SG	Garner, NC	Brewster Academy	6 ft 1 in (1.85 m)	155 lb (70 kg)	Apr 21, 2017
Thomas Allen; SG	Recruit ratings: Scout: Rivals: 247Sports: ESPN: (83)				
Justin Costello; SG, PG (Walk-on)	Elkhorn, NE	Elkhorn South HS	6 ft 2 in (1.88 m)	180 lb (82 kg)	Feb 7, 2017
Justin Costello; SG, PG (Walk-on)	Recruit ratings: Scout: Rivals: 247Sports: ESPN: (N/A)				
Þórir Þorbjarnarson; SG	Akureyri, Iceland	Menntaskólinn í Reykjavík	6 ft 5 in (1.96 m)	190 lb (86 kg)	Aug 7, 2017
Þórir Þorbjarnarson; SG	Recruit ratings: Scout: Rivals: 247Sports: ESPN: (N/A)				
Overall recruit ranking: 247Sports: 64
Note: In many cases, Scout, Rivals, 247Sports, On3, and ESPN may conflict in their listings of height and weight.; In these cases, the average was taken. ESPN grades are on a 100-point scale.; Sources: "2017 Team Ranking". Rivals.

== Roster ==
2017–18 Nebraska Cornhuskers men's basketball team
Players
Coaches

Pos.	#	Name	Height	Weight	Year	Previous school	Hometown
C	0	Duby Okeke	6 ft 8 in (2.03 m)	247 lb (112 kg)	Sr	Winthrop	Jonesboro, GA
G	3	Malcolm Laws (W)	6 ft 1 in (1.85 m)	191 lb (87 kg)	RS Sr	Florida Atlantic	Orlando, FL
G	4	Johnny Trueblood (W)	6 ft 3 in (1.91 m)	192 lb (87 kg)	So	Elkhorn South High School	Elkhorn, NE
G	5	Glynn Watson Jr.	6 ft 0 in (1.83 m)	173 lb (78 kg)	Jr	St. Joseph High School	Bellwood, IL
F	10	Jack McVeigh	6 ft 8 in (2.03 m)	215 lb (98 kg)	Jr	Australian Institute of Sport	Cabarita Beach, NSW, Australia
G	11	Evan Taylor	6 ft 5 in (1.96 m)	206 lb (93 kg)	RS Sr	Odessa College	Cincinnati, OH
G	12	Thomas Allen	6 ft 1 in (1.85 m)	180 lb (82 kg)	Fr	Brewster Academy	Garner, NC
G	13	Anton Gill	6 ft 3 in (1.91 m)	195 lb (88 kg)	RS Sr	Louisville	Raleigh, NC
F	14	Isaac Copeland	6 ft 9 in (2.06 m)	221 lb (100 kg)	RS Jr	Georgetown	Raleigh, NC
F	15	Isaiah Roby	6 ft 8 in (2.03 m)	226 lb (103 kg)	So	Dixon High School	Dixon, IL
F	20	Tanner Borchardt	6 ft 8 in (2.03 m)	265 lb (120 kg)	Jr	Gothenburg High School	Gothenburg, NE
G	24	James Palmer Jr.	6 ft 6 in (1.98 m)	210 lb (95 kg)	RS Jr	Miami (FL)	Upper Marlboro, MD
G	25	Nana Akenten	6 ft 6 in (1.98 m)	215 lb (98 kg)	Fr	Bolingbrook High School	Bolingbrook, IL
C	32	Jordy Tshimanga	6 ft 11 in (2.11 m)	268 lb (122 kg)	So	The MacDuffie School	Montreal, QC, Canada
G	33	Justin Costello (W) (redshirt)	6 ft 1 in (1.85 m)	180 lb (82 kg)	Fr	Elkhorn South High School	Elkhorn, NE
G	34	Þórir Þorbjarnarson	6 ft 5 in (1.96 m)	194 lb (88 kg)	Fr	Menntaskólinn í Reykjavík	Akureyri, Iceland

Head coach

- Tim Miles (Mary)

Assistant coach(es)

- Kenya Hunter (Duquesne)
- Michael Lewis (Indiana)
- Jim Molinari (Illinois Wesleyan)

Legend

- (C) Team captain
- (S) Suspended
- (I) Ineligible
- (W) Walk-on
- Injured
- Current redshirt

Roster

== Schedule and results ==
The 2018 Big Ten tournament was held at Madison Square Garden in New York City. Due to the Big East's use of that venue for their conference tournament, the Big Ten tournament took place one week earlier than usual, ending the week before Selection Sunday. This meant qualifying teams had nearly two weeks off before the NCAA tournament. As a result, the Big Ten regular season began in mid-December. Coaches requested that no Big Ten game be scheduled between Christmas and New Year's Day; accordingly, each team played two conference games in early December before finishing non-conference play.

On October 18, 2017, the school announced that it would play a charity exhibition game against Mississippi State on October 22 in Starkville, Mississippi to raise money for hurricane victims.

Date time, TV	Rank^{#}	Opponent^{#}	Result	Record	High points	High rebounds	High assists	Site (attendance) city, state
Exhibition
Oct 22, 2017*; 1:00 pm		at Mississippi State; Hurricane Irma charity game	W 76–72	–	17 – Palmer	8 – Roby	5 – Watson	Humphrey Coliseum; Starkville, MS
Nov 7, 2017*; 7:00 pm, BTN Plus		Northwood	W 80–62	–	27 – Palmer	7 – Tshimanga	4 – Allen/Palmer	Pinnacle Bank Arena (7,294); Lincoln, NE
Regular season
Nov 11, 2017*; 7:30 pm, BTN Plus		Eastern Illinois	W 72–68	1–0	21 – Watson	13 – Roby	3 – Watson	Pinnacle Bank Arena (11,104); Lincoln, NE
Nov 13, 2017*; 7:00 pm, BTN Plus		North Texas	W 86–67	2–0	18 – Palmer	8 – Copeland	2 – 5 tied	Pinnacle Bank Arena (9,028); Lincoln, NE
Nov 16, 2017*; 5:30 pm, FS1		at St. John's; Gavitt Tipoff Games	L 56–79	2–1	13 – Palmer	7 – Copeland	3 – Palmer	Carnesecca Arena (4,652); Queens, New York City, NY
Nov 19, 2017*; 1:00 pm, BTN		North Dakota	W 92–70	3–1	30 – Copeland	8 – Copeland	5 – Taylor	Pinnacle Bank Arena (10,249); Lincoln, NE
Nov 23, 2017*; 5:00 pm, ESPN3		vs. UCF; AdvoCare Invitational quarterfinals	L 59–68	3–2	22 – Palmer	10 – Tshimanga	7 – Watson	HP Field House (3,348); Lake Buena Vista, FL
Nov 24, 2017*; 6:30 pm, ESPN3		vs. Marist; AdvoCare Invitational consolation 2nd round	W 84–59	4–2	17 – Copeland/Gill	6 – Tshimanga	5 – Taylor/Watson	HP Field House (2,834); Lake Buena Vista, FL
Nov 26, 2017*; 1:00 pm, ESPNU		vs. Long Beach State; AdvoCare Invitational 5th place game	W 85–80	5–2	26 – Watson	7 – Copeland	6 – Taylor	HP Field House (1,712); Lake Buena Vista, FL
Nov 29, 2017*; 8:15 pm, ESPNU		Boston College; ACC–Big Ten Challenge	W 71–62	6–2	15 – Copeland/Palmer	8 – Copeland	6 – Watson	Pinnacle Bank Arena (10,742); Lincoln, NE
Dec 3, 2017; 3:30 pm, FS1		at No. 3 Michigan State	L 57–86	6–3 (0–1)	15 – Palmer	5 – Gill/Taylor	3 – Palmer	Breslin Center (14,797); East Lansing, MI
Dec 5, 2017; 8:00 pm, BTN		No. 14 Minnesota	W 78–68	7–3 (1–1)	29 – Watson	9 – Watson	4 – Palmer	Pinnacle Bank Arena (13,847); Lincoln, NE
Dec 9, 2017*; 1:30 pm, FS1		at Creighton; Rivalry	L 65–75	7–4	20 – Copeland	11 – Copeland	5 – Taylor/Watson	CenturyLink Center Omaha (17,901); Omaha, NE
Dec 16, 2017*; 7:00 pm, FS1		No. 13 Kansas; Shelter Insurance Showcase	L 72–73	7–5	14 – Palmer	9 – Copeland	4 – Taylor	Pinnacle Bank Arena (15,207); Lincoln, NE
Dec 20, 2017*; 7:00 pm, BTN		UTSA	W 104–94	8–5	25 – Palmer	8 – Copeland	4 – Copeland/Taylor	Pinnacle Bank Arena (10,032); Lincoln, NE
Dec 22, 2017*; 7:00 pm, BTN Plus		Delaware State	W 85–68	9–5	18 – Palmer	9 – Roby	6 – Gill	Pinnacle Bank Arena (10,431); Lincoln, NE
Dec 29, 2017*; 7:00 pm, BTN Plus		Stetson	W 71–62	10–5	13 – Copeland/Palmer	10 – Borchardt/Tshimanga	4 – Palmer/Taylor	Pinnacle Bank Arena (11,284); Lincoln, NE
Jan 2, 2018; 8:00 pm, BTN		at Northwestern	W 70–55	11–5 (2–1)	19 – Watson	8 – Copeland	6 – Watson	Allstate Arena (5,443); Rosemont, IL
Jan 6, 2018; 1:15 pm, BTN		at No. 13 Purdue	L 62–74	11–6 (2–2)	22 – Palmer	7 – Palmer	3 – Palmer	Mackey Arena (14,804); West Lafayette, IN
Jan 9, 2018; 7:30 pm, BTN		Wisconsin	W 63–59	12–6 (3–2)	18 – Palmer	8 – Roby	3 – Watson	Pinnacle Bank Arena (13,497); Lincoln, NE
Jan 12, 2018; 6:00 pm, BTN		at Penn State	L 74–76 ^{OT}	12–7 (3–3)	21 – Copeland/Watson	8 – Copeland	3 – Palmer	Bryce Jordan Center (6,821); University Park, PA
Jan 15, 2018; 8:00 pm, BTN		Illinois	W 64–63	13–7 (4–3)	24 – Palmer	10 – Roby	3 – Watson	Pinnacle Bank Arena (12,597); Lincoln, NE
Jan 18, 2018; 8:00 pm, BTN		No. 23 Michigan	W 72–52	14–7 (5–3)	19 – Palmer	7 – Taylor	3 – Roby	Pinnacle Bank Arena (14,589); Lincoln, NE
Jan 22, 2018; 7:00 pm, BTN		at No. 13 Ohio State	L 59–64	14–8 (5–4)	34 – Palmer	8 – Roby	2 – Palmer/Watson	Value City Arena (10,918); Columbus, OH
Jan 24, 2018; 6:00 pm, BTN		at Rutgers	W 60–54	15–8 (6–4)	23 – Copeland	8 – Roby	4 – Palmer	Louis Brown Athletic Center (4,075); Piscataway, NJ
Jan 27, 2018; 7:00 pm, BTN		Iowa	W 98–84	16–8 (7–4)	28 – Palmer	11 – Copeland	5 – Palmer	Pinnacle Bank Arena (15,952); Lincoln, NE
Jan 29, 2018; 8:00 pm, BTN		at Wisconsin	W 74–63	17–8 (8–4)	28 – Palmer	8 – Palmer	5 – Watson	Kohl Center (17,287); Madison, WI
Feb 6, 2018; 8:00 pm, BTN		at Minnesota	W 91–85	18–8 (9–4)	21 – Roby	8 – Roby	9 – Palmer	Williams Arena (11,193); Minneapolis, MN
Feb 10, 2018; 3:00 pm, BTN		Rutgers	W 67-55	19–8 (10–4)	15 – Palmer	11 – Roby	4 – Palmer/Taylor	Pinnacle Bank Arena (15,867); Lincoln, NE
Feb 13, 2018; 6:00 pm, BTN		Maryland	W 70–66	20–8 (11–4)	26 – Palmer	10 – Roby	5 – Palmer	Pinnacle Bank Arena (15,908); Lincoln, NE
Feb 18, 2018; 2:30 pm, BTN		at Illinois	L 66–72	20–9 (11–5)	17 – Copeland	10 – Roby	4 – Palmer/Watson	State Farm Center (15,544); Champaign, IL
Feb 20, 2018; 8:00 pm, BTN		Indiana	W 66–57	21–9 (12–5)	15 – Palmer	9 – Roby/Tshimanga	5 – Watson	Pinnacle Bank Arena (15,859); Lincoln, NE
Feb 25, 2018; 4:15 pm, BTN		Penn State	W 76–64	22–9 (13–5)	17 – Copeland	12 – Copeland	4 – Copeland	Pinnacle Bank Arena (15,991); Lincoln, NE
Big Ten tournament
Mar 2, 2018; 2:30 pm, BTN	(4)	vs. (5) No. 15 Michigan; Quarterfinals	L 58–77	22–10	16 – Palmer/Roby	7 – Roby	2 – Palmer/Watson	Madison Square Garden (14,260); New York City, NY
NIT
Mar 14, 2018*; 8:00 pm, ESPN2	(5)	at (4) Mississippi State; First round – Baylor Bracket	L 59–66	22–11	13 – Palmer	8 – Roby	5 – Palmer	Humphrey Coliseum (3,485); Starkville, MS
*Non-conference game. ^{#}Rankings from AP Poll. (#) Tournament seedings in parentheses. All times are in Central Time.
