= 2017–18 Penn State Nittany Lions basketball team =

American college basketball season

2017–18 Penn State Nittany Lions basketball

NIT Champions
- Conference: Big Ten Conference
- Record: 26–13 (9–9 Big Ten)
- Head coach: Pat Chambers (7th season)
- Associate head coach: Keith Urgo
- Assistant coaches: Dwayne Anderson; Jim Ferry
- Home arena: Bryce Jordan Center

2017–18 Big Ten Conference men's basketball standings
	Conf.				Overall
Team	W		L	PCT	W		L	PCT
No. 5 Michigan State	16	–	2	.889	30	–	5	.857
No. 11 Purdue	15	–	3	.833	30	–	7	.811
No. 17 Ohio State	15	–	3	.833	25	–	9	.735
No. 7 Michigan †	13	–	5	.722	33	–	8	.805
Nebraska	13	–	5	.722	22	–	11	.667
Penn State	9	–	9	.500	26	–	13	.667
Indiana	9	–	9	.500	16	–	15	.516
Maryland	8	–	10	.444	19	–	13	.594
Wisconsin	7	–	11	.389	15	–	18	.455
Northwestern	6	–	12	.333	15	–	17	.469
Minnesota	4	–	14	.222	15	–	17	.469
Illinois	4	–	14	.222	14	–	18	.438
Iowa	4	–	14	.222	14	–	19	.424
Rutgers	3	–	15	.167	15	–	19	.441
† 2018 Big Ten tournament winner Rankings from AP poll

The 2017–18 Penn State Nittany Lions basketball team represented Pennsylvania State University in the 2017–18 NCAA Division I men's basketball season. They are led by head coach Pat Chambers, in his seventh season with the team, and played their home games at the Bryce Jordan Center in University Park, Pennsylvania as members of the Big Ten Conference. They finished the season 26–13, 9–9 in Big Ten play to finish in a tie for sixth place. In the Big Ten tournament, they defeated Northwestern and Ohio State before losing to Purdue in the semifinals. They received a bid to the National Invitation Tournament where they defeated Temple, Notre Dame, Marquette, and Mississippi State to advance to the NIT championship where they defeated Utah to become NIT champions.

== Previous season ==
The Nittany Lions finished the 2016–17 season 15–18, 6–12 in Big Ten play to finish in a tie for 12th place. As the No. 13 seed in the Big Ten tournament, they beat Nebraska in the first round before losing to Michigan State in the second round.

== Offseason ==
=== Departures ===
Name	Number	Pos.	Height	Weight	Year	Hometown	Notes
Payton Banks	0	F	6'6"	223	RS Junior	Orange, CA	Graduate transferred to South Florida
Terrence Samuel	5	G	6'3"	208	RS Junior	Brooklyn, NY	Graduate transferred to South Florida
Isaiah Washington	21	G	6'2"	163	RS Sophomore	Williamsport, PA	Graduate transferred to Quinnpiac

=== 2017 recruiting class ===
College recruiting information
Name	Hometown	School	Height	Weight	Commit date
Jamari Wheeler; PG	Live Oak, FL	The Rock School	6 ft 1 in (1.85 m)	170 lb (77 kg)	
Jamari Wheeler; PG	Recruit ratings: No ratings found				
Taylor Nussbaum; PG	South Salem, NY	Cheshire Academy	6 ft 1 in (1.85 m)	N/A	
Taylor Nussbaum; PG	Recruit ratings: 247Sports:				
Trent Buttrick; PF	Naples, FL	Community School of Naples	6 ft 8 in (2.03 m)	220 lb (100 kg)	
Trent Buttrick; PF	Recruit ratings: 247Sports:				
John Harrar; PF	Wallingford, PA	Strath Haven High School	6 ft 9 in (2.06 m)	240 lb (110 kg)	
John Harrar; PF	Recruit ratings: No ratings found				
Overall recruit ranking:
Note: In many cases, Scout, Rivals, 247Sports, On3, and ESPN may conflict in their listings of height and weight.; In these cases, the average was taken. ESPN grades are on a 100-point scale.; Sources: "2016 Team Ranking". Rivals.

=== 2018 recruiting class ===
College recruiting information (2018)
Name	Hometown	School	Height	Weight	Commit date
Myles Dread; CG	Burtonsville, MD	Gonzaga College High School	6 ft 4 in (1.93 m)	205 lb (93 kg)	Jul 10, 2016
Myles Dread; CG	Recruit ratings: Scout: Rivals: 247Sports: ESPN:				
Rasir Bolton; PG	Virginia Beach, VA	Huntington Prep	6 ft 3 in (1.91 m)	170 lb (77 kg)	Jul 23, 2017
Rasir Bolton; PG	Recruit ratings: Scout: Rivals: 247Sports: ESPN:				
Daniil Kasatkin; PG	Ivanovo, Russia	Mountain Mission	6 ft 8 in (2.03 m)	220 lb (100 kg)	Nov 21, 2017
Daniil Kasatkin; PG	Recruit ratings: Scout: Rivals: 247Sports: ESPN:				
Myreon Jones; CG	Birmingham, AL	Lincoln Academy	6 ft 3 in (1.91 m)	170 lb (77 kg)	May 2, 2018
Myreon Jones; CG	Recruit ratings: Scout: Rivals: 247Sports: ESPN:				
Overall recruit ranking:
Note: In many cases, Scout, Rivals, 247Sports, On3, and ESPN may conflict in their listings of height and weight.; In these cases, the average was taken. ESPN grades are on a 100-point scale.; Sources: "2018 Team Ranking". Rivals.

== Personnel ==
=== Roster ===
2017–18 Penn State Nittany Lions men's basketball team
Players
Coaches

Pos.	#	Name	Height	Weight	Year	Previous school	Hometown
F	1	Deividas Zemgulis	6 ft 6 in (1.98 m)	220 lb (100 kg)	Jr	St. Mary Ryken	Kaunas, Lithuania
F	3	Satchel Pierce	7 ft 0 in (2.13 m)	266 lb (121 kg)	RS Jr	The Kiski School; Virginia Tech	Barberton, OH
G	4	Nazeer Bostick	6 ft 4 in (1.93 m)	203 lb (92 kg)	So	Roman Catholic	Philadelphia, PA
G	5	Jamari Wheeler	6 ft 1 in (1.85 m)	170 lb (77 kg)	Fr	Rock School	Gainesville, FL
G	10	Tony Carr	6 ft 5 in (1.96 m)	204 lb (93 kg)	So	Roman Catholic	Philadelphia, PA
F	11	Lamar Stevens	6 ft 7 in (2.01 m)	226 lb (103 kg)	So	Roman Catholic	Philadelphia, PA
F	21	John Harrar	6 ft 9 in (2.06 m)	243 lb (110 kg)	Fr	Strath Haven	Atlanta, GA
F	22	Grant Hazle (W)	6 ft 5 in (1.96 m)	192 lb (87 kg)	So	Westbury Christian	Kingwood, TX
G	23	Josh Reaves	6 ft 4 in (1.93 m)	210 lb (95 kg)	Jr	Oak Hill Academy	Fairfax, VA
F	24	Mike Watkins	6 ft 9 in (2.06 m)	254 lb (115 kg)	RS So	Phelps School	Philadelphia, PA
G	33	Shep Garner	6 ft 2 in (1.88 m)	196 lb (89 kg)	Sr	Roman Catholic HS	Philadelphia, PA
F	35	Trent Buttrick	6 ft 8 in (2.03 m)	234 lb (106 kg)	Fr	Community School of Naples (Fla.)	Bloomsburg, PA
F	44	Julian Moore	6 ft 10 in (2.08 m)	248 lb (112 kg)	RS Sr	Germantown Acad	Fort Washington, PA

Head coach

- Pat Chambers (Philadelphia)

Assistant coach(es)

- Keith Urgo (Fairfield)
- Dwayne Anderson (Villanova)
- Jim Ferry (Keene State)

Legend

- (C) Team captain
- (S) Suspended
- (I) Ineligible
- (W) Walk-on
- Injured
- Current redshirt

Roster

=== Coaching staff ===
Position	Name	Year	Alma mater
Head coach	Patrick Chambers	2011	Philadelphia University (1994)
Associate head coach	Keith Urgo	2011	Fairfield University (2002)
Assistant coach	Dwayne Anderson	2013	Villanova University (2009)
Assistant coach	Jim Ferry	2017	Keene State (1990)
Director of Basketball Operations	Ross Condon	2011	Villanova University (2007)
On campus recruiting coordinator	Nicholas Colella	2015	Penn State (2013)
Athletic trainer	Jon Salazer	2001	Penn State (1993)
Director of player development	David Caporaletti	2011	Philadelphia University (1993)
Strength and conditioning coach	Greg Miskinis	2009	Penn State (2008)
Graduate Manager	Stephen Griffin	2017	Philadelphia University (2014)
Graduate Manager	Nick Higgins	2017	Penn State (2017)

== Schedule and results ==
The 2018 Big Ten tournament was held at Madison Square Garden in New York City. Due to the Big East's use of that venue for their conference tournament, the Big Ten tournament took place one week earlier than usual, ending the week before Selection Sunday.

Date time, TV	Rank^{#}	Opponent^{#}	Result	Record	High points	High rebounds	High assists	Site (attendance) city, state
Bahamas exhibition trip
Aug 6, 2017*; 2:00 pm		vs. New Providence Basketball; Association All-Stars; Summer of Thunder Tour	W 109–105 ^{OT}		26 – Carr	12 – Pierce	7 – Carr	Sir Kendal Isaac's National Gymnasium; Queen Elizabeth Sports Centre; Nassau, Bahamas
Aug 8, 2017*; 6:00 pm		vs. Providence Storm; Summer of Thunder Tour	W 112–63		28 – Garner	10 – Pierce	3 – 3 tied	Sir Kendal Isaac's National Gymnasium; Queen Elizabeth Sports Centre; Nassau, Bahamas
Aug 9, 2017*; 2:00 pm		vs. Bahamas All-Stars; Summer of Thunder Tour – Cancelled						Sir Kendal Isaac's National Gymnasium; Queen Elizabeth Sports Centre; Nassau, Bahamas
Exhibition
Nov 4, 2017*; 1:00 pm		at Lafayette; OAA hurricane relief benefit	W 102–80	–	23 – Carr	6 – Reaves	2 – 5 tied	Kirby Sports Center; Easton, PA
Nov 5, 2017*; 12:00 pm, BTN+		Bloomsburg	W 84–67	–	17 – Garner	8 – Stevens	7 – Carr	Bryce Jordan Center (3,826); University Park, PA
Regular season
Nov 10, 2017*; 4:00 pm, BTN+		Campbell	W 86–75	1–0	33 – Carr	9 – Carr	7 – Carr	Bryce Jordan Center; University Park, PA
Nov 12, 2017*; 5:00 pm, BTN+		Fairleigh Dickinson	W 81–57	2–0	20 – Carr	9 – Reaves	7 – Carr	Bryce Jordan Center (5,802); University Park, PA
Nov 15, 2017*; 7:00 pm, BTN		Montana; Legends Classic campus site game	W 70–57	3–0	25 – Stevens	7 – Stevens	3 – Garner	Bryce Jordan Center (5,854); University Park, PA
Nov 17, 2017*; 7:00 pm, BTN+		Columbia	W 79–65	4–0	26 – Garner	14 – Watkins	4 – Wheeler	Bryce Jordan Center (6,529); University Park, PA
Nov 20, 2017*; 9:30 pm, ESPN3		vs. Pittsburgh; Legends Classic semifinals	W 85–54	5–0	16 – Carr	8 – Stevens	5 – Carr	Barclays Center (5,904); Brooklyn, NY
Nov 21, 2017*; 6:00 pm, ESPN2		vs. No. 16 Texas A&M; Legends Classic championship	L 87–98	5–1	31 – Carr	7 – Stevens	4 – Tied	Barclays Center (5,081); Brooklyn, NY
Nov 24, 2017*; 3:00 pm, BTN+		Oral Roberts; Legends Classic campus site game	W 86–48	6–1	14 – Wheeler/Bostick	7 – Wheeler	5 – Carr	Bryce Jordan Center (4,463); University Park, PA
Nov 29, 2017*; 7:00 pm, ESPNU		at NC State; ACC–Big Ten Challenge	L 78–85	6–2	29 – Carr	14 – Watkins	5 – Reaves	PNC Arena (15,270); Raleigh, NC
Dec 2, 2017; 5:00 pm, BTN		at Iowa	W 77–73	7–2 (1–0)	22 – Stevens	7 – Watkins	9 – Carr	Carver–Hawkeye Arena (12,805); Iowa City, IA
Dec 4, 2017; 7:00 pm, ESPN2		Wisconsin	L 63–64	7–3 (1–1)	22 – Watkins	9 – Carr	5 – Reaves	Bryce Jordan Center (6,730); University Park, PA
Dec 9, 2017*; 4:00 pm, BTN		George Washington	W 74–54	8–3	19 – Carr	12 – Watkins	4 – Carr	Bryce Jordan Center (6,652); University Park, PA
Dec 17, 2017*; 4:00 pm, Stadium		at George Mason	W 72–54	9–3	23 – Stevens	12 – Tied	4 – Reaves	EagleBank Arena (5,439); Fairfax, VA
Dec 19, 2017*; 7:00 pm, BTN+		Binghamton	W 80–65	10–3	16 – Stevens	11 – Watkins	9 – Carr	Bryce Jordan Center (4,009); University Park, PA
Dec 22, 2017*; 7:00 pm, BTN		Rider	L 70–71	10–4	18 – Garner	13 – Reaves	8 – Reaves	Bryce Jordan Center (4,217); University Park, PA
Dec 30, 2017*; 1:00 pm, BTN+		Coppin State	W 88–43	11–4	21 – Carr	7 – Wheeler	7 – Reaves	Bryce Jordan Center (4,512); University Park, PA
Jan 2, 2018; 7:00 pm, BTN		at Maryland	L 69–75	11–5 (1–2)	17 – Watkins	17 – Watkins	8 – Carr	Xfinity Center (14,374); College Park, MD
Jan 5, 2018; 8:00 pm, FS1		Northwestern	W 78–63	12–5 (2–2)	30 – Stevens	17 – Watkins	5 – Carr	Bryce Jordan Center (4,682); University Park, PA
Jan 9, 2018; 6:30 pm, BTN		at Indiana	L 70–74	12–6 (2–3)	28 – Carr	12 – Watkins	3 – Carr	Simon Skjodt Assembly Hall (17,222); Bloomington, IN
Jan 12, 2018; 7:00 pm, BTN		Nebraska	W 76–74 ^{OT}	13–6 (3–3)	26 – Stevens	15 – Watkins	8 – Carr	Bryce Jordan Center (6,821); University Park, PA
Jan 15, 2018; 7:00 pm, BTN		Minnesota	L 84–95 ^{OT}	13–7 (3–4)	33 – Carr	11 – Watkins	3 – Tied	Bryce Jordan Center (6,361); University Park, PA
Jan 20, 2018; 2:00 pm, BTN		at Northwestern	L 61–70	13–8 (3–5)	22 – Garner	8 – Watkins	6 – Carr	Allstate Arena; Rosemont, IL
Jan 25, 2018; 8:00 pm, BTN		at No. 13 Ohio State	W 82–79	14–8 (4–5)	28 – Carr	6 – Stevens	5 – Carr	Value City Arena (13,464); Columbus, OH
Jan 27, 2018; 4:00 pm, BTN		Rutgers	W 60–43	15–8 (5–5)	16 – Carr	19 – Watkins	4 – Carr	Bryce Jordan Center (13,677); University Park, PA
Jan 31, 2018; 6:30 pm, BTN		at No. 5 Michigan State	L 68–76	15–9 (5–6)	28 – Carr	7 – Reaves	7 – Carr	Breslin Center (14,797); East Lansing, MI
Feb 3, 2018; 6:00 pm, BTN		Iowa	W 82-58	16–9 (6–6)	19 – Watkins	10 – Watkins	5 – Reaves	Bryce Jordan Center (10,394); University Park, PA
Feb 7, 2018; 6:30 pm, BTN		Maryland	W 74–70	17–9 (7–6)	25 – Stevens	9 – Reaves	6 – Carr	Bryce Jordan Center (8,435); University Park, PA
Feb 11, 2018; 7:00 pm, BTN		at Illinois	W 74–52	18–9 (8–6)	16 – Garner	6 – 2 tied	6 – Carr	State Farm Center (12,840); Champaign, IL
Feb 15, 2018; 8:00 pm, BTN		No. 8 Ohio State	W 79–56	19–9 (9–6)	30 – Carr	10 – Watkins	6 – Reaves	Bryce Jordan Center (10,981); University Park, PA
Feb 18, 2018; 8:00 pm, BTN		at No. 6 Purdue	L 73–76	19–10 (9–7)	19 – Carr	7 – Reaves	5 – 2 tied	Mackey Arena (14,804); West Lafayette, IN
Feb 21, 2018; 7:00 pm, BTN		No. 17 Michigan	L 63–72	19–11 (9–8)	21 – Carr	8 – Stevens	6 – Carr	Bryce Jordan Center (13,586); University Park, PA
Feb 25, 2018; 5:15 pm, BTN		at Nebraska	L 64–76	19–12 (9–9)	27 – Carr	7 – Reaves/Stevens	3 – Reaves	Pinnacle Bank Arena (15,991); Lincoln, NE
Big Ten tournament
Mar 1, 2018; 6:30 pm, BTN	(7)	vs. (10) Northwestern; Second Round	W 65–57	20–12	25 – Carr	8 – Reaves	4 – Carr	Madison Square Garden (13,996); New York City, NY
Mar 2, 2018; 6:30 pm, BTN	(7)	vs. (2) No. 13 Ohio State; Quarterfinals	W 69–68	21–12	25 – Carr	7 – Stevens	5 – Carr	Madison Square Garden (14,530); New York City, NY
Mar 3, 2018; 4:30 pm, CBS	(7)	vs. (3) No. 8 Purdue; Semifinals	L 70–78	21–13	33 – Garner	9 – Carr	4 – Carr	Madison Square Garden (19,812); New York City, NY
NIT
Mar 14, 2018*; 8:00 pm, ESPNU	(4)	(5) Temple; First Round – Notre Dame Bracket	W 63–57	22–13	19 – Reaves	11 – Reaves	5 – Reaves	Bryce Jordan Center (4,528); University Park, PA
Mar 17, 2018*; 12:00 pm, ESPN	(4)	at (1) Notre Dame; Second Round – Notre Dame Bracket	W 73–63	23–13	24 – Carr	9 – Reaves	4 – Carr	Edmund P. Joyce Center (4,023); Notre Dame, IN
Mar 20, 2018*; 7:00 pm, ESPN	(4)	at (2) Marquette; Quarterfinals – Notre Dame Bracket	W 85–80	24–13	30 – Stevens	9 – Harrar	7 – Carr	Al McGuire Center (3,670); Milwaukee, WI
Mar 27, 2018*; 7:00 pm, ESPN	(4)	vs. (4) Mississippi State; Semifinals	W 75–60	25–13	21 – Carr	8 – Stevens	6 – Stevens	Madison Square Garden (7,865); New York City, NY
Mar 29, 2018*; 7:00 pm, ESPN	(4)	vs. (2) Utah; Championship	W 82–66	26–13	28 – Stevens	12 – Harrar	14 – Carr	Madison Square Garden (11,175); New York City, NY
*Non-conference game. ^{#}Rankings from AP Poll. (#) Tournament seedings in parentheses. All times are in Eastern Time.
