= DeAndre Haynes =

American basketball player and coach

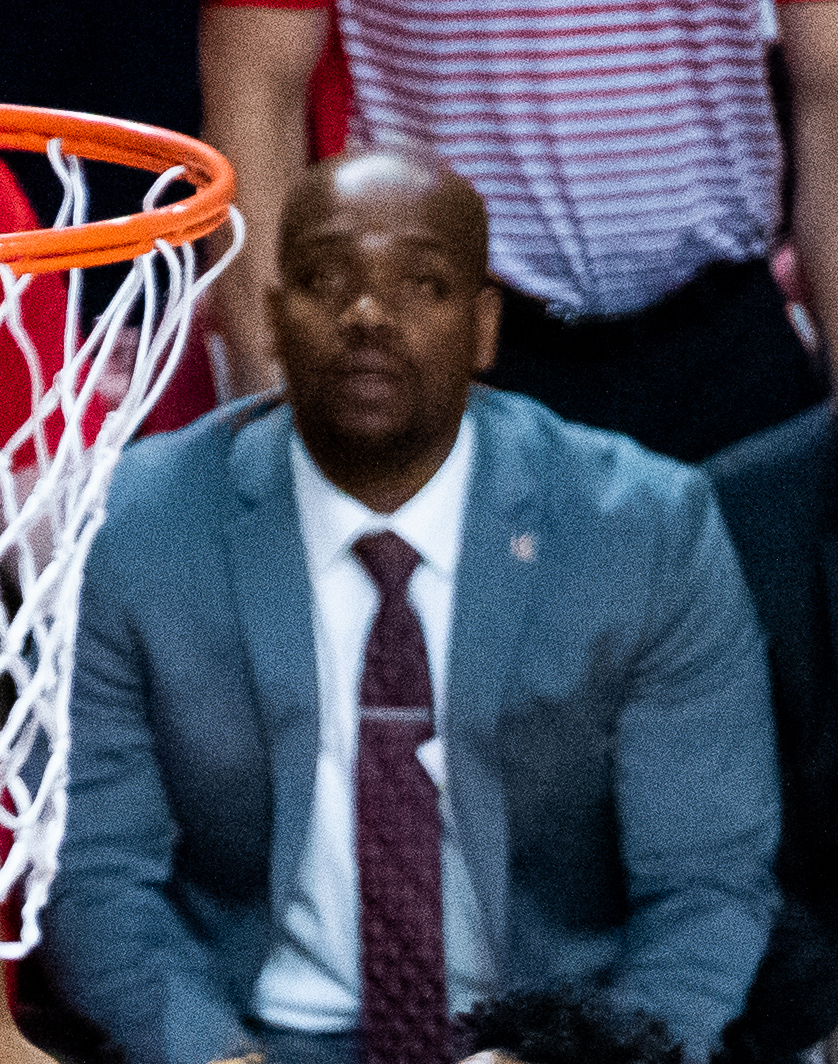

Washington Huskies
- Title: Assistant coach
- League: Big Ten Conference

Personal information
- Born: March 30, 1984 (age 42) Detroit, Michigan, U.S.
- Listed height: 6 ft 2 in (1.88 m)
- Listed weight: 185 lb (84 kg)

Career information
- High school: Southwestern (Detroit, Michigan)
- College: Kent State (2002–2006)
- NBA draft: 2006: undrafted
- Playing career: 2006–2012
- Position: Point guard
- Coaching career: 2012–present

Career history

Playing
- 2006–2007: Atomia Brussels
- 2007–2008: Okapi Aalstar
- 2008–2009: Kecskeméti KSE
- 2009–2010: Paderborn Baskets
- 2010–2011: Giants Düsseldorf
- 2011–2012: Lappeenrannan NMKY

Coaching
- 2012–2016: Kent State (assistant)
- 2016–2017: Toledo (assistant)
- 2017–2019: Michigan (assistant)
- 2019–2021: Maryland (assistant)
- 2021–2026: Marquette (assistant)
- 2026–present: Washington (assistant)

Career highlights
- As player: MAC Player of the Year (2006); First-team All-MAC (2006); As assistant coach: Big Ten regular season champion (2020); Big Ten tournament champion (2018)

DeAndre Lamount Haynes (born March 30, 1984) is an American college basketball coach, currently assistant coach for the Washington Huskies of the Big Ten Conference. He is a former basketball player and played college basketball for the Kent State Golden Flashes.

Haynes, a 6'2" point guard from Detroit, Michigan, came to Kent State from Southwestern High School in Detroit. Playing for the Golden Flashes from 2002 to 2006, Haynes scored 1,259 points and left as the school's all-time leader in assists (625) and steals (229). In his senior season of 2005–06, Haynes averaged 13 points per game and was named Mid-American Conference Player of the Year and an honorable mention All-American by the Associated Press. He led the Golden Flashes to regular-season and MAC championships that season.

After graduation, Haynes was not selected in the 2006 NBA draft. He instead signed in Belgium and played for the next six seasons in Belgium, Hungary, Germany and Finland.

Haynes retired from basketball in 2012 and became an assistant coach at Kent State under head coach Rob Senderoff. Following the 2015–16 season, he moved to a similar role at fellow MAC program Toledo. After joining the Illinois State Redbirds staff for a few months, he was hired by Michigan to serve as an assistant coach in August 2017.
