= 2017–18 Iowa Hawkeyes men's basketball team =

American college basketball season

2017–18 Iowa Hawkeyes men's basketball
- Conference: Big Ten Conference
- Record: 14–19 (4–14 Big Ten)
- Head coach: Fran McCaffery (8th season)
- Assistant coaches: Sherman Dillard; Andrew Francis; Kirk Speraw
- Home arena: Carver–Hawkeye Arena (Capacity: 15,400)

2017–18 Big Ten Conference men's basketball standings
	Conf.				Overall
Team	W		L	PCT	W		L	PCT
No. 5 Michigan State	16	–	2	.889	30	–	5	.857
No. 11 Purdue	15	–	3	.833	30	–	7	.811
No. 17 Ohio State	15	–	3	.833	25	–	9	.735
No. 7 Michigan †	13	–	5	.722	33	–	8	.805
Nebraska	13	–	5	.722	22	–	11	.667
Penn State	9	–	9	.500	26	–	13	.667
Indiana	9	–	9	.500	16	–	15	.516
Maryland	8	–	10	.444	19	–	13	.594
Wisconsin	7	–	11	.389	15	–	18	.455
Northwestern	6	–	12	.333	15	–	17	.469
Minnesota	4	–	14	.222	15	–	17	.469
Illinois	4	–	14	.222	14	–	18	.438
Iowa	4	–	14	.222	14	–	19	.424
Rutgers	3	–	15	.167	15	–	19	.441
† 2018 Big Ten tournament winner Rankings from AP poll

The 2017–18 Iowa Hawkeyes men's basketball team represented the University of Iowa in the 2017–18 NCAA Division I men's basketball season. The team was led by eighth-year head coach Fran McCaffery and played their home games at Carver–Hawkeye Arena as members of the Big Ten Conference. They finished the season 14–19, 4–14 in Big Ten play to finish in a three-way tie for 11th place. As the No. 12 seed in the Big Ten tournament, they defeated Illinois before losing to Michigan in the second round.

== Previous season ==
The Hawkeyes finished the 2016–17 season with a record of 19–15, 10–8 in Big Ten play to finish in a four-way tie for fifth place. In the Big Ten tournament, as the 7th seed, Iowa was upset by 10th-seeded Indiana in the second round. Iowa was one of the First Four teams out of the NCAA tournament, which earned the team a No. 1 seed in the National Invitation Tournament. They defeated South Dakota in the first round before losing to eventual NIT champions TCU in overtime in the second round.

== Offseason ==
=== Departures ===
Name	Number	Pos.	Height	Weight	Year	Hometown	Reason for departure
Peter Jok	14	G	6'6"	205	Senior	West Des Moines, IA	Graduated
Dale Jones	23	F	6'7"	227	Senior	Waterloo, IA	Graduated transferred to North Dakota
Christian Williams	11	G	6'5"	200	Junior	Decatur, IL	Transferred to Indiana State

=== 2017 recruiting class ===
College recruiting information
Name	Hometown	School	Height	Weight	Commit date
Connor McCaffery; SG	Iowa City, IA	West High School	6 ft 5 in (1.96 m)	190 lb (86 kg)	Aug 30, 2014
Connor McCaffery; SG	Recruit ratings: Scout: Rivals: 247Sports: ESPN:				
Luka Garza; C	Washington, D.C.	Maret School	6 ft 11 in (2.11 m)	230 lb (100 kg)	Sep 10, 2016
Luka Garza; C	Recruit ratings: Scout: Rivals: 247Sports: ESPN:				
Jack Nunge; PF	Newburgh, IN	Castle High School	6 ft 9 in (2.06 m)	185 lb (84 kg)	Sep 11, 2016
Jack Nunge; PF	Recruit ratings: Scout: Rivals: 247Sports: ESPN:				
Overall recruit ranking:
Note: In many cases, Scout, Rivals, 247Sports, On3, and ESPN may conflict in their listings of height and weight.; In these cases, the average was taken. ESPN grades are on a 100-point scale.; Sources: "ESPN- Iowa Hawkeyes Men's Basketball Recruiting". ESPN.; "2017 Team Ranking". Rivals.

=== 2018 Recruiting class ===
College recruiting information (2018)
Name	Hometown	School	Height	Weight	Commit date
Joe Wieskamp; SG	Muscatine, IA	Muscatine High School	6 ft 5 in (1.96 m)	195 lb (88 kg)	Jun 9, 2015
Joe Wieskamp; SG	Recruit ratings: Scout: Rivals: 247Sports: ESPN:				
CJ Fredrick; SG	Cincinnati, OH	Covington Catholic High School	6 ft 4 in (1.93 m)	165 lb (75 kg)	Aug 5, 2017
CJ Fredrick; SG	Recruit ratings: Scout: Rivals: 247Sports: ESPN:				
Overall recruit ranking:
Note: In many cases, Scout, Rivals, 247Sports, On3, and ESPN may conflict in their listings of height and weight.; In these cases, the average was taken. ESPN grades are on a 100-point scale.; Sources: "ESPN- Iowa Hawkeyes Men's Basketball Recruiting". ESPN.; "2018 Team Ranking". Rivals.

== Roster ==
2017–18 Iowa Hawkeyes men's basketball team
Players
Coaches

Pos.	#	Name	Height	Weight	Year	Previous school	Hometown
F	0	Ahmad Wagner	6 ft 7 in (2.01 m)	235 lb (107 kg)	Jr	Wayne High School	Yellow Springs, Ohio
G	1	Maishe Dailey	6 ft 6 in (1.98 m)	183 lb (83 kg)	So	Beachwood High School	Beachwood, Ohio
F	2	Jack Nunge	6 ft 11 in (2.11 m)	220 lb (100 kg)	Fr	Castle High School	Newburgh, Indiana
G	3	Jordan Bohannon	6 ft 0 in (1.83 m)	182 lb (83 kg)	So	Linn-Mar High School	Marion, Iowa
G	4	Isaiah Moss	6 ft 5 in (1.96 m)	205 lb (93 kg)	RS So	Simeon Academy	Chicago, Illinois
F	5	Tyler Cook	6 ft 9 in (2.06 m)	253 lb (115 kg)	So	Chaminade Prep	St. Louis, Missouri
F	11	Charlie Rose (W)	6 ft 4 in (1.93 m)	185 lb (84 kg)	Sr	York Community High School	Elmhurst, Illinois
G	13	Austin Ash (W)	6 ft 2 in (1.88 m)	155 lb (70 kg)	Fr	Mount Vernon High School	Cedar Rapids, Iowa
F	15	Ryan Kriener	6 ft 9 in (2.06 m)	247 lb (112 kg)	So	Spirit Lake High School	Spirit Lake, Iowa
F	20	Riley Till (W)	6 ft 6 in (1.98 m)	192 lb (87 kg)	RS Fr	Wahlert Catholic High School	Dubuque, Iowa
G	24	Brady Ellingson	6 ft 4 in (1.93 m)	193 lb (88 kg)	RS Jr	Sussex Hamilton High School	Menomonee Falls, Wisconsin
F	25	Dom Uhl	6 ft 9 in (2.06 m)	217 lb (98 kg)	Sr	Point Pleasant Beach High School	Frankfurt, Germany
G	30	Conner McCaffery	6 ft 5 in (1.96 m)	190 lb (86 kg)	Fr	Iowa City West High School	Iowa City, Iowa
F	35	Cordell Pemsl	6 ft 8 in (2.03 m)	249 lb (113 kg)	So	Wahlert Catholic High School	Dubuque, Iowa
F	51	Nicholas Baer	6 ft 7 in (2.01 m)	205 lb (93 kg)	RS Jr	Bettendorf High School	Bettendorf, Iowa
F	55	Luka Garza	6 ft 11 in (2.11 m)	237 lb (108 kg)	Fr	Maret High School	Washington, D.C.

Head coach

- Fran McCaffery (Penn)

Assistant coach(es)

- Sherman Dillard (James Madison)
- Andrew Francis (Southampton)
- Kirk Speraw (Iowa)

Legend

- (C) Team captain
- (S) Suspended
- (I) Ineligible
- (W) Walk-on
- Injured
- Current redshirt

Roster
Last update: 8/4/2017

== Schedule and results ==
The 2018 Big Ten tournament will be held at Madison Square Garden in New York City. Due to the Big East's use of that venue for their conference tournament, the Big Ten tournament will take place one week earlier than usual, ending the week before Selection Sunday. This could result in teams having nearly two weeks off before the NCAA tournament. As a result, it is anticipated that the Big Ten regular season will begin in mid-December. Coaches have requested that no Big Ten game be scheduled between Christmas and New Year's Day, accordingly each team will play two conference games in early December before finishing non-conference play.

Date time, TV	Rank^{#}	Opponent^{#}	Result	Record	High points	High rebounds	High assists	Site (attendance) city, state
European Tour
Aug 8, 2017*; 1:00 pm		vs. German All-Stars	W 99–65		17 – Garza	10 – Garza	5 – McCaffery	Heidelberg, Germany
Aug 10, 2017*; 1:00 pm		vs. Swiss All-Stars	W 125–56		24 – Garza	8 – Tied	5 – Tied	Baden, Switzerland
Aug 12, 2017*; 1:00 pm		vs. Milan All-Stars	W 106–64		25 – Garza	11 – Garza	7 – Williams	Milan, Italy
Aug 14, 2017*; 12:30 pm		vs. Vicenza All-Stars	W 88–49		24 – Garza	14 – Garza	4 – Tied	Vicenza, Italy
Exhibition
Oct 27, 2017*; 7:00 pm, BTN+		William Jewell	W 105–81		19 – Bohannon	9 – Tied	4 – Bohannon	Carver–Hawkeye Arena (11,539); Iowa City, IA
Nov 2, 2017*; 7:00 pm, BTN+		Belmont Abbey	W 96–64		24 – Cook	12 – Garza	5 – Bohannon	Carver–Hawkeye Arena (10,293); Iowa City, IA
Regular season
Nov 10, 2017*; 8:00 pm, BTN+		Chicago State	W 95–62	1–0	16 – Garza	6 – Tied	6 – Bohannon	Carver–Hawkeye Arena (12,100); Iowa City, IA
Nov 12, 2017*; 3:00 pm, BTN+		Alabama State; Cayman Islands Classic campus game	W 92–58	2–0	15 – Pemsl	13 – Garza	6 – Bohannon	Carver–Hawkeye Arena (11,637); Iowa City, IA
Nov 16, 2017*; 7:00 pm, BTN+		Grambling State	W 85–74	3–0	17 – Nunge	9 – Garza	7 – Bohannon	Carver–Hawkeye Arena (10,540); Iowa City, IA
Nov 20, 2017*; 11:00 am		vs. Louisiana; Cayman Islands Classic quarterfinals	L 71–80	3–1	24 – Moss	8 – Pemsl	2 – 3 tied	John Gray High School (1,200); George Town, Cayman Islands
Nov 21, 2017*; 11:00 am		vs. South Dakota State; Cayman Islands Classic consolation 2nd round	L 72–80	3–2	18 – Moss	10 – Garza	7 – Bohannon	John Gray High School (1,275); George Town, Cayman Islands
Nov 22, 2017*; 11:00 am		vs. UAB; Cayman Islands Classic 7th place game	W 95–85	4–2	30 – Bohannon	7 – Garza	4 – 3 tied	John Gray High School (1,020); George Town, Cayman Islands
Nov 28, 2017*; 8:15 pm, ESPN2		at Virginia Tech; ACC–Big Ten Challenge	L 55–79	4–3	16 – Cook	9 – Cook	6 – Pemsl	Cassell Coliseum (7,101); Blacksburg, VA
Dec 2, 2017; 4:00 pm, BTN		Penn State	L 73–77	4–4 (0–1)	23 – Cook	12 – Cook	4 – Tied	Carver–Hawkeye Arena (12,805); Iowa City, IA
Dec 4, 2017; 7:00 pm, BTN		at Indiana	L 64–77	4–5 (0–2)	16 – Ellingson	6 – Nunge	4 – 3 tied	Simon Skjodt Assembly Hall (17,222); Bloomington, IN
Dec 7, 2017*; 7:00 pm, ESPN2		at Iowa State; Iowa Corn Cy-Hawk Series	L 78–84	4–6	19 – Bohannon	8 – Tied	5 – Tied	Hilton Coliseum (14,384); Ames, IA
Dec 10, 2017*; 4:00 pm, BTN		Southern	W 91–60	5–6	23 – Garza	13 – Garza	5 – Bohannon	Carver–Hawkeye Arena (11,397); Iowa City, IA
Dec 16, 2017*; 1:00 pm, BTN		vs. Drake; Big Four Classic	W 90–64	6–6	23 – Cook	14 – Baer	7 – Bohannon	Wells Fargo Arena (13,828); Des Moines, IA
Dec 19, 2017*; 8:00 pm, BTN		Southern Utah	W 92–64	7–6	17 – Garza	10 – Baer	7 – Bohannon	Carver–Hawkeye Arena (10,220); Iowa City, IA
Dec 22, 2017*; 8:00 pm, BTN		vs. Colorado; Sanford Pentagon Showcase	W 80–73	8–6	16 – Tied	8 – Pemsl	2 – 4 tied	Sanford Pentagon (3,250); Sioux Falls, SD
Dec 29, 2017*; 7:00 pm, BTN+		Northern Illinois	W 98–75	9–6	25 – Garza	7 – Garza	7 – Bohannon	Carver–Hawkeye Arena (14,665); Iowa City, IA
Jan 2, 2018; 6:00 pm, ESPN2		Michigan	L 68–75	9–7 (0–3)	28 – Cook	8 – Cook	3 – Bohannon	Carver–Hawkeye Arena (11,363); Iowa City, IA
Jan 4, 2018; 6:00 pm, ESPNU		Ohio State	L 81–92	9–8 (0–4)	21 – Cook	9 – Cook	10 – Bohannon	Carver–Hawkeye Arena (10,933); Iowa City, IA
Jan 7, 2018; 7:00 pm, FS1		at Maryland	L 73–91	9–9 (0–5)	25 – Moss	11 – Baer	5 – Bohannon	Xfinity Center (13,352); College Park, MD
Jan 11, 2018; 7:00 pm, FS1		at Illinois	W 104–97 ^{OT}	10–9 (1–5)	29 – Bohannon	13 – Cook	5 – Bohannon	State Farm Center (11,326); Champaign, IL
Jan 17, 2018; 6:00 pm, BTN		at Rutgers	L 64–80	10–10 (1–6)	23 – Bohannon	10 – Cook	3 – Tied	Louis Brown Athletic Center (4,002); Piscataway, NJ
Jan 20, 2018; 11:00 am, ESPN		No. 3 Purdue	L 64–87	10–11 (1–7)	19 – Garza	7 – Baer	5 – Moss	Carver–Hawkeye Arena (14,822); Iowa City, IA
Jan 23, 2018; 6:00 pm, ESPN2		Wisconsin	W 85–67	11–11 (2–7)	17 – Tied	16 – Garza	11 – Bohannon	Carver–Hawkeye Arena (11,563); Iowa City, IA
Jan 27, 2018; 7:00 pm, BTN		at Nebraska	L 84–98	11–12 (2–8)	24 – Tied	10 – Cook	7 – Bohannon	Pinnacle Bank Arena (15,952); Lincoln, NE
Jan 30, 2018; 8:00 pm, BTN		Minnesota	W 94–80	12–12 (3–8)	20 – Bohannon	10 – Cook	10 – Bohannon	Carver–Hawkeye Arena (10,371); Iowa City, IA
Feb 3, 2018; 5:00 pm, BTN		at Penn State	L 58–82	12–13 (3–9)	19 – Cook	6 – 3 tied	3 – Bohannon	Bryce Jordan Center (10,394); University Park, PA
Feb 6, 2018; 8:00 pm, ESPN		No. 4 Michigan State	L 93–96	12–14 (3–10)	26 – Cook	7 – Pemsi	6 – Bohannon	Carver–Hawkeye Arena (11,350); Iowa City, IA
Feb 10, 2018; 5:00 pm, BTN		at No. 14 Ohio State	L 64–82	12–15 (3–11)	18 – Nunge	5 – Nunge	5 – Bohannon	Value City Arena (18,809); Columbus, OH
Feb 14, 2018; 5:30 pm, BTN		at No. 22 Michigan	L 59–74	12–16 (3–12)	22 – Garza	8 – Cook	4 – Garza	Crisler Center (10,173); Ann Arbor, MI
Feb 17, 2018; 1:00 pm, ESPN		Indiana	L 82–84	12–17 (3–13)	28 – Cook	10 – Cook	7 – Bohannon	Carver–Hawkeye Arena (15,229); Iowa City, IA
Feb 21, 2018; 8:00 pm, BTN		at Minnesota	L 82–86	12–18 (3–14)	32 – Moss	9 – Garza	6 – Tied	Williams Arena (11,732); Minneapolis, MN
Feb 25, 2018; 6:30 pm, BTN		Northwestern	W 77–70	13–18 (4–14)	25 – Bohannon	11 – Cook	6 – Cook	Carver–Hawkeye Arena (11,396); Iowa City, IA
Big Ten tournament
Feb 28, 2018; 5:30 pm, BTN	(12)	vs. (13) Illinois; First round	W 96–87	14–18	25 – Bohannon	8 – Garza	6 – Bohannon	Madison Square Garden (11,396); New York City, NY
Feb 28, 2018; 1:30 pm, BTN	(12)	vs. (5) No. 15 Michigan; Second round	L 71–79 ^{OT}	14–19	14 – Kriener	8 – Garza	5 – Bohannon	Madison Square Garden (13,815); New York City, NY
*Non-conference game. ^{#}Rankings from AP Poll. (#) Tournament seedings in parentheses. All times are in Central Time.

- Source: Schedule

== See also ==
2017–18 Iowa Hawkeyes women's basketball team
