= 2018 Big Ten men's basketball tournament =

- Classification: Division I
- Season: 2017–18
- Teams: 14
- Site: Madison Square Garden; New York, NY
- Champions: Michigan (3rd* title)
- Winning coach: John Beilein (2nd title)
- MVP: Moritz Wagner (Michigan)
- Attendance: 106,157
- Television: BTN, CBS

2017–18 Big Ten Conference men's basketball standings
	Conf.				Overall
Team	W		L	PCT	W		L	PCT
No. 5 Michigan State	16	–	2	.889	30	–	5	.857
No. 11 Purdue	15	–	3	.833	30	–	7	.811
No. 17 Ohio State	15	–	3	.833	25	–	9	.735
No. 7 Michigan †	13	–	5	.722	33	–	8	.805
Nebraska	13	–	5	.722	22	–	11	.667
Penn State	9	–	9	.500	26	–	13	.667
Indiana	9	–	9	.500	16	–	15	.516
Maryland	8	–	10	.444	19	–	13	.594
Wisconsin	7	–	11	.389	15	–	18	.455
Northwestern	6	–	12	.333	15	–	17	.469
Minnesota	4	–	14	.222	15	–	17	.469
Illinois	4	–	14	.222	14	–	18	.438
Iowa	4	–	14	.222	14	–	19	.424
Rutgers	3	–	15	.167	15	–	19	.441
† 2018 Big Ten tournament winner Rankings from AP poll

The 2018 Big Ten men's basketball tournament was the postseason men's basketball tournament for the Big Ten Conference of the 2017–18 NCAA Division I men's basketball season. It was held from February 28 through March 4, 2018 at Madison Square Garden in New York City. Due to the Big East's use of that venue for their conference tournament, the Big Ten tournament took place one week earlier than usual, ending the week before Selection Sunday.

Michigan defeated Purdue in the championship game to win their second consecutive tournament and third overall (their first championship in 1998 was later vacated). As a result, they received the conference's automatic bid to the NCAA tournament.

The tournament was the second Big Ten Conference tournament held outside the conference's traditional heartland in the Midwest following the 2017 tournament held at the Verizon Center in Washington, D.C.

== Seeds ==
All 14 Big Ten schools participated in the tournament. Teams were seeded by conference record, with a tiebreaker system used to seed teams with identical conference records. The top 10 teams received a first round bye and the top four teams received a double bye. Tiebreaking procedures remained unchanged from the 2017 Tournament.

Seed	School	Conf.	Tiebreaker 1	Tiebreaker 2	Tiebreaker 3	Tiebreaker 4	Tiebreaker 5
1	Michigan State	16–2					
2	Ohio State	15–3	1–0 vs Pur				
3	Purdue	15–3	0–1 vs OSU				
4	Nebraska	13–5	1–0 vs Mich				
5	Michigan	13–5	0–1 vs Neb				
6	Indiana	9–9	1–0 vs PSU				
7	Penn State	9–9	0–1 vs Ind				
8	Maryland	8–10					
9	Wisconsin	7–11					
10	Northwestern	6–12					
11	Minnesota	4–14	2–1 vs Iowa/Ill	0–1 vs MSU	0–3 vs OSU/Pur	0–4 vs Neb/Mich	1–2 vs Ind/PSU
12	Iowa	4–14	2–1 vs Minn/Ill	0–1 vs MSU	0–3 vs OSU/Pur	0–3 vs Neb/Mich	0–4 vs Ind/PSU
13	Illinois	4–14	0–2 vs Minn/Iowa				
14	Rutgers	3–15					

== Schedule ==
Session	Game	Time*	Matchup	Score	Television	Attendance
First round – Wednesday, February 28
1	1	5:30 pm	No. 13 Illinois vs No. 12 Iowa	87–96	BTN	14,681
1	2	8:00 pm	No. 14 Rutgers vs No. 11 Minnesota	65–54	BTN	14,681
Second round – Thursday, March 1
2	3	12:00 pm	No. 9 Wisconsin vs No. 8 Maryland	59–54	BTN	13,815
2	4	2:30 pm	No. 12 Iowa vs No. 5 Michigan	71–77^{OT}	BTN	13,815
3	5	6:30 pm	No. 10 Northwestern vs No. 7 Penn State	57–65	BTN	13,996
3	6	9:00 pm	No. 14 Rutgers vs No. 6 Indiana	76–69	BTN	13,996
Quarterfinals – Friday, March 2
4	7	12:00 pm	No. 9 Wisconsin vs No. 1 Michigan State	60–63	BTN	14,260
4	8	2:30 pm	No. 5 Michigan vs No. 4 Nebraska	77–58	BTN	14,260
5	9	6:30 pm	No. 7 Penn State vs No. 2 Ohio St.	69–68	BTN	14,530
5	10	9:00 pm	No. 14 Rutgers vs No. 3 Purdue	75–82	BTN	14,530
Semifinals – Saturday, March 3
6	11	2:00 pm	No. 5 Michigan vs No. 1 Michigan State	75–64	CBS	19,812
6	12	4:30 pm	No. 7 Penn St. vs No. 3 Purdue	70–78	CBS	19,812
Championship – Sunday, March 4
7	13	4:30 pm	No. 5 Michigan vs No. 3 Purdue	75–66	CBS	15,063
*Game times in Eastern Time. Rankings denote tournament seed

== Bracket ==
First round Wednesday, February 28; BTN
12	Iowa	96
13	Illinois	87
11	Minnesota	54
14	Rutgers	65

Second round Thursday, March 1 BTN
8	Maryland	54
9	Wisconsin	59
5	Michigan	77*
12	Iowa	71
7	Penn State	65
10	Northwestern	57
6	Indiana	69
14	Rutgers	76

Quarterfinals; Friday, March 2 BTN
1	Michigan State	63
9	Wisconsin	60
4	Nebraska	58
5	Michigan	77
2	Ohio State	68
7	Penn State	69
3	Purdue	82
14	Rutgers	75

Semifinals; Saturday, March 3 CBS
1	Michigan State	64
5	Michigan	75
7	Penn State	70
3	Purdue	78

Championship; Sunday, March 4 CBS
5	Michigan	75
3	Purdue	66

* denotes overtime period

== Game summaries ==
=== First round ===
BTN

Feb 28
5:30 pm

Recap

No. 13 Illinois 87, No. 12 Iowa 96
Scoring by half: 31–35, 56–61
Pts: K. Nichols 31; Rebs: M. Finke 4 Asts: T. Lucas 8	Pts: J. Bohannon 25; Rebs: L. Garza 8 Asts: J. Bohannon 6

Madison Square Garden
New York City, NY
Attendance: 14,681
Referees: Terry Wymer, Bo Boroski, Lewis Garrison

BTN

Feb 28
8:00 pm

Recap

No. 14 Rutgers 65, No. 11 Minnesota 54
Scoring by half: 34–27, 31–27
Pts: C. Sanders 23; Rebs: D. Freeman 11; Asts: C. Sanders 2	Pts: I. Washington 18; Rebs: J. Murphy 9 Asts: D. McBrayer 3

Madison Square Garden
New York City, NY
Attendance: 14,681
Referees: Gene Steratore, Paul Szelc, Courtney Green

=== Second round ===
BTN

Mar 1
12:00 pm

Recap

No. 9 Wisconsin 59, No. 8 Maryland 54
Scoring by half: 28–26, 31–28
Pts: E. Happ 14; Rebs: E. Happ 7 Asts: B. Davison 2	Pts: K. Huerter 20; Rebs: B. Fernando 9 Asts: A. Cowan Jr. 4

Madison Square Garden
New York City, NY
Attendance: 13,815
Referees: Terry Wymer, Lamont Simpson, Kelly Pfeifer

BTN

Mar 1
2:30 pm

Recap

No. 12 Iowa 71, No. 5 Michigan 77 (OT)
Scoring by half: 40–35, 27–32 Overtime: 4–10
Pts: R. Kriener 14; Rebs: L. Garza 8 Asts: J. Bohannon 5	Pts: C. Matthews 16; Rebs: J. Teske 9 Asts: M. Abdur-Rahkman/Z. Simpson 3

Madison Square Garden
New York City, NY
Attendance: 13,815
Referees: D.J. Carstensen, Courtney Green, Larry Scirotto

BTN

Mar 1
6:30 pm

Recap

No. 10 Northwestern 57, No. 7 Penn State 65
Scoring by half: 30–30, 27–35
Pts: D. Pardon 14; Rebs: B. Benson 9 Asts: B. McIntosh 5	Pts: T. Carr 25; Rebs: J. Reaves 8 Asts: T. Carr 4

Madison Square Garden
New York City, NY
Attendance: 13,996

BTN

Mar 1
9:00 pm

Recap

No. 14 Rutgers 76, No. 6 Indiana 69
Scoring by half: 29–28, 47–41
Pts: C. Sanders 28; Rebs: D. Freeman 8 Asts: C. Sanders 3	Pts: J. Morgan 15; Rebs: J. Morgan 9 Asts: R. Johnson/J. Morgan 4

Madison Square Garden
New York City, NY
Attendance: 13,996

=== Quarterfinals ===
BTN

Mar 2
12:00 pm

Recap

No. 9 Wisconsin 60, No. 1 Michigan State 63
Scoring by half: 28-32, 32-31
Pts: E. Happ 22; Rebs: K. Iverson 5 Asts: B. Davison 5	Pts: M. Bridges 20; Rebs: M. Bridges 9 Asts: C. Winston 5

Madison Square Garden
New York City, NY
Attendance: 14,260

BTN

Mar 2
2:30 pm

Recap

No. 5 Michigan 77, No. 4 Nebraska 58
Scoring by half: 34–24, 43–34
Pts: M. Abdur-Rahkman 21; Rebs: M. Wagner 13; Asts: Z. Simpson 6	Pts: J. Palmer/I. Roby 16; Rebs: I. Roby 7 Asts: G. Watson/J. Palmer 2

Madison Square Garden
New York City, NY
Attendance: 10,292

BTN

Mar 2
6:30 pm

Recap

No. 7 Penn State 69, No. 2 Ohio State 68
Scoring by half: 33–32, 36–36
Pts: T. Carr 25; Rebs: J. Reaves/L. Stevens 7 Asts: T. Carr 5	Pts: K. Bates-Diop 25; Rebs: J. Tate 7 Asts: C. Jackson 6

Madison Square Garden
New York City, NY

BTN

Mar 2
9:00 pm

Recap

No. 14 Rutgers 75, No. 3 Purdue 82
Scoring by half: 38–35, 37–47
Pts: G. Baker 25; Rebs: M. Williams 8 Asts: C. Sanders 4	Pts: C. Edwards/V. Edwards 26; Rebs: I. Hass 10; Asts: D. Mathias 7

Madison Square Garden
New York City, NY
Attendance: 14,530

=== Semifinals ===
CBS

Mar 3
2:00 pm

Recap

No. 1 Michigan State 64, No. 5 Michigan 75
Scoring by half: 29–26, 35–49
Pts: M. Bridges 17; Rebs: 3 tied with 7 Asts: C. Winston 5	Pts: 3 tied with 15; Rebs: M. Wagner 8 Asts: M. Abdur-Rahkman/C. Matthews 3

Madison Square Garden
New York City, NY
Attendance: 19,812

CBS

Mar 3
4:30 pm

Recap

No. 7 Penn State 70, No. 3 Purdue 78
Scoring by half: 31–33, 39–45
Pts: S. Garner 33; Rebs: T. Carr 9 Asts: T. Carr 4	Pts: C. Edwards 27; Rebs: I. Hass 7 Asts: V. Edwards 5

Madison Square Garden
New York City, NY
Attendance: 19,812

=== Championship ===
CBS

Mar 4
4:30 pm

Recap

No. 5 Michigan 75, No. 3 Purdue 66
Scoring by half: 38–33, 37–33
Pts: M. Wagner 17; Rebs: Z. Simpson 5 Asts: Z. Simpson 5	Pts: I. Haas 23; Rebs: C. Edwards/I. Haas 8 Asts: C. Edwards/V. Edwards 2

Madison Square Garden
New York City, NY
Attendance: 15,063

== Sponsorship ==
Financial firm SoFi acquired presenting sponsorship of the tournament as part of a multi-year deal, including signage, presenting sponsorship of BTN telecasts of the tournament, and on-site marketing presences. The Tournament was branded as the 2018 Big Ten Conference men's basketball tournament presented by SoFi for sponsorship reasons.

== All-Tournament Team ==
- Moritz Wagner, Michigan – Big Ten tournament Most Outstanding Player
- Muhammad-Ali Abdur-Rahkman, Michigan
- Carsen Edwards, Purdue
- Tony Carr, Penn State
- Corey Sanders, Rutgers
