= Muhammad-Ali Abdur-Rahkman =

American basketball player (born 1994)

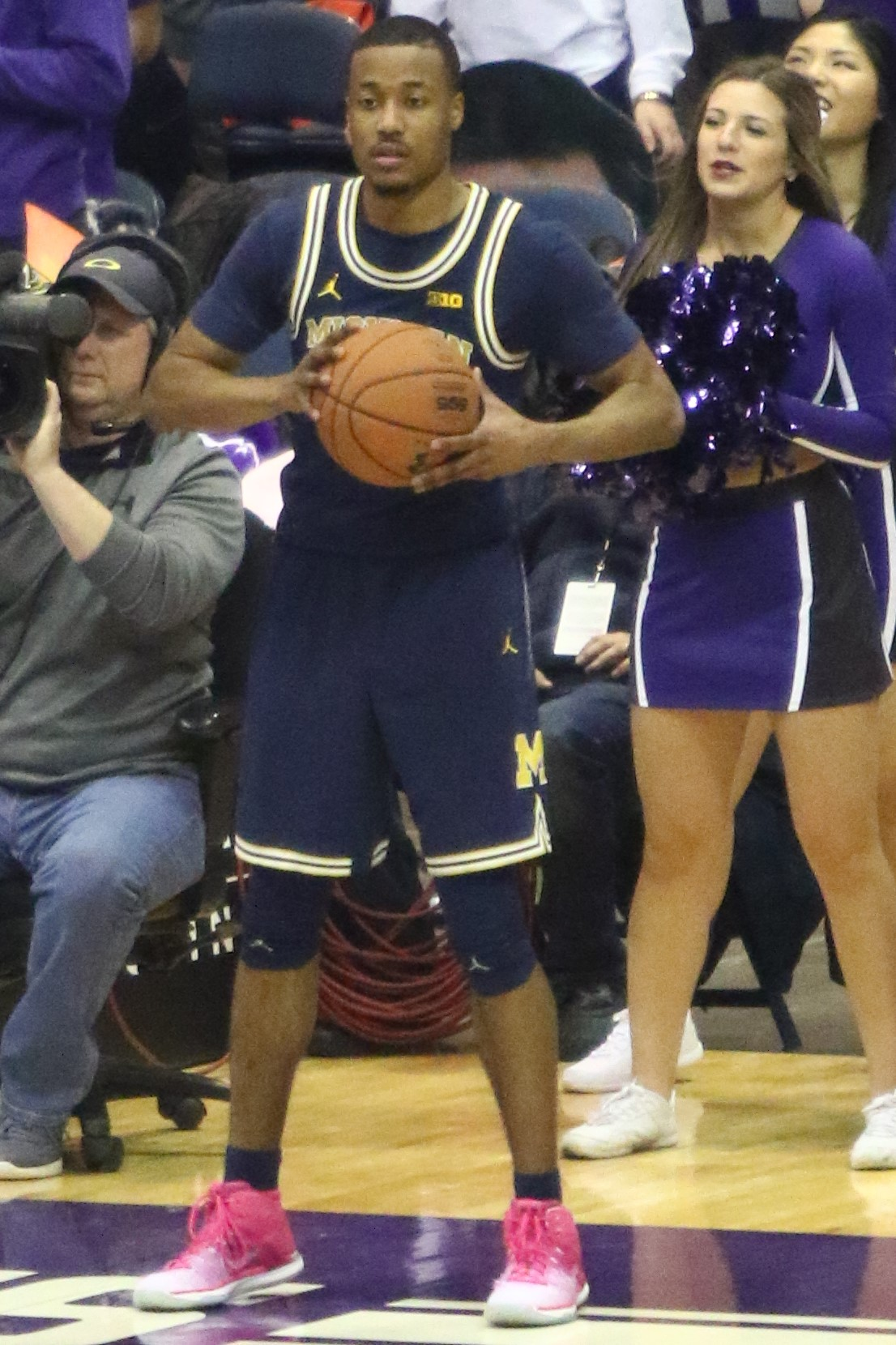
- Abdur-Rahkman with the 2017–18 Michigan Wolverines

Free Agent
- Position: Point guard / shooting guard

Personal information
- Born: September 1, 1994 (age 32) Allentown, Pennsylvania, U.S.
- Listed height: 6 ft 4 in (1.93 m)
- Listed weight: 190 lb (86 kg)

Career information
- High school: Allentown Central Catholic (Allentown, Pennsylvania)
- College: Michigan (2014–2018)
- NBA draft: 2018: undrafted
- Playing career: 2018–present

Career history
- 2018–2020: Canton Charge
- 2021–2022: Legia Warszawa
- 2022–2023: Victoria Libertas Pesaro
- 2023–2024: Darüşşafaka
- 2024–2025: Bilbao
- 2025–2026: Treviso Basket

Career highlights
- FIBA Europe Cup champion (2025)

Muhammad-Ali Abdur-Rahkman (born September 1, 1994) is an American-Saudi Arabian professional basketball player who last played for Treviso Basket of the Lega Basket Serie A (LBA). He played college basketball for the Michigan Wolverines. Abdur-Rahkman played high school basketball for Allentown Central Catholic High School in his hometown of Allentown, Pennsylvania, where he was a four-time Pennsylvania Interscholastic Athletic Association (PIAA) Class AAA All-State selection.

In college, he set the Michigan record for career games played (144). As a college senior, he was a 2018 All Big Ten honorable mention honoree by both the coaches and the media. He was part of the 2016–17 Wolverines team that reached the sweet sixteen round of the 2017 NCAA Division I men's basketball tournament and the 2017–18 team that reached the Championship Game of the 2018 NCAA Division I men's basketball tournament. He was a member of Big Ten Conference men's basketball tournament champions in 2017 and 2018.

== Early life and education ==
Abdur-Rahkman was born on September 1, 1994, in Allentown, Pennsylvania, to Dawud and Tammy Abdur-Rahkman. He has a sister, Nailah, and a brother, Shahad. Dawud was an assistant men's basketball coach at Muhlenberg College. Shahad played college basketball at East Stroudsburg University of Pennsylvania. Abdur-Rahkman is named after boxer Muhammad Ali; his father converted to Islam in 1980 after he met Ali two years earlier.

Abdur-Rahkman was a four-time PIAA Class AAA All-State selection—first team (2013, 2014), second team (2011, 2012)—for Allentown Central Catholic High School. Dawud became the head men's basketball coach at Lehigh Carbon Community College in 2017.

Abdur-Rahkman received over 30 scholarship offers, mostly from second tier programs. As a result, he waited until the late signing period of his senior season in hopes of getting the attention of a major program. Former college basketball coach Dave Rooney had been a friend of John Beilein when the two were both young coaches and recommended that Beilein consider Abdur-Rahkman. In addition to his scholarship offers, Abdur-Rahkman also had serious interest from Boston College, Pitt and Penn State and was expected to land at one of those schools had Michigan not made him an offer.

College recruiting
Name	Hometown	School	Height	Weight	Commit date
Muhammad-Ali Abdur-Rahkman; SG	Allentown, PA	Central Catholic (PA)	6 ft 4 in (1.93 m)	180 lb (82 kg)	Apr 19, 2014
Muhammad-Ali Abdur-Rahkman; SG	Recruit ratings: Scout: Rivals: 247Sports: ESPN: (64)				
Overall recruit ranking: ESPN: 102 (SG), 9 (PA)
Note: In many cases, Scout, Rivals, 247Sports, On3, and ESPN may conflict in their listings of height and weight.; In these cases, the average was taken. ESPN grades are on a 100-point scale.; Sources: "Michigan 2014 Basketball Commitments". Rivals.; "2014 Michigan Basketball Commits". Scout.; "ESPN Recruiting Nation Basketball". ESPN.; "Scout.com Team Recruiting Rankings". Scout.; "2014 Team Ranking". Rivals.

== College career ==
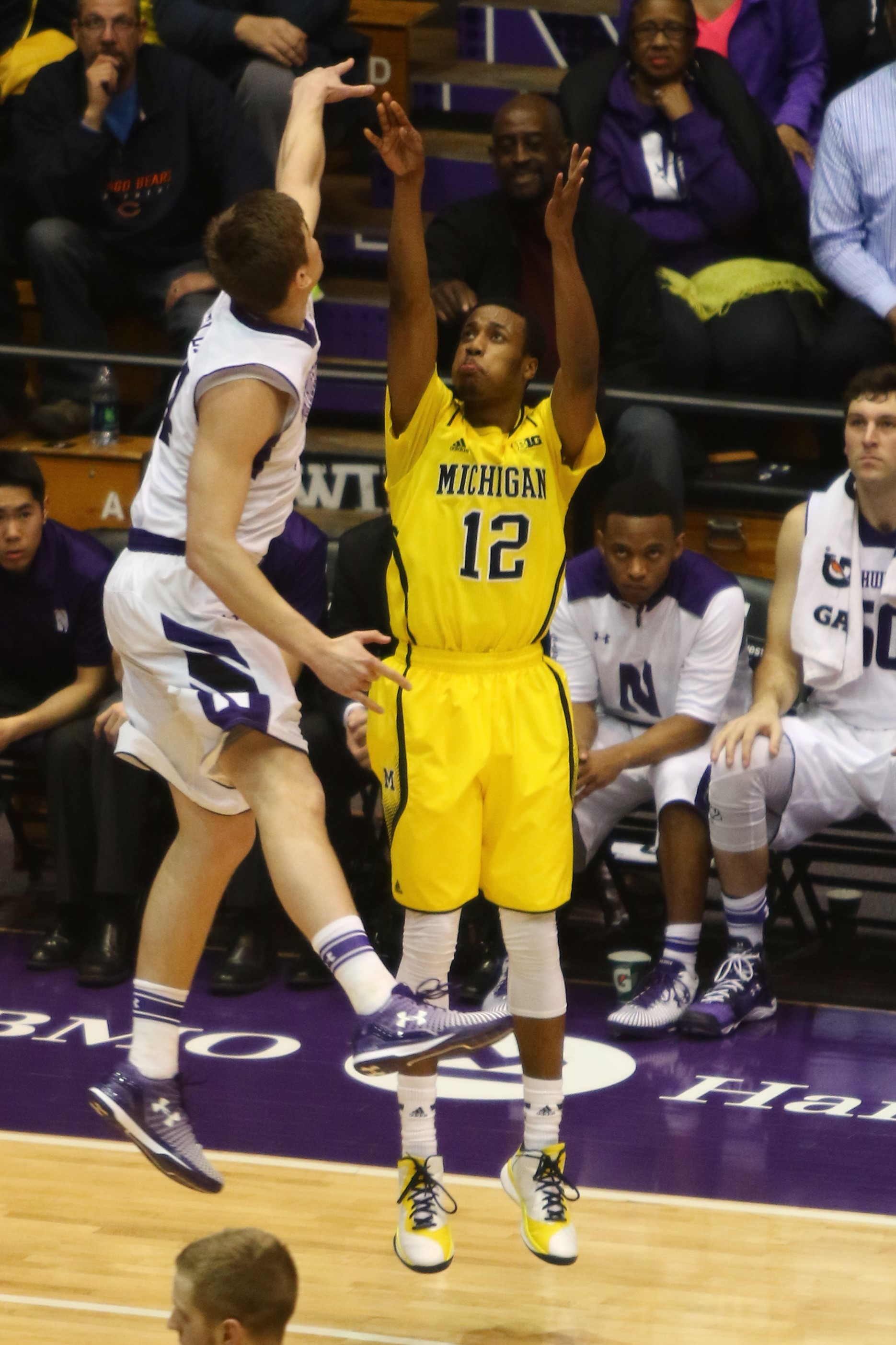
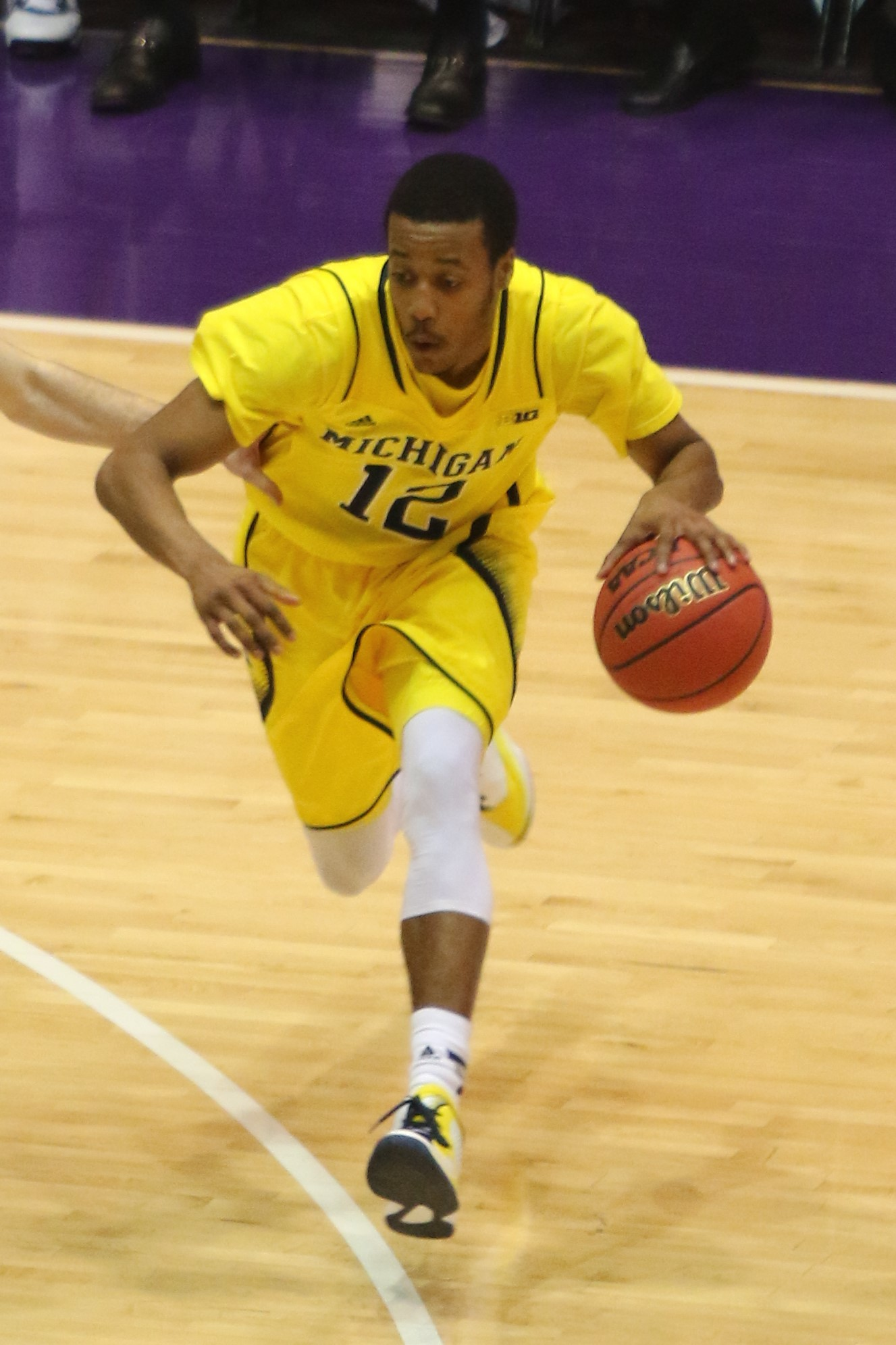
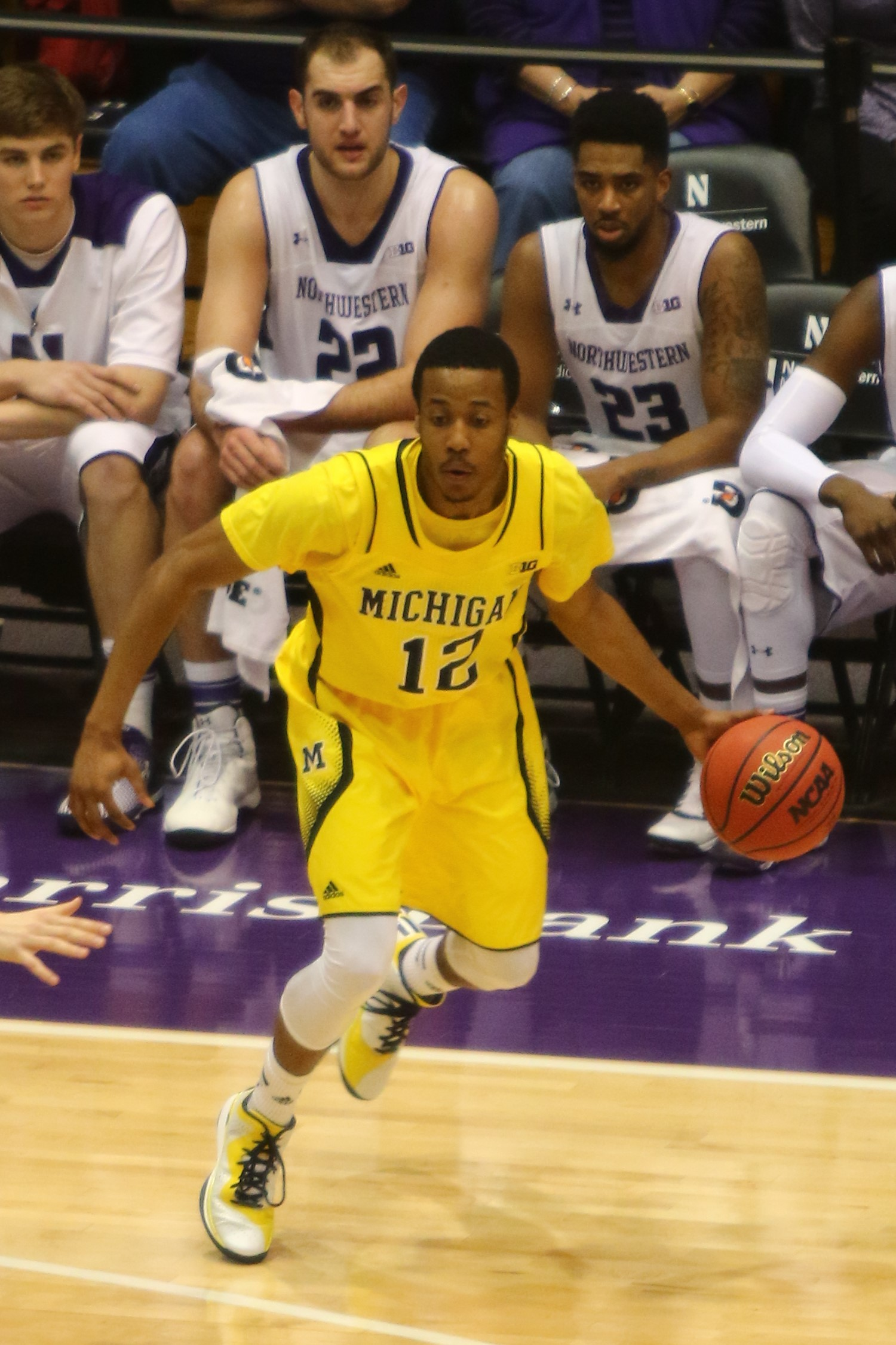
Abdur-Rahkman for the 2014–15 Wolverines

The 2013–14 Michigan Wolverines men's basketball team had been outright champions of 2013–14 Big Ten Conference and reached the elite eight round of the 2014 NCAA Division I men's basketball tournament, but lost three players to the 2014 NBA draft: Nik Stauskas, Mitch McGary and Glenn Robinson III.

=== Freshman season ===
Abdur-Rahkman matriculated to the University of Michigan where he became roommates with Aubrey Dawkins. He made his NCAA debut for Michigan against Hillsdale on November 15 along with 6 other true freshmen and a redshirt freshman, but was held scoreless. He scored his first points on December 9 in a loss to Eastern Michigan. On January 17, 2015, in his first career start (in place of Spike Albrecht), Abdur-Rahkman made the three point shot that provided the margin of victory against Northwestern. On January 27 against Nebraska, Abdur-Rahkman moved into the starting lineup when Derrick Walton went down with an injury. Walton remained sidelined for the rest of the season. On February 1, Abdur-Rahkman posted a career-high 18 points in the rivalry game against Michigan State, but Michigan lost in overtime. On March 12, Abdur-Rahkman tallied 15 points and a career-high eight rebounds against Illinois in the second round of the 2015 Big Ten Conference men's basketball tournament to help Michigan extend its streak of opening round wins in the tournament to nine.

=== Sophomore season ===
On January 7, 2016, Abdur-Rahkman scored a career-high 25 points against Purdue. On January 12 with leading scorer Caris LeVert sidelined, Abdur-Rahkman started as Michigan defeated #3 Maryland 70–67. Abdur-Rahkman posted a game-high four assists. On March 16 in the First Four rounds of the 2016 NCAA Division I men's basketball tournament, Michigan defeated Tulsa, 67–62, behind a team-high 16 points from Abdur-Rahkman, his fifth consecutive double digit performance. He started in 25 games and was one of four Wolverines to play in all 36 games for the 2015-16 Michigan Wolverines men's basketball team.

=== Junior season ===
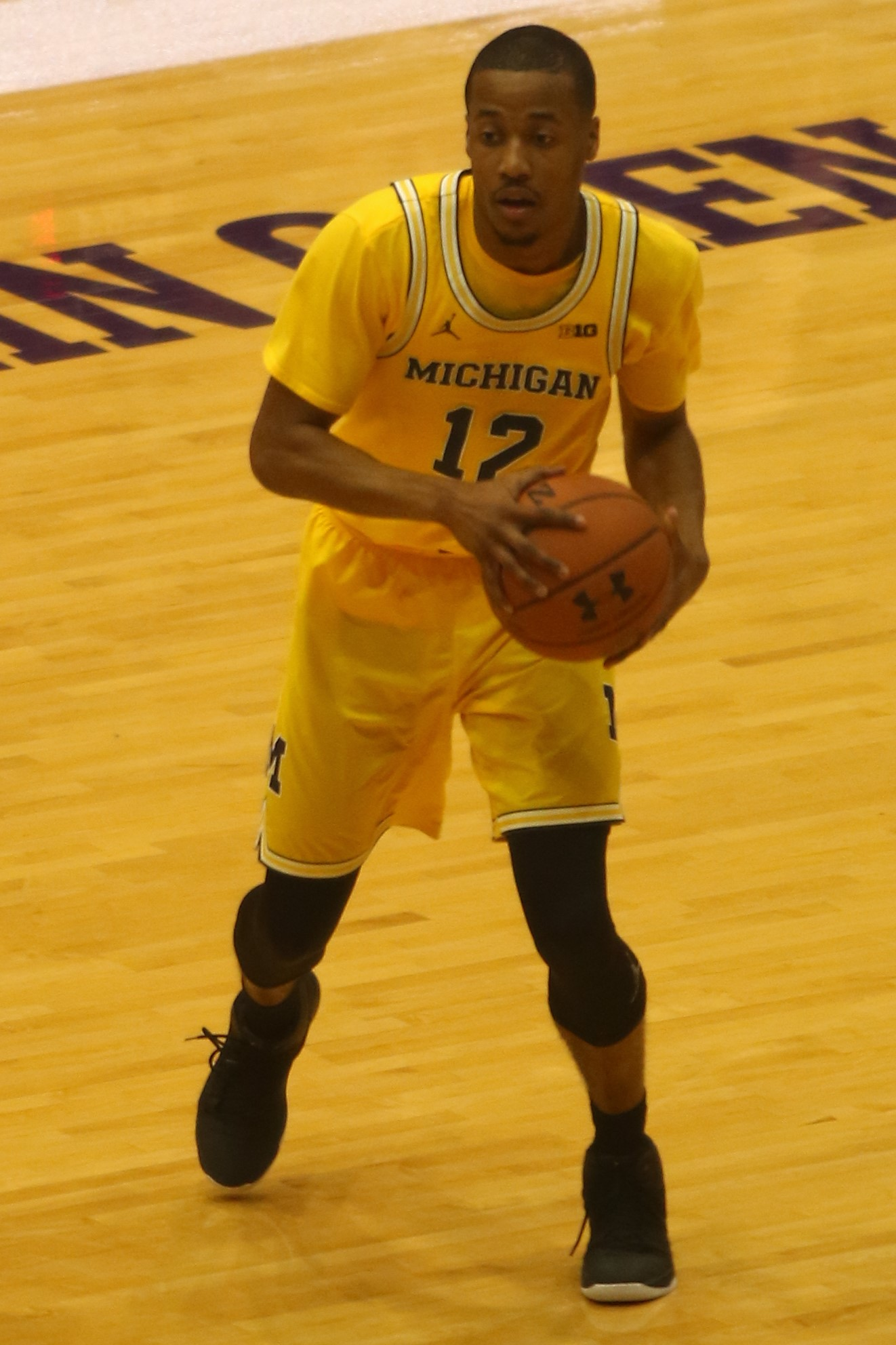
Abdur-Rahkman for the 2016–17 Wolverines

As a junior, he was a regular starter for the Wolverines, starting 37 of the 38 games he played. On December 17, Michigan defeated Maryland Eastern Shore 98–49 as Abdur-Rahkman recorded a career-high 10 assists. During the 2016–17 Big Ten Conference men's basketball season, Abdur Rahkman had a 53.4% field goal percentage, including 48.9% on three point field goals, which was second in the conference. The team won the 2017 Big Ten Conference men's basketball tournament and reached the sweet sixteen round of the 2017 NCAA Division I men's basketball tournament. Rahkman averaged 9.0 points, 3.8 rebounds and 1.5 steals in the Big Ten tournament, including 17 points in Michigan's opening game against Illinois on March 9.

=== Senior season ===
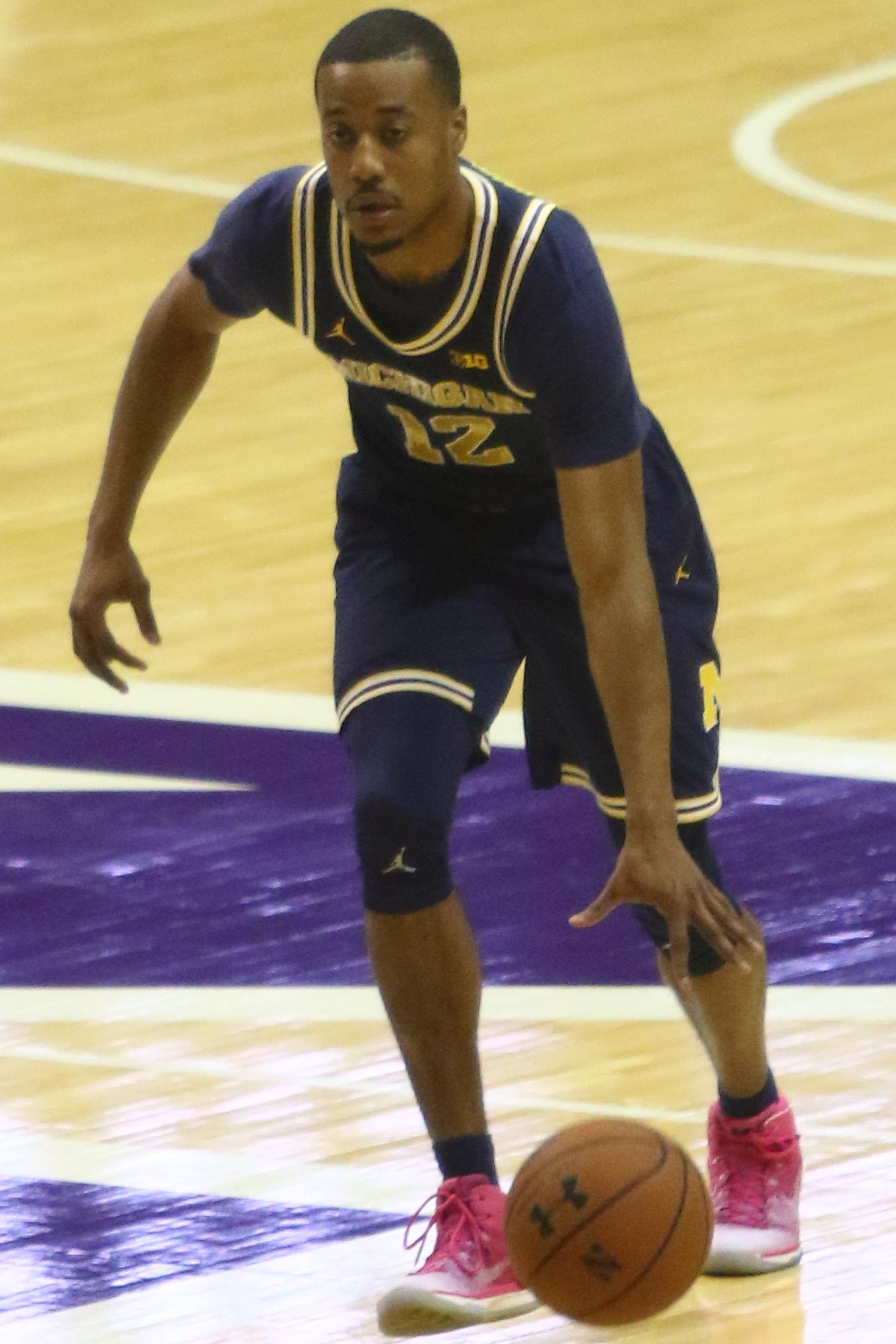
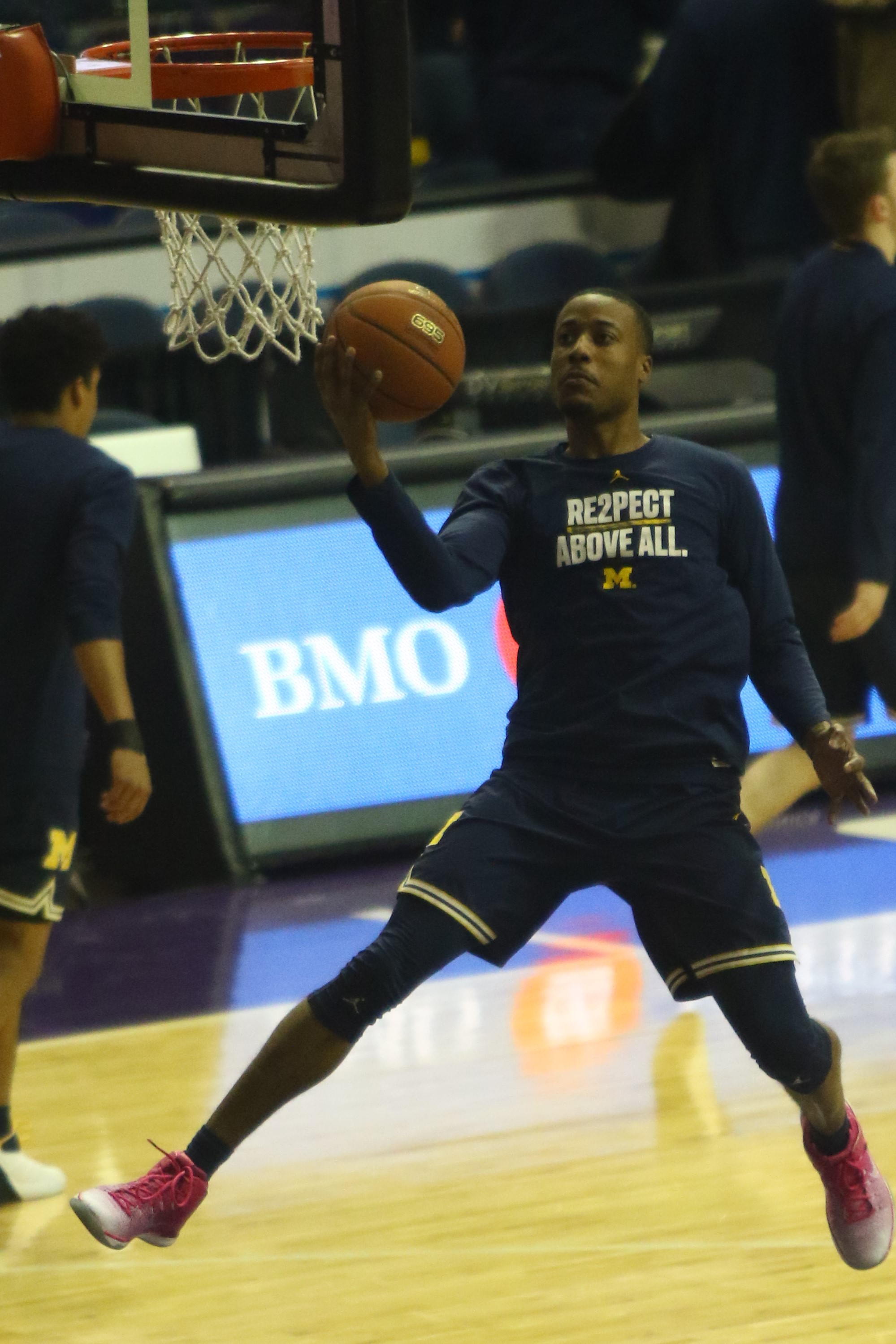
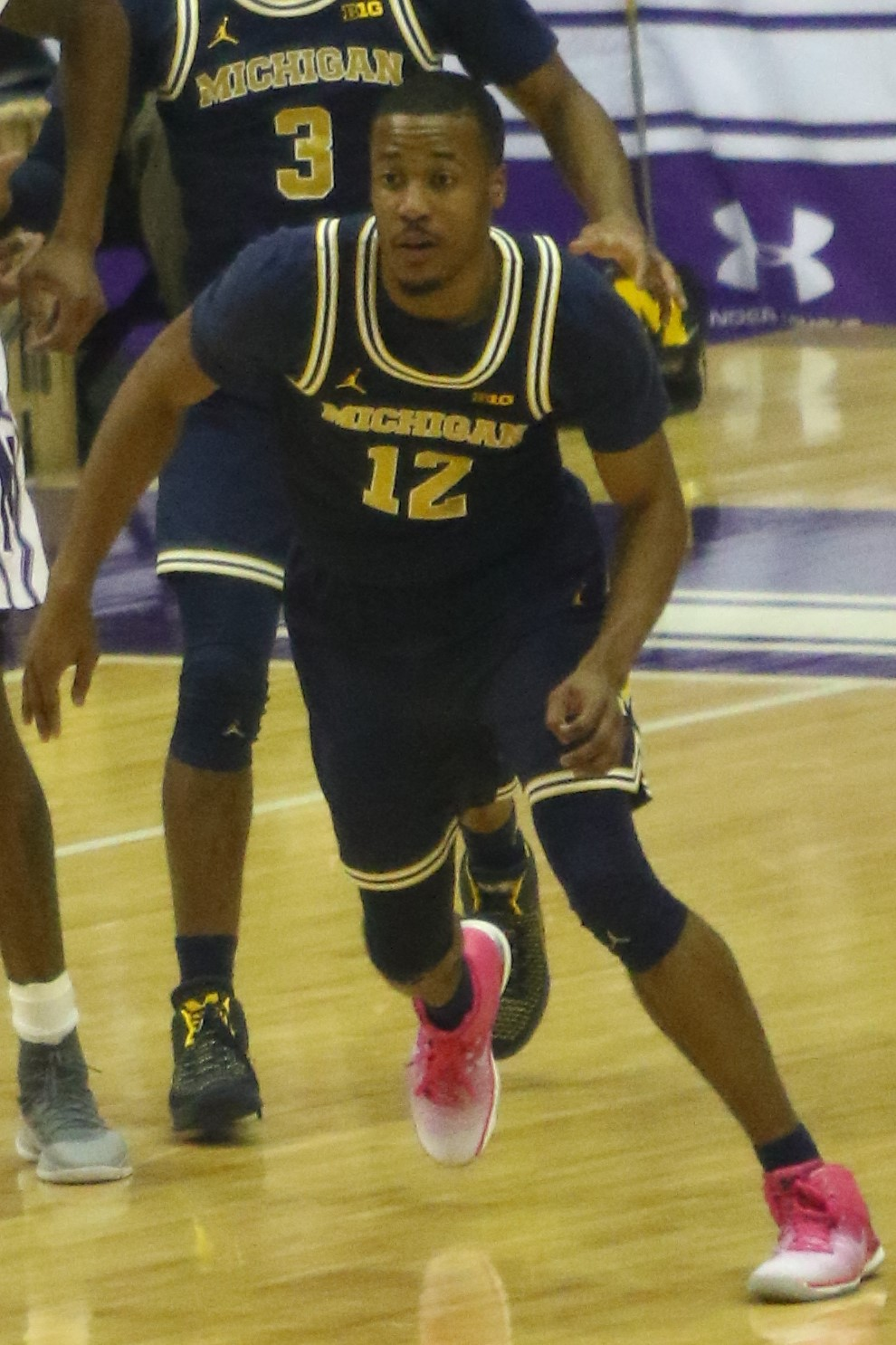
Abdur-Rahkman for the 2017–18 Wolverines

On December 2, Michigan defeated Indiana 69–55 in its Big Ten conference opener as Abdur Rahkman posted a career-high 11 rebounds. Abdur-Rahkman's first career double-double (17 points and 10 rebounds), helped Michigan defeat Texas 59–52 on December 12. 2017. On January 15, 2018, Abdur-Rahkman scored his 1,000th point on a pair of game-winning free throws with 1.2 seconds remaining in a 68–67 win against Maryland. On January 25, Abdur-Rahkman posted a then career-high 26 points in an 88–92 loss to (#3 AP Poll/#3 Coaches Poll) Purdue. On February 3 against Minnesota, Abdur-Rahkman posted 17 points, including a three-point play with 3.8 seconds remaining, to give Michigan a 76–73 overtime victory. On his senior day on February 18, Abdur-Rahkman led Michigan (with 17 points) to a 74–62 victory over (#8 AP Poll/#9 Coaches Poll) Ohio State. Prior to the game Michigan honored seniors Abdur-Rahkman, Duncan Robinson, graduate student Jaaron Simmons and undergraduate student assistant Austin Hatch. On February 24, Abdur-Rahkman posted a career-high 28 points in an 85–61 victory over Maryland in the regular season finale. Following the 2017–18 Big Ten Conference men's basketball regular season, Abdur-Rahkman ranked second nationally with a 5.0 assists/turnover ratio and was named an honorable mention All-Big Ten selection by both the coaches and the media. On March 2, Michigan defeated Nebraska 77–58 in the quarterfinals of the 2018 Big Ten Conference men's basketball tournament. Michigan was led by Abdur-Rahkman with 21 points (5–5 three point shots), who became the second player in the history of the Big Ten Conference men's basketball tournament to be perfect on at least 5 three-point shots in a single game. In the March 4, 2018 Big Ten tournament championship game against Purdue, Abdur-Rahkman scored 15 points to help lead Michigan to their second consecutive Big Ten tournament championship. He was named the All-tournament team. Rahkman averaged 15.0 points per game, shot 64.7% (11–17) on three-point shots and had a 5.5:1 assist-to-turnover ration during the tournament. Abdur-Rahkman, who posted a game-high 12 points (along with Moritz Wagner), was the main ballhandler on a set play from the defensive baseline with 3.6 seconds left in the 2018 NCAA Division I men's basketball tournament second-round game against (#21 AP Poll/#19 Coaches Poll) Houston on March 17, 2018, and got the assist by setting up Jordan Poole for a buzzer beater three point shot resulting in a 64–63 win and a trip to the Sweet Sixteen. Abdur-Rahkman, who averaged 14.0 points, 4.3 rebounds and 3.5 assists in the first four games of the NCAA tournament, was joined by Charles Matthews and Wagner on the West Region All-tournament team. On April 2, Michigan lost to (#2 Coaches Poll/#2 AP Poll) Villanova 62–79 in the National Championship Game. Michigan was led by Abdur-Rahkman with 23 points, who finished his collegiate career as Michigan's all-time leader in games played with 144 games. Since the team reached the championship games of both the Big Ten tournament and the NCAA Tournament, Rahkman shares the Michigan (and NCAA) single-season games played record (41) with teammates Robinson, Jon Teske, Zavier Simpson and Matthews. Members of the 2010–11 Connecticut Huskies also played 41 games (an NCAA record). Rahkman is the only Wolverine to have played in 13 Big Ten men's basketball tournament games. Zavier Simpson surpassed Abdur-Rahkman for the career games played record.

== Professional career ==
Prior to the 2018 NBA draft, Abdur-Rahkman was only able to work out with one team due to a broken foot, ultimately going undrafted. On October 4, 2018, he signed with the Canton Charge of the NBA G League. He posted 7 points, 3 rebounds and 2 assists in the season opener on November 3 against the Wisconsin Herd.

On June 7, 2021, he has signed with Legia Warszawa of the Polish Basketball League.

On July 20, 2022, he has signed with Victoria Libertas Pesaro of the Italian Lega Basket Serie A (LBA).

On June 28, 2023, he signed with Darüşşafaka Lassa of the Basketbol Süper Ligi (BSL).

On June 21, 2024, he signed with Bilbao of the Spanish Liga ACB.

On July 3, 2025, he signed with Treviso Basket of the Lega Basket Serie A (LBA).

== Personal life ==
Abdur-Rahkman is a non-practicing Muslim.
