= 2017–18 Big Ten Conference men's basketball season =

- League: NCAA Division I
- Sport: Basketball
- Teams: 14
- TV partner(s): Big Ten Network, ESPN, Fox, FS1 CBS

2017–18 NCAA Division I men's basketball season
- Regular season champions: Michigan State
- Runners-up: Purdue and Ohio State
- Season MVP: Keita Bates-Diop, Ohio State
- Top scorer: Keita Bates-Diop

Tournament
- Venue: Madison Square Garden, New York City, New York
- Champions: Michigan
- Runners-up: Purdue
- Finals MVP: Moritz Wagner

Basketball seasons
- 2016–17 2018–19

2017–18 Big Ten Conference men's basketball standings
	Conf.				Overall
Team	W		L	PCT	W		L	PCT
No. 5 Michigan State	16	–	2	.889	30	–	5	.857
No. 11 Purdue	15	–	3	.833	30	–	7	.811
No. 17 Ohio State	15	–	3	.833	25	–	9	.735
No. 7 Michigan †	13	–	5	.722	33	–	8	.805
Nebraska	13	–	5	.722	22	–	11	.667
Penn State	9	–	9	.500	26	–	13	.667
Indiana	9	–	9	.500	16	–	15	.516
Maryland	8	–	10	.444	19	–	13	.594
Wisconsin	7	–	11	.389	15	–	18	.455
Northwestern	6	–	12	.333	15	–	17	.469
Minnesota	4	–	14	.222	15	–	17	.469
Illinois	4	–	14	.222	14	–	18	.438
Iowa	4	–	14	.222	14	–	19	.424
Rutgers	3	–	15	.167	15	–	19	.441
† 2018 Big Ten tournament winner Rankings from AP poll

The 2017–18 Big Ten men's basketball season began with practices in October 2017, followed by the start of the 2017–18 NCAA Division I men's basketball season in November. The 2018 Big Ten tournament was held at Madison Square Garden in New York City. Due to the Big East's use of that venue for the 2018 Big East tournament, the Big Ten tournament took place one week earlier than usual, ending the week before Selection Sunday. As a result, the conference season began on December 1, 2017 and concluded on February 25, 2018. Each team played one road game and one home conference game in the first week of December. With a win over Wisconsin on February 25, 2018, Michigan State clinched the outright Big Ten championship, their eighth under Tom Izzo.

The Big Ten tournament was held from February 28 through March 4, 2018 at Madison Square Garden. Michigan defeated Purdue to win its second consecutive tournament. As a result, the Wolverines received the conference's automatic bid to the NCAA tournament. Four Big Ten schools (Michigan, Michigan State, Ohio State, and Purdue) were invited to the NCAA tournament, the fewest Big Ten teams selected for the Tournament since 2008. Michigan was the National Runner-up, losing to Villanova in the NCAA championship game. Nebraska and Penn State received invitations to the National Invitation Tournament. Penn State won the NIT championship.

Ohio State forward Keita Bates-Diop was named Big Ten Player of the Year. Ohio State head coach Chris Holtmann was named Big Ten Coach of the Year. Bates-Diop and Michigan State forward Miles Bridges were consensus All-Americans, while Purdue guard Carsen Edwards earned second and third team All-American recognition. Edwards won the Jerry West Award.

The season also marked the last time the conference played an 18-game conference schedule. The 2018–19 season marked the first time in Big Ten history that the teams will play a 20-game conference schedule.

== Head coaches ==
=== Coaching changes ===
On March 11, 2017, Illinois fired head coach John Groce. On March 18, the school hired Brad Underwood as the new head coach.

On March 16, 2017, Indiana fired Tom Crean after nine years as head coach. On March 25, 2017, the school hired Archie Miller as head coach.

On June 5, 2017, Ohio State announced that head coach Thad Matta would not return as head coach after 13 years in Columbus. On June 9, the school hired Chris Holtmann as head coach.

=== Coaches ===
Team	Head coach	Previous job	Years at school	Overall record	Big Ten record	Big Ten titles	NCAA tournaments	NCAA Final Fours	NCAA Championships
Illinois	Brad Underwood	Oklahoma State	1	14–18	4–14	0	0	0	0
Indiana	Archie Miller	Dayton	1	16–15	9–9	0	0	0	0
Iowa	Fran McCaffery	Siena	8	151–120	68–76	0	3	0	0
Maryland	Mark Turgeon	Texas A&M	7	157–81	49–30*	0	3	0	0
Michigan	John Beilein	West Virginia	11	248–143	111–87	2	8	2	0
Michigan State	Tom Izzo	Michigan State (Asst.)	23	574–225	269–122	8	21	7	1
Minnesota	Richard Pitino	Florida International	5	90–78	31–59	0	1	0	0
Nebraska	Tim Miles	Colorado State	6	97–97	46–62	0	1	0	0
Northwestern	Chris Collins	Duke (Asst.)	5	88–77	36–54	0	1	0	0
Ohio State	Chris Holtmann	Butler	1	25–9	15–3	0	1	0	0
Penn State	Pat Chambers	Boston University	7	113–122	38–87	0	0	0	0
Purdue	Matt Painter	Purdue (Assoc.)	13	295–149	142–88	2	10	0	0
Rutgers	Steve Pikiell	Stony Brook	2	30–37	6–30	0	0	0	0
Wisconsin	Greg Gard	Wisconsin (Assoc.)	3	57–36	31–23	0	2	0	0

Notes:

- All records, appearances, titles, etc. are from time with current school only.
- Year at school includes 2017–18 season.
- Overall and Big Ten records are from time at current school and are through the end of the season.
- Turgeon's ACC conference record excluded since Maryland began Big Ten Conference play in 2014–15.

== Preseason ==
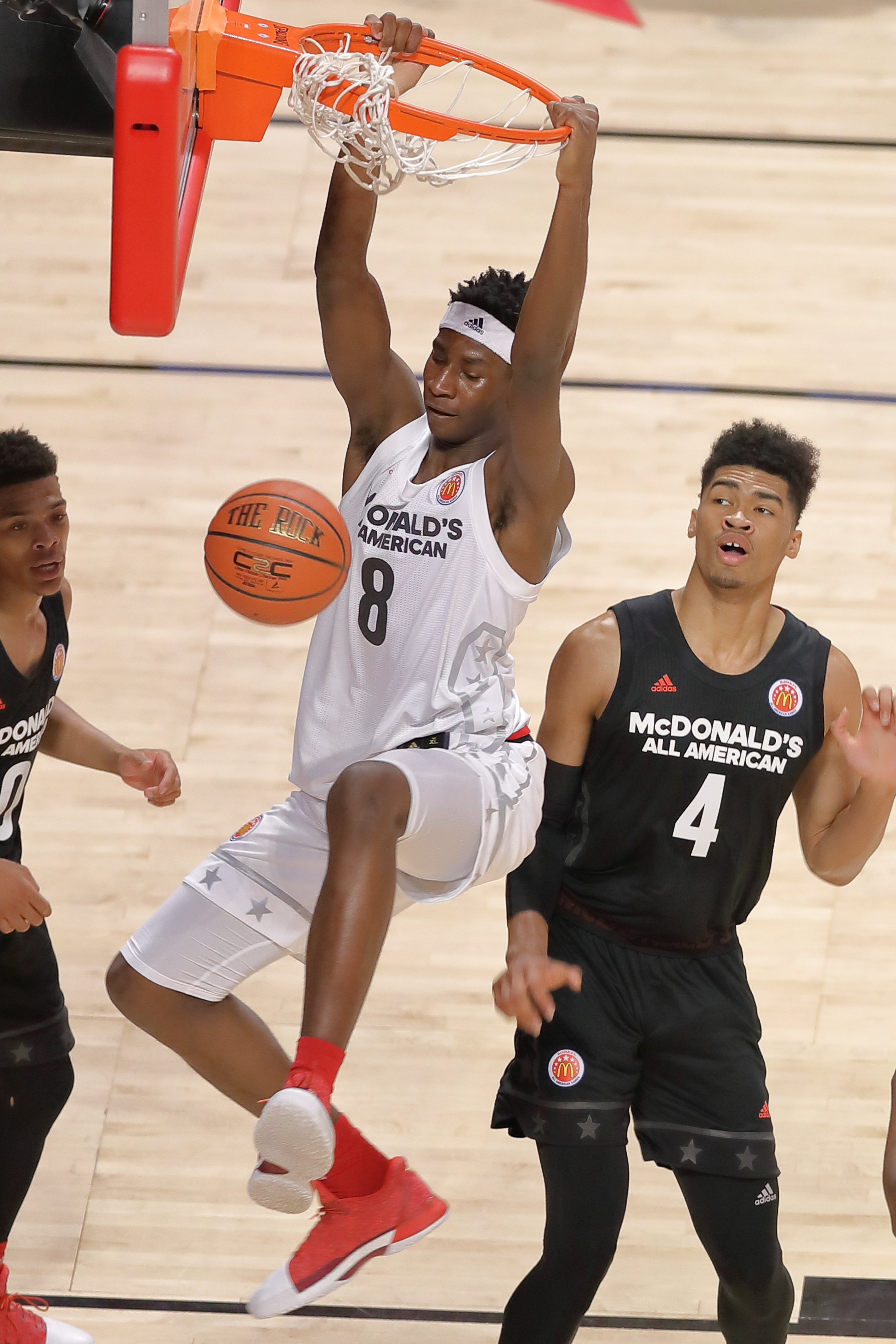
Michigan State Jaren Jackson Jr. at the 2017 McDonald's All-American Boys Game

=== Preseason All-Big Ten ===
Prior to the conference's annual media day, unofficial awards and a poll were chosen by a panel of 28 writers, two for each team in the conference. Michigan State was a unanimous selection to win the conference, receiving all 28 votes. The Spartans' Miles Bridges was also a unanimous selection for Preseason Player of the Year.

==== Preseason conference poll ====
Rank	Team
1	Michigan State (28)
2	Purdue
3	Minnesota
4	Northwestern
5	Maryland
5	Michigan
7	Wisconsin
8	Iowa
9	Indiana
10	Penn State
11	Ohio State
12	Illinois
13	Nebraska
14	Rutgers
(first place votes)

==== Preseason All-Big Ten ====
On October 19, 2017, a panel of conference media selected a 10-member preseason All-Big Ten Team and Player of the Year.

Honor	Recipient
Preseason Player of the Year	Miles Bridges, Michigan State
Preseason All-Big Ten Team	Miles Bridges*, Michigan State
Preseason All-Big Ten Team	Amir Coffey, Minnesota
Preseason All-Big Ten Team	Vincent Edwards, Purdue
Preseason All-Big Ten Team	Ethan Happ*, Wisconsin
Preseason All-Big Ten Team	Justin Jackson, Maryland
Preseason All-Big Ten Team	Scottie Lindsey, Northwestern
Preseason All-Big Ten Team	Nate Mason, Minnesota
Preseason All-Big Ten Team	Bryant McIntosh*, Northwestern
Preseason All-Big Ten Team	Moritz Wagner, Michigan
Preseason All-Big Ten Team	Nick Ward, Michigan State
*Unanimous selections

=== Preseason watchlists ===
Below is a table of notable preseason watch lists.

	Wooden	Naismith	Robertson	Cousy	West	Erving	Malone	Abdul-Jabbar	Olson	Tisdale	Notes
Jordan Bohannon, Iowa				✓							
Miles Bridges, Michigan State	✓	✓	✓			✓			✓		
Vincent Edwards, Purdue	✓	✓				✓					
Isaac Haas, Purdue								✓			
Ethan Happ, Wisconsin	✓	✓	✓					✓	✓		
Jaren Jackson Jr., Michigan State	✓										
Justin Jackson, Maryland		✓				✓					
Nate Mason, Minnesota	✓	✓		✓							
Bryant McIntosh, Northwestern	✓			✓							
Jordan Murphy, Minnesota							✓				
Moritz Wagner, Michigan	✓	✓					✓				
Nick Ward, Michigan State		✓									

=== Preseason national polls ===
	AP	Athlon; Sports	Bleacher; Report	Blue Ribbon; Yearbook	CBS Sports	Coaches	ESPN	Lindy's; Sports	NBC Sports	SBNation	Sports; Illustrated	USBWA
Illinois												
Indiana												
Iowa												
Maryland												
Michigan												
Michigan State	2	2	2	2	4	2	3	1	1	3	2	1
Minnesota	15	16	20	18	13	15	10	22	20	18		17
Nebraska												
Northwestern	19	24	25	23	14	20	18	15	21	22	22	20
Ohio State												
Penn State												
Purdue	20	18		14	24	21			25	21	17	18
Rutgers												
Wisconsin												

== Regular season ==
=== 2017 ACC–Big Ten Challenge (ACC 11–3) ===
Date	Time	ACC team	B1G team	Score	Location	Television	Attendance	Challenge leader
Nov 27	7:00 pm	**Syracuse**	Maryland	72–70	Carrier Dome • Syracuse, New York	ESPN2	20,852	ACC (1–0)
Nov 27	9:00 pm	No. 18 **Virginia**	Wisconsin	49–37	John Paul Jones Arena • Charlottesville, Virginia	ESPN2	13,911	ACC (2–0)
Nov 28	7:00 pm	**Florida State**	Rutgers	78–73	Louis Brown Athletic Center • Piscataway, New Jersey	ESPNU	4,853	ACC (3–0)
Nov 28	7:15 pm	**Georgia Tech**	Northwestern	52–51	McCamish Pavilion • Atlanta, Georgia	ESPN2	5,562	ACC (4–0)
Nov 28	8:00 pm	No. 17 Louisville	**Purdue**	66–57	Mackey Arena • West Lafayette, Indiana	ESPN	14,804	ACC (4–1)
Nov 28	9:00 pm	**Wake Forest**	Illinois	80–73	LJVM Coliseum • Winston-Salem, North Carolina	ESPN2	5,782	ACC (5–1)
Nov 28	9:15 pm	**Virginia Tech**	Iowa	79–55	Cassell Coliseum • Blacksburg, Virginia	ESPNU	7,101	ACC (6–1)
Nov 29	7:15 pm	**Clemson**	Ohio State	79–65	Value City Arena • Columbus, Ohio	ESPN2	17,189	ACC (7–1)
Nov 29	7:15 pm	**NC State**	Penn State	85–78	PNC Arena • Raleigh, North Carolina	ESPNU	15,270	ACC (8–1)
Nov 29	7:30 pm	No. 13 **North Carolina**	Michigan	86–71	Dean Smith Center • Chapel Hill, North Carolina	ESPN	19,036	ACC (9–1)
Nov 29	9:00 pm	No. 10 **Miami**	No. 12 Minnesota	86–81	Williams Arena • Minneapolis, Minnesota	ESPN2	14,625	ACC (10–1)
Nov 29	9:15 pm	Boston College	**Nebraska**	71–62	Pinnacle Bank Arena • Lincoln, Nebraska	ESPNU	10,742	ACC (10–2)
Nov 29	9:30 pm	No. 1 **Duke**	Indiana	91–81	Simon Skjodt Assembly Hall • Bloomington, Indiana	ESPN	17,222	ACC (11–2)
Nov 30	7:00 pm	No. 5 Notre Dame	No. 3 **Michigan State**	81–63	Breslin Center • East Lansing, Michigan	ESPN	14,797	ACC (11–3)
**Winners are in bold** Game times in EST. Rankings from AP Poll (Nov 27). Pittsburgh did not play due to the ACC having one more team than the B1G.

=== 2017 Gavitt Tipoff Games (Tied 4–4) ===
Date	Time	Big East team	Big Ten team	Score	Location	Television	Attendance	Leader
Mon., Nov. 13	6:30 PM	Providence	No. 14 **Minnesota**	86–74	Dunkin' Donuts Center • Providence, RI	FS1	10,214	Big Ten (1–0)
Tue., Nov. 14	8:30 PM	Marquette	No. 19 **Purdue**	86–71	BMO Harris Bradley Center • Milwaukee, WI	FS1	13,307	Big Ten (2–0)
Wed., Nov. 15	6:30 PM	No. 22 **Seton Hall**	Indiana	84–68	Prudential Center • Newark, NJ	FS1	8,452	Big Ten (2–1)
Wed., Nov. 15	8:30 PM	Butler	**Maryland**	79–65	Xfinity Center • College Park, MD	FS1	16,317	Big Ten (3–1)
Wed., Nov. 15	9:00 PM	**Creighton**	No. 20 Northwestern	92–88	Allstate Arena • Rosemont, IL	BTN	6,384	Big Ten (3–2)
Thu., Nov. 16	6:30 PM	**St. John's**	Nebraska	79–56	Carnesecca Arena • New York City, NY	FS1	4,652	Tied (3–3)
Thu., Nov. 16	8:30 PM	No. 15 **Xavier**	Wisconsin	80–70	Kohl Center • Madison, WI	FS1	17,287	Big East (4–3)
Fri., Nov. 17	8:30 PM	DePaul	**Illinois**	82–73	State Farm Center • Champaign, IL	BTN	11,254	Tied (4–4)
**WINNERS ARE IN BOLD**. Game Times in EST. Rankings from AP Poll (Nov 13). Sources: Did not participate: Georgetown; Villanova (Big East); Iowa, Michigan, Michigan State, Ohio State, Penn State, Rutgers (Big Ten)

=== Rankings ===
Legend
	Improvement in ranking
	Drop in ranking
	Not ranked previous week
RV	Received votes but were not ranked in Top 25 of poll
(Italics)	Number of first place votes

		Pre/ Wk 1	Wk 2	Wk 3	Wk 4	Wk 5	Wk 6	Wk 7	Wk 8	Wk 9	Wk 10	Wk 11	Wk 12	Wk 13	Wk 14	Wk 15	Wk 16	Wk 17	Wk 18	Wk 19	Final
Illinois	AP																				
Illinois	C																				
Indiana	AP																				
Indiana	C																				
Iowa	AP																				
Iowa	C																				
Maryland	AP	RV	RV	RV	RV																
Maryland	C	RV	RV	RV																	
Michigan	AP	RV	RV	RV				RV	RV		RV	23	25	24	20	22	17	15	7	7	
Michigan	C	RV		RV	RV	RV		RV	RV	RV	RV	24	25	25	20	21	16	13	7	7	2
Michigan State	AP	2 (13)	2 (13)	4	3	3	2 (19)	2 (15)	2 (15)	1 (43)	4	9	6	5	4	2 (21)	2 (19)	2 (17)	4	5	
Michigan State	C	2 (9)	2 (9)	5	3	3 (1)	2 (10)	2 (6)	2 (5)	1 (25)	4	9	6	4	4	1 (17)	1 (20)	2 (15)	5	5	11
Minnesota	AP	15	14	14	12	14	RV	RV	RV												
Minnesota	C	15	15	15	12	15	RV														
Nebraska	AP														RV	RV			RV		
Nebraska	C															RV	RV	RV			
Northwestern	AP	19	20	RV	RV																
Northwestern	C	20	20	RV																	
Ohio State	AP										RV	22	13	17	14	8	16	13	17	17	
Ohio State	C										RV	22	13	18	16	9	15	14	16	17	21
Penn State	AP																RV				
Penn State	C																				RV
Purdue	AP	20	19	18	RV	21	17	16	14	13	5	3 (1)	3 (1)	3 (1)	3 (1)	6	9	8	10	11	
Purdue	C	21	21	16	RV	21	17	16	13	12	7	3 (1)	3 (1)	3 (1)	3 (1)	7	9	8	10	11	9
Rutgers	AP																				
Rutgers	C																				
Wisconsin	AP	RV	RV																		
Wisconsin	C	RV	RV	RV																	

=== Player of the week ===
Throughout the conference regular season, the Big Ten offices named one or two players of the week and one or two freshmen of the week each Monday.

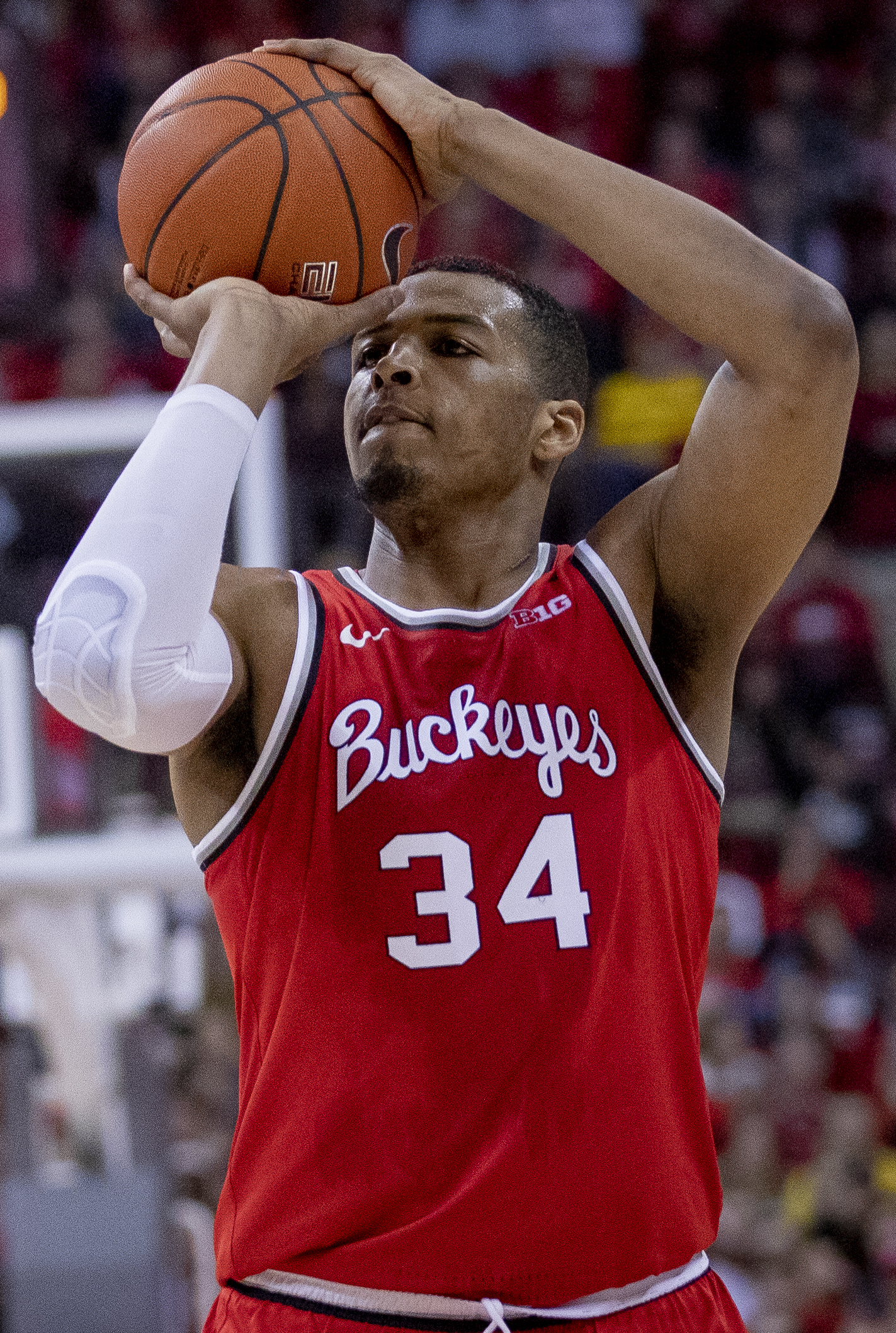
Kaleb Wesson

Week	Player of the week	Freshman of the week
November 13, 2017	Jordan Murphy, MINN	Luka Garza, IOWA
November 20, 2017	Jordan Murphy (2), MINN	Darryl Morsell, MD
November 27, 2017	Jordan Murphy (3), MINN	Jaren Jackson Jr., MSU
November 27, 2017	Jordan Murphy (3), MINN	Brad Davison, WISC
December 4, 2017	Isaac Haas, PUR	Kaleb Wesson, OSU
December 11, 2017	Keita Bates-Diop, OSU	Jaren Jackson Jr. (2), MSU
December 18, 2017	Juwan Morgan, IND	Geo Baker, RUT
December 26, 2017	Miles Bridges, MSU	Trent Frazier, ILL
January 2, 2018	Nick Ward, MSU	Luka Garza (2), IOWA
January 8, 2018	Keita Bates-Diop (2), OSU	Bruno Fernando, MD
January 15, 2018	Keita Bates-Diop (3), OSU	Jaren Jackson Jr. (3), MSU
January 22, 2018	James Palmer Jr., NEB	Kaleb Wesson (2), OSU
January 22, 2018	Carsen Edwards, PUR	Kaleb Wesson (2), OSU
January 29, 2018	Vincent Edwards, PUR	Jaren Jackson Jr. (4), MSU
February 5, 2018	Keita Bates-Diop (4), OSU	Isaiah Washington, MINN
February 12, 2018	Miles Bridges (2), MSU	Trent Frazier (2), ILL
February 19, 2018	Tony Carr, PSU	Bruno Fernando (2), MD
February 26, 2018	Carsen Edwards (2), PUR	Brad Davison (2), WISC

=== Early season tournaments ===
Eleven of the 14 Big Ten teams participated in early season tournaments. Each team's finish is noted below. Illinois, Indiana, and Rutgers did not participate in a tournament. Eight Big Ten teams participated in the Gavitt Tip-Off Games against Big East Conference teams for the third consecutive year. All Big Ten teams participated in the ACC–Big Ten Challenge against Atlantic Coast Conference teams, the 19th year for the event.

Team	Tournament	Finish
Iowa	Cayman Islands Classic	7th
Maryland	Emerald Coast Classic	3rd
Michigan	Maui Invitational	5th
Michigan State	Phil Knight Invitational Victory Bracket	1st
Minnesota	Barclays Center Classic	2–0
Nebraska	AdvoCare Invitational	5th
Northwestern	Hall of Fame Tip Off Naismith Bracket	2nd
Ohio State	Phil Knight Invitational Motion Bracket	6th
Penn State	Legends Classic	2nd
Purdue	Battle 4 Atlantis	7th
Wisconsin	CBE Hall of Fame Classic	4th

=== Conference matrix ===
This table summarizes the head-to-head results between teams in conference play. Each team played 18 conference games, and at least one game against each opponent.

	Illinois	Indiana	Iowa	Maryland	Michigan	Michigan St	Minnesota	Nebraska	Northwestern	Ohio St	Penn St	Purdue	Rutgers	Wisconsin
vs. Illinois	–	1–1	1–0	1–0	1–0	2–0	1–0	1–1	1–0	1–0	1–0	0–0	0–2	2–0
vs. Indiana	1–1	–	0–2	0–1	1–0	2–0	0–2	1–0	0–1	2–0	0–1	1–0	0–1	1–0
vs. Iowa	0–1	2–0	–	1–0	2–0	1–0	1–1	1–0	0–1	2–0	2–0	1–0	1–0	0–1
vs. Maryland	0–1	1–0	0–1	–	2–0	2–0	0–1	1–0	0–2	1–0	1–1	2–0	0–1	0–1
vs. Michigan	0–1	0–1	0–2	0–2	–	0–1	0–1	1–0	1–1	1–1	0–1	2–0	0–1	0–1
vs. Michigan St	0–2	0–2	0–1	0–2	1–0	–	0–1	0–1	0–1	1–0	0–1	0–1	0–2	0–2
vs. Minnesota	0–1	2–0	1–1	1–0	1–0	1–0	–	2–0	2–0	1–0	0–1	2–0	0–1	1–0
vs. Nebraska	1–1	0–1	0–1	0–1	0–1	1–0	0–2	–	0–1	1–0	1–1	1–0	0–2	0–2
vs. Northwestern)	0–1	1–0	1–1	2–0	1–1	1–0	0–2	1–0	–	1–0	1–1	1–0	1–0	1–1
vs. Ohio State	0–1	0–2	0–2	0–1	1–1	0–1	0–1	0–1	0–1	–	2–0	0–1	0–2	0–1
vs. Penn State	0–1	1–0	0–2	1–1	1–0	1–0	1–0	1–1	1–1	0–2	–	1–0	0–1	1–0
vs. Purdue	0–1	0–1	0–1	0–2	0–2	1–0	0–2	0–1	0–1	1–0	0–1	–	0–2	1–1
vs. Rutgers	2–0	1–0	0–1	1–0	1–0	2–0	1–0	2–0	0–1	2–0	1–0	2–0	–	0–1
vs. Wisconsin	0–2	0–1	1–0	1–0	1–0	2–0	0–1	2–0	1–1	1–0	0–1	1–1	1–0	–
Total	**4–14**	**9–9**	**4–14**	**8–10**	**13–5**	**16–2**	**4–14**	**13–5**	**6–12**	**15–3**	**9–9**	**14–3**	**3–15**	**7–11**

The Big Ten led the nation in attendance with an average of 12,197, outpacing the SEC (11,628), ACC (10,773), Big 12 (10,376) and Big East (10,371). Of the 351 schools that compete in Division I basketball, the Big Ten continues to have several of the top-30 school averages: Wisconsin (4th, 17,272), Indiana (10th, 15,590), Nebraska (11th, 15,492), Michigan State (14th, 14,797), Maryland (15th, 14,675), Purdue (17th, 14,343), Ohio State (21st, 13,495), Illinois (25th, 12,613), Iowa (28th, 12,026) and Minnesota (29th, 11,850).

== Honors and awards ==
On January 9, 2018, Keita Bates-Diop was recognized as the Oscar Robertson National Player of the Week by the United States Basketball Writers Association. On January 15, Purdue was named NCAA.com team of the Week. On February 26, Carsen Edwards was named NCAA.com National Player of the Week.

=== All-Big Ten awards and teams ===
On February 26, 2018, the Big Ten announced most of its conference awards.

Honor	Coaches	Media
Player of the Year	Keita Bates-Diop, Ohio State	Keita Bates-Diop, Ohio State
Coach of the Year	Chris Holtmann, Ohio State	Chris Holtmann, Ohio State
Freshman of the Year	Jaren Jackson Jr., Michigan State	Jaren Jackson Jr., Michigan State
Defensive Player of the Year	Jaren Jackson Jr., Michigan State	Not Selected
Sixth Man of the Year	Duncan Robinson, Michigan	Not Selected
All-Big Ten First Team	Keita Bates-Diop, Ohio State	Keita Bates-Diop, Ohio State
All-Big Ten First Team	Miles Bridges, Michigan State	Miles Bridges, Michigan State
All-Big Ten First Team	Tony Carr, Penn State	Tony Carr, Penn State
All-Big Ten First Team	Carsen Edwards, Purdue	Carsen Edwards, Purdue
All-Big Ten First Team	James Palmer Jr., Nebraska	Ethan Happ, Wisconsin
All-Big Ten Second Team	Vincent Edwards, Purdue	Vincent Edwards, Purdue
All-Big Ten Second Team	Ethan Happ, Wisconsin	Juwan Morgan, Indiana
All-Big Ten Second Team	Juwan Morgan, Indiana	Jordan Murphy, Minnesota
All-Big Ten Second Team	Jae'Sean Tate, Ohio State	James Palmer Jr., Nebraska
All-Big Ten Second Team	Moritz Wagner, Michigan	Moritz Wagner, Michigan
All-Big Ten Third Team	Anthony Cowan Jr., Maryland	Anthony Cowan Jr., Maryland
All-Big Ten Third Team	Isaac Haas, Purdue	Isaac Haas, Purdue
All-Big Ten Third Team	Jaren Jackson Jr., Michigan State	Jaren Jackson Jr., Michigan State
All-Big Ten Third Team	Jordan Murphy, Minnesota	Nick Ward, Michigan State
All-Big Ten Third Team	Cassius Winston, Michigan State	Cassius Winston, Michigan State
All-Big Ten Honorable Mention	Muhammad-Ali Abdur-Rahkman, Michigan	Muhammad-Ali Abdur-Rahkman, Michigan
All-Big Ten Honorable Mention	Leron Black, Illinois	Leron Black, Illinois
All-Big Ten Honorable Mention	Tyler Cook, Iowa	Jordan Bohannon, Iowa
All-Big Ten Honorable Mention	Isaac Copeland Jr., Nebraska	Tyler Cook, Iowa
All-Big Ten Honorable Mention	Kevin Huerter, Maryland	Isaac Copeland Jr., Nebraska
All-Big Ten Honorable Mention	Robert Johnson, Indiana	Trent Frazier, Illinois
All-Big Ten Honorable Mention	Nate Mason, Minnesota	Kevin Huerter, Maryland
All-Big Ten Honorable Mention	Dakota Mathias, Purdue	Nate Mason, Minnesota
All-Big Ten Honorable Mention	Lamar Stevens, Penn State	Dakota Mathias, Purdue
All-Big Ten Honorable Mention	Nick Ward, Michigan State	Bryant McIntosh
All-Big Ten Honorable Mention	Not Selected	Dererk Pardon, Northwestern
All-Big Ten Honorable Mention	Not Selected	Lamar Stevens, Penn State
All-Big Ten Honorable Mention	Not Selected	Jae'Sean Tate, Ohio State
All-Big Ten Honorable Mention	Mike Watkins, Penn State	Mike Watkins, Penn State
All-Freshman Team	Jaren Jackson Jr., Michigan State	Not Selected
All-Freshman Team	Trent Frazier, Illinois	Not Selected
All-Freshman Team	Bruno Fernando, Maryland	Not Selected
All-Freshman Team	Kaleb Wesson, Ohio State	Not Selected
All-Freshman Team	Brad Davison, Wisconsin	Not Selected
All-Defensive Team	Anthony Cowan Jr., Maryland	Not Selected
All-Defensive Team	Jaren Jackson Jr., Michigan State	Not Selected
All-Defensive Team	Josh Reaves, Penn State	Not Selected
All-Defensive Team	Mike Watkins, Penn State	Not Selected
All-Defensive Team	Dakota Mathias, Purdue	Not Selected

=== USBWA ===
On March 6, the U.S. Basketball Writers Association released its 2017–18 Men's All-District Teams, based upon voting from its national membership. There were nine regions from coast to coast, and a player and coach of the year were selected in each. The following lists all the Big Ten representatives selected within their respective regions.

District II (NY, NJ, DE, DC, PA, WV)
- Tony Carr, Penn State
District III (VA, NC, SC, MD)
- none
District V (OH, IN, IL, MI, MN, WI)

Player of the Year

- Keita Bates-Diop, Ohio State

Coach of the Year

- Chris Holtmann, Ohio State

All-District Team

- Keita Bates-Diop, Ohio State
- Miles Bridges, Michigan State
- Carsen Edwards, Purdue
- Vincent Edwards, Purdue
- Ethan Happ, Wisconsin
- Juwan Morgan, Indiana
- Moritz Wagner, Michigan
- Cassius Winston, Michigan State
District VI (IA, MO, KS, OK, NE, ND, SD)
- James Palmer Jr., Nebraska

=== NABC ===
The National Association of Basketball Coaches announced their Division I All-District teams on March 13, recognizing the nation's best men's collegiate basketball student-athletes. Selected and voted on by member coaches of the NABC, the selections on this list were then eligible for NABC Coaches' All-America Honors. The following list represented the District 7 players chosen to the list.

First Team

- Keita Bates-Diop, Ohio State
- Miles Bridges, Michigan State
- Carsen Edwards, Purdue
- James Palmer Jr., Nebraska
- Tony Carr, Penn State

Second Team

- Moritz Wagner, Michigan
- Vincent Edwards, Purdue
- Ethan Happ, Wisconsin
- Isaac Haas, Purdue
- Juwan Morgan, Indiana

=== Other awards ===
Keita Bates-Diop (1st team), Miles Bridges (2nd team) were selected as consensus 2018 All-American and Carsen Edwards earned several All- American recognitions. Edwards won the Jerry West Award.

== Postseason ==
=== Big Ten tournament ===
First round Wednesday, February 28
12	Iowa	96
13	Illinois	87
11	Minnesota	54
14	Rutgers	65

Second round Thursday, March 1
8	Maryland	54
9	Wisconsin	59
5	Michigan	77*
12	Iowa	71
7	Penn State	65
10	Northwestern	57
6	Indiana	69
14	Rutgers	76

Quarterfinals; Friday, March 2
1	Michigan State	63
9	Wisconsin	60
4	Nebraska	58
5	Michigan	77
2	Ohio State	68
7	Penn State	69
3	Purdue	82
14	Rutgers	75

Semifinals; Saturday, March 3 CBS
1	Michigan State	64
5	Michigan	75
7	Penn State	70
3	Purdue	78

Championship; Sunday, March 4 CBS
5	Michigan	75
3	Purdue	66

* denotes overtime period

=== NCAA tournament ===
The winner of the Big Ten tournament, Michigan, received the conference's automatic bid to the 2018 NCAA Division I men's basketball tournament.

Seed	Region	School	First Four	First round	Second round	Sweet Sixteen	Elite Eight	Final Four	Championship
3	West	Michigan	N/A	defeated (14) Montana 61–47	defeated (6) Houston 64–63	defeated (7) Texas A&M 99–72	defeated (9) Florida State 58–54	defeated (11) Loyola–Chicago 69–57	eliminated by (1) Villanova 62–79
3	Midwest	Michigan State	N/A	defeated (14) Bucknell 82–78	eliminated by (11) Syracuse 53–55				
5	West	Ohio State	N/A	defeated (12) South Dakota State 81–73	eliminated by (4) Gonzaga 84–90				
2	East	Purdue	N/A	defeated (15) Cal State Fullerton 74–58	defeated (10) Butler 76–73	eliminated by (3) Texas Tech 65–78			
		W–L (%):	0–0 (–)	4–0 (1.000)	2–2 (.500)	1–1 (.500)	1–0 (1.000)	1–0 (1.000)	0–1 (.000) Total: 9–4 (.692)

=== National Invitation tournament ===
Two Big Ten teams received invitations to the National Invitation Tournament: Nebraska and Penn State. Penn State won the championship.

Seed	Bracket	School	First round	Second round	Quarterfinals	Semifinals	Finals
5	Baylor	Nebraska	eliminated by Mississippi State 59–66				
4	Notre Dame	Penn State	defeated Temple 63–57	defeated Notre Dame 73–63	defeated Marquette 85–80	defeated Mississippi State 75–60	defeated Utah 82–66
		W–L (%):	1–1 (.500)	1–0 (1.000)	1–0 (1.000)	1–0 (1.000)	1–0 (1.000) Total: 5–1 (.833)

=== 2018 NBA draft ===
The following All-Big Ten selections were listed as seniors: Ohio State's Jae'Sean Tate, Purdue's Vincent Edwards and Isaac Haas. Additionally, Michigan State's Miles Bridges and Jaren Jackson Jr. announced that they would enter the draft and sign with an agent. Penn State's Tony Carr also announced he would enter the draft and sign with and agent. Moritz Wagner hired an agent. Several other players announced that they would test the draft process, but did not hire an agent, including Wisconsin's Ethan Happ, Purdue's Carsen Edwards, Nebraska's James Palmer Jr., Michigan State's Nick Ward, Michigan's Charles Matthews, and Indiana's Juwan Morgan. These players all withdrew from the draft and returned to school.

Four 2017–18 Big Ten Conference men's basketball season players were drafted in the first round of the 2018 draft (Jaren Jackson Jr. — 4th, Bridges — 12th, Kevin Huerter — 19th, Wagner — 25th) and eight were drafted overall in the draft (Justin Jackson — 43rd, Bates-Diop — 48th, Carr — 51st, Edwards — 52nd).

Rnd.	Pick	Player	Pos.	Team	School
1	4	Jaren Jackson Jr.	PF	Memphis Grizzlies	Michigan State (Fr.)
1	12	Miles Bridges	SF	Los Angeles Clippers (from Detroit, (Note: January 29, 2018: Detroit Pistons to Los Angeles Clippers: L.A. Clippers acquired Avery Bradley, Tobias Harris, Boban Marjanović, and a top-4 protected 2018 first-round pick; Detroit acquired Blake Griffin, Brice Johnson, and Willie Reed) traded to Charlotte) (Note: June 21, 2018: Charlotte Hornets to Los Angeles Clippers: Los Angeles Clippers acquired Charlotte's first-round pick (No. 11 – Shai Gilgeous-Alexander); Charlotte acquired the Los Angeles Clippers' first-round pick (No. 12 – Miles Bridges) and two future second-round selections)	Michigan State (So.)
1	19	Kevin Huerter	SG	Atlanta Hawks (from Minnesota) (Note: February 10, 2015: Minnesota Timberwolves to Atlanta Hawks: Atlanta acquired a lottery protected 2018 first-round pick; Minnesota acquired Adreian Payne)	Maryland (So.)
1	25	Moritz Wagner	PF	Los Angeles Lakers (from Cleveland via Portland and Cleveland) (Note: February 18, 2016: Cleveland Cavaliers to Portland Trail Blazers: Portland acquired Anderson Varejão and a 2018 protected first-round pick; Cleveland acquired a 2020 second-round pick; January 6, 2017: Portland Trail Blazers to Cleveland Cavaliers: Cleveland reacquired their rights to that 2018 protected first-round pick (protections removed); Portland acquired a 2017 first-round pick; February 8, 2018: Cleveland Cavaliers to Los Angeles Lakers: L.A. Lakers acquired Isaiah Thomas, Channing Frye and a top-3 protected 2018 first-round pick; Cleveland acquired Jordan Clarkson and Larry Nance Jr.)	Michigan (Jr.)
2	43	Justin Jackson	SF	Denver Nuggets (from L.A. Clippers via Philadelphia and New York, (Note: February 20, 2014: Los Angeles Clippers to Philadelphia 76ers: Philadelphia acquired Byron Mullens and a 2018 second-round pick (which would later be swapped with the New York Knicks); L.A. Clippers acquired a protected 2014 second-round pick (which ultimately wasn't conveyed)) (Note: October 27, 2014: New York Knicks to Philadelphia 76ers: Philadelphia acquired Travis Outlaw, the right to swap 2018 second-round picks between New York and the L.A. Clippers, and a 2019 second-round pick; New York acquired Arnett Moultrie) (Note: February 8, 2018: Denver Nuggets to Dallas Mavericks (three-team trade with New York): Dallas acquired Doug McDermott and the Portland Trail Blazers' 2018 second-round pick from Dallas; Denver acquired Devin Harris from Dallas and the L.A. Clippers' 2018 second-round pick from New York; New York acquired Emmanuel Mudiay from Denver) traded to Orlando) (Note: June 21, 2018: Orlando Magic to Denver Nuggets: Denver acquired Orlando's second-round pick (No. 41 – Jarred Vanderbilt); Orlando acquired Denver's second-round pick (No. 43 – Justin Jackson) and a future second-round selection)	Maryland (So.)
2	48	Keita Bates-Diop	SF	Minnesota Timberwolves	Ohio State (Jr.)
2	51	Tony Carr	PG	New Orleans Pelicans (from New Orleans via Miami, New Orleans and Chicago) (Note: February 18, 2016: New Orleans Pelicans to Miami Heat: Miami acquired a top-55 protected 2018 second-round pick; New Orleans acquired Jarnell Stokes and cash considerations; July 10, 2016: Miami Heat to New Orleans Pelicans: New Orleans reacquired their own 2018 second-round pick (protections removed); Miami acquired Luke Babbitt; September 1, 2017: New Orleans Pelicans to Chicago Bulls: Chicago acquired Quincy Pondexter, a 2018 second-round pick, and cash considerations; New Orleans acquired the player rights to Ater Majok) (Note: February 1, 2018: New Orleans Pelicans to Chicago Bulls: Chicago acquired Tony Allen, Jameer Nelson, Ömer Aşık, a top-5 protected 2018 first-round pick, and the rights to swap 2021 second-round picks; New Orleans acquired Nikola Mirotić and reacquired their 2018 second-round pick once again)	Penn State (So.)
2	52	Vincent Edwards	SF	Utah Jazz(traded to Houston) (Note: June 21, 2018: Utah Jazz to Houston Rockets: Houston acquired Utah's second-round pick; Utah acquired cash considerations)	Purdue (Sr.)

==== Pre-draft trades ====
Before the day of the draft, the following trades were made and resulted in exchanges of draft picks between the teams below.

==== Draft-day trades ====
Draft-day trades occurred on June 21, 2018, the day of the draft.
