= 2017–18 Northwestern Wildcats men's basketball team =

American college basketball season

2017–18 Northwestern Wildcats men's basketball
- Conference: Big Ten Conference
- Record: 15–17 (6–12 Big Ten)
- Head coach: Chris Collins (5th season)
- Assistant coaches: Brian James; Billy Donlon; Armon Gates
- Home arena: Allstate Arena

2017–18 Big Ten Conference men's basketball standings
	Conf.				Overall
Team	W		L	PCT	W		L	PCT
No. 5 Michigan State	16	–	2	.889	30	–	5	.857
No. 11 Purdue	15	–	3	.833	30	–	7	.811
No. 17 Ohio State	15	–	3	.833	25	–	9	.735
No. 7 Michigan †	13	–	5	.722	33	–	8	.805
Nebraska	13	–	5	.722	22	–	11	.667
Penn State	9	–	9	.500	26	–	13	.667
Indiana	9	–	9	.500	16	–	15	.516
Maryland	8	–	10	.444	19	–	13	.594
Wisconsin	7	–	11	.389	15	–	18	.455
Northwestern	6	–	12	.333	15	–	17	.469
Minnesota	4	–	14	.222	15	–	17	.469
Illinois	4	–	14	.222	14	–	18	.438
Iowa	4	–	14	.222	14	–	19	.424
Rutgers	3	–	15	.167	15	–	19	.441
† 2018 Big Ten tournament winner Rankings from AP poll

The 2017–18 Northwestern Wildcats men's basketball team represented Northwestern University in the 2017–18 NCAA Division I men's basketball season. They were led by fifth-year head coach Chris Collins as members of the Big Ten Conference. They played their home games at Allstate Arena in Rosemont, Illinois while the university's Welsh-Ryan Arena, underwent renovations. A winning record in the Big Ten as well, a Round-of-32 NCAA appearance in 2016–17, and the return of all key offensive contributors led to big expectations for the 2017–18 season. But the Wildcats stumbled to a poor start, finishing the season with a disappointing 15–17 record, 6–12 in Big Ten play to finish in 10th place. They lost in the second round of the Big Ten tournament to Penn State.

== Previous season ==
The Wildcats finished the 2016–17 season 24–12, 10–8 in Big Ten play to finish in a tie for fifth place. In the Big Ten tournament, they defeated Rutgers and Maryland before losing to Wisconsin in the semifinals. They received the school's first ever bid to the NCAA tournament as a No. 8 seed in the West region. In the First Round, they defeated No. 9-seeded Vanderbilt before losing to No. 1-seeded Gonzaga in the second round.

== Offseason ==
=== Coaching changes ===
On June 20, 2017, assistant coach Patrick Baldwin left the school to become the head coach at Milwaukee. On June 26, the school hired Michigan assistant coach Billy Donlon to replace Baldwin.

=== Departures ===
Name	Number	Pos.	Height	Weight	Year	Hometown	Notes
Sanjay Lumpkin	34	G/F	6'6"	220	Senior	Wayzata, MN	Graduated
Nathan Taphorn	32	F	6'7"	215	Senior	Pekin, IL	Graduated

=== Incoming transfers ===
Name	Number	Pos.	Height	Weight	Year	Hometown	Previous School
A. J. Turner	21	F	6'7"	188	Junior	Mount Clemens, MI	Transferred from Boston College. Under NCAA transfer rules, Turner will have to sit out for the 2017–18 season. Will have two years of remaining eligibility.

=== Recruiting classes ===
==== 2017 recruiting class ====
College recruiting
Name	Hometown	School	Height	Weight	Commit date
Anthony Gaines; SG	New Hampton, New Hampshire	New Hampton School	6 ft 4 in (1.93 m)	190 lb (86 kg)	Sep 27, 2016
Anthony Gaines; SG	Recruit ratings: Scout: Rivals: (79)				
Overall recruit ranking:
Note: In many cases, Scout, Rivals, 247Sports, On3, and ESPN may conflict in their listings of height and weight.; In these cases, the average was taken. ESPN grades are on a 100-point scale.; Sources: "2017 Team Ranking". Rivals.

==== 2018 recruiting class ====
College recruiting (2018)
Name	Hometown	School	Height	Weight	Commit date
Jordan Lathon; PG	Grandview, MO	Grandview High School	6 ft 4 in (1.93 m)	190 lb (86 kg)	Jun 25, 2017
Jordan Lathon; PG	Recruit ratings: Scout: Rivals: 247Sports: ESPN:				
Pete Nance; SF	Richfield, OH	Revere High School	6 ft 8 in (2.03 m)	180 lb (82 kg)	Jun 29, 2017
Pete Nance; SF	Recruit ratings: Scout: Rivals: 247Sports: ESPN:				
Ryan Young; PF	Stewartsville, NJ	Bethlehem Catholic High School	6 ft 10 in (2.08 m)	210 lb (95 kg)	Aug 23, 2017
Ryan Young; PF	Recruit ratings: Scout: Rivals: 247Sports: ESPN:				
Miller Kopp; SF	Houston, TX	Houston Christian High School	6 ft 6 in (1.98 m)	200 lb (91 kg)	Sep 21, 2017
Miller Kopp; SF	Recruit ratings: Scout: Rivals: 247Sports: ESPN:				
Overall recruit ranking:
Note: In many cases, Scout, Rivals, 247Sports, On3, and ESPN may conflict in their listings of height and weight.; In these cases, the average was taken. ESPN grades are on a 100-point scale.; Sources: "2018 Northwestern Commits". Rivals.; "2018 Team Ranking". Rivals.

== Preseason ==
In its annual preseason preview, the Blue Ribbon Yearbook ranked Northwestern as No. 23 in the country.

== Roster ==
2017–18 Northwestern Wildcats men's basketball team
Players
Coaches

Pos.	#	Name	Height	Weight	Year	Previous school	Hometown
F	4	Vic Law	6 ft 7 in (2.01 m)	200 lb (91 kg)	RS Jr	Saint Rita	South Holland, IL
C	5	Dererk Pardon	6 ft 8 in (2.03 m)	235 lb (107 kg)	Jr	Villa Angela-St. Joseph	Cleveland, OH
G	10	Charlie Hall (W)	6 ft 5 in (1.96 m)	210 lb (95 kg)	Jr	Crossroads	Los Angeles, CA
G	11	Anthony Gaines	6 ft 4 in (1.93 m)	205 lb (93 kg)	Fr	New Hampton School (N.H.)	Kingston, NY
G	12	Isiah Brown	6 ft 2 in (1.88 m)	190 lb (86 kg)	So	Lakeside	Seattle, WA
F	14	Rapolas Ivanauskas	6 ft 9 in (2.06 m)	230 lb (104 kg)	RS Fr	Brewster Academy	Barrington, IL
G/F	20	Scottie Lindsey	6 ft 5 in (1.96 m)	210 lb (95 kg)	Sr	Fenwick	Hillsdale, IL
F	21	A. J. Turner (I) (redshirt)	6 ft 7 in (2.01 m)	188 lb (85 kg)	Jr	New Hampton School; Boston College	Mount Clemens, MI
G	23	Jordan Ash	6 ft 3 in (1.91 m)	200 lb (91 kg)	Jr	St. Joseph	Bolingbrook, IL
C	25	Barret Benson	6 ft 10 in (2.08 m)	240 lb (109 kg)	So	Hinsdale South	Chicago, IL
G	30	Bryant McIntosh (C)	6 ft 3 in (1.91 m)	200 lb (91 kg)	Sr	Greensburg Community	New Castle, IN
G	33	Tino Malnati (W)	6 ft 3 in (1.91 m)	190 lb (86 kg)	RS Fr	Wauwatosa West	Northfield, IL
F	35	Aaron Falzon	6 ft 8 in (2.03 m)	225 lb (102 kg)	RS So	Northfield Mount Hermon	Newton, MA
F	44	Gavin Skelly	6 ft 8 in (2.03 m)	235 lb (107 kg)	Sr	Westlake	Westlake, OH

Head coach

- Chris Collins (Duke)

Assistant coach(es)

- Brian James (Illinois State)
- Armon Gates (Kent State)
- Billy Donlon (UNC Wilmington)

Legend

- (C) Team captain
- (S) Suspended
- (I) Ineligible
- (W) Walk-on
- Injured
- Current redshirt

Roster

== Schedule and results ==
Date time, TV	Rank^{#}	Opponent^{#}	Result	Record	High points	High rebounds	High assists	Site (attendance) city, state
Regular season
Nov 10, 2017*; 7:30 pm, BTN+	No. 19	Loyola (MD)	W 79–75	1–0	26 – Lindsey	9 – Lindsey	7 – McIntosh	Allstate Arena (6,013); Rosemont, IL
Nov 13, 2017*; 7:00 pm, BTN+	No. 20	Saint Peter's; Hall of Fame Tip Off Campus Round	W 75–66	2–0	17 – McIntosh	7 – Tied	6 – Lindsey	Allstate Arena (5,101); Rosemont, IL
Nov 15, 2017*; 8:00 pm, BTN	No. 20	Creighton; Gavitt Tipoff Games	L 88–92	2–1	30 – Law	6 – Skelly	9 – McIntosh	Allstate Arena (6,384); Rosemont, IL
Nov 18, 2017*; 1:30 pm, ESPN3	No. 20	vs. La Salle; Hall of Fame Tip Off Naismith Bracket semifinals	W 82–74	3–1	21 – McIntosh	8 – Law	7 – McIntosh	Mohegan Sun Arena; Uncasville, CT
Nov 19, 2017*; 4:30 pm, ESPN2	No. 20	vs. Texas Tech; Hall of Fame Tip Off Naismith Bracket championship	L 49–85	3–2	20 – Lindsey	4 – Law	3 – McIntosh	Mohegan Sun Arena; Uncasville, CT
Nov 24, 2017*; 7:30 pm, BTN+		Sacred Heart; Hall of Fame Tip Off Campus Round	W 81–50	4–2	19 – Lindsey	6 – 2 tie	6 – McIntsoh	Allstate Arena (5,216); Rosemont, IL
Nov 28, 2017*; 6:15 pm, ESPN2		at Georgia Tech; ACC–Big Ten Challenge	L 51–52	4–3	18 – McIntosh	12 – Pardon	5 – McIntosh	Hank McCamish Pavilion (5,562); Atlanta, GA
Dec 1, 2017; 8:00 pm, BTN		Illinois	W 72–68 ^{OT}	5–3 (1–0)	22 – Lindsey	7 – Law	6 – McIntosh	Allstate Arena (10,017); Rosemont, IL
Dec 3, 2017; 3:00 pm, BTN		at Purdue	L 69-74	5–4 (1–1)	20 – Pardon	10 – Law	4 – 3 tied	Mackey Arena (14,360); West Lafayette, IN
Dec 11, 2017*; 6:00 pm, FS1		Chicago State	W 96–31	6–4	18 – Law	8 – Pardon	7 – McIntosh	Allstate Arena (5,007); Rosemont, IL
Dec 14, 2017*; 7:00 pm, BTN		Valparaiso	W 84–50	7–4	18 – Law	10 – Skelly	5 – McIntosh	Allstate Arena (5,299); Rosemont, IL
Dec 16, 2017*; 1:00 pm, FS1		at DePaul	W 62–60	8–4	25 – Lindsey	8 – Lindsey	7 – McIntosh	Wintrust Arena (7,001); Chicago, IL
Dec 19, 2017*; 7:00 pm, BTN+		Lewis	W 85–48	9–4	24 – McIntosh	6 – Gaines	7 – McIntosh	Allstate Arena (5,126); Rosemont, IL
Dec 22, 2017*; 6:00 pm, ESPN2		at No. 17 Oklahoma	L 78–104	9–5	17 – Pardon	9 – Pardon	3 – Tied	Lloyd Noble Center (11,259); Norman, OK
Dec 30, 2017*; 11:00 am, FS1		Brown	W 95–73	10–5	18 – Pardon	8 – Pardon	3 – 4 tied	Allstate Arena (6,006); Rosemont, IL
Jan 2, 2018; 8:00 pm, BTN		Nebraska	L 55–70	10–6 (1–2)	17 – Pardon	15 – Pardon	4 – Lindsey	Allstate Arena (5,443); Rosemont, IL
Jan 5, 2018; 7:00 pm, FS1		at Penn State	L 63–78	10–7 (1–3)	18 – McIntosh	6 – Law	5 – Law	Bryce Jordan Center (4,682); University Park, PA
Jan 10, 2018; 8:00 pm, BTN		Minnesota	W 83–60	11–7 (2–3)	22 – Lindsey	12 – Pardon	16 – McIntosh	Allstate Arena (5,514); Rosemont, IL
Jan 14, 2018; 3:30 pm, CBS		at Indiana	L 46–66	11–8 (2–4)	9 – Tied	7 – Law	3 – Law	Simon Skjodt Assembly Hall (17,222); Bloomington, IN
Jan 17, 2018; 8:00 pm, BTN		No. 22 Ohio State	L 65–71	11–9 (2–5)	13 – Lindsey	10 – Pardon	4 – Pardon	Allstate Arena (6,018); Rosemont, IL
Jan 20, 2018; 1:00 pm, BTN		Penn State	W 70–61	12–9 (3–5)	18 – Law	5 – Tied	4 – McIntosh	Allstate Arena (6,544); Rosemont, IL
Jan 23, 2018; 8:00 pm, BTN		at Minnesota	W 77–69	13–9 (4–5)	18 – Tied	13 – Law	5 – Law	Williams Arena (14,625); Minneapolis, MN
Jan 29, 2018; 6:00 pm, FS1		at No. 24 Michigan	L 47–58	13–10 (4–6)	15 – Lindsey	7 – Tied	5 – McIntosh	Crisler Center (10,879); Ann Arbor, MI
Feb 1, 2018; 7:30 pm, FS1		at Wisconsin	W 60–52	14–10 (5–6)	17 – Pardon	8 – Law	4 – McIntosh	Kohl Center (17,287); Madison, WI
Feb 6, 2018; 6:00 pm, BTN		No. 20 Michigan	W 61–52	15–10 (6–6)	24 – McIntosh	9 – Skelly	5 – McIntosh	Allstate Arena (7,457); Rosemont, IL
Feb 10, 2018; 11:00 am, ESPN2		at Maryland	L 57–73	15–11 (6–7)	20 – Lindsey	8 – Pardon	3 – 2 tied	Xfinity Center (16,164); College Park, MD
Feb 13, 2018; 8:00 pm, BTN		at Rutgers	L 58–67 ^{OT}	15–12 (6–8)	19 – Lindsey	13 – Pardon	5 – McIntosh	Louis Brown Athletic Center (3,827); Piscataway, NJ
Feb 17, 2018; 1:00 pm, FOX		No. 2 Michigan State	L 60–65	15–13 (6–9)	21 – Law	6 – Pardon	5 – Law	Allstate Arena (12,114); Rosemont, IL
Feb 19, 2018; 6:00 pm, FS1		Maryland	L 64–71	15–14 (6–10)	15 – Lindsey	6 – Pardon	5 – Gaines	Allstate Arena (6,014); Rosemont, IL
Feb 22, 2018; 6:00 pm, ESPN2		Wisconsin	L 64–70	15–15 (6–11)	26 – Lindsey	9 – Pardon	6 – McIntosh	Allstate Arena (7,033); Rosemont, IL
Feb 25, 2018; 6:30 pm, BTN		at Iowa	L 70–77	15–16 (6–12)	32 – Lindsey	10 – Benson	6 – Gaines	Carver–Hawkeye Arena; Iowa City, IA
Big Ten tournament
Mar 1, 2018; 5:30 pm, BTN	(10)	vs. (7) Penn State; Second round	L 57–65	15–17	14 – Pardon	8 – tied	5 – McIntosh	Madison Square Garden (13,996); New York City, NY
*Non-conference game. ^{#}Rankings from AP Poll. (#) Tournament seedings in parentheses. All times are in Eastern Time.

== Rankings ==
Ranking movements Legend: ██ Increase in ranking ██ Decrease in ranking — = Not ranked RV = Received votes
	Week																			
Poll	Pre	1	2	3	4	5	6	7	8	9	10	11	12	13	14	15	16	17	18	Final
AP	19	20	RV	RV	RV	—														Not released
Coaches	20	RV	—																	

*AP does not release post-NCAA tournament rankings

== See also ==
2017–18 Northwestern Wildcats women's basketball team
