= Vincent Edwards (basketball) =

American basketball player (born 1996)

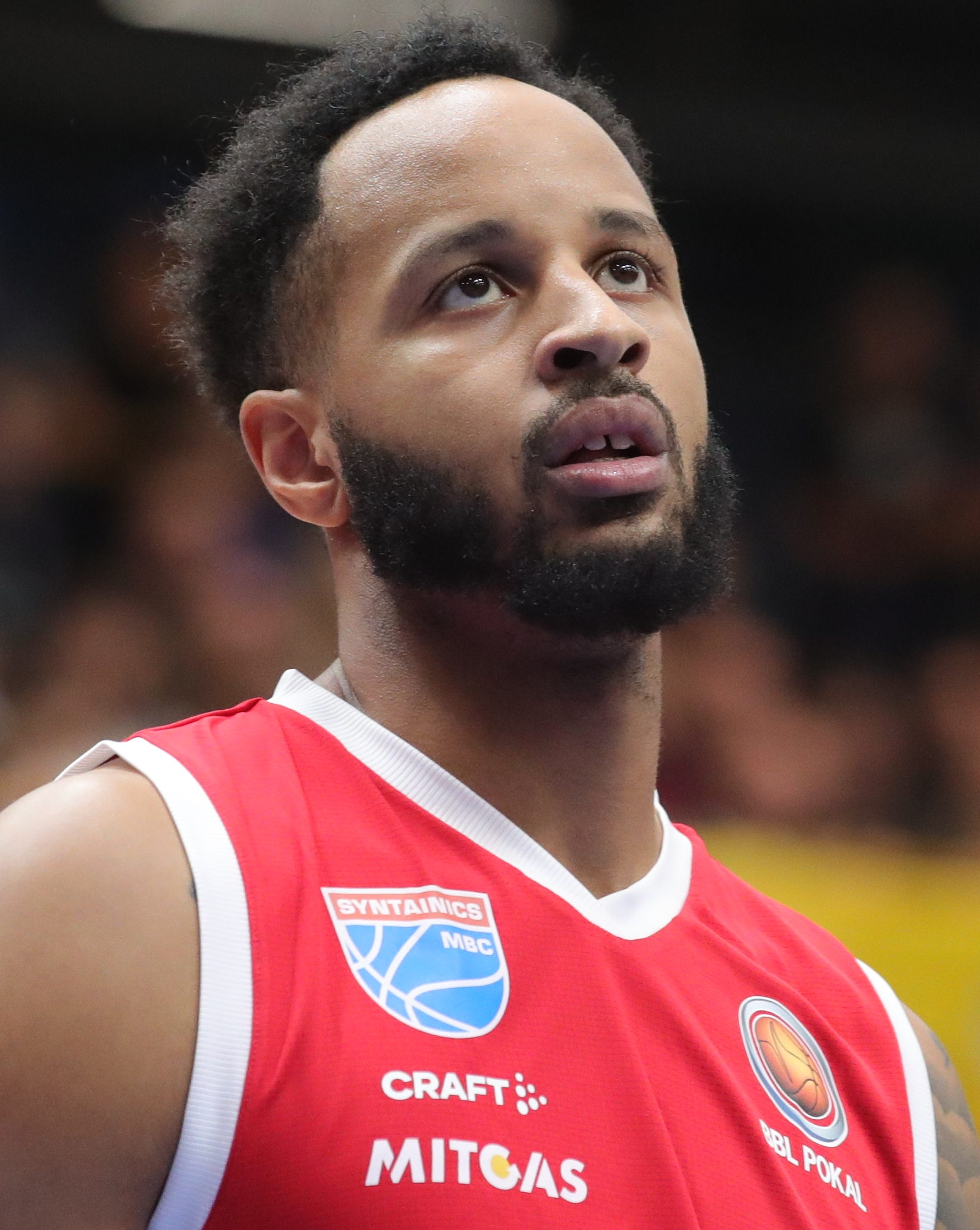
- Edwards playing for Mitteldeutscher BC (2023)

Free agent
- Position: Small forward / power forward

Personal information
- Born: April 5, 1996 (age 30) Middletown, Ohio, U.S.
- Listed height: 6 ft 8 in (2.03 m)
- Listed weight: 225 lb (102 kg)

Career information
- High school: Middletown (Middletown, Ohio)
- College: Purdue (2014–2018)
- NBA draft: 2018: 2nd round, 52nd overall pick
- Drafted by: Utah Jazz
- Playing career: 2018–present

Career history
- 2018–2019: Houston Rockets
- 2018–2019: →Rio Grande Valley Vipers
- 2019–2020: Oklahoma City Blue
- 2020: Canton Charge
- 2021: Oklahoma City Blue
- 2021–2022: Iowa Wolves
- 2022–2023: BCM Gravelines-Dunkerque
- 2023: Ironi Ness Ziona
- 2023–2024: Mitteldeutscher BC
- 2024: Seoul Samsung Thunders
- 2026: Pioneros de Los Mochis

Career highlights
- NBA G League champion (2019); Second-team All-Big Ten (2018); Third-team All-Big Ten (2017)
- Stats at NBA.com
- Stats at Basketball Reference
Medals
Men's basketball
Representing United States
Summer Universiade
Silver medal – second place	2017 Taipei	Team competition

Vincent Malik Edwards (born April 5, 1996) is an American professional basketball player for the Pioneros de Los Mochis of the CIBACOPA. He played college basketball for the Purdue Boilermakers, and was drafted in the second round of the 2018 NBA draft.

== College career ==
Edwards committed to Purdue from Middletown High School in Middletown, Ohio, choosing the Boilermakers over Michigan. The versatile small forward started beginning in his freshman season, earning Big Ten Conference freshman of the week honors three times. As a sophomore, Edwards averaged 11.3 points and 5.4 rebounds per game and toyed with the NBA draft before deciding to return to Purdue.

In his junior season, he averaged 12.6 points, 4.9 rebounds and 3.6 assists per game and was named third-team All-Big Ten. He scored a career-high 26 points in a 69–64 win over Indiana on February 9, 2017. While Edwards was a key player for Purdue during the season, he tended to raise his level of play in the NCAA tournament for the Boilermakers.

Following his junior season, Edwards declared for the 2017 NBA draft without hiring an agent. He ultimately decided to return to Purdue for his senior year. As a senior, Edwards averaged 14.6 points, 7.4 rebounds and 2.9 assists per game, shooting 47.6 percent from the floor and 39.8 percent from three-point range. He was a second-team All-Big Ten selection. He finished his Purdue career with 1,638 points, 779 rebounds and 403 assists and started the second-most games for a Boilermaker with 125.

== Professional career ==
=== Houston Rockets (2018–2019) ===
On June 21, 2018, Edwards was selected by the Utah Jazz with the 52nd pick in the 2018 NBA draft. He was subsequently traded to the Houston Rockets. On July 5, 2018, the Rockets announced that they had signed Edwards via their Twitter account. Edwards mainly competed for their G League affiliate, the Rio Grande Valley Vipers, averaging 9.7 points and 5.3 rebounds per game on a team that won the G League championship.

=== Oklahoma City Blue (2019–2020) ===
Edwards joined the Oklahoma City Blue in October 2019. On February 11, 2020, Edwards posted 35 points, 11 rebounds, two assists, two steals and two blocks in a 137–118 win over the Long Island Nets. He averaged 11.0 points and 5.3 rebounds per game in 29 games.

=== Canton Charge (2020) ===
On February 16, 2020, the Canton Charge announced that they had acquired Edwards from the Oklahoma City Blue in exchange for Tyler Cook. He averaged 3.4 points, 2.4 rebounds, and 1 assist per game for Canton.

=== Return to the Blue (2021) ===
On December 17, 2020, Edwards signed with the Sacramento Kings, but was waived two days later and signed back with the Blue on January 28, 2021.

=== Iowa Wolves (2021–2022) ===
On October 15, 2021, Edwards signed with the Minnesota Timberwolves only to be waived the next day. On October 26, he signed with the Iowa Wolves.

=== Titanes del Distrito Nacional (2022) ===
Edwards signed with the Titanes del Distrito Nacional in the Dominican National Basketball League (LNB) for the 2022 season.

=== BCM Gravelines (2022–2023) ===
On July 9, 2022, he signed with BCM Gravelines-Dunkerque of the LNB Pro A.

=== Ironi Ness Ziona (2023) ===
On August 9, 2023, he signed with Ironi Ness Ziona of the Israeli Basketball Premier League.

=== Mitteldeutscher BC (2023–2024) ===
On November 12, 2023, he signed with Mitteldeutscher BC of the Basketball Bundesliga.

=== Seoul Samsung Thunders (2024) ===
On December 11, 2024, Edwards signed with Seoul Samsung Thunders of the Korean Basketball League to replace Kofi Cockburn until December 29.

== International career ==
Edwards was a part of the Purdue team chosen to represent the United States in the 2017 Summer Universiade in Taipei, ROC. and they captured a silver medal.

== Career statistics ==
Legend
GP	Games played	GS	Games started	MPG	Minutes per game
FG%	Field goal percentage	3P%	3-point field goal percentage	FT%	Free throw percentage
RPG	Rebounds per game	APG	Assists per game	SPG	Steals per game
BPG	Blocks per game	PPG	Points per game	**Bold**	Career high

=== College ===
Year	Team	GP	GS	MPG	FG%	3P%	FT%	RPG	APG	SPG	BPG	PPG
2014–15	Purdue	33	30	26.9	.482	.326	.788	4.8	2.7	.4	.4	8.8
2015–16	Purdue	**35**	**35**	27.5	.450	.407	.820	5.4	2.9	.5	.3	11.3
2016–17	Purdue	**35**	27	28.6	**.486**	**.423**	.820	4.9	**3.2**	**.6**	.5	12.6
2017–18	Purdue	**35**	**35**	**31.6**	.476	.398	**.833**	**7.4**	2.9	.5	**.6**	**14.6**
Career		138	127	28.7	.473	.392	.820	5.6	2.9	.5	.5	11.9

== Personal life ==
Edwards is the son of former Wright State star and NBA player Bill Edwards.

== See also ==
- List of second-generation NBA players
