= 2017–18 Minnesota Golden Gophers men's basketball team =

American college basketball season

2017–18 Minnesota Golden Gophers men's basketball
- Conference: Big Ten Conference
- Record: 15–17 (4–14 Big Ten)
- Head coach: Richard Pitino (5th season)
- Assistant coaches: Ed Conroy (2nd season); Ben Johnson (5th season); Kimani Young (5th season)
- Home arena: Williams Arena

2017–18 Big Ten Conference men's basketball standings
| | Conf. | | | | Overall |
| Team | W | | L | PCT | W | | L | PCT |
|---|---|---|---|---|---|---|---|---|
| No. 5 Michigan State | 16 | – | 2 | .889 | 30 | – | 5 | .857 |
| No. 11 Purdue | 15 | – | 3 | .833 | 30 | – | 7 | .811 |
| No. 17 Ohio State | 15 | – | 3 | .833 | 25 | – | 9 | .735 |
| No. 7 Michigan † | 13 | – | 5 | .722 | 33 | – | 8 | .805 |
| Nebraska | 13 | – | 5 | .722 | 22 | – | 11 | .667 |
| Penn State | 9 | – | 9 | .500 | 26 | – | 13 | .667 |
| Indiana | 9 | – | 9 | .500 | 16 | – | 15 | .516 |
| Maryland | 8 | – | 10 | .444 | 19 | – | 13 | .594 |
| Wisconsin | 7 | – | 11 | .389 | 15 | – | 18 | .455 |
| Northwestern | 6 | – | 12 | .333 | 15 | – | 17 | .469 |
| Minnesota | 4 | – | 14 | .222 | 15 | – | 17 | .469 |
| Illinois | 4 | – | 14 | .222 | 14 | – | 18 | .438 |
| Iowa | 4 | – | 14 | .222 | 14 | – | 19 | .424 |
| Rutgers | 3 | – | 15 | .167 | 15 | – | 19 | .441 |
† 2018 Big Ten tournament winner Rankings from AP poll

The 2017–18 Minnesota Golden Gophers men's basketball team represented the University of Minnesota in the 2017–18 NCAA Division I men's basketball season. The Gophers were led by fifth-year head coach Richard Pitino and played their home games at Williams Arena in Minneapolis, Minnesota as members of the Big Ten Conference. They finished the season 15–17, 4–14 in Big Ten play to finish in a three-way tie for 11th place. As the No. 11 seed in the Big Ten tournament, they lost in the first round to Rutgers.

== Previous season ==
The Golden Gophers finished the 2016–17 season 24–10, 11–7 in Big Ten play to finish in fourth place. In the Big Ten tournament, they beat Michigan State in the quarterfinals before losing to Michigan in the semifinals. They received an at-large bid to the NCAA tournament as a No. 5 seed. The bid marked their first trip to the Tournament since 2013. In the first round, they were upset by No. 12-seeded Middle Tennessee.

Head coach Richard Pitino was named Big Ten Coach of the Year. Reggie Lynch was named defensive player of the year. Nate Mason was named to the All-Big Ten First Team.

== Offseason ==
=== Departures ===
| Name | Number | Pos. | Height | Weight | Year | Hometown | Notes |
|---|---|---|---|---|---|---|---|
| Akeem Springs | 0 | G | 6'4" | 210 | RS Senior | Waukegan, IL | Graduated |
| Darin Haugh | 10 | G | 5'10" | 170 | RS Senior | Prior Lake, MN | Graduated, walk-on |
| Stephon Sharp | 15 | G | 6'3" | 195 | Sophomore | Bloomington, MN | Retired from basketball, walk-on |
| Ahmad Gilbert | 32 | F | 6'6" | 210 | Sophomore | Philadelphia, PA | Transferred to Rider |

=== Incoming transfers ===
| Name | Number | Pos. | Height | Weight | Year | Hometown | Previous School |
|---|---|---|---|---|---|---|---|
| Matz Stockman | 35 | C | 7'0" | 240 | Senior | Oslo, Norway | Transferred from Louisville. Under NCAA transfer rules, Stockman will have to sit out for the 2017–18 season. Will have one year of remaining eligibility. |

=== Recruiting classes ===
==== 2017 recruiting class ====
College recruiting information
| Name | Hometown | School | Height | Weight | Commit date |
|---|---|---|---|---|---|
| Isaiah Washington; PG | Bronx, NY | St. Raymond School For Boys | 6 ft 0 in (1.83 m) | 162 lb (73 kg) | Sep 11, 2016 |
| Isaiah Washington; PG | Recruit ratings: Scout: Rivals: 247Sports: ESPN: | | | | |
| Jamir Harris; CG | Elizabeth, NJ | The Patrick School | 6 ft 2 in (1.88 m) | 185 lb (84 kg) | Sep 21, 2016 |
| Jamir Harris; CG | Recruit ratings: Scout: Rivals: 247Sports: ESPN: | | | | |
Overall recruit ranking:
Note: In many cases, Scout, Rivals, 247Sports, On3, and ESPN may conflict in their listings of height and weight.; In these cases, the average was taken. ESPN grades are on a 100-point scale.; Sources: "2017 Minnesota Commits". Rivals.; "2017 Team Ranking". Rivals.

==== 2018 recruiting class ====
College recruiting information (2018)
| Name | Hometown | School | Height | Weight | Commit date |
|---|---|---|---|---|---|
| Daniel Oturu; C | St. Paul, MN | Cretin-Derham Hall | 6 ft 10 in (2.08 m) | 216 lb (98 kg) | Jan 19, 2017 |
| Daniel Oturu; C | Recruit ratings: Scout: Rivals: 247Sports: ESPN: | | | | |
| Gabe Kalscheur; SG | Minneapolis, MN | DeLaSalle High School | 6 ft 3 in (1.91 m) | 182 lb (83 kg) | Jul 25, 2017 |
| Gabe Kalscheur; SG | Recruit ratings: Scout: Rivals: 247Sports: ESPN: | | | | |
| Jarvis Thomas; PF | Orono, MN | Orono High School | 6 ft 8 in (2.03 m) | 210 lb (95 kg) | Jul 18, 2017 |
| Jarvis Thomas; PF | Recruit ratings: Scout: Rivals: 247Sports: | | | | |
Overall recruit ranking:
Note: In many cases, Scout, Rivals, 247Sports, On3, and ESPN may conflict in their listings of height and weight.; In these cases, the average was taken. ESPN grades are on a 100-point scale.; Sources: "2018 Minnesota Commits". Rivals.; "2018 Team Ranking". Rivals.

== Preseason ==
In its annual preseason preview, the Blue Ribbon Yearbook ranked Minnesota No. 18 in the country.

== Roster ==
2017–18 Minnesota Golden Gophers men's basketball team
Players
Coaches

| Pos. | # | Name | Height | Weight | Year | Previous school | Hometown |
|---|---|---|---|---|---|---|---|
| G | 5 | Amir Coffey | 6 ft 8 in (2.03 m) | 205 lb (93 kg) | So | Hopkins | Hopkins, MN |
| G | 13 | Hunt Conroy (W) | 5 ft 10 in (1.78 m) | 165 lb (75 kg) | Fr | Jesuit | New Orleans, LA |
| F | 24 | Eric Curry (injured) (redshirt) | 6 ft 9 in (2.06 m) | 235 lb (107 kg) | So | Southwest Christian Academy | Memphis, TN |
| F | 41 | Gaston Diedhiou | 6 ft 10 in (2.08 m) | 245 lb (111 kg) | Sr | Canarias Academy | Dakar, Senegal |
| F | 20 | Davonte Fitzgerald | 6 ft 8 in (2.03 m) | 220 lb (100 kg) | RS Sr | Tucker; Texas A&M | Atlanta, GA |
| G | 4 | Jamir Harris | 6 ft 2 in (1.88 m) | 190 lb (86 kg) | Fr | The Patrick School | North Brunswick, NJ |
| F | 42 | Michael Hurt | 6 ft 7 in (2.01 m) | 220 lb (100 kg) | So | John Marshall | Rochester, MN |
| C | 21 | Bakary Konaté | 6 ft 11 in (2.11 m) | 240 lb (109 kg) | Sr | Sunrise Christian Academy | Bamako, Mali |
| C | 22 | Reggie Lynch (S) | 6 ft 10 in (2.08 m) | 265 lb (120 kg) | RS Sr | Edina; Illinois State | Edina, MN |
| G | 2 | Nate Mason (C) | 6 ft 2 in (1.88 m) | 190 lb (86 kg) | Sr | Arlington Country Day | Decatur, GA |
| G | 1 | Dupree McBrayer | 6 ft 5 in (1.96 m) | 195 lb (88 kg) | Jr | Sunrise Christian Academy | Queens, NY |
| F | 3 | Jordan Murphy (C) | 6 ft 6 in (1.98 m) | 250 lb (113 kg) | Jr | Brennan | San Antonio, TX |
| G | 10 | Brady Rudrud (W) | 6 ft 2 in (1.88 m) | 190 lb (86 kg) | So | Eden Prairie | Eden Prairie, MN |
| C | 35 | Matz Stockman (I) (redshirt) | 7 ft 0 in (2.13 m) | 240 lb (109 kg) | Sr | Canarias Academy; Louisville | Oslo, Norway |
| G | 11 | Isaiah Washington | 6 ft 1 in (1.85 m) | 190 lb (86 kg) | Fr | St. Raymond | Harlem, NY |

Head coach

- Richard Pitino (Providence)

Assistant coach(es)

- Ed Conroy (The Citadel)
- Ben Johnson (Minnesota)
- Kimani Young (UTEP)

Legend

- (C) Team captain
- (S) Suspended
- (I) Ineligible
- (W) Walk-on
- Injured
- Current redshirt

Roster

== Regular season ==
=== Alabama game - playing five on three ===
One of their most notable games of the season came on November 25, 2017 against No. 25 Alabama. During that game, Alabama's bench players left the bench to scuffle with Minnesota players midway through the second half. Because the players left the bench, every one of the players was ejected leaving Alabama with only five eligible players. Not long after the scuffle, Alabama's Dazon Ingram fouled out with 11:37 left in the game, which left Alabama with only four players. Shortly thereafter, Alabama's John Petty turned his ankle and was unable return for the rest of the game, leaving Alabama with only three players with 10:41 left in the match. While Minnesota was up by as many as 15 points under three-on-five competition, their lead diminished to as little as three points at one point due, in part, to Collin Sexton's 40-point game. However, the Golden Gophers would ultimately win 89–84 over the short-handed Crimson Tide. The game would be considered one of the strangest games in college basketball history.

=== Reggie Lynch suspension ===
On January 5, 2018, Reggie Lynch was suspended from the University of Minnesota due to multiple sexual assault allegations that had occurred in 2016. The school's Equal Opportunity and Affirmative Action Office suspended Lynch from the University until 2020. Lynch appealed the finding and cannot play in any games, but was allowed to practice with the team.

== Schedule and results ==
The 2018 Big Ten tournament will be held at Madison Square Garden in New York City. Due to the Big East's use of that venue for their conference tournament, the Big Ten tournament will take place one week earlier than usual, ending the week before Selection Sunday. The Gophers were initially slated to hold only one public exhibition game against Concordia-St. Paul, in addition to a closed scrimmage against Creighton. However, in response to the devastation from hurricanes Harvey, Irma, and Maria, the NCAA announced that it would allow Division I basketball teams to apply for a waiver to play a third exhibition game if the proceeds were donated to charity. The Gophers took advantage of the opportunity, scheduling an additional exhibition game against Wisconsin-Green Bay. The game was scheduled to be played at Maturi Pavilion, with all proceeds being donated to the American Red Cross hurricane relief efforts in Puerto Rico.

| Date time, TV | Rank^{#} | Opponent^{#} | Result | Record | High points | High rebounds | High assists | Site (attendance) city, state |
Exhibition
| Nov 2, 2017*; 7:00 pm, BTN Plus | No. 15 | Concordia-St. Paul | W 106–58 | | 22 – Murphy | 11 – Murphy | 6 – Coffey | Williams Arena (9,838); Minneapolis, MN |
| Nov 5, 2017*; 12:00 pm, BTN Plus | No. 15 | Green Bay; ARC hurricane relief benefit | W 115–86 | | 26 – Coffey | 11 – Murphy | 6 – Washington | Maturi Pavilion (2,381); Minneapolis, MN |
Regular season
| Nov 10, 2017*; 7:00 pm, BTN Plus | No. 15 | USC Upstate | W 92–77 | 1–0 | 35 – Murphy | 15 – Murphy | 5 – Washington | Williams Arena (10,836); Minneapolis, MN |
| Nov 13, 2017*; 5:30 pm, FS1 | No. 14 | at Providence; Gavitt Tipoff Games | W 86–74 | 2–0 | 23 – Murphy | 14 – Murphy | 2 – Tied | Dunkin' Donuts Center (10,214); Providence, RI |
| Nov 15, 2017*; 7:00 pm, BTN Plus | No. 14 | Niagara | W 107–81 | 3–0 | 18 – Tied | 12 – Lynch | 11 – Mason | Williams Arena (10,093); Minneapolis, MN |
| Nov 19, 2017*; 3:30 pm, FS1 | No. 14 | Western Carolina; Barclays Center Classic | W 92–64 | 4–0 | 23 – Murphy | 11 – Murphy | 4 – Tied | Williams Arena (11,107); Minneapolis, MN |
| Nov 21, 2017*; 7:00 pm, BTN | No. 14 | Alabama A&M; Barclays Center Classic | W 100–57 | 5–0 | 20 – Murphy | 10 – Murphy | 8 – Tied | Williams Arena (10,704); Minneapolis, MN |
| Nov 24, 2017*; 11:00 am, Stadium | No. 14 | vs. Massachusetts; Barclays Center Classic | W 69–51 | 6–0 | 16 – Murphy | 11 – Murphy | 6 – Mason | Steinberg Wellness Center (1,350); Brooklyn, NY |
| Nov 25, 2017*; 4:00 pm, Stadium | No. 14 | vs. No. 25 Alabama; Barclays Center Classic | W 89–84 | 7–0 | 20 – Mason | 14 – Murphy | 8 – McBrayer | Barclays Center (3,469); Brooklyn, NY |
| Nov 29, 2017*; 8:00 pm, ESPN2 | No. 12 | No. 10 Miami (FL); ACC–Big Ten Challenge | L 81–86 | 7–1 | 23 – Coffey | 14 – Murphy | 5 – Mason | Williams Arena (14,625); Minneapolis, MN |
| Dec 3, 2017; 5:00 pm, BTN | No. 12 | Rutgers | W 89–67 | 8–1 (1–0) | 26 – Mason | 16 – Murphy | 7 – Tied | Williams Arena (11,097); Minneapolis, MN |
| Dec 5, 2017; 8:00 pm, BTN | No. 14 | at Nebraska | L 68–78 | 8–2 (1–1) | 20 – Mason | 12 – Murphy | 3 – Mason | Pinnacle Bank Arena (13,847); Lincoln, NE |
| Dec 9, 2017*; 4:45 pm, SECN | No. 14 | at Arkansas | L 79–95 | 8–3 | 20 – Murphy | 10 – Murphy | 6 – Mason | Bud Walton Arena (17,583); Fayetteville, AR |
| Dec 11, 2017*; 7:00 pm, BTN | | Drake | W 68–67 | 9–3 | 24 – Murphy | 18 – Murphy | 5 – Mason | Williams Arena (11,319); Minneapolis, MN |
| Dec 21, 2017*; 7:00 pm, BTN Plus | | Oral Roberts | W 77–63 | 10–3 | 17 – Murphy | 10 – Murphy | 7 – Coffey | Williams Arena (11,234); Minneapolis, MN |
| Dec 23, 2017*; 2:30 pm, BTN | | Florida Atlantic | W 95–60 | 11–3 | 17 – Mason | 11 – Murphy | 8 – Coffey | Williams Arena (12,357); Minneapolis, MN |
| Dec 30, 2017*; 1:00 pm, BTN | | Harvard | W 65–55 | 12–3 | 15 – McBrayer | 13 – Washington | 5 – Coffey | Williams Arena (14,625); Minneapolis, MN |
| Jan 3, 2018; 8:00 pm, BTN | | Illinois | W 77–67 | 13–3 (2–1) | 17 – Tied | 17 – Murphy | 6 – Mason | Williams Arena (11,597); Minneapolis, MN |
| Jan 6, 2018; 4:15 pm, ESPN2 | | Indiana | L 71–75 | 13–4 (2–2) | 22 – Mason | 10 – Murphy | 9 – Mason | Williams Arena (12,956); Minneapolis, MN |
| Jan 10, 2018; 8:00 pm, BTN | | at Northwestern | L 60–83 | 13–5 (2–3) | 14 – McBrayer | 5 – Washington | 5 – Tied | Allstate Arena (5,514); Rosemont, IL |
| Jan 13, 2018; 11:00 am, ESPN2 | | No. 5 Purdue | L 47–81 | 13–6 (2–4) | 11 – Washington | 7 – Konate | 3 – Tied | Williams Arena (12,459); Minneapolis, MN |
| Jan 15, 2018; 6:00 pm, BTN | | at Penn State | W 95–84 ^{OT} | 14–6 (3–4) | 25 – Mason | 19 – Murphy | 3 – Mason | Bryce Jordan Center (6,361); University Park, PA |
| Jan 18, 2018; 7:30 pm, FS1 | | at Maryland | L 66–77 | 14–7 (3–5) | 19 – Murphy | 14 – Murphy | 5 – Tied | Xfinity Center (13,736); College Park, MD |
| Jan 20, 2018; 11:00 am, BTN | | vs. No. 22 Ohio State; B1G Super Saturday | L 49–67 | 14–8 (3–6) | 13 – Murphy | 9 – Mason | 2 – 3 tied | Madison Square Garden (4,136); New York City, NY |
| Jan 23, 2018; 8:00 pm, BTN | | Northwestern | L 69–77 | 14–9 (3–7) | 25 – Mason | 9 – Murphy | 9 – Mason | Williams Arena (14,625); Minneapolis, MN |
| Jan 30, 2018; 8:00 pm, BTN | | at Iowa | L 80–94 | 14–10 (3–8) | 21 – Murphy | 17 – Murphy | 7 – Washington | Carver–Hawkeye Arena (10,371); Iowa City, IA |
| Feb 3, 2018; 1:30 pm, FOX | | at No. 24 Michigan | L 73–76 ^{OT} | 14–11 (3–9) | 26 – Washington | 9 – Fitzgerald | 3 – Washington | Crisler Center (12,707); Ann Arbor, MI |
| Feb 6, 2018; 8:00 pm, BTN | | Nebraska | L 85–91 | 14–12 (3–10) | 34 – Mason | 12 – Murphy | 8 – Washington | Williams Arena (11,193); Minneapolis, MN |
| Feb 9, 2018; 6:30 pm, FS1 | | at Indiana | L 56–80 | 14–13 (3–11) | 18 – Mason | 9 – Murphy | 2 – Murphy | Simon Skjodt Assembly Hall (17,222); Bloomington, IN |
| Feb 13, 2018; 8:00 pm, ESPN2 | | No. 2 Michigan State | L 57–87 | 14–14 (3–12) | 18 – Washington | 7 – Murphy | 4 – Mason | Williams Arena (12,218); Minneapolis, MN |
| Feb 19, 2018; 8:00 pm, FS1 | | at Wisconsin | L 63–73 ^{OT} | 14–15 (3–13) | 16 – Murphy | 11 – Murphy | 5 – Mason | Kohl Center (17,287); Madison, WI |
| Feb 21, 2018; 8:00 pm, BTN | | Iowa | W 86–82 | 15–15 (4–13) | 33 – Mason | 10 – Tied | 6 – Mason | Williams Arena (11,732); Minneapolis, MN |
| Feb 25, 2018; 3:00 pm, FS1 | | at No. 9 Purdue | L 60–84 | 15–16 (4–14) | 18 – Mason | 10 – Murphy | 3 – Mason | Mackey Arena (14,804); West Lafayette, IN |
Big Ten tournament
| Feb 28, 2018; 7:00 pm, BTN | (11) | vs. (14) Rutgers; First round | L 54–65 | 15–17 | 18 – Washington | 9 – Murphy | 7 – Mason | Madison Square Garden (14,681); New York City, NY |
*Non-conference game. ^{#}Rankings from AP Poll. (#) Tournament seedings in parentheses. All times are in Central Time.

== Rankings ==
Ranking movements Legend: ██ Increase in ranking ██ Decrease in ranking RV = Received votes
| | Week | | | | | | | | | | | | | | | | | | | |
| Poll | Pre | 1 | 2 | 3 | 4 | 5 | 6 | 7 | 8 | 9 | 10 | 11 | 12 | 13 | 14 | 15 | 16 | 17 | 18 | Final |
|---|---|---|---|---|---|---|---|---|---|---|---|---|---|---|---|---|---|---|---|---|
| AP | 15 | 14 | 14 | 12 | 14 | RV | | | | | | | | | | | | | | Not released |
| Coaches | 15 | | 15 | 12 | 15 | RV | | | | | | | | | | | | | | |

*AP does not release post-NCAA tournament rankings

== Awards and honors ==
=== In-season awards ===
==== Jordan Murphy ====
- Big Ten Player of the Week, November 13, 2017
- Big Ten Player of the Week, November 20, 2017
- Big Ten Player of the Week, November 27, 2017

==== Isaiah Washington ====
- Big Ten Freshman of the Week, February 5, 2018

=== Postseason awards ===
==== Nate Mason ====
- All-Big Ten Honorable Mention

==== Jordan Murphy ====
- All-Big Ten Second Team (media)
- All-Big Ten Third Team (coaches)
