= 2017–18 Maryland Terrapins men's basketball team =

American college basketball season

2017–18 Maryland Terrapins men's basketball
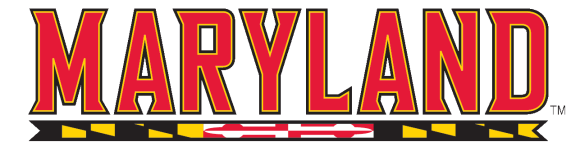
- Conference: Big Ten Conference
- Record: 19–13 (8–10 Big Ten)
- Head coach: Mark Turgeon (7th season)
- Assistant coaches: Kevin Broadus; Dustin Clark; Bino Ranson
- Home arena: Xfinity Center

2017–18 Big Ten Conference men's basketball standings
	Conf.				Overall
Team	W		L	PCT	W		L	PCT
No. 5 Michigan State	16	–	2	.889	30	–	5	.857
No. 11 Purdue	15	–	3	.833	30	–	7	.811
No. 17 Ohio State	15	–	3	.833	25	–	9	.735
No. 7 Michigan †	13	–	5	.722	33	–	8	.805
Nebraska	13	–	5	.722	22	–	11	.667
Penn State	9	–	9	.500	26	–	13	.667
Indiana	9	–	9	.500	16	–	15	.516
Maryland	8	–	10	.444	19	–	13	.594
Wisconsin	7	–	11	.389	15	–	18	.455
Northwestern	6	–	12	.333	15	–	17	.469
Minnesota	4	–	14	.222	15	–	17	.469
Illinois	4	–	14	.222	14	–	18	.438
Iowa	4	–	14	.222	14	–	19	.424
Rutgers	3	–	15	.167	15	–	19	.441
† 2018 Big Ten tournament winner Rankings from AP poll

The 2017–18 Maryland Terrapins men's basketball team represented the University of Maryland, College Park in the 2017–18 NCAA Division I men's basketball season. They were led by seventh-year head coach Mark Turgeon and played their home games at Xfinity Center in College Park, Maryland, as members of the Big Ten Conference. They finished the season 19–13, 8–10 in Big Ten play to finish in eighth place. They lost in the second round of the Big Ten tournament to Wisconsin. They were invited to the College Basketball Invitational, but declined, marking their absence in a postseason tournament for the first time since 2014.

== Previous season ==
The Terrapins finished the 2016–17 season 24–9, 12–6 in Big Ten play to finish in a tie for second place. As the No. 3 seed in the Big Ten tournament, they lost to Northwestern in the quarterfinals. They received an at-large bid to the NCAA tournament. As a No. 6 seed in the West region, they lost in the first round to Xavier.

== Offseason ==
=== Departures ===
Melo Trimble declared for the NBA draft on March 29, 2017 and signed with an agent. He was not picked in the NBA draft.

Name	Number	Pos.	Height	Weight	Year	Hometown	Notes
Jaylen Brantley	1	G	5'11"	170	Junior	Springfield, MA	Graduate transferred to Massachusetts
Melo Trimble	2	G	6'2"	185	Junior	Washington, D.C.	Declare for 2017 NBA draft/undrafted
L. G. Gill	10	F	6'8"	230	Senior	Chesterfield, VA	Graduated
Micah Thomas	23	F	6'7"	195	Freshman	Memphis, TN	Transferred to Tyler JC
Kent Auslander	32	G	6'6"	200	Sophomore	Herndon, VA	Walk-on; didn't return
Damonte Dodd	35	F	6'11"	250	Senior	Centreville, MD	Graduated

=== Incoming transfers ===
Name	Number	Pos.	Height	Weight	Year	Hometown	Previous School
Sean Obi	0	F	6'9"	255	RS Senior	Kaduna, Nigeria	Graduate transfer from Duke; immediately eligible.

=== 2017 recruiting class ===
College recruiting
Name	Hometown	School	Height	Weight	Commit date
Bruno Fernando; C	Montverde, FL	IMG Academy	6 ft 10 in (2.08 m)	225 lb (102 kg)	Oct 2, 2016
Bruno Fernando; C	Recruit ratings: Scout: Rivals: 247Sports: ESPN:				
Darryl Morsell; SG	Baltimore, MD	Mount Saint Joseph High School	6 ft 4 in (1.93 m)	200 lb (91 kg)	Nov 2, 2016
Darryl Morsell; SG	Recruit ratings: Scout: Rivals: 247Sports: ESPN:				
Overall recruit ranking:
Note: In many cases, Scout, Rivals, 247Sports, On3, and ESPN may conflict in their listings of height and weight.; In these cases, the average was taken. ESPN grades are on a 100-point scale.; Sources: "2017 Maryland Commits". Rivals.; "2017 Team Ranking". Rivals.

=== 2018 Recruiting class ===
College recruiting (2018)
Name	Hometown	School	Height	Weight	Commit date
Aaron Wiggins; SF	High Point, NC	Wesleyan Christian Academy	6 ft 6 in (1.98 m)	180 lb (82 kg)	Jun 3, 2017
Aaron Wiggins; SF	Recruit ratings: Scout: Rivals: 247Sports: ESPN:				
Jalen Smith; PF	Baltimore, MD	Mount Saint Joseph High School	6 ft 10 in (2.08 m)	195 lb (88 kg)	Jun 26, 2017
Jalen Smith; PF	Recruit ratings: Scout: Rivals: 247Sports: ESPN:				
Eric Ayala; PG	Wilmington, DE	IMG Academy	6 ft 5 in (1.96 m)	180 lb (82 kg)	Oct 14, 2017
Eric Ayala; PG	Recruit ratings: Scout: Rivals: 247Sports: ESPN:				
Serrel Smith Jr. SG	St. Petersburg, FL	St. Petersburg High School	6 ft 3 in (1.91 m)	170 lb (77 kg)	Apr 11, 2018
Serrel Smith Jr. SG	Recruit ratings: Scout: Rivals: 247Sports: ESPN:				
Trace Ramsey; SF	Crown Point, IN	Don Bosco Prep Academy	6 ft 7 in (2.01 m)	200 lb (91 kg)	Apr 26, 2018
Trace Ramsey; SF	Recruit ratings: Scout: Rivals: 247Sports: ESPN:				
Overall recruit ranking:
Note: In many cases, Scout, Rivals, 247Sports, On3, and ESPN may conflict in their listings of height and weight.; In these cases, the average was taken. ESPN grades are on a 100-point scale.; Sources: "2018 Maryland Commits". Rivals.; "2018 Team Ranking". Rivals.

== Roster ==
2017–18 Maryland Terrapins men's basketball team
Players
Coaches

Pos.	#	Name	Height	Weight	Year	Previous school	Hometown
F	0	Sean Obi	6 ft 9 in (2.06 m)	250 lb (113 kg)	RS Sr	Duke University	Kaduna, Nigeria
G	1	Anthony Cowan Jr.	6 ft 0 in (1.83 m)	170 lb (77 kg)	So	St. John's College High School	Bowie, Maryland
G	4	Kevin Huerter	6 ft 7 in (2.01 m)	190 lb (86 kg)	So	Shenendehowa High School	Clifton Park, New York
G	5	Dion Wiley	6 ft 4 in (1.93 m)	210 lb (95 kg)	RS Jr	Potomac High School (MD)	Oxon Hill, Maryland
G	10	Darryl Morsell	6 ft 4 in (1.93 m)	205 lb (93 kg)	Fr	Mount Saint Joseph High School	Baltimore, Maryland
G/F	11	Jared Nickens	6 ft 7 in (2.01 m)	205 lb (93 kg)	Sr	Westtown School	Monmouth Junction, New Jersey
G	12	Reese Mona (W)	6 ft 2 in (1.88 m)	180 lb (82 kg)	Fr	St. John's College High School	La Plata, Maryland
F	13	Ivan Bender (injured)	6 ft 9 in (2.06 m)	235 lb (107 kg)	Jr	Elektrotehnička Škola Tuzla	Čapljina, Bosnia and Herzegovina
F	15	Michal Čekovský	7 ft 1 in (2.16 m)	250 lb (113 kg)	Sr	Canarias Basketball Academy	Košice, Slovakia
G	20	Travis Valmon (W)	6 ft 1 in (1.85 m)	175 lb (79 kg)	So	Georgetown Prep	Rockville, Maryland
F	21	Justin Jackson (injured)	6 ft 7 in (2.01 m)	225 lb (102 kg)	So	Hill Academy	Toronto, Ontario
F	23	Bruno Fernando	6 ft 10 in (2.08 m)	245 lb (111 kg)	Fr	IMG Academy	Luanda, Angola
G	24	Andrew Terrell (injured) (W)	5 ft 10 in (1.78 m)	190 lb (86 kg)	Jr	Brebeuf Jesuit Prep	Indianapolis, Indiana
G	25	Alex Tostado (W)	6 ft 2 in (1.88 m)	178 lb (81 kg)	Fr	Montverde Academy	Guadalajara, Mexico
F	33	Joshua Tomaic	6 ft 9 in (2.06 m)	220 lb (100 kg)	RS Fr	Canarias Basketball Academy	Lanzarote, Canary Islands

Head coach

- Mark Turgeon (Kansas)

Assistant coach(es)

- Kevin Broadus (Bowie State)
- Dustin Clark (Texas A&M)
- Bino Ranson (Southern New Hampshire)

Legend

- (C) Team captain
- (S) Suspended
- (I) Ineligible
- (W) Walk-on
- Injured
- Current redshirt

Roster

== Schedule and results ==
The 2018 Big Ten tournament will be held at Madison Square Garden in New York City. Due to the Big East's use of that venue for their conference tournament, the Big Ten tournament will take place one week earlier than usual, ending the week before Selection Sunday. This could result in teams having nearly two weeks off before the NCAA tournament. As a result, it is anticipated that the Big Ten regular season will begin in mid-December. Coaches have requested that no Big Ten game be scheduled between Christmas and New Year's Day, accordingly each team will play two conference games in early December before finishing non-conference play.

Date time, TV	Rank^{#}	Opponent^{#}	Result	Record	High points	High rebounds	High assists	Site (attendance) city, state
Exhibition
Nov 2, 2017*; 7:00 pm, BTN+		Randolph–Macon	W 88–44	–	17 – Cowan Jr.	9 – Bender	3 – 4 tied	Xfinity Center (N/A); College Park, MD
Regular season
Nov 10, 2017*; 7:00 pm, BTN+		vs. Stony Brook; Long Island Hoops Showcase	W 76–61	1–0	15 – Cowan Jr.	14 – Jackson	4 – 2 tied	Nassau Coliseum (3,066); Uniondale, NY
Nov 12, 2017*; 6:00 pm, BTN+		Maryland Eastern Shore	W 96–43	2–0	16 – Cowan Jr.	9 – Cowan Jr.	4 – Jackson	Xfinity Center (13,914); College Park, MD
Nov 15, 2017*; 8:30 pm, FS1		Butler; Gavitt Tipoff Games	W 79–65	3–0	25 – Cowan Jr.	10 – Cowan Jr.	5 – Cowan Jr., Huerter	Xfinity Center (16,317); College Park, MD
Nov 18, 2017*; 8:30 pm, BTN		Bucknell; Emerald Coast Classic	W 80–78	4–0	17 – Cowan Jr.	10 – Jackson	5 – Cowan Jr.	Xfinity Center (14,841); College Park, MD
Nov 20, 2017*; 7:00 pm, BTN		Jackson State; Emerald Coast Classic	W 76–45	5–0	18 – Fernando	8 – Jackson	6 – Cowan Jr.	Xfinity Center (13,103); College Park, MD
Nov 24, 2017*; 8:30 pm, CBSSN		vs. St. Bonaventure; Emerald Coast Classic semifinals	L 61–63	5–1	13 – Cowan Jr.	8 – Jackson	5 – Huerter	NWFSC Arena (1,000); Niceville, FL
Nov 25, 2017*; 4:00 pm		vs. New Mexico; Emerald Coast Classic 3rd Place game	W 80–65	6–1	21 – Cowan Jr.	10 – Huerter	6 – Huerter	NWFSC Arena (1,250); Niceville, FL
Nov 27, 2017*; 7:00 pm, ESPN2		at Syracuse; ACC–Big Ten Challenge	L 70–72	6–2	23 – Huerter	7 – Jackson	5 – Jackson	Carrier Dome (20,852); Syracuse, NY
Dec 1, 2017; 7:00 pm, BTN		Purdue	L 75–80	6–3 (0–1)	20 – Cowan Jr.	8 – Jackson	5 – Cowan Jr.	Xfinity Center (17,308); College Park, MD
Dec 3, 2017; 8:00 pm, BTN		at Illinois	W 92–91 ^{OT}	7–3 (1–1)	27 – Cowan Jr.	8 – Fernando	6 – Cowan Jr.	State Farm Center (12,735); Champaign, IL
Dec 7, 2017*; 7:00 pm, BTN		Ohio	W 87–62	8–3	17 – Huerter	8 – 2 tied	7 – Cowan Jr.	Xfinity Center (12,914); College Park, MD
Dec 9, 2017*; 12:30 pm, BTN+		Gardner–Webb	W 82–60	9–3	18 – Morsell	6 – 2 tied	7 – Bender	Xfinity Center (12,588); College Park, MD
Dec 12, 2017*; 7:00 pm, BTN+		Catholic University	W 76–59	10–3	18 – Cowan Jr.	8 – Tomaic	7 – Cowan Jr.	Xfinity Center (12,540); College Park, MD
Dec 21, 2017*; 7:00 pm, ESPNU		Fairleigh Dickinson	W 75–50	11–3	13 – Cowan Jr., Morsell	15 – Huerter	8 – Huerter	Xfinity Center (13,133); College Park, MD
Dec 29, 2017*; 8:00 pm, FS1		UMBC	W 66–45	12–3	20 – Huerter	9 – Cowan Jr., Fernando	7 – Cowan Jr.	Xfinity Center (14,118); College Park, MD
Jan 2, 2018; 7:00 pm, BTN		Penn State	W 75–69	13–3 (2–1)	18 – Cowan Jr.	11 – Fernando	4 – Cowan Jr.	Xfinity Center (14,374); College Park, MD
Jan 4, 2018; 8:00 pm, FS1		at No. 1 Michigan State	L 61–91	13–4 (2–2)	26 – Cowan Jr.	7 – Fernando	4 – Cowan Jr.	Breslin Center (14,797); East Lansing, MI
Jan 7, 2018; 8:00 pm, FS1		Iowa	W 91–73	14–4 (3–2)	21 – Fernando	7 – Fernando	7 – Cowan Jr.	Xfinity Center (13,352); College Park, MD
Jan 11, 2018; 7:00 pm, ESPN2		at Ohio State	L 69–91	14–5 (3–3)	18 – Cekovsky	8 – Morsell	5 – Cowan Jr.	Value City Arena (12,014); Columbus, OH
Jan 15, 2018; 6:30 pm, FS1		at No. 23 Michigan	L 67–68	14–6 (3–4)	24 – Cowan Jr.	6 – 2 tied	4 – Cowan Jr.	Crisler Arena (10,545); Ann Arbor, MI
Jan 18, 2018; 8:30 pm, FS1		Minnesota	W 77–66	15–6 (4–4)	19 – Huerter	8 – Huerter	10 – Cowan Jr.	Xfinity Center (13,736); College Park, MD
Jan 22, 2018; 7:00 pm, FS1		at Indiana	L 68–71	15–7 (4–5)	18 – Cowan Jr.	11 – Huerter	5 – Huerter	Simon Skjodt Assembly Hall (17,222); Bloomington, IN
Jan 28, 2018; 1:00 pm, CBS		No. 6 Michigan State	L 68–74	15–8 (4–6)	12 – Huerter	7 – Morsell	9 – Cowan Jr.	Xfinity Center (17,950); College Park, MD
Jan 31, 2018; 8:30 pm, BTN		at No. 3 Purdue	L 67–75	15–9 (4–7)	20 – Fernando	10 – Fernando	8 – Cowan Jr.	Mackey Arena (14,804); West Lafayette, IN
Feb 4, 2018; 1:00 pm, CBS		Wisconsin	W 68–63	16–9 (5–7)	23 – Cowan Jr.	9 – Fernando	4 – Huerter	Xfinity Center (15,810); College Park, MD
Feb 7, 2018; 6:30 pm, BTN		at Penn State	L 70-74	16–10 (5–8)	15 – Cowan Jr.	9 – Fernando	5 – Cowan Jr.	Bryce Jordan Center (8,435); University Park, PA
Feb 10, 2018; 12:00 pm, ESPN2		Northwestern	W 73–57	17–10 (6–8)	22 – Huerter	9 – Morsell	5 – Huerter	Xfinity Center (16,164); College Park, MD
Feb 13, 2018; 7:00 pm, BTN		at Nebraska	L 66–70	17–11 (6–9)	21 – Fernando	9 – Fernando	7 – Cowan Jr.	Pinnacle Bank Arena (15,908); Lincoln, NE
Feb 17, 2018; 8:00 pm, BTN		Rutgers	W 61–51	18–11 (7–9)	18 – Fernando	16 – Fernando	6 – Cowan Jr.	Xfinity Center (15,587); College Park, MD
Feb 19, 2018; 7:00 pm, FS1		at Northwestern	W 71–64	19–11 (8–9)	18 – Huerter	6 – 2 tied	6 – Morsell	Allstate Arena (6,014); Rosemont, IL
Feb 24, 2018; 12:00 pm, ESPN		No. 17 Michigan	L 61–85	19–12 (8–10)	17 – Cowan Jr.	9 – Morsell	8 – Cowan Jr.	Xfinity Center (17,415); College Park, MD
Big Ten tournament
Mar 1, 2018; 12:00 pm, BTN	(8)	vs. (9) Wisconsin; Second round	L 54–59	19–13	20 – Huerter	9 – Fernando	4 – Cowan	Madison Square Garden; New York City, NY
*Non-conference game. ^{#}Rankings from AP Poll. (#) Tournament seedings in parentheses. All times are in Eastern Time.

== Rankings ==
Ranking movements Legend: RV = Received votes
	Week																			
Poll	Pre	1	2	3	4	5	6	7	8	9	10	11	12	13	14	15	16	17	18	Final
AP	RV	RV	RV	RV																Not released
Coaches	RV	RV																		

== See also ==
- 2017–18 Maryland Terrapins women's basketball team
