= Penn State Nittany Lions basketball statistical leaders =

The Penn State Nittany Lions basketball statistical leaders are individual statistical leaders of the Penn State Nittany Lions basketball program in various categories, including points, assists, blocks, rebounds, and steals. Within those areas, the lists identify single-game, single-season, and career leaders. The Nittany Lions represent the Pennsylvania State University in the NCAA's Big Ten Conference.

Penn State began competing in intercollegiate basketball in 1896. However, the school's record book does not generally list records from before the 1950s, as records from before this period are often incomplete and inconsistent. Since scoring was much lower in this era, and teams played much fewer games during a typical season, it is likely that few or no players from this era would appear on these lists anyway.

The NCAA did not officially record assists as a stat until the 1983–84 season, and blocks and steals until the 1985–86 season, but Penn State's record books includes players in these stats before these seasons. These lists are updated through the end of the 2021–22 season.

== Scoring ==
Career
Rk	Player	Points	Seasons
1	Talor Battle	2,213	2007–08 2008–09 2009–10 2010–11
2	Lamar Stevens	2,207	2016–17 2017–18 2018–19 2019–20
3	Jesse Arnelle	2,138	1951–52 1952–53 1953–54 1954–55
4	Joe Crispin	1,986	1997–98 1998–99 1999–00 2000–01
5	D.J. Newbill	1,812	2012–13 2013–14 2014–15
6	Shep Garner	1,629	2014–15 2015–16 2016–17 2017–18
7	Pete Lisicky	1,605	1994–95 1995–96 1996–97 1997–98
8	Jamelle Cornley	1,579	2005–06 2006–07 2007–08 2008–09
9	DeRon Hayes	1,570	1989–90 1990–91 1991–92 1992–93
10	Tim Frazier	1,543	2009–10 2010–11 2011–12 2012–13 2013–14

Season
Rk	Player	Points	Season
1	Jesse Arnelle	731	1954–55
2	Tony Carr	725	2017–18
3	D.J. Newbill	704	2014–15
4	Talor Battle	687	2010–11
5	Jarrett Stephens	657	1999–00
6	Jalen Pickett	655	2022–23
7	Joe Crispin	649	1999–00
8	Joe Crispin	642	2000–01
9	Lamar Stevens	637	2018–19
10	Talor Battle	635	2008–09

Single game
Rk	Player	Points	Season	Opponent
1	Gene Harris	46	1961–62	Holy Cross
2	Jesse Arnelle	44	1954–55	Bucknell
3	Jesse Arnelle	41	1954–55	Rutgers
	Jalen Pickett	41	2022–23	Illinois
5	Jesse Arnelle	40	1951–52	Georgetown
	Jesse Arnelle	40	1954–55	Temple
7	Jesse Arnelle	38	1954–55	Syracuse
	Bob Weiss	38	1964–65	Duke
9	Joe Crispin	36	2000–01	Pittsburgh
	Frank Wolf	36	1918–19	Susquehanna
	Mark DuMars	36	1959–60	Syracuse
	Ron Brown	36	1973–74	Virginia
	Steve Kuhn	36	1978–79	Colgate

== Rebounds ==
Career
Rk	Player	Rebounds	Seasons
1	Jesse Arnelle	1,238	1951–52 1952–53 1953–54 1954–55
2	Mike Watkins	953	2016–17 2017–18 2018–19 2019–20
3	Mike Lang	912	1979–80 1980–81 1981–82 1982–83
4	Lamar Stevens	875	2016–17 2017–18 2018–19 2019–20
5	John Harrar	854	2017–18 2018–19 2019–20 2020–21 2021–22
6	Ross Travis	816	2011–12 2012–13 2013–14 2014–15
7	Gene Harris	762	1959–60 1960–61 1961–62
8	Geary Claxton	755	2004–05 2005–06 2006–07 2007–08
	Jamelle Cornley	755	2005–06 2006–07 2007–08 2008–09
10	John Amaechi	745	1992–93 1993–94 1994–95

Season
Rk	Player	Rebounds	Season
1	Jesse Arnelle	428	1954–55
2	Jarrett Stephens	368	1999–00
3	John Harrar	320	2021–22
4	John Amaechi	316	1994–95
5	Gene Harris	298	1961–62
6	Aaron Johnson	297	2004–05
7	Bill Stansfield	289	1968–69
8	Jon Marshall	288	1973–74
9	Jesse Arnelle	285	1953–54
10	Mike Lang	279	1982–83

Single game
Rk	Player	Rebounds	Season	Opponent
1	Jesse Arnelle	27	1954–55	Temple
2	Jesse Arnelle	25	1954–55	Bucknell
	Jon Marshall	25	1973–74	Cincinnati
4	Aaron Johnson	24	2004–05	W. Carolina
	Jesse Arnelle	24	1952–53	Gettysburg
6	Tom Hancock	23	1957–58	Colgate
	Gene Harris	23	1961–62	Holy Cross
	Jon Marshall	23	1972–73	Pittsburgh
9	Gene Harris	22	1961–62	Gettysburg
	Jesse Arnelle	22	1954–55	Memphis St.

== Assists ==
Career
Rk	Player	Assists	Seasons
1	Tim Frazier	641	2009–10 2010–11 2011–12 2012–13 2013–14
2	Freddie Barnes	600	1988–89 1989–90 1990–91 1991–92
3	Dan Earl	574	1993–94 1994–95 1995–96 1997–98 1998–99
4	Talor Battle	517	2007–08 2008–09 2009–10 2010–11
5	Joe Crispin	485	1997–98 1998–99 1999–00 2000–01
	Tom Wilkinson	485	1976–77 1977–78 1978–79 1979–80
7	Monroe Brown	450	1988–89 1989–90 1990–91 1991–92
8	Titus Ivory	443	1996–97 1997–98 1998–99 1999–00 2000–01
9	Ben Luber	418	2003–04 2004–05 2005–06 2006–07
10	Ace Baldwin Jr.	412	2023–24 2024–25

Season
Rk	Player	Assists	Season
1	Jalen Pickett	243	2022–23
2	Ace Baldwin Jr.	213	2024–25
3	Ace Baldwin Jr.	199	2023–24
4	Tim Frazier	198	2011–12
5	Talor Battle	189	2008–09
6	Tony Carr	186	2017–18
7	Tim Frazier	182	2013–14
8	Dan Earl	181	1994–95
9	Joe Crispin	178	1999–00
10	Freddie Barnes	177	1991–92

Single game
Rk	Player	Assists	Season	Opponent
1	Ace Baldwin Jr.	16	2024–25	Coppin State
2	Tom Doaty	15	1974–75	Syracuse
3	Tony Carr	14	2017–18	Utah
	Tony Carr	14	2016–17	Indiana
	Ron Brown	14	1972–73	Bucknell
6	Ace Baldwin Jr.	13	2023–24	Purdue
	Dan Earl	13	1994–95	Iowa
	Tim Frazier	13	2013–14	Duquesne
9	Ace Baldwin Jr.	12	2023–24	Illinois
	Tom Daley	12	1969–70	Cornell
	Tom Wilkinson	12	1977–78	Rochester
	Tom Wilkinson	12	1977–78	Marquette
	Dan Earl	12	1995–96	Pennsylvania
	Dan Earl	12	1995–96	Iowa

== Steals ==
Career
Rk	Player	Steals	Seasons
1	Ron Brown	252	1971–72, 1972–73, 1973–74
2	Josh Reaves	250	2015–16, 2016–17, 2017–18, 2018–19
3	Monroe Brown	239	1988–89, 1989–90, 1990–91, 1991–92
4	Titus Ivory	218	1996–97, 1997–98, 1998–99, 1999–00, 2000–01
5	Tim Frazier	196	2009–10, 2010–11, 2011–12, 2012–13, 2013–14
6	Jamari Wheeler	191	2017–18, 2018–19, 2019–20, 2020–21
7	Dwight Gibson	182	1981–82, 1982–83, 1983–84, 1984–85
8	Tom Daley	176	1967–68, 1968–69, 1969–70
9	Dan Earl	162	1993–94, 1994–95, 1995–96, 1997–98, 1998–99
10	Ace Baldwin Jr.	159	2023–24, 2024–25

Season
Rk	Player	Steals	Season
1	Ron Brown	97	1973–74
2	Tom Daley	93	1969–70
3	Ace Baldwin Jr.	88	2023–24
4	Titus Ivory	84	2000–01
5	Monroe Brown	82	1990–91
6	Josh Reaves	80	2018–19
	Ron Brown	80	1972–73
8	Tim Frazier	76	2011–12
9	Ron Brown	75	1971–72
10	Josh Reaves	74	2017–18

Single game
Rk	Player	Steals	Season	Opponent
1	Kayden Mingo	8	2025–26	Sacred Heart
	Ace Baldwin Jr.	8	2023–24	Northwestern
	Tom Doaty	8	1969–70	West Virginia
	Monroe Brown	8	1990–91	Rhode Island
5	Josh Reaves	7	2017–18	Nebraska
	Stanley Pringle	7	2007–08	St. Francis
	Dan Earl	7	1998–99	Bucknell
	Titus Ivory	7	2000–01	Michigan
9	Myles Dread	6	2018–19	Wright State
	Jamari Wheeler	6	2017–18	Geo. Mason
	Dwight Gibson	6	1982–83	Temple
	Dwight Gibson	6	1983–84	Bradley
	Brian Allen	6	1987–88	St. Josephs
	Monroe Brown	6	1991–92	Miami (Ohio)
	Matt Gaudio	6	1995–96	Minnesota
	Travis Parker	6	2005–06	Northwestern
	Tim Frazier	6	2011–12	Nebraska
	Ace Baldwin Jr.	6	2024–25	Washington
	Ace Baldwin Jr.	6	2024–25	Nebraska
	Ace Baldwin Jr.	6	2024–25	Indiana
	Kayden Mingo	6	2025–26	North Carolina Central

== Blocks ==
Career
Rk	Player	Blocks	Seasons
1	Calvin Booth	428	1995–96 1996–97 1997–98 1998–99
2	Mike Watkins	265	2016–17 2017–18 2018–19 2019–20
3	John Amaechi	191	1992–93 1993–94 1994–95
4	Jordan Dickerson	133	2013–14 2014–15 2015–16
5	Lamar Stevens	127	2016–17 2017–18 2018–19 2019–20
6	Jan Jagla	110	2001–02 2002–03 2003–04
7	Gyasi Cline-Heard	107	1997–98 1998–99 1999–00 2000–01
8	Donovon Jack	100	2012–13 2013–14 2014–15 2015–16
9	Carvin Jefferson	99	1975–76 1976–77 1977–78 1978–79
10	Josh Reaves	92	2015–16 2016–17 2017–18 2018–19

Season
Rk	Player	Blocks	Season
1	Calvin Booth	140	1997–98
2	Calvin Booth	101	1995–96
3	Calvin Booth	95	1998–99
4	Calvin Booth	92	1996–97
5	Mike Watkins	90	2016–17
T-6	Mike Watkins	68	2017–18
T-6	John Amaechi	68	1994–95
8	Yanic Konan Niederhäuser	67	2024–25
9	Mike Watkins	66	2019–20
10	John Amaechi	65	1992–93

Single game
Rk	Player	Blocks	Season	Opponent
1	Calvin Booth	10	1997–98	Dayton
	Calvin Booth	10	1997–98	George Mason
3	Calvin Booth	9	1997–98	BYU
	Calvin Booth	9	1997–98	Lehigh
	Calvin Booth	9	1995–96	Bucknell
6	Mike Watkins	8	2019–20	Ole Miss
	Mike Watkins	8	2016–17	Nebraska
	Mike Watkins	8	2016–17	Wright State
	Calvin Booth	8	1995–96	Morgan St.
	Calvin Booth	8	1995–96	UT-Chattanooga
	Calvin Booth	8	1997–98	Northwestern
	Calvin Booth	8	1998–99	Indiana

== All Time Triple Doubles ==
Career
Rk	Player	Count	Season	Opponent
1	Calvin Booth	1	1998	Dayton (NIT 2nd Round)
2	Jalen Pickett	1	2022	Butler
