= 2018–19 Penn State Nittany Lions basketball team =

American college basketball season

2018–19 Penn State Nittany Lions basketball
- Conference: Big Ten Conference
- Record: 14–18 (7–13 Big Ten)
- Head coach: Pat Chambers (8th season)
- Associate head coach: Keith Urgo
- Assistant coaches: Jim Ferry; Kevin Freeman
- Home arena: Bryce Jordan Center

2018–19 Big Ten Conference men's basketball standings
	Conf.				Overall
Team	W		L	PCT	W		L	PCT
No. 5 Michigan State †	16	–	4	.800	32	–	7	.821
No. 13 Purdue	16	–	4	.800	26	–	10	.722
No. 8 Michigan	15	–	5	.750	30	–	7	.811
No. 21 Wisconsin	14	–	6	.700	23	–	11	.676
Maryland	13	–	7	.650	23	–	11	.676
Iowa	10	–	10	.500	23	–	12	.657
Minnesota	9	–	11	.450	22	–	14	.611
Ohio State	8	–	12	.400	20	–	15	.571
Indiana	8	–	12	.400	19	–	16	.543
Penn State	7	–	13	.350	14	–	18	.438
Illinois	7	–	13	.350	12	–	21	.364
Rutgers	7	–	13	.350	14	–	17	.452
Nebraska	6	–	14	.300	19	–	17	.528
Northwestern	4	–	16	.200	13	–	19	.406
† 2019 Big Ten tournament winner Rankings from AP poll

The 2018–19 Penn State Nittany Lions basketball team represented Pennsylvania State University in the 2018–19 NCAA Division I men's basketball season. They were led by head coach Pat Chambers, in his eighth season with the team, and played their home games at the Bryce Jordan Center in University Park, Pennsylvania as members of the Big Ten Conference. The Lions finished the season 14–18, 7–13 in Big Ten play to finish in a three-way tie for 10th place. They lost to Minnesota in the second round of the Big Ten tournament.

== Previous season ==
The Nittany Lions finished the 2017–18 season 26–13, 9–9 in Big Ten play to finish in a tie for sixth place. In the Big Ten tournament, they defeated Northwestern and Ohio State before losing to Purdue in the semifinals. They received a bid to the National Invitation Tournament, where they defeated Temple, Notre Dame, Marquette, and Mississippi State to advance to the NIT championship, where they defeated Utah to become NIT champions.

== Offseason ==
=== Departures ===
Name	Number	Pos.	Height	Weight	Year	Hometown	Reason for departure
Nazeer Bostick	4	G	6'4"	203	Sophomore	Philadelphia, PA	Transferred to St. Peter's
Tony Carr	10	G	6'5"	204	Sophomore	Philadelphia, PA	Declared for the 2018 NBA draft; selected 51st overall by the New Orleans Pelicans
Shep Garner	33	G	6'2"	196	Senior	Philadelphia, PA	Graduated
Julian Moore	44	F	6'10"	248	RS senior	Fort Washington, PA	Graduated

=== Incoming transfers ===
Name	Number	Pos.	Height	Weight	Year	Hometown	Previous school
Izaiah Brockington	12	G	6'4"	180	Sophomore	Philadelphia, PA	St. Bonaventure

=== 2018 recruiting class ===
College recruiting
Name	Hometown	School	Height	Weight	Commit date
Myles Dread #29 SG	Burtonsville, MD	Gonzaga College High School	6 ft 4 in (1.93 m)	205 lb (93 kg)	Jul 10, 2016
Myles Dread #29 SG	Recruit ratings: Scout: Rivals: 247Sports: ESPN:				
Rasir Bolton #29 PG	Virginia Beach, VA	Huntington Prep	6 ft 3 in (1.91 m)	170 lb (77 kg)	Jul 23, 2017
Rasir Bolton #29 PG	Recruit ratings: Scout: Rivals: 247Sports: ESPN:				
Daniil Kasatkin; G	Ivanovo, Russia	Mountain Mission	6 ft 8 in (2.03 m)	220 lb (100 kg)	Nov 21, 2017
Daniil Kasatkin; G	Recruit ratings: Scout: Rivals: 247Sports: ESPN:				
Myreon Jones #30 SG	Birmingham, AL	Lincoln Academy	6 ft 3 in (1.91 m)	170 lb (77 kg)	May 2, 2018
Myreon Jones #30 SG	Recruit ratings: Scout: Rivals: 247Sports: ESPN:				
Overall recruit ranking:
Note: In many cases, Scout, Rivals, 247Sports, On3, and ESPN may conflict in their listings of height and weight.; In these cases, the average was taken. ESPN grades are on a 100-point scale.; Sources: "2018 Team Ranking". Rivals.

== Roster ==
2018–19 Penn State Nittany Lions men's basketball team
Players
Coaches

Pos.	#	Name	Height	Weight	Year	Previous school	Hometown
G	0	Myreon Jones	6 ft 3 in (1.91 m)	170 lb (77 kg)	Fr	Lincoln Academy	Birmingham, AL
F	1	Deividas Zemgulis	6 ft 6 in (1.98 m)	220 lb (100 kg)	Sr	St. Mary Ryken	Kaunas, Lithuania
G	2	Myles Dread	6 ft 4 in (1.93 m)	205 lb (93 kg)	Fr	Gonzaga	Burtonsville, MD
F/C	3	Satchel Pierce	7 ft 0 in (2.13 m)	255 lb (116 kg)	RS Sr	The Kiski School; Virginia Tech	Barberton, OH
G	4	Daniil Kasatkin	6 ft 7 in (2.01 m)	205 lb (93 kg)	Fr	Mountain Mission	Vichuga, Russia
G	5	Jamari Wheeler	6 ft 1 in (1.85 m)	170 lb (77 kg)	So	Rock School	Gainesville, FL
G	10	Kyle McCloskey (W)	6 ft 5 in (1.96 m)	210 lb (95 kg)	RS Fr	Germantown Academy	Lower Gwynedd, PA
G/F	11	Lamar Stevens	6 ft 8 in (2.03 m)	226 lb (103 kg)	Jr	Roman Catholic	Philadelphia, PA
G	12	Izaiah Brockington (redshirt)	6 ft 4 in (1.93 m)	180 lb (82 kg)	So	Archbishop Ryan; St. Bonaventure	Philadelphia, PA
G	13	Rasir Bolton	6 ft 2 in (1.88 m)	175 lb (79 kg)	Fr	Massanutten Academy	Petersburg, VA
F	21	John Harrar	6 ft 9 in (2.06 m)	243 lb (110 kg)	So	Strath Haven	Atlanta, GA
F	22	Grant Hazle (W)	6 ft 5 in (1.96 m)	192 lb (87 kg)	Jr	Westbury Christian	Kingwood, TX
G	23	Josh Reaves	6 ft 4 in (1.93 m)	210 lb (95 kg)	Sr	Oak Hill Academy	Fairfax, VA
F/C	24	Mike Watkins	6 ft 9 in (2.06 m)	254 lb (115 kg)	RS Jr	Phelps School	Philadelphia, PA
F	35	Trent Buttrick	6 ft 8 in (2.03 m)	234 lb (106 kg)	So	Community School of Naples (Fla.)	Bloomsburg, PA

Head coach

- Pat Chambers (Philadelphia)

Assistant coach(es)

- Keith Urgo (Fairfield)
- Jim Ferry (Keene State)
- Kevin Freeman (Connecticut)

Legend

- (C) Team captain
- (S) Suspended
- (I) Ineligible
- (W) Walk-on
- Injured
- Current redshirt

Roster

=== Coaching staff ===
Position	Name	Year	Alma mater
Head coach	Patrick Chambers	2011	Philadelphia University (1994)
Associate head coach	Keith Urgo	2011	Fairfield University (2002)
Assistant coach	Kevin Freeman	2018	University of Connecticut (2000)
Assistant coach	Jim Ferry	2017	Keene State (1990)
Director of basketball operations	Ross Condon	2011	Villanova University (2007)
On-campus recruiting coordinator	Nicholas Colella	2015	Penn State (2013)
Athletic trainer	Jon Salazer	2001	Penn State (1993)
Director of player development	David Caporaletti	2011	Philadelphia University (1993)
Strength and conditioning coach	Greg Miskinis	2009	Penn State (2008)
Graduate manager	Stephen Griffin	2017	Philadelphia University (2014)
Graduate manager	Kevin Hudash	2018	Penn State (2017)

== Schedule and results ==
Date time, TV	Rank^{#}	Opponent^{#}	Result	Record	High points	High rebounds	High assists	Site (attendance) city, state
Exhibition
November 3, 2018*; 12:00 pm, ATTSNPT		at No. 13 West Virginia; Charity Exhibition	W 84–82	–	23 – Dread	11 – Stevens	5 – Wheeler	WVU Coliseum (9,517); Morgantown, WV
Regular season
November 9, 2018*; 7:30 pm, BTN Plus		North Florida; Cancún Challenge	W 87–72	1–0	22 – Stevens	10 – Stevens	6 – Bolton	Bryce Jordan Center (9,060); University Park, PA
November 12, 2018*; 7:00 pm, BTN		Jacksonville State; Cancún Challenge	W 76–61	2–0	25 – Tied	9 – Stevens	3 – Stevens	Bryce Jordan Center (7,722); University Park, PA
November 15, 2018*; 9:00 pm, FS1		at DePaul; Gavitt Tipoff Games	L 70–72 ^{OT}	2–1	25 – Stevens	12 – Stevens	8 – Reaves	Wintrust Arena (3,926); Chicago, IL
November 20, 2018*; 8:30 pm, CBSSN		vs. Wright State; Cancún Challenge Riviera Division semifinals	W 77–59	3–1	25 – Stevens	10 – Reaves	4 – Wheeler	Hard Rock Hotel Riviera Maya; Cancún, Mexico
November 21, 2018*; 8:30 pm, CBSSN		vs. Bradley; Cancún Challenge Riviera Division championship	L 56–59	3–2	27 – Stevens	9 – Reaves	3 – Stevens	Hard Rock Hotel Riviera Maya (1,473); Cancún, Mexico
November 27, 2018*; 7:00 pm, ESPN2		No. 13 Virginia Tech; ACC–Big Ten Challenge	W 63–62	4–2	18 – Jones	8 – Stevens	3 – Tied	Bryce Jordan Center (8,373); University Park, PA
December 1, 2018; 5:00 pm, BTN		at No. 24 Maryland	L 59–66	4–3 (0–1)	19 – Stevens	8 – Stevens	2 – Tied	Xfinity Center (15,481); College Park, MD
December 4, 2018; 7:00 pm, BTN		Indiana	L 62–64	4–4 (0–2)	17 – Bolton	10 – Stevens	3 – Reaves	Bryce Jordan Center (8,972); University Park, PA
December 8, 2018*; 7:00 pm, BTN Plus		Colgate	W 76–65	5–4	27 – Bolton	16 – Watkins	5 – Reaves	Bryce Jordan Center (8,056); University Park, PA
December 15, 2018*; 2:00 pm, ESPNU		vs. NC State; Boardwalk Classic	L 78–89	5–5	25 – Bolton	6 – Stevens	5 – Dread	Boardwalk Hall (N/A); Atlantic City, NJ
December 19, 2018*; 7:00 pm, CBSSN		vs. Duquesne; PPG Paints Arena Showcase	W 73–67	6–5	25 – Stevens	12 – Watkins	3 – Reaves	PPG Paints Arena (2,537); Pittsburgh, PA
December 21, 2018*; 9:00 pm, SECN		at Alabama	L 64–73	6–6	13 – Buttrick	8 – Watkins	3 – Tied	Coleman Coliseum (10,142); Tuscaloosa, AL
December 29, 2018*; 1:00 pm, BTN Plus		UMBC	W 74–52	7–6	18 – Bolton	7 – Stevens	5 – Reaves	Bryce Jordan Center (9,042); University Park, PA
January 3, 2019; 7:00 pm, ESPN		at No. 2 Michigan	L 55–68	7–7 (0–3)	19 – Watkins	12 – Watkins	3 – Reaves	Crisler Center (12,707); Ann Arbor, MI
January 6, 2019; 7:30 pm, BTN		No. 22 Wisconsin	L 52–71	7–8 (0–4)	22 – Stevens	10 – Watkins	5 – Bolton	Bryce Jordan Center (8,342); University Park, PA
January 10, 2019; 9:00 pm, ESPN2		at Nebraska	L 64–70	7–9 (0–5)	20 – Reaves	14 – Watkins	3 – Stevens	Pinnacle Bank Arena (15,753); Lincoln, NE
January 13, 2019; 4:30 pm, CBS		No. 6 Michigan State	L 56–71	7–10 (0–6)	20 – Stevens	7 – Watkins	9 – Reaves	Bryce Jordan Center (10,196); University Park, PA
January 16, 2019; 7:00 pm, BTN		No. 23 Iowa	L 82–89	7–11 (0–7)	16 – Reaves	11 – Watkins	7 – Tied	Bryce Jordan Center (7,733); University Park, PA
January 19, 2019; 8:30 pm, BTN		at Minnesota	L 64–65	7–12 (0–8)	27 – Stevens	9 – Watkins	4 – Reaves	Williams Arena (11,042); Minneapolis, MN
January 26, 2019; 4:30 pm, BTN		Rutgers	L 60–64	7–13 (0–9)	21 – Stevens	9 – Watkins	4 – Wheeler	Bryce Jordan Center (13,366); University Park, PA
January 31, 2019; 6:30 pm, FS1		No. 17 Purdue	L 90–99 ^{OT}	7–14 (0–10)	24 – Stevens	11 – Watkins	4 – Tied	Bryce Jordan Center (8,961); University Park, PA
February 4, 2019; 8:00 pm, FS1		at Northwestern	W 59–52	8–14 (1–10)	18 – Stevens	7 – Stevens	6 – Stevens	Welsh–Ryan Arena (6,541); Evanston, IL
February 7, 2019; 7:00 pm, ESPN		at Ohio State	L 70–74	8–15 (1–11)	20 – Tied	12 – Stevens	3 – Wheeler	Value City Arena (15,824); Columbus, OH
February 12, 2019; 8:30 pm, BTN		No. 6 Michigan	W 75–69	9–15 (2–11)	26 – Stevens	12 – Stevens	4 – Wheeler	Bryce Jordan Center (9,120); University Park, PA
February 16, 2019; 4:00 pm, BTN		at No. 12 Purdue	L 64–76	9–16 (2–12)	18 – Stevens	6 – Stevens	2 – Tied	Mackey Arena (14,804); West Lafayette, IN
February 19, 2019; 7:00 pm, FS1		Nebraska	W 95–71	10–16 (3–12)	29 – Stevens	8 – Stevens	5 – Tied	Bryce Jordan Center (8,049); University Park, PA
February 23, 2019; 12:00 pm, BTN		at Illinois	W 83–76	11–16 (4–12)	25 – Stevens	12 – Watkins	5 – Wheeler	State Farm Center (15,544); Champaign, IL
February 27, 2019; 6:30 pm, BTN		No. 17 Maryland	W 78–61	12–16 (5–12)	24 – Stevens	5 – Tied	7 – Wheeler	Bryce Jordan Center (9,020); University Park, PA
March 2, 2019; 1:00 pm, BTN		at No. 19 Wisconsin	L 57-61	12-17 (5-13)	22 – Stevens	10 – Stevens	4 – Wheeler	Kohl Center (17,287); Madison, WI
March 6, 2019; 7:00 pm, BTN		at Rutgers	W 66-65	13–17 (6–13)	18 – Stevens	14 – Watkins	2 – Tied	Louis Brown Athletic Center (8,000); Piscataway, NJ
March 10, 2019; 12:00 pm, FS1		Illinois	W 72–56	14–17 (7–13)	26 – Reaves	11 – Reaves	9 – Wheeler	Bryce Jordan Center (9,678); University Park, PA
Big Ten tournament
March 14, 2019; 7:00 pm, BTN	(10)	vs. (7) Minnesota; Second round	L 72–77 ^{OT}	14–18	24 – Stevens	7 – Tied	5 – Reaves	United Center; Chicago, IL
*Non-conference game. ^{#}Rankings from AP Poll. (#) Tournament seedings in parentheses. All times are in Eastern Time.
