= 2016–17 Penn State Nittany Lions basketball team =

American college basketball season

2016–17 Penn State Nittany Lions basketball
- Conference: Big Ten Conference
- Record: 15–18 (6–12 Big Ten)
- Head coach: Pat Chambers (6th season)
- Assistant coaches: Keith Urgo; Dwayne Anderson; Ross Condon
- Home arena: Bryce Jordan Center

2016–17 Big Ten Conference men's basketball standings
	Conf.				Overall
Team	W		L	PCT	W		L	PCT
No. 15 Purdue	14	–	4	.778	27	–	8	.771
No. 25 Wisconsin	12	–	6	.667	27	–	10	.730
Maryland	12	–	6	.667	24	–	9	.727
Minnesota	11	–	7	.611	24	–	10	.706
No. 23 Michigan †	10	–	8	.556	26	–	12	.684
Northwestern	10	–	8	.556	24	–	12	.667
Michigan State	10	–	8	.556	20	–	15	.571
Iowa	10	–	8	.556	19	–	15	.559
Illinois	8	–	10	.444	20	–	15	.571
Ohio State	7	–	11	.389	17	–	15	.531
Indiana	7	–	11	.389	18	–	16	.529
Penn State	6	–	12	.333	15	–	18	.455
Nebraska	6	–	12	.333	12	–	19	.387
Rutgers	3	–	15	.167	15	–	18	.455
† 2017 Big Ten tournament winner Rankings from AP poll

The 2016–17 Penn State Nittany Lions basketball team represented Pennsylvania State University in the 2016–17 NCAA Division I men's basketball season. They were led by head coach Pat Chambers, in his sixth season with the team. They played their home games at the Bryce Jordan Center in University Park, Pennsylvania and were members of the Big Ten Conference. They finished the season 15–18, 6–12 in Big Ten play to finish in a tie for 12th place. As the No. 13 seed in the Big Ten tournament, they beat Nebraska in the first round before losing to Michigan State in the second round.

== Previous season ==
The Nittany Lions finished the 2015–16 season with a record of 16–16, 7–11 in Big Ten play to finish in tenth place in conference. They lost to Ohio State in the second round of the Big Ten tournament.

== Offseason ==
=== Departures ===
Name	Number	Pos.	Height	Weight	Year	Hometown	Notes
Devin Foster	3	G	6'2"	205	Senior	Dayton, OH	Graduated
Donovan Jack	5	F	6'9"	210	Senior	Reading, PA	Graduated
Brandon Taylor	10	F	6'7"	225	Senior	Tabernacle, NJ	Graduated
Samuel Halle	11	G	6'0"	185	Junior	Springfield, VA	Graduated
Jordan Dickerson	32	C	7'1"	245	Senior	Brooklyn, NY	Graduated

=== Incoming transfers ===
Name	Number	Pos.	Height	Weight	Year	Hometown	Previous School
Satchel Pierce	32	F	7'0"	255	Junior	Barberton, OH	Transferred from Virginia Tech. Under NCAA transfer rules, Pierce will have to sit out in the 2016–17 season. Will have two years of eligibility left.

=== 2016 recruiting class ===
College recruiting information
Name	Hometown	School	Height	Weight	Commit date
Tony Carr #7 PG	Philadelphia, PA	Roman Catholic High School	6 ft 5 in (1.96 m)	200 lb (91 kg)	Nov 12, 2015
Tony Carr #7 PG	Recruit ratings: Scout: Rivals: 247Sports: ESPN:				
Joe Hampton #31 PF	Hyattsville, MD	Oak Hill Academy	6 ft 7 in (2.01 m)	265 lb (120 kg)	Nov 12, 2015
Joe Hampton #31 PF	Recruit ratings: Scout: Rivals: 247Sports: ESPN:				
Lamar Stevens #16 SF	Philadelphia, PA	Roman Catholic High School	6 ft 7 in (2.01 m)	215 lb (98 kg)	Nov 12, 2015
Lamar Stevens #16 SF	Recruit ratings: Scout: Rivals: 247Sports: ESPN:				
Nazeer Bostick; SG	Philadelphia, PA	Roman Catholic High School	6 ft 5 in (1.96 m)	180 lb (82 kg)	Nov 12, 2015
Nazeer Bostick; SG	Recruit ratings: Scout: Rivals: 247Sports: ESPN:				
Overall recruit ranking:
Note: In many cases, Scout, Rivals, 247Sports, On3, and ESPN may conflict in their listings of height and weight.; In these cases, the average was taken. ESPN grades are on a 100-point scale.; Sources: "2016 Team Ranking". Rivals.

== Personnel ==
=== Roster ===
2016–17 Penn State Nittany Lions men's basketball team
Players
Coaches

Pos.	#	Name	Height	Weight	Year	Previous school	Hometown
F	0	Payton Banks	6 ft 6 in (1.98 m)	223 lb (101 kg)	RS Jr	Lutheran	Orange, CA
F	1	Deividas Zemgulis	6 ft 6 in (1.98 m)	220 lb (100 kg)	So	St. Mary Ryken	Kaunas, Lithuania
G	4	Nazeer Bostick	6 ft 4 in (1.93 m)	187 lb (85 kg)	Fr	Roman Catholic	Philadelphia, PA
G	5	Terrence Samuel	6 ft 3 in (1.91 m)	208 lb (94 kg)	RS Jr	Victory Collegiate; Connecticut	Brooklyn, NY
G	10	Tony Carr	6 ft 3 in (1.91 m)	198 lb (90 kg)	Fr	Roman Catholic	Philadelphia, PA
F	11	Lamar Stevens	6 ft 7 in (2.01 m)	218 lb (99 kg)	Fr	Roman Catholic	Philadelphia, PA
F	20	Alex Zhao (W)	6 ft 6 in (1.98 m)	220 lb (100 kg)	So	Bishop O'Dowd	Shenyang, China
G	21	Isaiah Washington	6 ft 2 in (1.88 m)	163 lb (74 kg)	RS So	Williamsport	Williamsport, PA
F	22	Grant Hazle (W)	6 ft 5 in (1.96 m)	192 lb (87 kg)	Fr	Westbury Christian	Kingwood, TX
G	23	Josh Reaves	6 ft 4 in (1.93 m)	210 lb (95 kg)	So	Oak Hill Academy	Fairfax, VA
F	24	Mike Watkins	6 ft 9 in (2.06 m)	246 lb (112 kg)	RS Fr	Phelps School	Philadelphia, PA
F	32	Satchel Pierce (I) (redshirt)	6 ft 9 in (2.06 m)	258 lb (117 kg)	Jr	The Kiski School; Virginia Tech	Barberton, OH
G	33	Shep Garner	6 ft 2 in (1.88 m)	187 lb (85 kg)	Jr	Roman Catholic HS	Philadelphia, PA
F	44	Julian Moore	6 ft 10 in (2.08 m)	235 lb (107 kg)	RS Jr	Germantown Acad	Fort Washington, PA

Head coach

- Pat Chambers (Philadelphia)

Assistant coach(es)

- Keith Urgo (Fairfield)
- Dwayne Anderson (Villanova)
- Ross Condon (Villanova)

Legend

- (C) Team captain
- (S) Suspended
- (I) Ineligible
- (W) Walk-on
- Injured
- Current redshirt

Roster

=== Coaching staff ===
Position	Name	Year	Alma mater
Head coach	Patrick Chambers	2011	Philadelphia University (1994)
Associate head coach	Keith Urgo	2011	Fairfield University (2002)
Assistant coach	Dwayne Anderson	2013	Villanova University (2009)
Assistant coach	Ross Condon	2011	Villanova University (2007)
Director of Basketball Operations	David Caporaletti	2011	Philadelphia University (1993)
On campus recruiting coordinator	Nicholas Colella	2015	Penn State (2013)
Athletic trainer	Jon Salazer	2001	Penn State (1993)
Director of player development	Ryan Devlin	2013	Philadelphia University (2005)
Strength and conditioning coach	Greg Miskinis	2009	Penn State (2008)
Graduate Manager	Evann Baker	2015	Quinnipiac University (2011)
Graduate Manager	Kevin Hacke	2015	West Virginia University (2013)

== Schedule and results ==
Date time, TV	Rank^{#}	Opponent^{#}	Result	Record	Site (attendance) city, state
Exhibition
Nov 4, 2016*; 6:00 pm, BTN+		Lock Haven	W 91–65		Bryce Jordan Center (4,388); University Park, PA
Non-conference regular season
Nov 11, 2016*; 7:00 pm, ESPN3		Albany; Hall of Fame Tip Off	L 81–87	0–1	Bryce Jordan Center (6,230); University Park, PA
Nov 13, 2016*; 6:00 pm, BTN		Duquesne	W 82–74	1–1	Bryce Jordan Center (5,856); University Park, PA
Nov 15, 2016*; 7:00 pm, ESPN3		Grand Canyon; Hall of Fame Tip Off	W 85–76	2–1	Bryce Jordan Center (5,678); University Park, PA
Nov 19, 2016*; 12:30 pm, ESPN3		vs. No. 1 Duke; Hall of Fame Tip Off semifinals	L 68–78	2–2	Mohegan Sun Arena; Uncasville, CT
Nov 20, 2016*; 3:30 pm, ESPN2		vs. No. 24 Cincinnati; Hall of Fame Tip Off consolation	L 50–71	2–3	Mohegan Sun Arena; Uncasville, CT
Nov 23, 2016*; 7:00 pm, BTN		Colgate	W 72–59	3–3	Bryce Jordan Center (5,112); University Park, PA
Nov 26, 2016*; 4:00 pm		at George Washington	W 74–68	4–3	Charles E. Smith Center (2,378); Washington, D.C.
Nov 29, 2016*; 7:00 pm, ESPNU		Georgia Tech; ACC–Big Ten Challenge	W 67–60	5–3	Bryce Jordan Center (6,032); University Park, PA
Dec 3, 2016*; 5:00 pm, BTN+		Wright State	W 72–50	6–3	Bryce Jordan Center (6,227); University Park, PA
Dec 7, 2016*; 7:00 pm, BTN		George Mason	L 66–85	6–4	Bryce Jordan Center (5,694); University Park, PA
Dec 10, 2016*; 2:30 pm, CBSSN		vs. Pittsburgh; Never Forget Tribute Classic	L 73–81	6–5	Prudential Center (16,165); Newark, NJ
Dec 18, 2016*; 11:00 am, FS1		vs. St. John's; Madison Square Garden Holiday Festival	W 92–76	7–5	Madison Square Garden (8,200); New York City, NY
Dec 21, 2016*; 5:00 pm, BTN+		Morgan State	W 96–55	8–5	Bryce Jordan Center (4,009); University Park, PA
Big Ten regular season
Dec 27, 2016; 3:00 pm, ESPN2		Northwestern	L 77–87	8–6 (0–1)	Bryce Jordan Center (5,811); University Park, PA
Jan 1, 2017; 2:30 pm, ESPNU		at Rutgers	W 60–47	9–6 (1–1)	Louis Brown Athletic Center (6,079); Piscataway, NJ
Jan 4, 2017; 8:30 pm, BTN		at Michigan	L 69–72	9–7 (1–2)	Crisler Center (11,385); Ann Arbor, MI
Jan 7, 2017; 1:00 pm, ESPN		vs. Michigan State; Palestra Big Ten Showcase	W 72–63	10–7 (2–2)	Palestra (8,722); Philadelphia, PA
Jan 14, 2017; 12:00 pm, ESPNU		No. 24 Minnesota	W 52–50	11–7 (3–2)	Bryce Jordan Center (11,759); University Park, PA
Jan 18, 2017; 7:00 pm, BTN		Indiana	L 75–78	11–8 (3–3)	Bryce Jordan Center (7,818); University Park, PA
Jan 21, 2017; 12:00 pm, BTN		at No. 21 Purdue	L 52–77	11–9 (3–4)	Mackey Arena (14,804); West Lafayette, IN
Jan 24, 2017; 9:00 pm, BTN		at No. 15 Wisconsin	L 55–82	11–10 (3–5)	Kohl Center (17,287); Madison, WI
Jan 28, 2017; 4:30 pm, BTN		Illinois	W 71–67	12–10 (4–5)	Bryce Jordan Center (10,202); University Park, PA
Feb 1, 2017; 6:30 pm, BTN		at Indiana	L 102–110 ^{3OT}	12–11 (4–6)	Assembly Hall (17,222); Bloomington, IN
Feb 4, 2017; 1:00 pm, ESPNU		Rutgers	L 68–70	12–12 (4–7)	Bryce Jordan Center (9,529); University Park, PA
Feb 7, 2017; 6:00 pm, BTN		No. 21 Maryland	W 70–64	13–12 (5–7)	Bryce Jordan Center (7,063); University Park, PA
Feb 11, 2017; 2:00 pm, BTN		at Illinois	W 83–70	14–12 (6–7)	State Farm Center (13,010); Champaign, IL
Feb 14, 2017; 9:00 pm, BTN		at Nebraska	L 66–82	14–13 (6–8)	Pinnacle Bank Arena (15,642); Lincoln, NE
Feb 21, 2017; 6:00 pm, BTN		No. 14 Purdue	L 70–74 ^{OT}	14–14 (6–9)	Bryce Jordan Center (7,505); University Park, PA
Feb 25, 2017; 3:00 pm, BTN		at Minnesota	L 71–81	14–15 (6–10)	Williams Arena (14,625); Minneapolis, MN
Feb 28, 2017; 8:30 pm, BTN		Ohio State	L 70–71	14–16 (6–11)	Bryce Jordan Center (7,343); University Park, PA
Mar 5, 2017; 1:00 pm, BTN		at Iowa	L 79–90	14–17 (6–12)	Carver–Hawkeye Arena (15,400); Iowa City, IA
Big Ten tournament
Mar 8, 2017; 4:30 pm, ESPN2	(13)	vs. (12) Nebraska; First round	W 76–67 ^{OT}	15–17	Verizon Center; Washington, D.C.
Mar 9, 2017; 2:25 pm, BTN	(13)	vs. (5) Michigan State; Second round	L 51–78	15–18	Verizon Center; Washington, D.C.
*Non-conference game. ^{#}Rankings from AP poll. (#) Tournament seedings in parentheses. All times are in Eastern Time.
