= Lamar Stevens =

American basketball player (born 1997)

- Stevens with Partizan in 2026

No. 11 – Partizan Belgrade
- Position: Small forward / power forward
- League: Serbian SuperLeague; ABA League; EuroLeague

Personal information
- Born: July 9, 1997 (age 29) Philadelphia, Pennsylvania, U.S.
- Listed height: 6 ft 7 in (2.01 m)
- Listed weight: 230 lb (104 kg)

Career information
- High school: The Haverford School (Haverford, Pennsylvania); Roman Catholic (Philadelphia, Pennsylvania)
- College: Penn State (2016–2020)
- NBA draft: 2020: undrafted
- Playing career: 2020–present

Career history
- 2020–2023: Cleveland Cavaliers
- 2020–2021: →Canton Charge
- 2023–2024: Boston Celtics
- 2024: Memphis Grizzlies
- 2024–2025: Motor City Cruise
- 2025: Memphis Grizzlies
- 2025–2026: Paris Basketball
- 2026–present: Partizan

Career highlights
- NIT champion (2018); 2× First-team All-Big Ten (2019, 2020); Big Ten All-Freshman Team (2017); NIT MVP (2018)
- Stats at NBA.com
- Stats at Basketball Reference

Lamar Brandon Stevens (born July 9, 1997) is an American professional basketball player for Partizan of the Serbian SuperLeague, the ABA League, and the EuroLeague. He played college basketball for the Penn State Nittany Lions.

== High school career ==
Stevens attended The Haverford School in Haverford Township, Pennsylvania for his sophomore and junior years. At Haverford, he was named to All-State and All-District teams both years, as well as leading Haverford to two straight state championship runs. During his senior season he attended Roman Catholic High School in Philadelphia where he played alongside future Penn State teammates, Tony Carr and Nazeer Bostick. During his senior year, Stevens was once again named to All-State and All-District teams, as well as All-Philadelphia. Roman Catholic dominated all season, ranking Number 1 in Pennsylvania and top 15 nationally, according to MaxPreps. Stevens scored 20 points on the way to winning the state championship game.

=== Recruiting ===
After the season, Stevens was ranked 100th on the ESPN's Top 100 recruits of 2016 and third-ranked overall in Pennsylvania.

College recruiting
Name	Hometown	School	Height	Weight	Commit date
Lamar Stevens; SF	Philadelphia, PA	Roman Catholic (PA)	6 ft 6 in (1.98 m)	215 lb (98 kg)	Sep 18, 2015
Lamar Stevens; SF	Recruit ratings: Scout: Rivals: 247Sports: ESPN: (80)				
Overall recruit ranking:
Note: In many cases, Scout, Rivals, 247Sports, On3, and ESPN may conflict in their listings of height and weight.; In these cases, the average was taken. ESPN grades are on a 100-point scale.; Sources: "2016 Team Ranking". Rivals.

Honors and Awards

- 3x PIAA AAAA All-State (2014, 2015, 2016)
- 2016 PIAA Class AAAA State Champions
- 2016 Philadelphia Player of the Year by the Daily News
- All-Philadelphia First Team (2016)
- 3x PIAA District 12 First Team (2014, 2015, 2016)

== College career ==
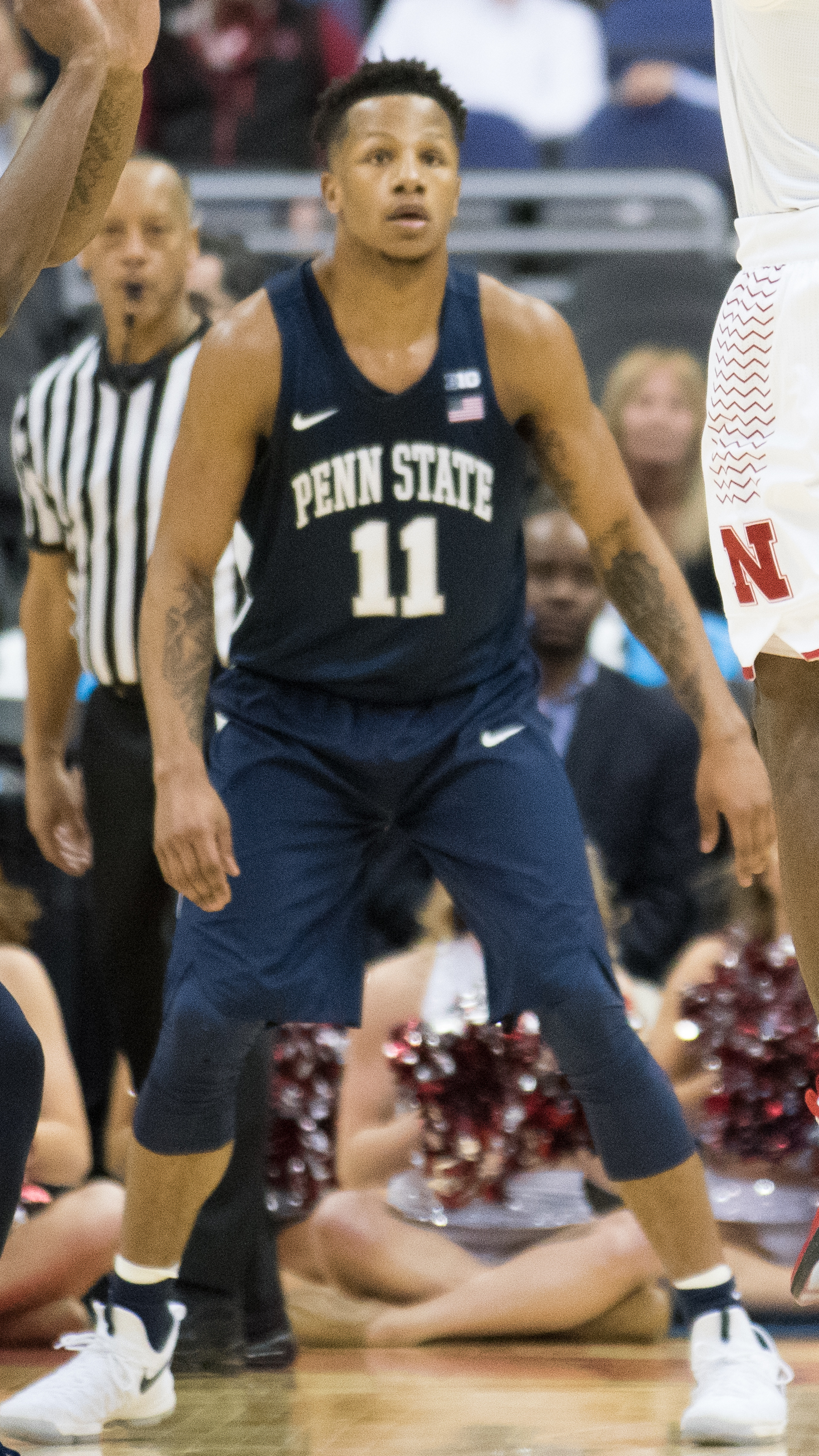
Stevens with Penn State in 2017

During Stevens' freshman season at Penn State, he started all 33 games for the Nittany Lions and was named Freshman of the Week multiple times with teammate Tony Carr. He was named as a First Team All-Freshman by the Big Ten and averaged over 12 points per game his first season.

Stevens scored a season-high 30 points on January 5, 2018, against Northwestern. As a sophomore, Stevens averaged 15.5 points and 5.9 rebounds per game. He helped the Nittany Lions post a 26–13 record and win the NIT. Stevens was named Most Outstanding Player of the NIT.

As a junior, Stevens averaged 19.9 points and 7.7 rebounds per game. He was named to the All-Big Ten Conference first team by the media and earned second-team honors from the league's coaches. Stevens was an All-District VII second-team selection by the National Association of Basketball Coaches. After the season, Stevens declared for the 2019 NBA draft but decided to return to Penn State.

On December 16, 2019, Stevens was named Big Ten player of the week after scoring 18 points and collecting 11 rebounds in a victory over fourth-ranked and previously undefeated Maryland. On February 1, 2020, Stevens became the third player in school history to surpass 2,000 career points, scoring 13 points in a 76–64 win against Nebraska. He scored a career-high 33 points on February 8, leading the Nittany Lions to a 83–77 win over Minnesota. At the close of the regular season, Stevens was named to the First Team All-Big Ten by the coaches and media.

Stevens finished his college career as Penn State's second all-time leading scorer with 2,207 points, seven shy of breaking the scoring record set by Talor Battle. Stevens missed out on an opportunity to set the record when the 2020 Big Ten Tournament and NCAA Tournament were cancelled due to the COVID-19 pandemic.

== Professional career ==
=== Cleveland Cavaliers (2020–2023) ===
After going undrafted in the 2020 NBA draft, Stevens was signed by the Cleveland Cavaliers to a two-way contract on November 28, 2020. He made his NBA debut on December 28, 2020, in a 118–94 win over the Philadelphia 76ers. He scored two points and collected two rebounds in five minutes of action. On February 23, 2021, he scored eight points, including a game-winner, in a 112–111 win over the Atlanta Hawks and on April 14, he signed a multi-year contract with the Cavaliers. On January 12, 2022, Stevens scored a career and game high of 23 points in a 111–91 win over the Utah Jazz.

On July 6, 2023, Stevens was traded to the San Antonio Spurs as part of a three-team trade with the Miami Heat and Cleveland Cavaliers, and on July 17, he was waived.

=== Boston Celtics (2023–2024) ===
On September 26, 2023, Stevens signed with the Boston Celtics. He appeared in 19 of 50 games with the Celtics, averaging 2.8 points and 1.6 rebounds per game. Due to a rash of injuries at the center position, Stevens entered the Celtics' starting lineup for the first and only time on December 15, 2023, logging 8 points and 3 rebounds in a 128–111 victory over the Orlando Magic..

=== Memphis Grizzlies (2024) ===
On February 7, 2024, the Celtics traded Stevens and two second-round picks to the Memphis Grizzlies in exchange for Xavier Tillman.

=== Motor City Cruise (2024–2025) ===
On September 30, 2024, Stevens signed with the Detroit Pistons, but was waived on October 17. On October 29, he joined the Motor City Cruise.

=== Second stint with Grizzlies (2025) ===
On February 21, 2025, Stevens signed a 10-day contract with the Memphis Grizzlies. After completing a second 10-day contract, on March 13, Stevens signed a standard NBA contract to remain with the Grizzlies for the remainder of the 2024-2025 season. On April 13, Stevens scored a career-high 31 points, as the Grizzlies clinched a 132-97 win in their reserve-heavy regular season finale against the Dallas Mavericks.

=== Paris Basketball (2025–2026) ===
On July 22, 2025, Stevens signed with Paris Basketball of the LNB Élite and EuroLeague.

=== Partizan (2026–present) ===
On July 22, 2026, Stevens signed a two–year deal with Partizan of the Serbian SuperLeague, the ABA League, and the EuroLeague.

== Career statistics ==
Legend
GP	Games played	GS	Games started	MPG	Minutes per game
FG%	Field goal percentage	3P%	3-point field goal percentage	FT%	Free throw percentage
RPG	Rebounds per game	APG	Assists per game	SPG	Steals per game
BPG	Blocks per game	PPG	Points per game	**Bold**	Career high

=== NBA ===
==== Regular season ====
Year	Team	GP	GS	MPG	FG%	3P%	FT%	RPG	APG	SPG	BPG	PPG
2020–21	Cleveland	40	0	12.5	.456	.160	.725	2.4	.6	.4	.3	4.1
2021–22	Cleveland	**63**	13	16.1	**.489**	.277	.707	2.6	.7	.5	.3	6.1
2022–23	Cleveland	62	**25**	18.1	.448	.316	.702	3.3	.5	.4	.3	5.3
2023–24	Boston	19	1	6.4	.467	**.375**	.727	1.6	.4	.3	.3	2.8
2023–24	Memphis	19	2	**23.0**	.446	.289	**.791**	**5.1**	**1.1**	**.9**	**.9**	**11.5**
2024–25	Memphis	17	1	9.1	.460	.296	.727	2.2	.5	.3	.2	4.4
Career		220	42	15.2	.463	.287	.726	2.9	.6	.5	.3	5.6

==== Playoffs ====
Year	Team	GP	GS	MPG	FG%	3P%	FT%	RPG	APG	SPG	BPG	PPG
2023	Cleveland	**2**	0	4.4	**.500**	**1.000**	**1.000**	1.5	.0	.0	.0	**2.5**
2025	Memphis	**2**	0	**6.0**	.222	.000	–	**2.0**	**.5**	.0	.0	2.0
Career		4	0	5.3	.273	.250	1.000	1.8	.3	.0	.0	2.3

=== College ===
Year	Team	GP	GS	MPG	FG%	3P%	FT%	RPG	APG	SPG	BPG	PPG
2016–17	Penn State	33	33	27.8	.429	**.344**	.767	5.5	1.7	.8	.6	12.7
2017–18	Penn State	**39**	**39**	33.1	**.465**	.319	.696	5.9	1.9	.6	1.1	15.5
2018–19	Penn State	32	32	**36.9**	.422	.220	**.770**	**7.7**	2.1	.7	.8	**19.9**
2019–20	Penn State	31	31	31.1	.423	.263	.719	6.9	**2.2**	**1.1**	**1.2**	17.6
Career		135	135	32.2	.435	.276	.738	6.5	1.9	.8	.9	16.3

== Personal life ==
Stevens is the author of the children's book Lamar's Climb -- A Journey to Happy Valley. The book, which teaches geography based on his experience and involves people with special needs in the creative process, was distributed at Penn State games.
