= Jesse Arnelle =

American basketball player and attorney (1933–2020)

Personal information
- Born: December 30, 1933 New Rochelle, New York, U.S.
- Died: October 21, 2020 (aged 86) San Francisco, California, U.S.
- Listed height: 6 ft 8 in (2.03 m)
- Listed weight: 190 lb (86 kg)

Career information
- High school: New Rochelle (New Rochelle, New York)
- College: Penn State (1951–1955)
- NBA draft: 1955: 2nd round, 13th overall pick
- Drafted by: Fort Wayne Pistons
- Playing career: 1955–1956
- Position: Power forward
- Number: 18, 15

Career history
- 1955–1956: Fort Wayne Pistons

Career highlights
- Third-team All-American – Collier's (1955)

Career NBA statistics
- Points: 147
- Rebounds: 170
- Assists: 18
- Stats at NBA.com
- Stats at Basketball Reference

Hugh Jesse Arnelle (December 30, 1933 – October 21, 2020) was an American basketball player and attorney.

== Athletics ==
Born in New Rochelle, New York, Arnelle played football and basketball for Penn State University. He led the basketball team to the 1954 NCAA Final Four. He was named an All-American that season. Arnelle was also named to the 1954 NCAA All-Tournament team and the East Regional Most Valuable Player. Arnelle finished his Penn State basketball career as the program's all-time leading scorer and rebounder with 2,138 points and 1,238 rebounds.

He was drafted by the Los Angeles Rams in the 1955 NFL draft, but chose to instead play in the NBA. He was selected by the Fort Wayne Pistons in the 2nd round (15th pick overall) of the 1955 NBA draft. He played for the 1955-56 Pistons in 31 games, averaging 4.7 ppg and 5.5 rpg, before breaking his nose in February 1956, ending his rookie season. His NBA career did not continue afterward.

== Law and business ==
After professional basketball, Arnelle spent time in the United States Air Force and the Peace Corps. He graduated from Dickinson Law School in 1962, and in 1969 he moved to San Francisco and took the California bar exam. Once licensed to practice law in 1971, Arnelle worked as a trial lawyer in the public defenders office.

In 1987, Arnelle teamed with William Hastie to form the law firm of Arnelle & Hastie, San Francisco, (which later became Arnelle, Hastie, McGee, Willis and Green). He would serve as senior partner until his retirement from law in 1997. Black Enterprise magazine named Arnelle & Hastie one of the top 12 black law firms in the country in 1987. He was also Of Counsel to the law firm of Womble Carlyle Sandridge & Rice from 1997 to 2005.

Arnelle has served on the board of directors of URS Corp. since January 2004. Prior to that, he was on the boards of the Metropolitan Life Series Fund, Textron Corporation, Eastman Chemical Company, Gannett Company, Waste Management, Inc, Armstrong World Industries, Wells Fargo, and Florida Power & Light.

== Personal ==
Arnelle became Penn State's first black student body president in 1955. He was elected to the university's Board of Trustees in 1969 and has since served the university in many roles, including the President's club, the Penn State Renaissance Fund, the Campaign Steering Committee and Penn State's National Development Council. He received the Lion's Paw award, given to distinguished alumni, in June 2000.

Arnelle died on October 21, 2020, at age 86.

== Career statistics ==
Legend
GP	Games played	GS	Games started	MPG	Minutes per game
FG%	Field goal percentage	3P%	3-point field goal percentage	FT%	Free throw percentage
RPG	Rebounds per game	APG	Assists per game	SPG	Steals per game
BPG	Blocks per game	PPG	Points per game	**Bold**	Career high

=== NBA ===
==== Regular season ====
Year	Team	GP	MPG	FG%	FT%	RPG	APG	PPG
1955–56	Fort Wayne	31	13.2	.317	.623	5.5	.6	4.7

== See also ==
- List of NCAA Division I men's basketball players with 2000 points and 1000 rebounds
