= Mike Watkins (basketball) =

American basketball player

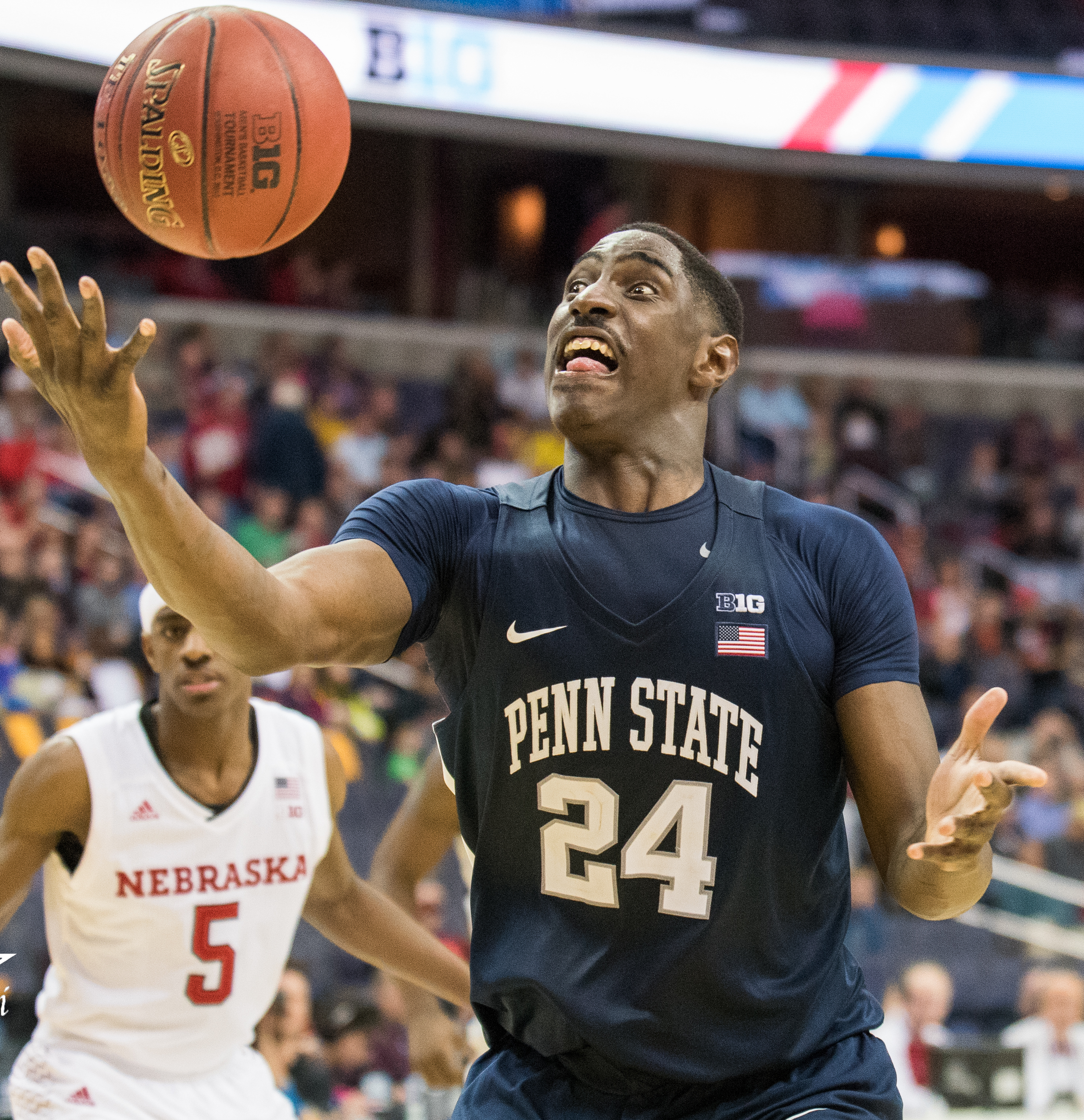
- Watkins with Penn State in 2017

No. 24 – Sagesse SC
- Position: Center / power forward
- League: Lebanese Basketball League

Personal information
- Born: August 10, 1995 (age 31) Philadelphia, Pennsylvania, U.S.
- Listed height: 6 ft 9 in (2.06 m)
- Listed weight: 254 lb (115 kg)

Career information
- High school: MCSCS (Philadelphia, Pennsylvania); Phelps (Malvern, Pennsylvania)
- College: Penn State (2016–2020)
- NBA draft: 2021: undrafted
- Playing career: 2020–present

Career history
- 2020: Caribbean Storm Islands
- 2021: Metros de Santiago
- 2021: Titanes de Miramar
- 2021: Hapoel Haifa
- 2024: Delaware Blue Coats
- 2024: Piratas de La Guaira
- 2024: Soles de Mexicali
- 2024–2025: NLEX Road Warriors
- 2025: CS Antonine
- 2025: Indios de San Francisco de Macorís
- 2025: Al-Ittihad Jeddah
- 2026: Changsha Yongsheng
- 2026: Spartans Distrito Capital
- 2026: Homenetmen Beirut
- 2026–present: Sagesse SC

Career highlights
- NIT champion (2018); Big Ten All-Defensive Team (2018)

Michael Alphonso Griffin-Watkins (born August 10, 1995) is an American professional basketball player for Sagesse SC of the Lebanese Basketball League. He played college basketball player for the Penn State Nittany Lions and was named to the Big Ten All-Defensive team in 2018.

== High school career ==
Watkins first attended Mathematics, Civics and Sciences Charter School in Philadelphia, Pennsylvania. During his junior year at MCSCS he reached the 2014 Pennsylvania Interscholastic Athletic Association tournament championship game, racking up 17 points, 17 rebounds, and 5 blocks in a runner-up finish to Lincoln Park. He averaged 11.0 points, 12.5 rebounds, and 5.0 blocks during a junior campaign in which he totaled 17 double-doubles.

Watkins transferred to The Phelps School, an all-boys college preparatory school located in Malvern, Pennsylvania, in his senior year. Watkins averaged 14 points, 11 rebounds, and 6.5 blocks per game during his final high school season, and helped The Phelps School win a state championship.

=== Recruiting ===
Rated as a 4-star recruit and the 3rd-best recruit from Pennsylvania in the class of 2015 by ESPN.com, Watkins was ranked no. 89 in his class by ESPN. He signed with Penn State on November 13, 2014, as part of the best recruiting class in school history.

College recruiting
Name	Hometown	School	Height	Weight	Commit date
Mike Watkins; C	Philadelphia, PA	The Phelps School (PA)	6 ft 8 in (2.03 m)	210 lb (95 kg)	Jun 12, 2013
Mike Watkins; C	Recruit ratings: Scout: Rivals: 247Sports: ESPN: (82)				
Overall recruit ranking: Scout: 87 Rivals: 90 247Sports: 96 ESPN: 90
Note: In many cases, Scout, Rivals, 247Sports, On3, and ESPN may conflict in their listings of height and weight.; In these cases, the average was taken. ESPN grades are on a 100-point scale.; Sources:

== College career ==
Watkins redshirted his first year. His redshirt freshman season Watkins averaged just over 8 points per game playing in 33 games starting 24 of the games. He was twice named Big Ten Freshman of the Week, on December 19, 2016, and January 16, 2017.

In his sophomore season, Watkins averaged 12.1 points, 8.9 rebounds, and 2.3 blocks per contest. He had a 22-point, 11 rebounds, and 7 block performance in a late loss to Wisconsin. Watkins was named to the All-Big Ten Defensive Team.

Watkins played 27 games as a junior before suffering a season-ending leg injury against Michigan in February 2018. He averaged 7.8 points, 7.4 rebounds (9th in the Big Ten), and 1.5 blocks per game (8th). Watkins scored his 1,000th point against Central Connecticut State on December 23, 2019. On February 11, 2020, Watkins scored a season-high 19 points in an 88–76 win against Purdue. He was suspended for the final game of the season versus Northwestern for a violation of team rules, which was later revealed to be a DUI arrest.

As a senior in 2019–20, Watkins averaged 9.7 points, 7.6 rebounds (10th in the Big Ten), and 2.2 blocked shots per game (3rd).

== Professional career ==
On September 30, 2020, Watkins signed his first contract, with Cimarrones del Choco of the Baloncesto Profesional Colombiano.

In 2021–22, Watkins was playing forward and center for Hapoel Haifa in the Israeli Basketball Premier League.

On October 29, 2023, Watkins joined the Delaware Blue Coats, but was waived on November 6. On March 22, 2024, he re-joined the Blue Coats.

On April 13, 2024, Watkins signed with the Piratas de La Guaira of the Superliga Profesional de Baloncesto.

On November 25, 2024, Watkins signed with the NLEX Road Warriors of the Philippine Basketball Association (PBA) as the team's import for the 2024–25 PBA Commissioner's Cup.

== Career statistics ==
Legend
GP	Games played	GS	Games started	MPG	Minutes per game
FG%	Field goal percentage	3P%	3-point field goal percentage	FT%	Free throw percentage
RPG	Rebounds per game	APG	Assists per game	SPG	Steals per game
BPG	Blocks per game	PPG	Points per game	**Bold**	Career high

=== College ===
Year	Team	GP	GS	MPG	FG%	3P%	FT%	RPG	APG	SPG	BPG	PPG
2015–16	Penn State	Redshirt										
2016–17	Penn State	**33**	24	23.8	.590	–	**.643**	8.1	.6	.8	**2.7**	9.7
2017–18	Penn State	29	**28**	**26.3**	**.685**	.000	.611	**8.9**	**.7**	**1.0**	2.3	**12.1**
2018–19	Penn State	27	14	20.8	.561	–	.447	7.4	.5	.6	1.5	7.8
2019–20	Penn State	30	17	21.0	.545	.000	.565	7.6	.5	.8	2.2	9.7
Career		119	83	23.0	.597	.000	.573	8.0	.6	.8	2.2	9.8

== Personal life ==
Watkins is the fourth-oldest among eight children of Alphonso Griffin and Rebecca Watkins.

Watkins suffered from depression and bipolar disorder and in June 2018 Watkins was hospitalized after having suicidal thoughts. Watkins was charged with disorderly conduct on October 1, 2017. According to State College police, Watkins punched a man in the face on September 29, 2017, after being confronted about cutting to the front of the line at McDonald's. Watkins was also charged with possession of marijuana paraphernalia in June 2017 and charged for smashing a window at Baby's Burgers and Shakes in Downtown State College in September 2016. Since these charges Watkins has apologized saying "Sorry I have brought negative attention to Penn State University..."
