= Ace Baldwin Jr. =

American basketball player (born 2001)

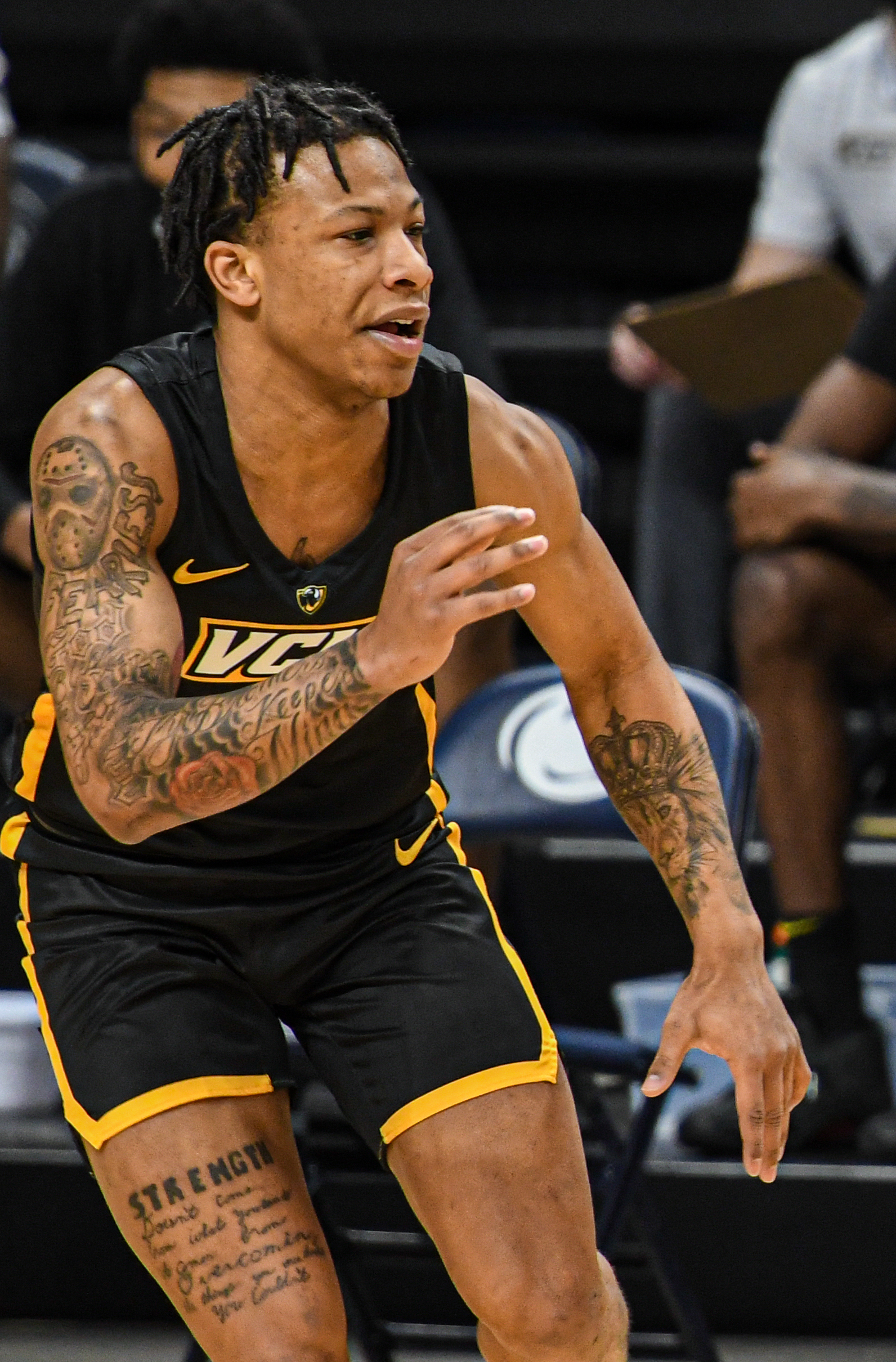
- Baldwin with VCU in 2020

No. 1 – Osceola Magic
- Position: Point guard
- League: NBA G League

Personal information
- Born: June 7, 2001 (age 25) Baltimore, Maryland, U.S.
- Listed height: 6 ft 1 in (1.85 m)
- Listed weight: 190 lb (86 kg)

Career information
- High school: Saint Frances Academy (Baltimore, Maryland)
- College: VCU (2020–2023); Penn State (2023–2025)
- NBA draft: 2025: undrafted
- Playing career: 2025–present

Career history
- 2025–present: Osceola Magic

Career highlights
- Atlantic 10 Player of the Year (2023); 2× Big Ten Defensive Player of the Year (2024, 2025); Atlantic 10 Defensive Player of the Year (2023); First-team All-Atlantic 10 (2023); Second-team All-Atlantic 10 (2022); Third-team All-Big Ten (2024); 2× Big Ten All-Defensive Team (2024, 2025)
- Stats at NBA.com
- Stats at Basketball Reference

Adrian Tyrone "Ace" Baldwin Jr. (born June 7, 2001) is an American professional basketball player for the Osceola Magic of the NBA G League. He played college basketball for the VCU Rams and Penn State Nittany Lions.

== Early life and high school career ==
Baldwin grew up in Baltimore and attended Saint Frances Academy. His nickname, "Ace", was given to him as a baby, a reference to the film Paid in Full. He was named the Metro Player of the Year after averaging 14 points, six assists, four rebounds, and four steals per game during his junior season. Baldwin repeated as the co-Player of the Year as a senior. He was rated a four-star recruit and committed to playing college basketball for VCU over offers from Virginia, Villanova, Georgetown, Maryland, Kansas State, and Seton Hall.

== College career ==
Baldwin started all 26 of the VCU Rams' games during his freshman season and averaged 6.7 points, 4.4 assists, and 3.2 rebounds per game. Following a 19-7 regular season, Baldwin's VCU team clinched an at-large berth in the NCAA Tournament, but forfeited following a COVID-19 outbreak on the team.

The start to Baldwin's sophomore season was delayed due to a ruptured Achilles tendon suffered in the offseason. He returned in December and was named second-team All-Atlantic 10 Conference after averaging 11.4 points, 5.5 assists, and 2.5 steals per game.

As a junior, Baldwin averaged 12.7 points, 5.8 assists, and 2.2 steals per game. On February 3, 2023, Baldwin notched a career high 37 points in a 73-65 victory over Saint Louis. On March 12, 2023, Baldwin scored 16 points and notched 7 assists in the Atlantic 10 Championship game, in which VCU defeated Dayton 68-56. He scored 13 points in his first and only NCAA Tournament game, a 63-51 loss to Saint Mary's.

He was named the Atlantic 10 Player of the Year, the Atlantic 10 Defensive Player of the Year, and first-team All-Atlantic 10. Baldwin entered the NCAA transfer portal after the season following the departure of VCU head coach Mike Rhoades.

On April 9, 2023, Baldwin announced that he would be transferring to Penn State for his senior season, joining his former coach Mike Rhoades. As a senior, Baldwin averaged 14.2 points, 6.0 assists, 2.1 rebounds, and 2.7 steals per game. On January 10, 2024, Baldwin set a career-high and tied a Penn State record with eight steals in a 76-72 loss to Northwestern. Following the regular season, Baldwin was named the Big Ten Defensive Player of the Year, and a semifinalist for the Naismith National Defensive Player of the Year.

== Professional career ==
On September 23, 2026, Baldwin signed an Exhibit 10 contract with the Orlando Magic, but was waived by the team the same day.

== Career statistics ==
Legend
GP	Games played	GS	Games started	MPG	Minutes per game
FG%	Field goal percentage	3P%	3-point field goal percentage	FT%	Free throw percentage
RPG	Rebounds per game	APG	Assists per game	SPG	Steals per game
BPG	Blocks per game	PPG	Points per game	**Bold**	Career high

=== College ===
Year	Team	GP	GS	MPG	FG%	3P%	FT%	RPG	APG	SPG	BPG	PPG
2020–21	VCU	26	26	29.9	.372	.260	.769	3.2	4.4	2.1	.0	6.7
2021–22	VCU	24	24	33.5	.417	**.413**	.743	**3.5**	5.5	**2.5**	**.2**	11.4
2022–23	VCU	**30**	**30**	**34.9**	**.421**	.342	**.795**	2.9	**5.8**	2.2	.1	**12.7**
2023–24	Penn State											
Career		80	80	32.8	.408	.347	.774	3.2	5.2	2.3	.1	10.4

== See also ==
- List of NCAA Division I men's basketball career steals leaders
