= Jordan Dickerson =

American professional basketball player

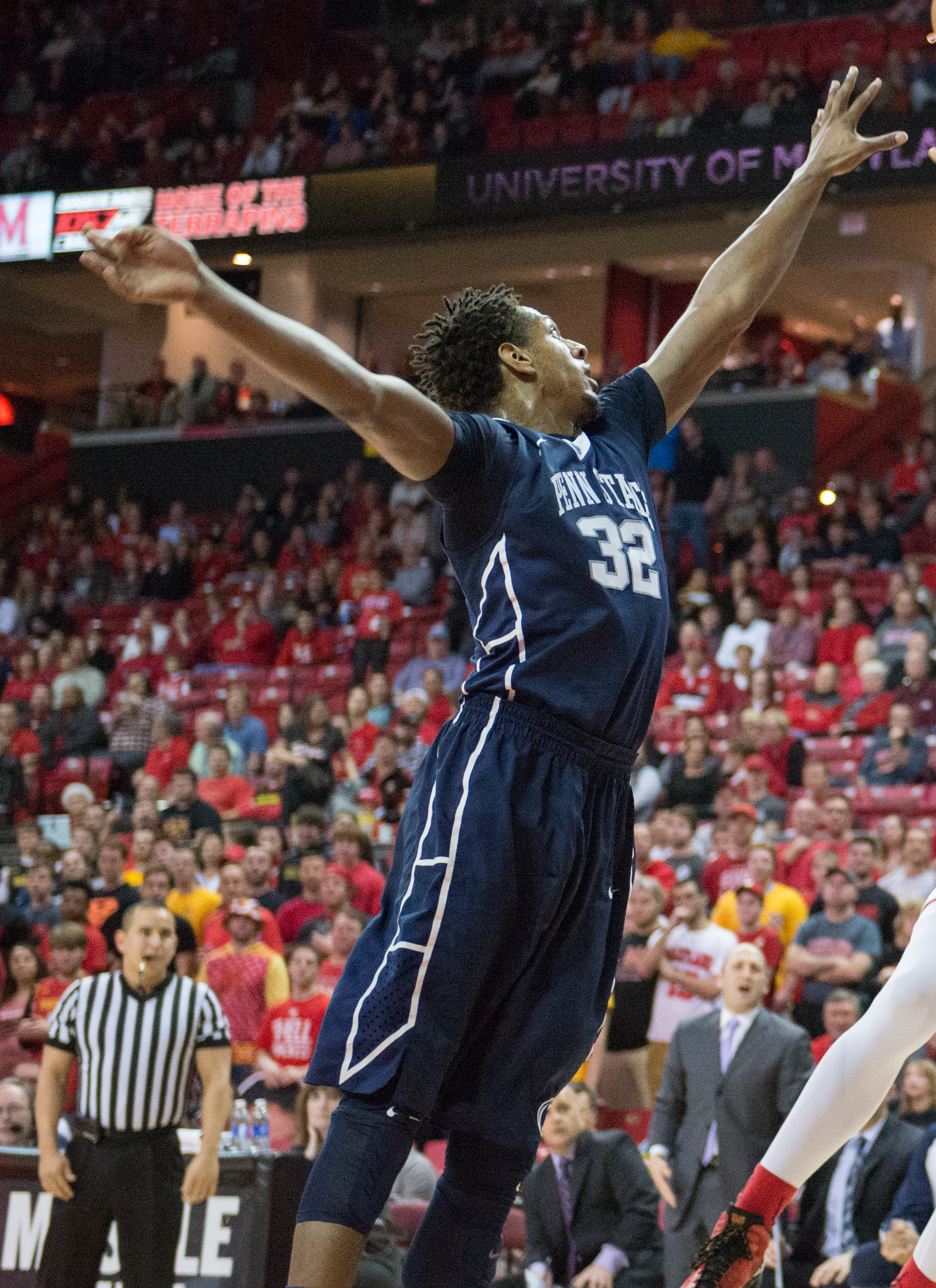

Free agent
- Position: Center

Personal information
- Born: June 9, 1993 (age 33) New York City, New York, U.S.
- Listed height: 7 ft 1 in (2.16 m)
- Listed weight: 245 lb (111 kg)

Career information
- High school: Abraham Lincoln (Brooklyn, New York)
- College: SMU (2012–2013); Penn State (2013–2016)
- NBA draft: 2016: undrafted
- Playing career: 2016–present

Career history
- 2016: Bashkimi Prizren
- 2016–2017: Promitheas Patras
- 2017: Koroivos
- 2018: BC Batumi

Jordan Dickerson (born June 9, 1993) is an American professional basketball player who last played for BC Batumi of the Georgian Superliga. Standing at 2.16 metres (7 feet 1 inch), he plays at the center position. After playing one year of college basketball at SMU and three years at Penn State, Dickerson entered the 2016 NBA draft, but he was not selected in the draft's two rounds.

== Professional career ==
After going undrafted in the 2016 NBA draft, Dickerson joined Bashkimi Prizren of the ETC Superliga. On December, he left Bashkimi and joined Promitheas Patras of the Greek Basket League.

On October 2, 2017, Dickerson joined Koroivos of the Greek Basket League. His monthly contract was not renewed at first but one day later he signed another monthly contract. He ultimately left the team on December 29 of the same year.
