= Ross Travis =

American football player (born 1993)

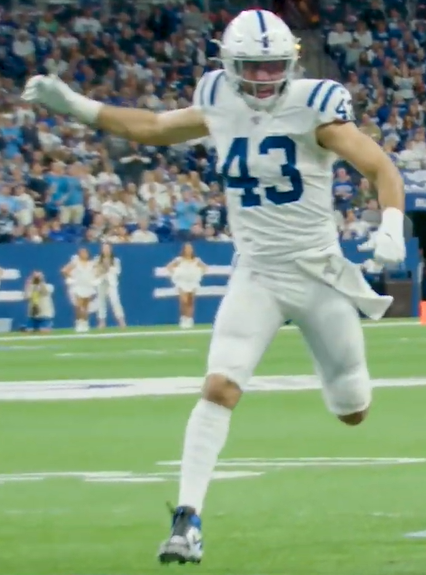
- Travis with the Indianapolis Colts in 2019

No. 88, 43, 86
- Position: Tight end

Personal information
- Born: January 9, 1993 (age 33); Chaska, Minnesota, U.S.
- Listed height: 6 ft 7 in (2.01 m)
- Listed weight: 235 lb (107 kg)

Career information
- High school: Chaska
- College: Penn State
- NFL draft: 2015: undrafted

Career history
- Kansas City Chiefs (2015–2017); Indianapolis Colts (2017–2019); New York Jets (2019–2020); Arizona Cardinals (2021); Cleveland Browns (2021)*; Detroit Lions (2021)
- * Offseason or practice squad member only

Career NFL statistics
- Receptions: 14
- Receiving yards: 142
- Stats at Pro Football Reference

Ross John Travis (born January 9, 1993) is an American former professional football player who was a tight end in the National Football League (NFL). He played college basketball for the Penn State Nittany Lions and did not play college football. After going undrafted in the 2015 NFL draft, he signed with the Kansas City Chiefs as an undrafted free agent.

== College basketball career ==
Travis was rated as a three-star recruit by ESPN and Rivals and was considered one of the top college prospects in Minnesota. As a freshman, he played all 32 games starting 16, he averaged 4.4 points and 4.7 rebounds per game in his first year. He won the team's Scrappiest Player Award which is voted by teammates and coaches. In his final three years at Penn State University, Travis averaged 7.0, 8.3, and 5.5 points per game as a sophomore, junior and senior. He finished his career with the Nittany Lions as a four-year letterman and played a career total of 133 games and started 98.

== Professional career ==
=== Kansas City Chiefs ===
Having not played football since freshman year of high school eight years prior, Travis was signed to the Kansas City Chiefs' practice squad as an undrafted free agent on September 7, 2015. He was released by the Chiefs on September 14, but was re-signed on November 17. Travis re-signed with the Chiefs on January 18, 2016.

On November 27, 2017, Travis was waived by the Chiefs.

=== Indianapolis Colts ===
On November 28, 2017, Travis was claimed off waivers by the Indianapolis Colts. In his Colts debut, Travis had two catches for 33 yards.

On August 30, 2018, in the last preseason game against the Cincinnati Bengals, Travis suffered a torn ACL after catching a pass from quarterback P. J. Walker for a first down on 4th & 6, prematurely ending his 2018 season. On September 1, Travis was officially placed on injured reserve.

On February 26, 2019, Travis was re-signed by the Colts. He was released on August 31. Travis was re-signed on November 25, but was waived on December 27.

=== New York Jets ===
On December 28, 2019, Travis was claimed off waivers by the New York Jets.

On September 5, 2020, Travis was released by the Jets and signed to the practice squad the next day. He was elevated to the active roster on November 9 for the team's week 9 game against the New England Patriots, and reverted to the practice squad after the game. He was placed on the practice squad/COVID-19 list by the team on November 12, and restored to the practice squad on November 23. He was promoted to the active roster on November 24.

=== Arizona Cardinals ===
On May 25, 2021, Travis signed with the Arizona Cardinals. He was released on August 31, and re-signed to the practice squad the next day. He was released on November 2.

=== Cleveland Browns ===
On December 7, 2021, Travis was signed to the Cleveland Browns' practice squad. He was released on December 24.

=== Detroit Lions ===
On December 28, 2021, Travis was signed to the Detroit Lions' practice squad.

== Personal life ==
Travis' cousin, Jalen, plays in the NFL for the Indianapolis Colts.
