= Josh Reaves =

Bolivian-American basketball player (born 1997)

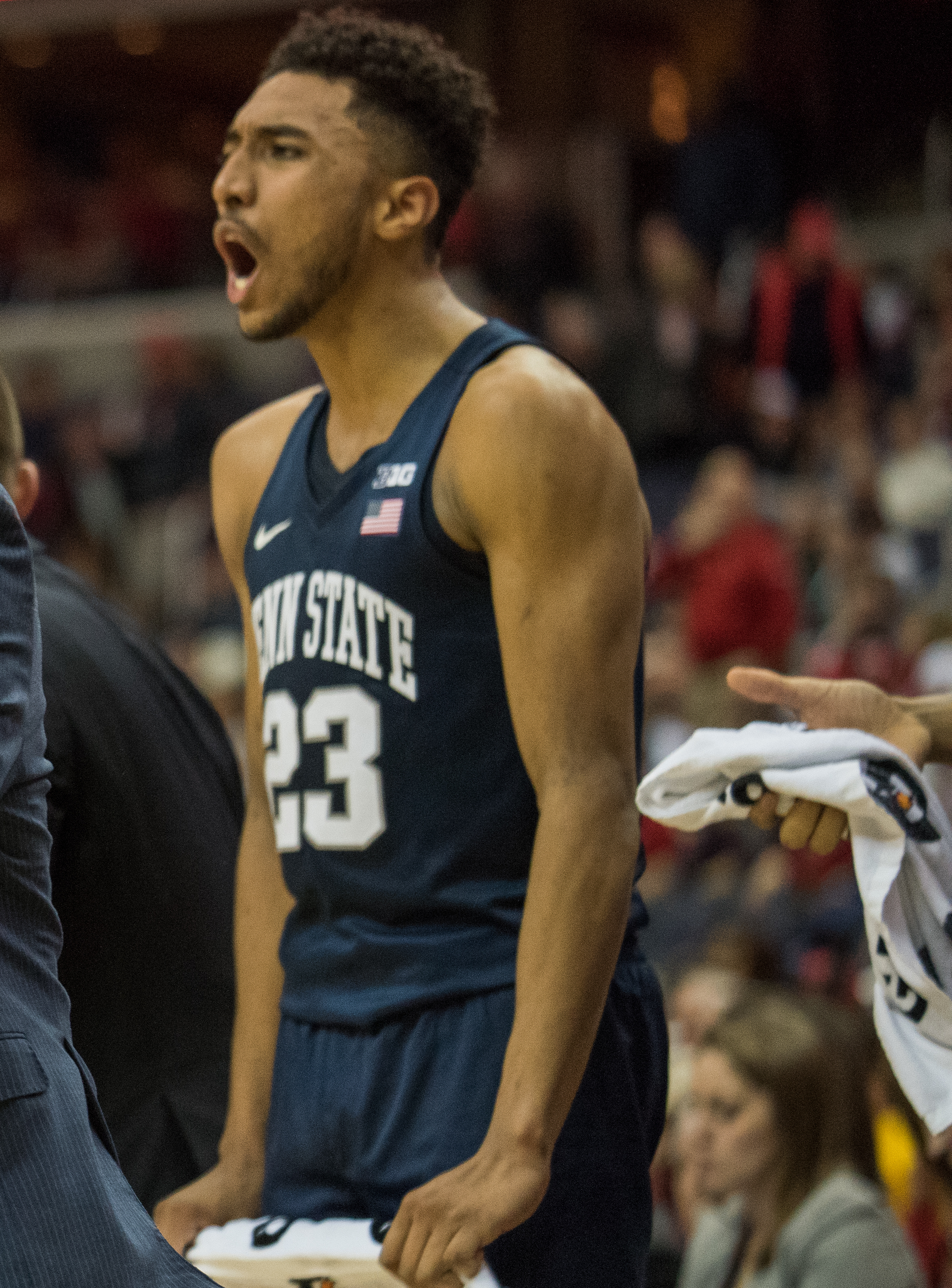
- Reaves with Penn State in 2017

Free agent
- Position: Shooting guard

Personal information
- Born: June 4, 1997 (age 29) Fairfax, Virginia, U.S.
- Listed height: 6 ft 4 in (1.93 m)
- Listed weight: 214 lb (97 kg)

Career information
- High school: Paul VI Catholic (Fairfax, Virginia); Oak Hill Academy (Mouth of Wilson, Virginia)
- College: Penn State (2015–2019)
- NBA draft: 2019: undrafted
- Playing career: 2019–present

Career history
- 2019–2020: Dallas Mavericks
- 2019–2020: →Texas Legends
- 2021: Rio Grande Valley Vipers
- 2021–2022: Beşiktaş Icrypex
- 2022: Tofaş
- 2022–2025: Rio Grande Valley Vipers
- 2026: Paisas

Career highlights
- NIT champion (2018); Big Ten Defensive Player of the Year (2019); 2× Big Ten All-Defensive Team (2018, 2019)
- Stats at NBA.com
- Stats at Basketball Reference

Joshua Alexander Reaves (born June 4, 1997) is a Bolivian-American professional basketball player who last played for the Paisas of the Baloncesto Profesional Colombiano. He played college basketball for the Penn State Nittany Lions.

== Early life ==
Reaves was born and grew up in Fairfax, Virginia. He and his older brother were raised in a single parent household by his Bolivian-born mother, Liset Bravo Reaves, after his father died when he was six years old. He initially attended Middleburg Academy with Mo Alie-Cox, later transferring to Paul VI Catholic High School, where he played both basketball and soccer. As a junior, Reaves was named team captain and averaged 12.6 points per game and was named All-Washington Metro Area as the Panthers won the Washington Catholic Athletic Conference, VISAA Division I State championship, and the Alhambra Catholic Invitational. Reaves transferred to Oak Hill Academy before his senior year. Ranked the 74th-best recruit in the nation and second in state by ESPN.com, Reaves committed to play college basketball at Penn State over offers from Temple, Villanova, Maryland, VCU and Georgetown. He was named Oak Hill's captain as the team went 47–1 and was ranked seventh nationally by MaxPreps in his only season.

== College career ==
Reaves played four seasons as a member of the Penn State Nittany Lions. He started 20 games as a freshman and appeared in six more off the bench, despite missing time due to a bout with Mononucleosis, averaging 6.4 points, 3.6 rebounds, 1.3 steals and 0.9 blocks. As a sophomore, Reaves averaged 7.7 points and four rebounds per game while leading the Big Ten with 2.14 steals per game (16th-best in the nation). In his junior season, Reaves averaged 10.6 points, 5.1 reboundsand 3.2 assists per game and again led the Big Ten with 2.18 steals per game and was named to the Big Ten All-Defensive Team. He was named the Big Ten Defensive Player of the Year, All-Defensive Team, and honorable mention all-conference as a senior after averaging 10.6 points, five rebounds, 2.9 assists and 1.0 blocks per game and leading the Big Ten for the third straight season with 2.5 steals per game. Reaves finished his collegiate career with 1,079 career points, 540 rebounds, 310 assists and 92 shots blocked and set the school record with 250 steals. Following the end of his senior season, Reaves was invited to play in the Portsmouth Invitational Tournament, where he was named to the All-Tournament team.

== Professional career ==
=== Dallas Mavericks (2019–2020) ===
After going unselected in the 2019 NBA draft, Reaves was named to the Dallas Mavericks Summer League roster and averaged 12.6 points, 4.8 rebounds, 2.4 assists, 1.2 steals and one block per game over five games. Reaves signed a two-way contract with the Mavericks on July 29, 2019. Reaves made his NBA debut on January 2, 2020, playing the final minute of the 123–111 win against the Brooklyn Nets. On August 10, in a 122–114 victory against the Utah Jazz, Reaves made his first career field goal scoring a layup on a backdoor cut, and also had his first career rebound and assist; he finished the game with 4 points on 2 of 4 shooting from the field, 1 rebound, and 3 assists in 14 minutes of playing time.

=== Rio Grande Valley Vipers (2021) ===
On December 19, 2020, Reaves signed with the Houston Rockets, but was waived on the same day and on January 18, 2021, he signed with the Rio Grande Valley Vipers. Reaves played in each of the Vipers' 15 games in the COVID-shortened 2020–21 season, averaging 12 points, 2.7 assists, and 4.4 rebounds per game. Reaves scored 7 points in 28 minutes in the Vipers' 110-81 G League Quarterfinal loss to the Santa Cruz Warriors.

=== Beşiktaş (2021–2022) ===
On July 5, 2021, Reaves signed with Beşiktaş Icrypex of the Basketbol Süper Ligi (BSL) in Turkey. Reaves played in 23 games for Beşiktaş, averaging 5.0 points, 1.3 assists, and 2.1 rebounds per game. Beşiktaş went 15-15 and failed to qualify for the BSL playoffs.

=== Tofaş (2022) ===
On September 13, 2022, Reaves signed with Tofaş of the Basketbol Süper Ligi (BSL). On October 26, Tofaş announced that it had parted ways with Reaves by mutual agreement. Reaves did not appear in any league games for Tofaş.

=== Return to Rio Grande (2022–2025) ===
On November 3, 2022, Reaves was named to the opening night roster for the Rio Grande Valley Vipers. Reaves played in 14 games for the Vipers in the 2022–23 regular season, averaging 7.4 points, 2.7 assists, and 2.9 rebounds per game. He played in all five of the team's playoff games, including a total of 9 points in the G-League Finals, which the Vipers lost in two games to the Delaware Blue Coats.

== Bolivia national team ==
Reaves plays for the Bolivian national team where he has been the key player.

At the 2023 FIBA Basketball World Cup qualification (Americas), he led Bolivia in points, assists, steals and blocks.

== Career statistics ==
Legend
GP	Games played	GS	Games started	MPG	Minutes per game
FG%	Field goal percentage	3P%	3-point field goal percentage	FT%	Free throw percentage
RPG	Rebounds per game	APG	Assists per game	SPG	Steals per game
BPG	Blocks per game	PPG	Points per game	**Bold**	Career high

=== NBA ===
==== Regular season ====
Year	Team	GP	GS	MPG	FG%	3P%	FT%	RPG	APG	SPG	BPG	PPG
2019–20	Dallas	4	0	7.0	.333	.000	1.000	.8	.8	0	0	2.0
Career		4	0	7.0	.333	.000	1.000	.8	.8	0	0	2.0

==== Playoffs ====
Year	Team	GP	GS	MPG	FG%	3P%	FT%	RPG	APG	SPG	BPG	PPG
2020	Dallas	2	0	4.5	.333	.000	1.000	1.0	.5	.0	.5	2.0
Career		2	0	4.5	.333	.000	1.000	1.0	.5	.0	.5	2.0

=== College statistics ===
Year	Team	GP	GS	MPG	FG%	3P%	FT%	RPG	APG	SPG	BPG	PPG
2015–16	Penn State	27	20	23.0	.375	.077	**.756**	3.6	1.9	1.3	.9	6.1
2016–17	Penn State	28	23	27.1	.448	.322	.708	4.0	2.1	2.1	.8	7.7
2017–18	Penn State	**34**	**32**	30.8	**.487**	**.377**	.707	**5.1**	**3.1**	2.2	.5	**10.6**
2018–19	Penn State	32	**32**	**33.0**	.426	.356	.656	5.0	2.9	**2.5**	**1.0**	**10.6**
Career		121	107	28.8	.438	.324	.702	4.5	2.6	2.1	.8	8.9

== Personal ==
Reaves has dual American and Bolivian citizenship due to his mother being from Bolivia. His uncle played soccer professionally. He is the first Bolivian to play in the NBA. His older brother, Michael, played college football at Shepherd University.
