= The Phelps School =

Location
- 583 Sugartown Road; Malvern, Chester County, Pennsylvania 19355-2800; United States; 40°01′27″N 75°31′08″W

Information
- School type: Independent boarding school
- Motto: Latin: Veritas sine timore (Truth without fear)
- Religious affiliation: Nonsectarian
- Established: 1946
- Founder: Norman T. Phelps
- Status: Currently operational
- CEEB code: 392370
- NCES School ID: 01199159
- President: Stephany Phelps Fahey
- Chair: Norman T. Phelps
- Head of school: Jack Hasler
- Faculty: 15.0 (on an FTE basis)
- Grades: 6–12
- Gender: All-boys
- Enrollment: 82 (2021-2022)
  - Grade 6: 2
  - Grade 7: 3
  - Grade 8: 5
  - Grade 9: 10
  - Grade 10: 15
  - Grade 11: 22
  - Grade 12: 25
- Student to teacher ratio: 1:5.5
- Hours in school day: 7.2
- Campus type: Suburban
- Nickname: Lions
- Accreditations: NAIS
- Budget: $3.5 million
- Annual tuition: $57,000
- Revenue: $3.6 million
- Website: thephelpsschool.org

The Phelps School is an independent, all-boys boarding school in Malvern, Pennsylvania, United States.

== Athletics ==
Phelps won the 2015 Pennsylvania Independent Schools Athletic Association (PAISAA) boys basketball championship. Phelps also won the 2025 Pennsylvania Independent Schools Athletic Association (PAISAA) boys basketball championship.

== Notable alumni ==
- Matthew Mellon (1982), businessman
- Kyle Vinales (2011), basketball player who plays professionally in Puerto Rico
- Terry Larrier (2014), basketball player who played professionally overseas
- Quincy McKnight (2015), basketball player who played professionally in Bosnia and Herzegovina
- Mike Watkins (2016), basketball player who plays professionally in the Philippines
- Will Riley (2024), basketball player for Illinois Fighting Illini men's basketball
