= Talor Battle =

American basketball player/coach

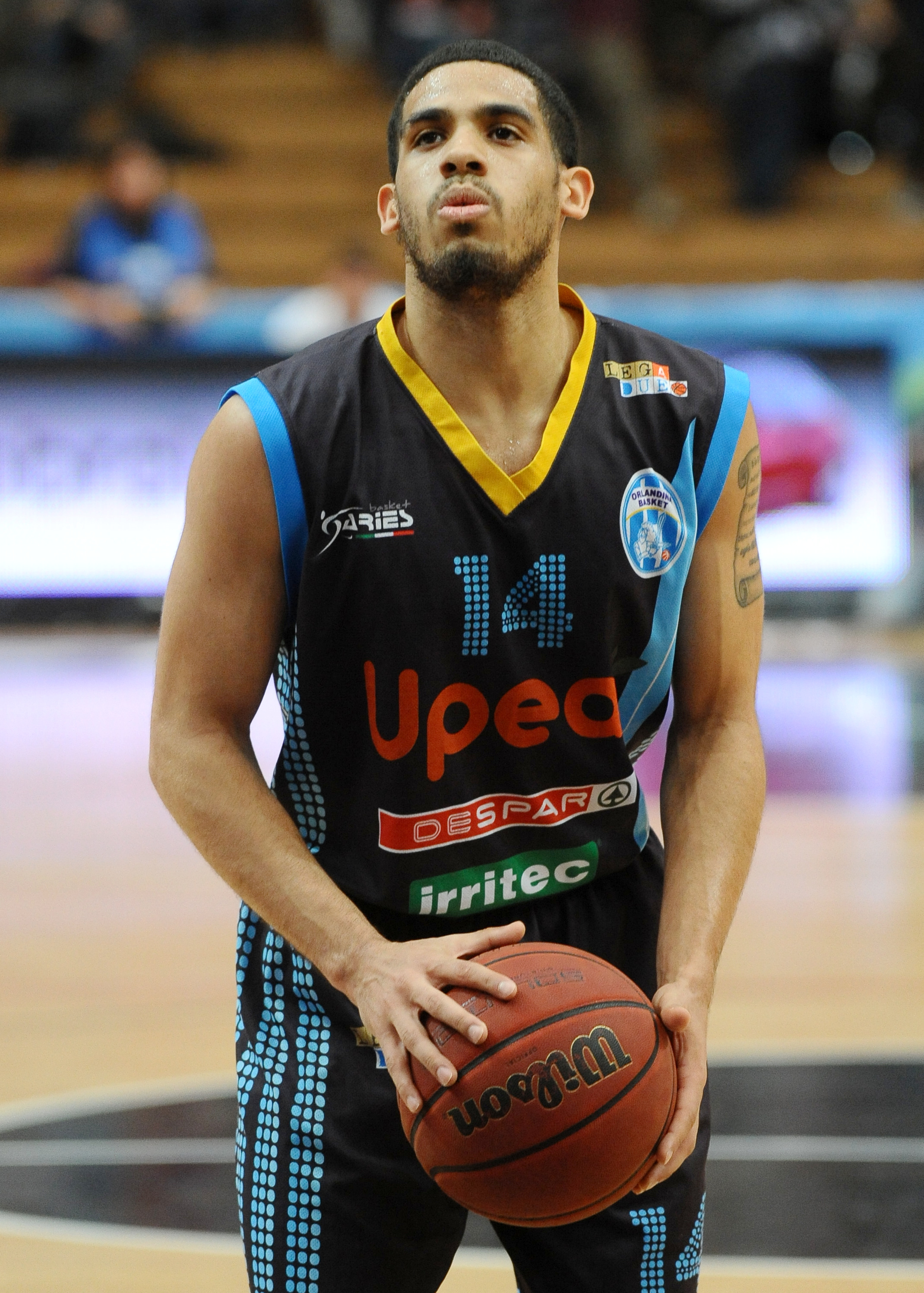

Penn State Nittany Lions
- Title: Assistant coach
- League: Big Ten Conference

Personal information
- Born: September 16, 1988 (age 38) Albany, New York, U.S.
- Listed height: 6 ft 0 in (1.83 m)
- Listed weight: 170 lb (77 kg)

Career information
- High school: Bishop Maginn (Albany, New York)
- College: Penn State (2007–2011)
- NBA draft: 2011: undrafted
- Playing career: 2011–2018
- Position: Point guard
- Coaching career: 2020–present

Career history

Playing
- 2011: Cholet Basket
- 2011–2012: Telekom Baskets Bonn
- 2012–2013: Orlandina Basket
- 2013–2015: Belfius Mons-Hainaut
- 2015–2016: Hapoel Tel Aviv
- 2017: Atomerőmű SE
- 2017–2018: Petrol Olimpija

Coaching
- 2020–2021: Penn State (assistant)
- 2021–2024: Northwestern (assistant)
- 2024–2025: Ohio State (assistant)
- 2025-present: Penn State (assistant)

Career highlights
- Slovenian Supercup winner (2017); Belgian League Star of the Coaches (2014); First-team All-Big Ten (2009); First-team All-Big Ten – Media (2011); Second-team All-Big Ten (2010); Second-team All-Big Ten – Coaches (2011)
Medals
Men's basketball
Representing United States
Summer Universiade
Bronze medal – third place	2009 Belgrade	Team competition

Talor Battle (born September 16, 1988) is an American former professional basketball player and current assistant coach for Penn State. In college, he played for Penn State Nittany Lions men's basketball team, and then re-joined the Nittany Lions program as an assistant coach during the 2020–2021 season. He is from Albany, New York, and attended Bishop Maginn High School. On May 10, 2021 it was announced that Battle would join Northwestern as an assistant basketball coach, joining the team alongside his half-brother Boo Buie, who was playing for Northwestern at the time.

== High school career ==
As a senior Battle averaged 28.7 points, 5.9 assists, 5.2 rebounds and 4.3 steals per game as he led Bishop Maginn to the Class AA state title game. He was rated a top 100 recruit in the ESPN 150, the No. 131 recruit in the nation by Rivals.com and No. 21 among point-guards by Scout.com. Battle ended his career as the fifth leading scorer all-time in New York Section II history with 2,161 points. He played AAU for the Albany City Rocks alongside former NBA guard Jimmer Fredette and Mark Domaracki. He has a half brother named Taran Buie who attended Penn State and another half brother Boo Buie who played at Northwestern from 2019 through 2024, for whom Battle was an assistant coach there from 2021 to 2024. Buie also attended Bishop Maginn.

== College career ==
Battle attended Penn State. A first-team All-Big Ten and All-Region selection as a sophomore, Talor Battle established himself as one of the top scoring and playmaking threats in the Big Ten and was the undisputed on-court leader of the Nittany Lions. Coming off one of the best statistical seasons in Nittany Lion history in leading Penn State to a school-record 27 wins and the 2009 NIT title. On February 24, 2011, Battle became the first player in Big Ten Conference history to accumulate 2,000 career points, 500 career rebounds, and 500 career assists. On March 10, 2011, Battle became Penn State's all-time leading scorer, setting the record on a clinching 3-point shot in the quarterfinal of the Big Ten tournament.

=== Freshman year ===
Battle started all but the Nittany Lions' first game at point-guard and led the team in assists (99), points (317) and minutes played (937) while ranking second in threes (48) and third in defensive rebounds (83) on the year...averaged 12.1 ppg in Big Ten conference games raising his scoring average by nearly six points per game from the non-conference season. He posted a career high point total four times in his first five Big Ten games and had 13 double-digit outings vs. conference opponents and 16 on the year. His 35 threes in the Big Ten play led the team.

Year	Games Played	Minutes/Game	Points/Game	Rebounds/Game	Assists/Game	Turnovers/Game	Assist/Turnover	Steals/Game	Steals/Season
2007–08	31	30.2	10.2	3.5	3.2	2.3	1.41	1.3	40

=== Sophomore year ===
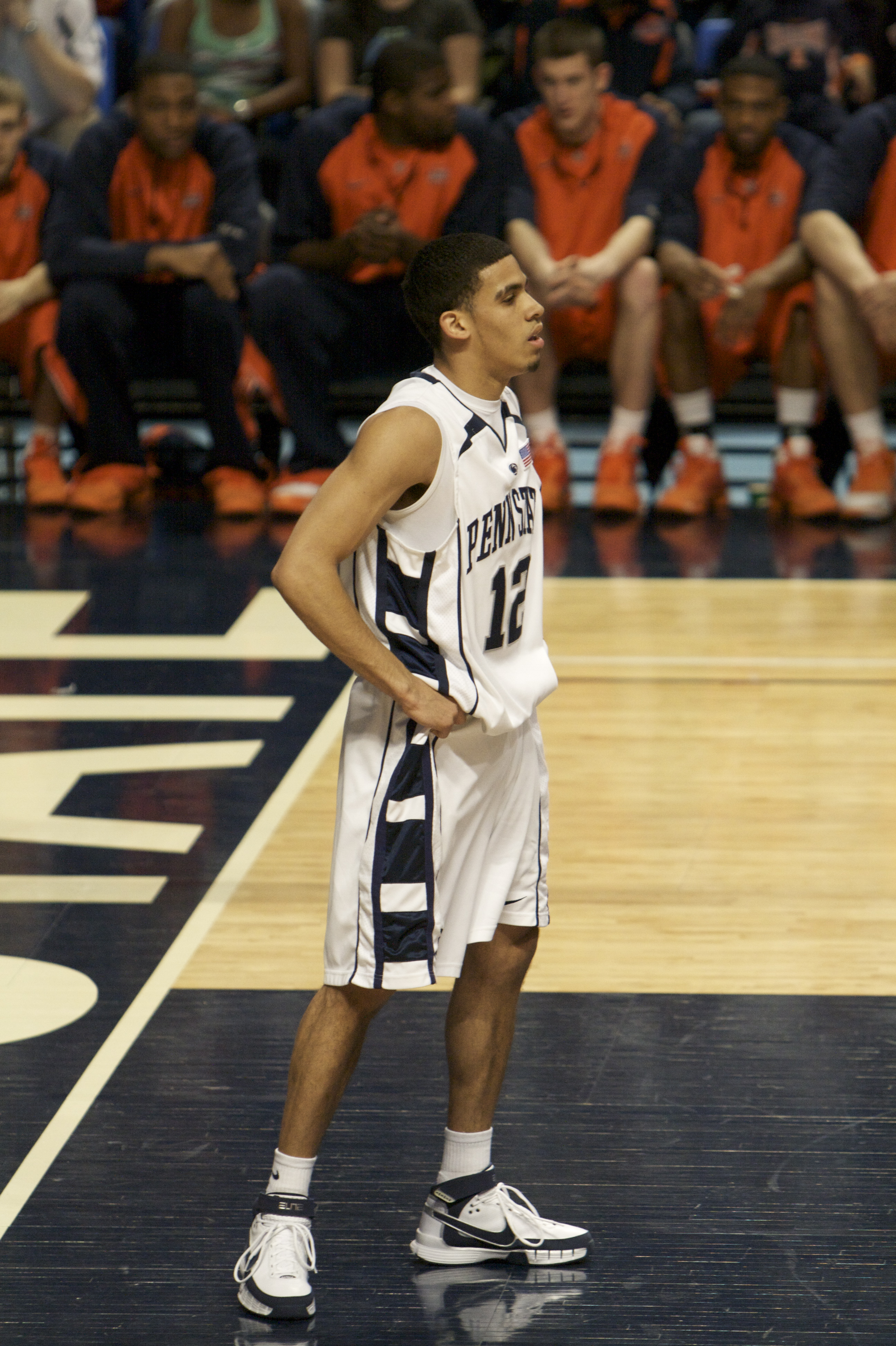
Battle in 2009

In his second season at Penn State Battle posted one of the most outstanding seasons in Penn State history setting a school record with 189 assists and racking up 635 points (fifth best ever) while leading the Nittany Lions to a school-record 27 wins and the programs first-ever national tournament title in the 2009 NIT. Battle was named to the NIT All-Tournament team. Battle earned first-team All-Big Ten, USBWA All-Region and NABC All-District honors while receiving honorable-mention All-America consideration from FOXsports.com and CollegeHoops.net. He led the Big Ten in scoring in the regular season (17.3 ppg) and Led the nation (1,422 minutes) and Big Ten (37.4 mpg) in playing time while making 37 starts and playing in all 38 games. He led Penn State in scoring (16.7), assists (5.0) and threes (92) and was second in steals (45). He Ranked in the top 15 of eight Big Ten statistical categories, including second in assists, third in made threes, and 12th in rebounding (5.3). He Led Big Ten with 14 20-point games

Year	Games Played	Minutes/Game	Points/Game	Rebounds/Game	Assists/Game	Turnovers/Game	Assist/Turnover	Steals/Game	Steals/Season
2008–09	38	37.4	16.7	5.3	5.0	2.4	2.05	1.2	45

=== Junior year ===
In his Junior Year he was the only BCS conference player to lead his team in scoring (18.8 ppg), rebounding (5.4 rpg), assists (4.1 apg) and steals (1.1 spg). Battle earned post-season all-conference honors for the second-straight season by being named to the All-Big Ten second team.

Year	Games Played	Minutes/Game	Points/Game	Rebounds/Game	Assists/Game	Turnovers/Game	Assist/Turnover	Steals/Game	Steals/Season
2009–10	31	37.0	18.5	5.3	4.2	2.3	1.79	1.1	34

=== Senior year ===
Talor averaged 20.2 points a game,4.4 rebounds and 2.9 assists while leading Penn State to a 16–14 record during the regular season and beating Indiana, Wisconsin and Michigan State to get to the Big Ten tournament finals. Penn state would go on to lose to Ohio State. Ultimately Penn State received a bid to the NCAA Tournament, their first in 10 years. Penn State lost to Temple in a close affair 66–64. Talor Battle scored 23 points, received 2 rebounds and 3 assists in the loss. This marked the last game of Talor Battle's college career.

== Professional career ==
In August 2011 he signed with the French team Cholet Basket. Early in December 2011 Talor Battle left France and signed a contract with German team Telekom Baskets Bonn. Battle played with the Los Angeles Clippers in the 2012 NBA Summer League. In his fifth and final game he had 17 points and 7 assists on 6–9 from the field and 5–6 on three-pointers in 23 minutes.

On August 4, 2012, Battle signed with Capo d'Orlando of Italy's Legadue Basket.

On July 18, 2013, Battle signed with Belfius Mons-Hainaut. After the regular season he won the Star of the Coaches award. In June 2015, he left Belfius Mons-Hainaut.

On August 9, 2015, Battle signed with Hapoel Tel Aviv of the Israeli League. On February 29, 2016, he parted ways with Hapoel after averaging 12.5 points, 4.6 rebounds and 5.8 assists per game.

On February 5, 2017, Battle signed with Hungarian club Atomerőmű SE for the rest of the 2016–17 Nemzeti Bajnokság I/A season.

On July 14, 2017, he signed a one-year deal with Slovenian club Union Olimpija. On February 21, 2018, Battle and Olimpija terminated contact, because he decided to finish basketball career due consistent problems with injuries.

=== The Basketball Tournament (TBT) (2015–2017) ===
In the summers of 2015 and 2017, Battle played in The Basketball Tournament on ESPN for team Armored Athlete. He competed for the $2 million prize, and for team Armored Athlete in 2017, he averaged 9.8 points per game. Battle helped take team Armored Athlete in 2017 to the West Regional Championship, where they lost to Team Challenge ALS 75–63. In 2018, Talor participated in the TBT with team Scarlet and Gray, a team of mostly former Ohio State basketball players.
