= Tony Carr (basketball) =

American basketball player (born 1997)

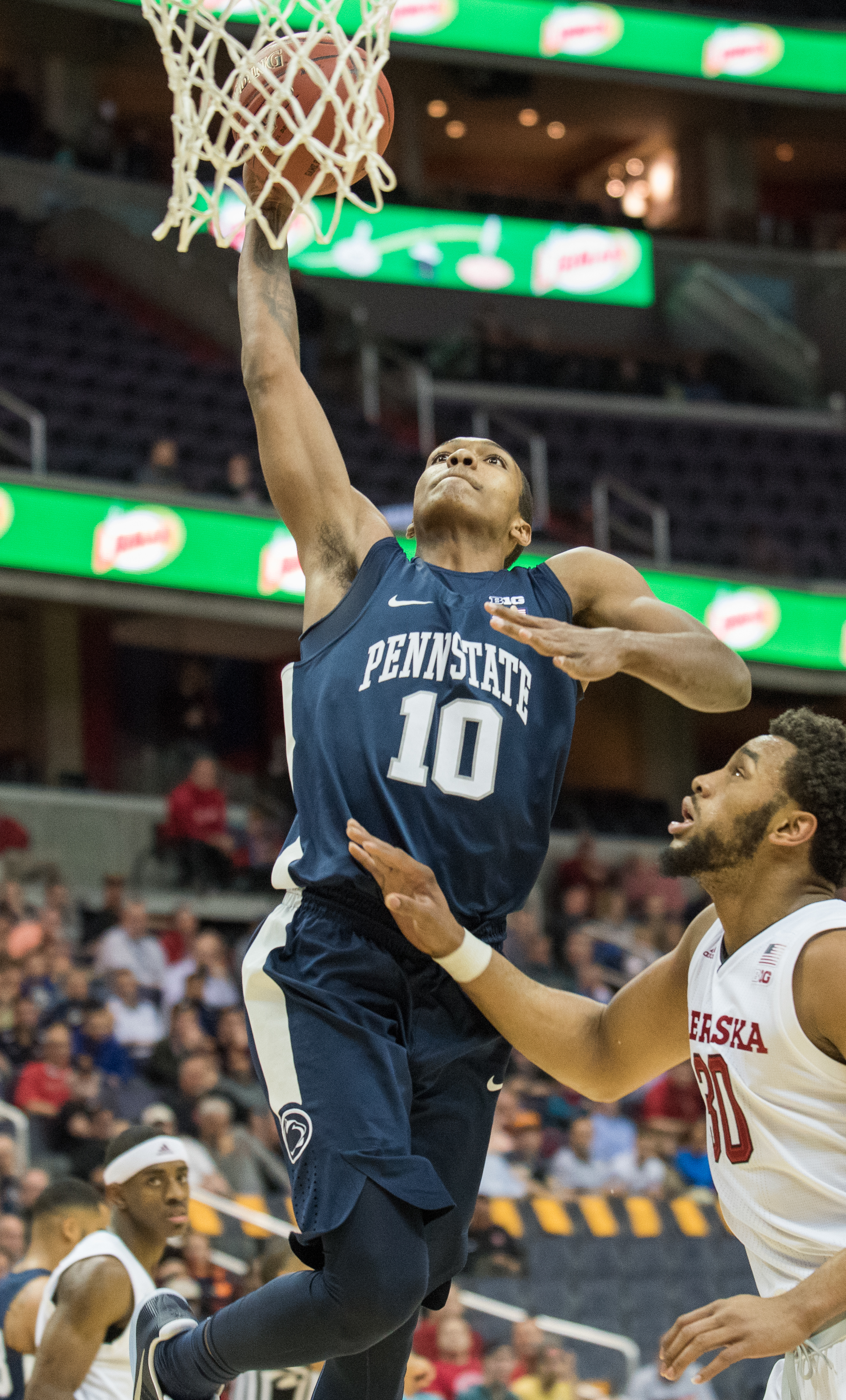

No. 10 – Grand Rapids Gold
- Position: Shooting guard / small forward
- League: NBA G League

Personal information
- Born: October 11, 1997 (age 29) Philadelphia, Pennsylvania, U.S.
- Listed height: 6 ft 5 in (1.96 m)
- Listed weight: 200 lb (91 kg)

Career information
- High school: Roman Catholic (Philadelphia, Pennsylvania)
- College: Penn State (2016–2018)
- NBA draft: 2018: 2nd round, 51st overall pick
- Drafted by: New Orleans Pelicans
- Playing career: 2018–present

Career history
- 2018–2019: Auxilium Torino
- 2019: Cantù
- 2019–2020: Parma Perm
- 2020–2021: Erie BayHawks
- 2022: Saskatchewan Rattlers
- 2022–2023: Bakken Bears
- 2023: Hapoel Gilboa Galil
- 2023–2024: Kuwait SC
- 2024–2025: Manama Club
- 2025: Sagesse Club
- 2026–present: Grand Rapids Gold

Career highlights
- CEBL assists leader (2022); NIT champion (2018); First-team All-Big Ten (2018); Big Ten All-Freshman team (2017); Mr. Pennsylvania Basketball (2016)
- Stats at NBA.com
- Stats at Basketball Reference

Anthony Gregory Carr (born October 11, 1997) is an American professional basketball player for the Grand Rapids Gold of the NBA G League. He played college basketball for the Penn State Nittany Lions.

== Early years ==
Carr was born Anthony Gregory Andre Carr in Philadelphia, Pennsylvania. He attended Roman Catholic High School where helped lead the Cahillites to back-to-back PIAA AAAA-level state championships, along with teammates Nazeer Bostick and Lamar Stevens, who also signed with Penn State's Class of 2016.

After strong junior and senior years, Carr was Named the 2016 Pennsylvania Player of the Year by USA Today and by the Pennsylvania Sports Writers in 2015 and 2016. He earned First Team All-Pennsylvania (PA Sports Writers) honors and All-Philadelphia accolades by the Philadelphia Daily News each of the last two years and also was ranked No. 50 in 2016 ESPN Top 100 recruits.

=== Recruiting ===
College recruiting (2017)
Name	Hometown	School	Height	Weight	Commit date
Tony Carr; SG	Philadelphia, PA	Roman Catholic High School	6 ft 5 in (1.96 m)	204 lb (93 kg)	Aug 13, 2016
Tony Carr; SG	Recruit ratings: Scout: Rivals: 247Sports: ESPN: (87)				
Overall recruit ranking:
Note: In many cases, Scout, Rivals, 247Sports, On3, and ESPN may conflict in their listings of height and weight.; In these cases, the average was taken. ESPN grades are on a 100-point scale.; Sources: "2017 Team Ranking". Rivals.

Awards and Honors

- 2× All-Philadelphia Area (2015, 2016)
- Pennsylvania Player of the Year by USA Today (2016)
- 2× PA Sports Writers Player of the Year (2015, 2016)
- 2× First Team All-Pennsylvania (2016, 2016)
- First Team All-Pennsylvania by PennLive.com (2016)
- 2× Pennsylvania State Champion (2015, 2016)

== College career ==
=== Freshman season ===
Carr signed with the Nittany Lions on August 13, 2016. Carr, along with teammates Lamar Stevens and Nazeer Bostick, would join guard Shep Garner, who was a junior with the Nittany Lions.

In his freshman season, Carr averaged 13.2 points per game, leading the Nittany Lions in scoring.

He recorded his best shooting performance of the season on January 18, tallying 24 points in a 78–75 loss to the Indiana Hoosiers. Carr started all 33 games. He was named to the Big Ten All-Freshman team.

=== Sophomore season ===
Carr opened the season with a 33-point performance in an 86–75 win over Campbell. It was the first of four 30-point performances in the 2017–2018 season.

Carr scored 28 points and went 10–14 from the field in an 82–79 upset over No. 13 Ohio State. Carr hit the game-winning shot as time expired to give Penn State their first win that season over an AP Top 25 opponent. The Nittany Lions would beat the Buckeyes twice more, including a 69–68 upset win in the quarterfinals of the Big Ten tournament.

Penn State earned a berth in the National Invitation Tournament for the first time since 2009, when they claimed their first title. Penn State opened with a 63–57 win over Temple, a game in which Carr had his worst shooting performance of the season, scoring just two points on 12 shots. The Nittany Lions then cruised to another NIT championship with wins over Notre Dame, Marquette, Mississippi State and Utah. Carr averaged 17.4 points per game in the tournament with strong performances in the team's final four games. Carr recorded a double-double (15 points, 14 assists) in the NIT championship game.

After the season, Carr declared for the 2018 NBA draft. On June 21, 2018, Carr was selected by the New Orleans Pelicans with the 51st pick in the draft.

== Professional career ==
=== Europe (2018–2020) ===
On July 20, 2018, Carr signed a deal with the Italian club Auxilium Torino.

On February 26, 2019, Carr left Auxilium Torino and signed with fellow Italian team Pallacanestro Cantù.

On August 10, 2019, Parma Basket of the VTB United League announced they had signed Carr.

=== Erie BayHawks (2020–2021) ===
On January 3, 2020, Carr returned to the United States and signed with the Pelicans' G League affiliate Erie BayHawks. On March 6, Carr contributed 12 points, 10 assists, four rebounds, four steals and one block in a win against the Greensboro Swarm. He averaged 8.5 points and 2.9 rebounds per game.

On December 5, 2020, Carr signed with the New Orleans Pelicans, but was later waived by the New Orleans Pelicans at the end of training camp, on December 19. On January 21, 2021, he returned to Erie.

=== Saskatchewan Rattlers (2022) ===
On May 6, 2022, Carr signed with the Saskatchewan Rattlers of the CEBL. He averaged 19.8 points (5th in the CEBL), 6.5 rebounds (10th), 6.6 assists (2nd), and 0.9 steals per game in 19 games.

=== Bakken Bears (2022–2023) ===
On August 5, 2022, he signed with Bakken Bears of the Danish Basketligaen. Carr left the team in January 2023.

=== Hapoel Gilboa Galil (2023) ===
In January 2023 Carr joined Hapoel Gilboa Galil in the Israeli Basketball Premier League.

=== Kuwait SC (2023–2024) ===
On October 22, 2023, Carr joined Kuwait SC.

=== Sagesse (2025) ===
On September 23, 2025, Carr signed with Sagesse Club of the Lebanese league.

=== Grand Rapids Gold (2026–present) ===
In 2026, Carr signed with the Montreal Alliance, however he never played for the team. Carr subsequently signed with the Grand Rapids Gold of the NBA G League.

== Career statistics ==
Legend
GP	Games played	GS	Games started	MPG	Minutes per game
FG%	Field goal percentage	3P%	3-point field goal percentage	FT%	Free throw percentage
RPG	Rebounds per game	APG	Assists per game	SPG	Steals per game
BPG	Blocks per game	PPG	Points per game	**Bold**	Career high

=== College ===
Year	Team	GP	GS	MPG	FG%	3P%	FT%	RPG	APG	SPG	BPG	PPG
2016–17	Penn State	33	33	32.8	.377	.320	.771	4.8	4.2	.7	**.3**	13.2
2017–18	Penn State	**37**	**37**	**35.4**	**.408**	**.433**	**.799**	**4.9**	**5.0**	**.8**	**.3**	**19.6**
Career		70	70	34.2	.396	.395	.786	4.9	4.6	.7	.3	16.6

== Personal life ==
Carr is the son of Anthony and Nicole Carr. He also has two brothers, Derek Carr and Khalief Tinley, and one sister, Ciara Robinson. He majored in recreation, park, & tourism management at Penn State.
