= Penn State Nittany Lions basketball =

Men's basketball team of Penn State University

2026–27 Penn State Nittany Lions basketball team
- University: Pennsylvania State University
- First season: 1896–97; 130 years ago
- Athletic director: Pat Kraft
- Head coach: Mike Rhoades; 4th season, 44–52 (.458)
- Location: University Park, Pennsylvania
- Arena: Bryce Jordan Center (capacity: 15,261)
- NCAA division: Division I
- Conference: Big Ten
- Nickname: Nittany Lions
- Colors: Blue and white
- Student section: Legion of Blue
- All-time record: 1,589–1,294–1 (.551)
- NCAA tournament record: 10–12 (.455)

NCAA Division I tournament third place
- 1954
Other NCAA Division I tournament results
Final Four	1954
Elite Eight	1942, 1954
Sweet Sixteen	1952, 1954, 1955, 2001
Appearances	1942, 1952, 1954, 1955, 1965, 1991, 1996, 2001, 2011, 2023

NIT champions
- 2009, 2018

Conference tournament champions
- A-10: 1991

Conference division champions
- ECBL West: 1977

Uniforms
Home	Away

The Penn State Nittany Lions basketball team is an NCAA Division I college basketball team representing the Pennsylvania State University. They play home games at the 15,261-seat Bryce Jordan Center, moving there from Rec Hall during the 1995–96 season. Their student cheering section is known as the Legion of Blue.

The team played its first season of basketball in 1897, finishing with a 1–1 record after playing Bucknell twice. They lost the first game 4–24, and won the second 10–7. The team went without a formal head coach until Burke Hermann in 1916.

The program has ten NCAA tournament appearances with its best finish coming in 1954, reaching the Final Four. Its most recent appearance was in 2023, when the team beat Texas A&M in the first round. The program also has 11 appearances in the National Invitation Tournament, with the most recent being in 2018, when they beat Utah to win the NIT championship. They also won the NIT championship in 2009.

== Current coaching staff ==
Position	Name	Year	Alma mater
Head coach	Mike Rhoades	2025	Lebanon Valley (1995)
Associate Head Coach	Brent Scott	2025	Rice University (2003)
Assistant Coach	Talor Battle	2025	Penn State University (2011)
Assistant Coach	Clay Connor	2025	Shippensburg University (2018)
Assistant Coach	Dwayne Stephens	2025	Michigan State (1993)
General Manager	Scott Pera	2025	Penn State Harrisburg (1989)
Director of Basketball Operations	Jake Szczecina	2025	Misericordia University (2018)
Video Coordinator/Player Development	Sam Little	2025	University of Texas (2020)
Assistant Director of Operations	Alex Grumer	2025	Pennsylvania State University (2026)

== Coaching history ==
No.	Coach	Years	Seasons	Record	Pct.	Cnf. Record	Pct.	Cnf. Titles	Nat. Titles	NCAA Appearances
N/A	No coach	1896-97–1914-15, 1917–1918	20	131–65–1	.668				0	
1	Burke M. "Dutch" Hermann	1915-16–1917-18, 1919-20–1931–32	15	148–73	.716				0	
Interim	Hugo Bezdek	1918-19	1	11–2	.846				0	
2	Earl Leslie	1932-33–1935-36	4	29–28	.509	0–10	.000	0	0	
3	John Lawther	1936-37–1948-49	13	150–93	.617	17–13	.567	0	0	1
4	Elmer Gross	1949-50–1953-54	5	80–40	.667				0	2
5	John Egli	1954-55–1967-68	14	187–135	.581				0	2
6	Johnny Bach	1968-69–1977-78	10	122–121	.502	9–11	.450	0	0	0
7	Dick Harter	1978-79–1982-83	5	79–61	.564	13–11	.564	0	0	0
8	Bruce Parkhill	1983-84–1994-95	12	181–169	.517	82–116	.414	1	0	1
9	Jerry Dunn	1995-96–2002-03	8	117–121	.492	45–87	.341	0	0	2
10	Ed DeChellis	2003-04–2010-11	8	114–138	.452	41–95	.301	0	0	1
11	Pat Chambers	2011-12–2019-20	9	148–150	.497	56–110	.337	0	0	0
Interim	Jim Ferry	2020-21	1	11–14	.440	7–12	.368	0	0	0
12	Micah Shrewsberry	2021-22–2022-23	2	37–31	.544	17–23	.425	0	0	1
13	Mike Rhoades	2023-24–Present	3	43–46	.483	17–37	.315	0	0	0
13	Totals	1896-97–Present	130	1588–1287–1	.552	304–525	.367	1	0	10

== Postseason ==
=== NCAA tournament results ===
The Nittany Lions have appeared in the NCAA tournament 10 times. Their combined record is 10–12.

Year	Seed	Round	Opponent	Result
1942		Elite Eight; Regional 3rd Place Game	Dartmouth; Illinois	L 39–44; W 41–34
1952		Sweet Sixteen; Regional 3rd Place Game	Kentucky; NC State	L 54–82; L 60–69
1954		First Round; Sweet Sixteen; Elite Eight; Final Four; National 3rd Place Game	Toledo; LSU; Notre Dame; La Salle; USC	W 62–50; W 78–70; W 71–63; L 54–69; W 70–61
1955		First Round; Sweet Sixteen; Regional 3rd Place Game	Memphis State; Iowa; Kentucky	W 59–55; L 53–82; L 59–84
1965		First Round	Princeton	L 58–60
1991	#13	First Round; Second Round	#4 UCLA #12 Eastern Michigan	W 74–69; L 68–71 ^{OT}
1996	#5	First Round	#12 Arkansas	L 80–86
2001	#7	First Round; Second Round; Sweet Sixteen	#10 Providence #2 North Carolina #11 Temple	W 69–59; W 82–74; L 72–84
2011	#10	First Round	#7 Temple	L 64–66
2023	#10	First Round; Second Round	#7 Texas A&M #2 Texas	W 76–59; L 66–71

=== NIT results ===
The Nittany Lions have appeared in the National Invitation Tournament (NIT) 11 times. Their combined record is 27–9. They were NIT champions in 2009 and 2018.

Year	Round	Opponent	Result
1966	First Round	San Francisco	L 77–89
1980	First Round	Alabama	L 49–53
1989	First Round; Second Round	Murray State; Villanova	W 89–73; L 67–76
1990	First Round; Second Round; Quarterfinals; Semifinals; 3rd Place Game	Marquette; Maryland; Rutgers; Vanderbilt; New Mexico	W 57–54; W 80–78; W 58–55; L 62–75; W 83–81
1992	First Round	Pittsburgh	L 65–67
1995	First Round; Second Round; Quarterfinals; Semifinals; 3rd Place Game	Miami (FL); Nebraska; Iowa; Marquette; Canisius	W 62–56; W 65–59; W 67–64; L 79–81; W 66–62
1998	First Round; Second Round; Quarterfinals; Semifinals; Finals	Rider; Dayton; Georgia Tech; Georgia; Minnesota	W 82–68; W 77–74; W 77–70; W 66–60; L 72–79
2000	First Round; Second Round; Quarterfinals; Semifinals; 3rd Place Game	Princeton; Siena; Kent State; Notre Dame; NC State	W 55–41; W 105–103; W 81–74; L 52–73; W 74–72
2006	Opening Round	Rutgers	L 71–76
2009	First Round; Second Round; Quarterfinals; Semifinals; Finals	George Mason; Rhode Island; Florida; Notre Dame; Baylor	W 77–73 ^{OT} W 83–72; W 71–62; W 67–59; W 69–63
2018	First Round; Second Round; Quarterfinals; Semifinals; Finals	Temple; Notre Dame; Marquette; Mississippi State; Utah	W 63–57; W 73–63; W 85–80; W 75–60; W 82–66

=== CBI results ===
The Nittany Lions have appeared in the College Basketball Invitational (CBI) once. Their record is 1–1.

Year	Round	Opponent	Result
2014	First Round; Quarterfinals	Hampton; Siena	W 69–65; L 52–54

== Statistical leaders ==
=== 1,000 Point Scorers ===
Rank	Player	Points	Years	Rank	Player	Points	Years	Rank	Player	Points	Years
1	Talor Battle	2,213	2007–2011	17	John Amaechi	1,310	1992–1995	33	Gyasi Cline-Heard	1,058	1997–2001
2	Lamar Stevens^{+}	2,207	2016–2020	18	Brandon Taylor	1,289	2012–2016	34	Steve Kuhn	1,057	1976–1980
3	Jesse Arnelle	2,138	1951–1955	19	Calvin Booth	1,288	1995–1999	35	James Barnes	1,025	1987–1991
4	Joe Crispin	1,986	1997–2001	20	Seth Lundy	1,283	2019–2023	36	Tony Ward	1,020	1984–1988
5	D.J. Newbill	1,812	2012–2015	21	Dan Earl	1,256	1993–1999	37	Mike Edelman	1,019	1978–1982
6	Shep Garner	1,629	2014–2018	22	Monroe Brown	1,244	1988–1992	38	Gene Harris	1,018	1959–1962
7	Pete Lisicky	1,605	1994–1998	23	Ron Brown	1,184	1972–1974	39	Mike Lang	1,014	1979–1983
8	Jamelle Cornley	1,579	2005–2009	24	Mike Watkins	1,171	2016–2020	40	Jeff Miller	1,008	1974–1978
9	DeRon Hayes	1,570	1989–1993	25	Carver Clinton	1,165	1963–1966				
10	Tim Frazier	1,543	2009–2014	26	Tony Carr	1,161	2016–2018				
11	Geary Claxton	1,542	2004–2008	27	Mark DuMars	1,139	1958–1961				
12	Tom Hovasse	1,459	1985–1989	28	Myles Dread	1,097	2018–2023				
13	Jarrett Stephens	1,372	1995–2000	29	Bob Weiss	1,091	1962–1965				
14	Titus Ivory	1,369	1996–2001	30	Jeff Persson	1,090	1965–1968				
15	Freddie Barnes	1,342	1988–1992	31	Josh Reaves	1,079	2015–2019				
16	Ed Fogell	1,329	1985–1990	32	Jalen Pickett	1,068	2021–2023				

^{+} 2020 B1G Tournament and 2020 NCAA Tournament cancelled due to COVID-19 Pandemic.

^{**} denotes active player.

=== Assists ===
Rank	Player	Assists	Years	Rank	Player	Assists	Years
1	Tim Frazier	641	2009–2014	12	Jalen Pickett	378	2021–2023
2	Freddie Barnes	600	1988–1992	13	Ron Brown	350	1972–1974
3	Dan Earl	574	1993–1999	14	Tony Ward	331	1984–1988
4	Talor Battle	517	2007–2011	15	Tony Carr	325	2016–2018
T-5	Joe Crispin	485	1997–2001	16	Shep Garner	317	2014–2018
T-5	Tom Wilkinson	485	1976–1980	17	Josh Reaves	310	2015–2019
7	Monroe Brown	450	1988–1992	18	Pete Lisicky	291	1994–1998
8	Titus Ivory	443	1996–2001	19	D.J. Newbill	288	2012–2015
9	Ben Luber	418	2003–2007	20	Brandon Watkins	287	1999–2003
10	Ace Baldwin Jr.	412	2023–2025	21	Lamar Stevens	262	2016–2020
11	Dwight Gibson	385	1991–1995	22			

=== Rebounds (650+) ===
Rank	Player	Rebounds	Years	Rank	Player	Rebounds	Years
1	Jesse Arnelle	1,238	1951–1955	12	Carvin Jefferson	713	1975–1979
2	Mike Watkins	956	2016–2020	13	Randy Meister	712	1972–1975
3	Mike Lang	912	1979–1983	14	Jarrett Stephens	703	1995–2000
4	Lamar Stevens	875	2016–2020	15	Andrew Jones	681	2007–2011
5	Ross Travis	816	2011–2015	16	Gyasi Cline-Heard	672	1997–2001
6	Gene Harris	762	1959–1962				
7	Geary Claxton	755	2004–2008				
	Jamelle Cornley	755	2005–2009				
9	John Amaechi	745	1992–1995				
10	Carver Clinton	734	1963–1966				
11	Calvin Booth	728	1995–1999				

== All-Americans ==
Year	Team	Name	Outlet
1954	1st Team	Jesse Arnelle	Helms Foundation
1955	2nd Team	Jesse Arnelle	Helms Foundation
2023	2nd Team	Jalen Pickett	AP, NABC, SN

== NBA players ==
=== NBA draft ===
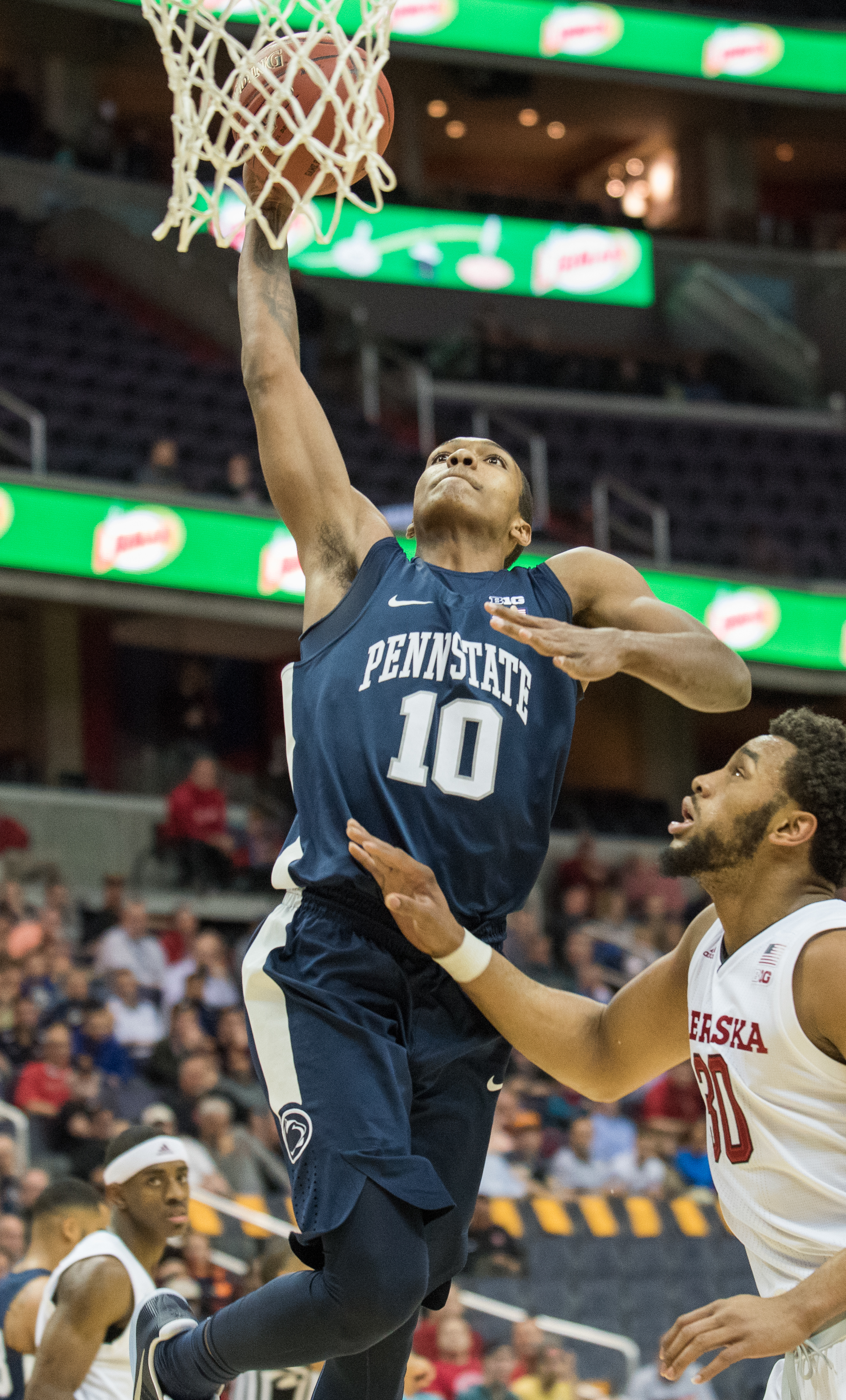
Tony Carr

Year	Round	Pick	Name	Team
1947	3	10	John Rusinko	Baltimore Bullets
1953	7	2	Herman Sledzik	Baltimore Bullets
1955	2	13	Jesse Arnelle	Fort Wayne Pistons
1965	3	22	Bob Weiss	Philadelphia 76ers
1966	11	6	Carver Clinton	Philadelphia 76ers
1974	7	17	Ron Brown	Boston Celtics
1981	3	57	Frank Brickowski	New York Knicks
1983	8	12	Mike Lang	New York Knicks
1984	10	211	Dick Mumma	Los Angeles Clippers
1994	10	211	John Amaechi	Cleveland Cavaliers
1999	2	35	Calvin Booth	Washington Wizards
2018	2	51	Tony Carr	New Orleans Pelicans
2023	2	32	Jalen Pickett	Denver Nuggets
2023	2	46	Seth Lundy	Atlanta Hawks
2024	1	30	Yanic Konan Niederhäuser	Los Angeles Clippers

=== Other NBA players ===
The following is a list of undrafted Penn State players who have played at least one NBA regular or post-season game. Bold denotes players with active NBA or NBA G League contracts.

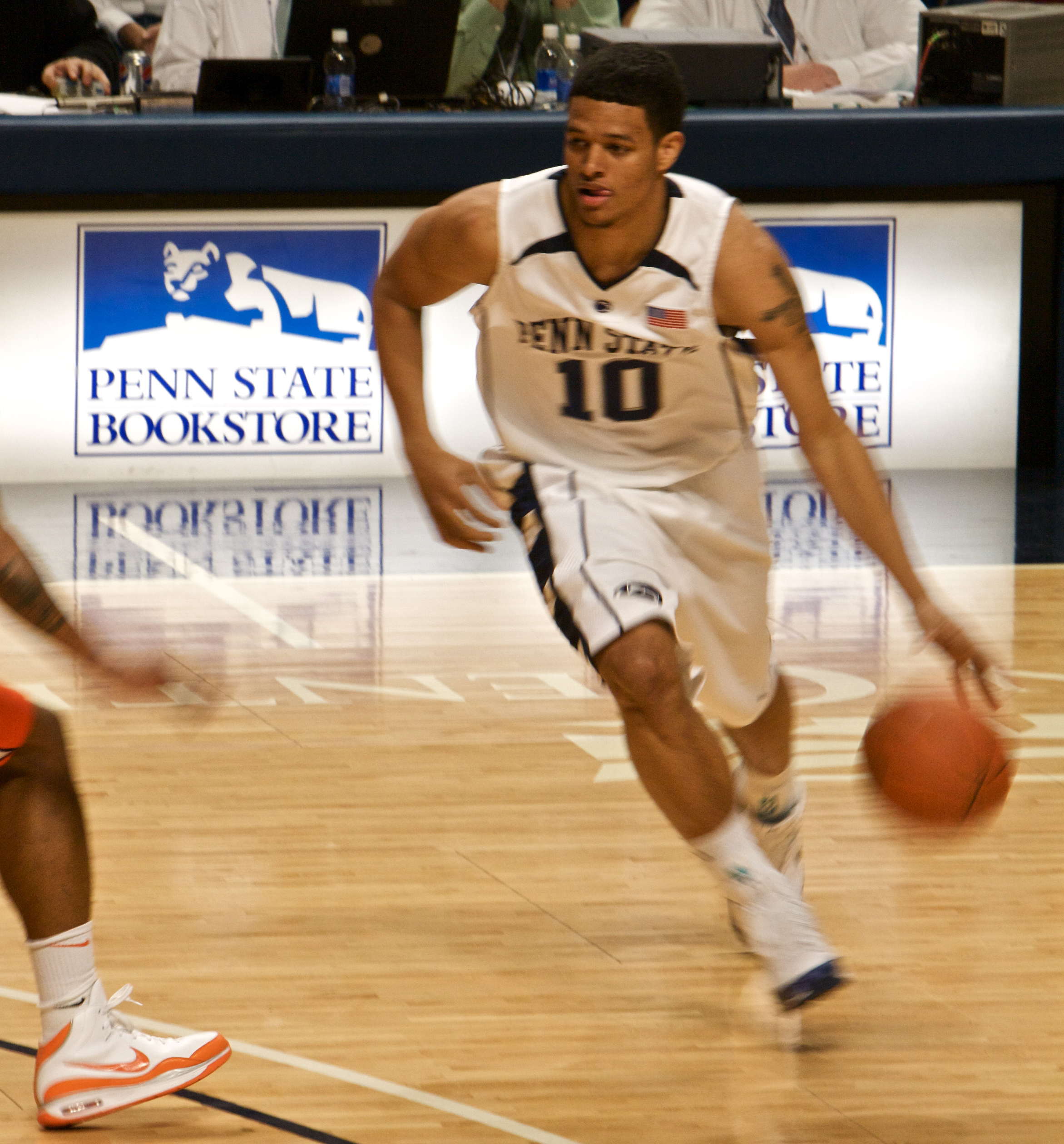
Chris Babb

- **Lamar Stevens**
- **Andrew Funk**
- **Izaiah Brockington**
- Josh Reaves
- Tim Frazier
- Chris Babb
- John Amaechi
- Joe Crispin
- Tom Hovasse
- Herschel Baltimore
- John Barr

== Penn State Men's Basketball Radio Affiliates ==
- WAEB (790 AM) Allentown
- WTNA (1430 AM) Altoona
- WILK-FM (103.1 FM) Avoca
- WNNA (106.1 FM) Beaver Springs
- WRAX (1600 AM) Bedford
- WISR (680 AM) Butler
- WCPA (900 AM) Clearfield
- WQQP (95.9 FM) DuBois
- WPSE (1450 AM) Erie
- WFRA (1450 AM) Franklin
- WGET (1320 AM) Gettysburg
- WHVR (1280 AM) Hanover
- WHGB (1400 AM) Harrisburg
- W237DE (95.3 FM) Harrisburg
- WLMZ (1300 AM) Hazleton
- WRKK (1200 AM) Hughesville
- WDBF-FM (106.3 FM) Huntingdon
- WRKY (1490 AM) Lancaster
- WNPV (1440 AM) Lansdale
- WLBR (1270 AM) Lebanon
- WIBF (92.5 FM) Lewistown
- WOGA (92.3 FM) Mansfield
- WMGW (1490 AM) Meadville
- WUZZ (1280 AM) New Castle
- WVNJ (1160 AM) New York City, NY
- WNTP (990 AM) Philadelphia
- KQV (1410 AM) Pittsburgh
- WPPA (1360 AM) Pottsville
- WRAW (1340 AM) Reading
- WAAF (910 AM) Scranton
- WLEJ (1450 AM) State College
- WKOK (1070 AM) Sunbury
- WTIV (1230 AM) Titusville
- WTZN (1310 AM) Troy
- WTRN (1340 AM) Tyrone
- W264BZ (100.7 FM) Tyrone
- WICU (1310 AM) Warren
- WNBT-FM (104.5 FM) Wellsboro
- WILK (980 AM) Wilkes-Barre
- WRAK (1400 AM) Williamsport
- WSBA (910 AM) York
