= 2017–18 Michigan State Spartans men's basketball team =

American college basketball season

2017–18 Michigan State Spartans men's basketball

Big Ten regular season champions Phil Knight Invitational Victory Bracket champions

NCAA tournament, Second Round
- Conference: Big Ten Conference

Ranking
- Coaches: No. 11
- AP: No. 5
- Record: 30–5 (16–2 Big Ten)
- Head coach: Tom Izzo (23rd season)
- Associate head coach: Dwayne Stephens (15th season)
- Assistant coaches: Mike Garland (11th season); Dane Fife (7th season)
- Captains: Lourawls "Tum Tum" Nairn Jr.; Miles Bridges
- Home arena: Breslin Center

2017–18 Big Ten Conference men's basketball standings
	Conf.				Overall
Team	W		L	PCT	W		L	PCT
No. 5 Michigan State	16	–	2	.889	30	–	5	.857
No. 11 Purdue	15	–	3	.833	30	–	7	.811
No. 17 Ohio State	15	–	3	.833	25	–	9	.735
No. 7 Michigan †	13	–	5	.722	33	–	8	.805
Nebraska	13	–	5	.722	22	–	11	.667
Penn State	9	–	9	.500	26	–	13	.667
Indiana	9	–	9	.500	16	–	15	.516
Maryland	8	–	10	.444	19	–	13	.594
Wisconsin	7	–	11	.389	15	–	18	.455
Northwestern	6	–	12	.333	15	–	17	.469
Minnesota	4	–	14	.222	15	–	17	.469
Illinois	4	–	14	.222	14	–	18	.438
Iowa	4	–	14	.222	14	–	19	.424
Rutgers	3	–	15	.167	15	–	19	.441
† 2018 Big Ten tournament winner Rankings from AP poll

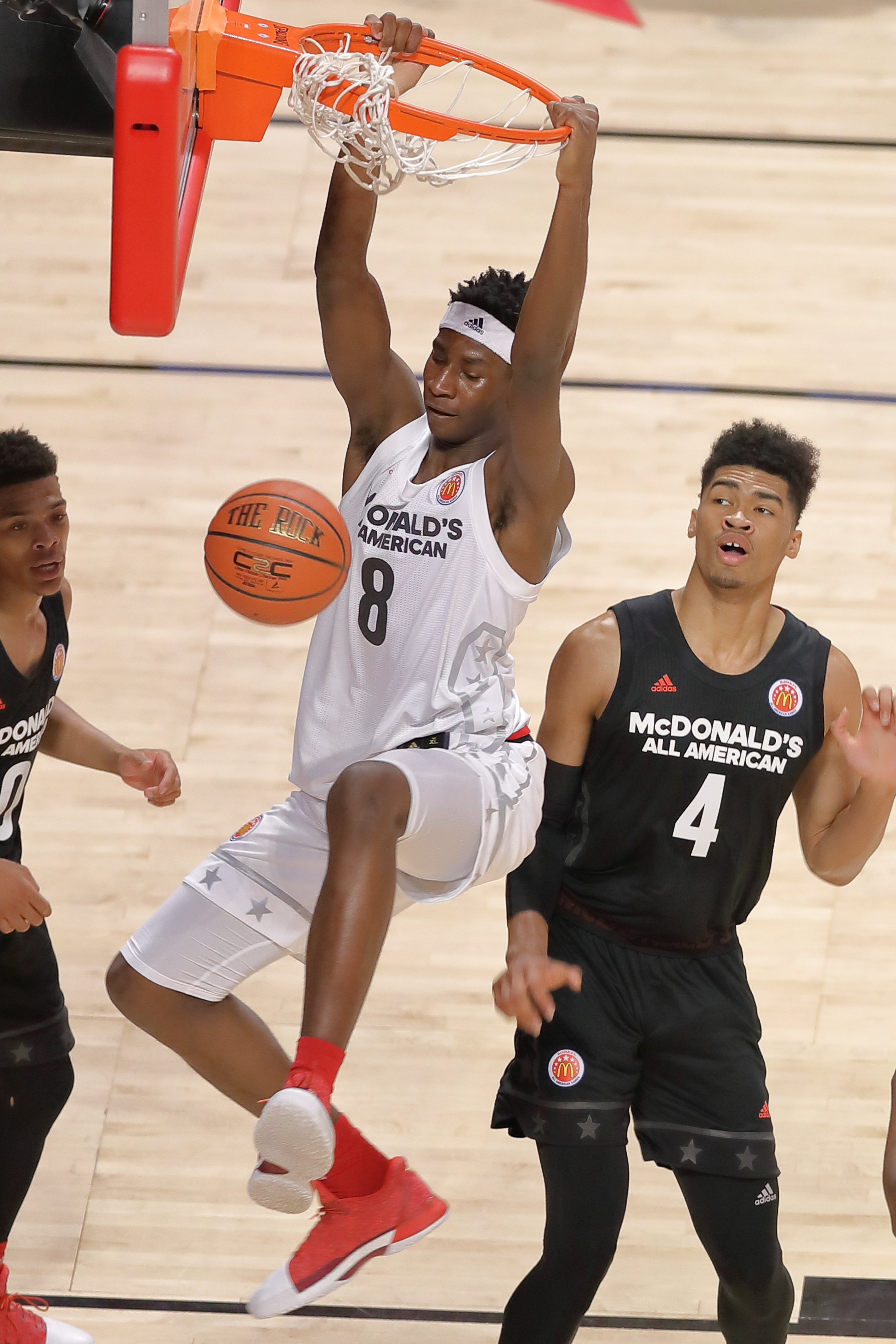
Michigan State recruit Jaren Jackson Jr. at the 2017 McDonald's All-American Boys Game.

The 2017–18 Michigan State Spartans men's basketball team represented Michigan State University in the 2017–18 NCAA Division I men's basketball season. The Spartans, led by 23rd-year head coach Tom Izzo, played their home games at Breslin Center in East Lansing, Michigan as members of the Big Ten Conference.

With a win over Illinois on February 20, 2018, the Spartans secured a share of the Big Ten title, their first regular season title since 2012. On February 25, the Spartans defeated Wisconsin to win the Big Ten title outright, their first outright regular season title since 2009. It marked the Spartans eighth regular season title under Izzo. The Spartans finished the season 30–5, 16–2 in Big Ten play to win the regular season championship. As the No. 1 seed in the Big Ten tournament, they beat Wisconsin in the quarterfinals before losing to Michigan in the semifinals. The Spartans received a bid to the NCAA tournament, their 21st consecutive trip under Izzo, as the No. 3 seed in the Midwest region. They defeated No. 14 Bucknell in the first round before losing to No. 11-seeded Syracuse in the second round. As a result, the Spartans failed to make the Sweet Sixteen for the third consecutive year, a first for the Spartans with Izzo as head coach. The 16 Big Ten wins for the Spartans marked a school record and the 30 overall wins was only the fourth time in school history that the Spartans had won at least 30 games (all under Izzo).

Following the season, Miles Bridges announced he would sign with an agent and declared for the NBA draft. A few days later, Jaren Jackson Jr. also announced he would enter the draft and sign with an agent.

== Previous season ==
The Spartans finished the 2016–17 season 20–15, 10–8 in Big Ten play to finish in a tie for fifth place. In the Big Ten tournament, they defeated Penn State in the second round before losing to Minnesota in the quarterfinals. They received a bid to the NCAA tournament as a No. 9 seed in the Midwest region, their 20th consecutive appearance in the Tournament. They defeated No. 8-seeded Miami in the first round before losing to No. 1-seeded Kansas in the second round. The 15 losses by MSU were the second most ever under Tom Izzo, behind only his 16 losses in his first season as head coach at MSU.

The Spartans were led by freshmen Miles Bridges, 16.9 points and 8.3 rebounds per game, and Nick Ward, 13.9 points and 6.5 rebounds per game.

== Offseason ==
=== Departures ===
Name	Number	Pos.	Height	Weight	Year	Hometown	Notes
Alvin Ellis III	3	G	6'4"	210	Senior	Chicago, IL	Graduated
Eron Harris	14	G	6'3"	190	RS Senior	Indianapolis, IN	Graduated

=== Recruiting class ===
==== 2017 recruiting class ====
On September 15, 2016, five-star forward Jaren Jackson Jr. announced that he would attend Michigan State. He is the son of former NBA player Jaren Jackson Sr. Jackson was listed as the eighth best player in the 2017 final rankings by ESPN. On September 30, 2016, four-star power forward Xavier Tillman committed to MSU. He was considered the best player in the state of Michigan in the 2017 class. Tillman was ranked No. 71 in the 2017 final rankings by ESPN. Tillman and Jackson signed National Letters of Intent on November 9, 2016. With just these two signings, MSU's class was listed as the 14th best in the country by ESPN and 17th by rivals.com.

Two-star point guard Jack Hoiberg, son of Chicago Bulls head coach Fred Hoiberg, announced he would attend Michigan State as a preferred walk-on. On May 30, the school announced that two-star shooting guard Brock Washington would join the Spartans as a preferred walk-on in 2017.

College recruiting
Name	Hometown	School	Height	Weight	Commit date
Jaren Jackson Jr. No. 2 PF	Indianapolis, IN	La Lumiere School	6 ft 11 in (2.11 m)	225 lb (102 kg)	Sep 15, 2016
Jaren Jackson Jr. No. 2 PF	Recruit ratings: Scout: Rivals: 247Sports: (95)				
Xavier Tillman; No. 11 PF	Grand Rapids, MI	Grand Rapids Christian High School	6 ft 9 in (2.06 m)	250 lb (110 kg)	Sep 30, 2016
Xavier Tillman; No. 11 PF	Recruit ratings: Scout: Rivals: 247Sports: (84)				
Overall recruit ranking: Scout: 17 Rivals: 18 ESPN: 15
Note: In many cases, Scout, Rivals, 247Sports, On3, and ESPN may conflict in their listings of height and weight.; In these cases, the average was taken. ESPN grades are on a 100-point scale.; Sources:

=== Early offseason rankings ===
In April, 2017, most early pollsters included Michigan State in the preseason top 25 for the 2017–18 season. These included ESPN (No. 12), Sports Illustrated (No. 8), Yahoo! Sports (No. 11), USA Today (No. 16), NBC Sports (No. 3), CBS Sports (No. 3), Sporting News (No. 5) and Bleacher Report (No. 12). Most of the projections assumed Miles Bridges would not return to East Lansing for his sophomore season. USA Today noted that "leading scorer Miles Bridges is NBA-bound." The Sporting News summarized: "Bridges hasn’t announced his decision yet, but Spartans fans aren’t holding their breath (he’s expected to be a lottery pick)." Following the deadline to withdraw from the NBA draft, many media outlets released updated early top 25 rankings for the 2017–18 season. MSU was a consensus top three team by every major outlet: NBC Sports (No. 1), Fox Sports (No. 2), Sporting News (No. 2), ESPN (No. 3), CBS Sports (No. 3), and Yahoo! Sports (No. 3).

=== Returning players ===
On April 13, 2017, Miles Bridges, considered an NBA lottery pick, announced he would not enter the NBA draft and would return to MSU as a sophomore. His return led many to project MSU as a Final Four contender for the 2017–18 season. Losing only seniors Eron Harris and Alvin Ellis III, the Spartans returned eight of their top 10 players from the prior season. Bridges was also considered a potential candidate for National Player of the Year upon the announcement of his return to Michigan State. The Spartans returned 78% of their scoring and 81% of their rebounding from the previous year.

On May 8, redshirt graduate student Ben Carter was granted a sixth year of eligibility after the NCAA granted his medical hardship waiver. The Spartans had one remaining open scholarship for the 2017–18 season after Carter was granted eligibility. After missing out on late recruiting targets (Brian Bowen, Mark Smith, and Brandon McCoy), the Spartans had one remaining open scholarship. It was confirmed on August 24, 2017, that the last remaining scholarship would be given to former walk-on Connor George, son of Cathy George, MSU's volleyball coach at the time.

=== Transfers ===
On May 11, 6-foot-11, 220-pound center Braden Burke announced he would transfer to Michigan State from Robert Morris and be a preferred walk-on. Burke will have to sit out the 2017–18 season due to NCAA transfer rules.

== Preseason ==
On the first day of practice, September 29, 2017, Tom Izzo announced that Lourawls "Tum Tum" Nairn and Miles Bridges had been selected as captains for the team.

On October 20, MSU held its annual Midnight Madness event at Breslin Center. Tom Izzo did not dress up for the event as he had in the past, but there was a man in a black suit, green tie and extra-large head on his shoulders that was supposed to resemble Izzo. Earlier in the day, the school unveiled the $20 million Tom Izzo Hall of History inside the Breslin Center.

=== Jud Heathcote's death ===
On August 28, former MSU head coach Jud Heathcote, who led the Spartans to their first National Championship in 1979, died at the age of 90. "Michigan State has lost one of its icons today," Tom Izzo said in a statement. "And yet, nothing can erase his impact on the program, the players he coached and the coaches he mentored. Spartan basketball is what it is today because of Jud Heathcote." On September 6, 2017, Michigan State announced that it would wear a memorial patch on their uniforms during the season for former head coach Jud Heathcote who died in late August. The team also announced that the February 10, 2018 game against Purdue would be a tribute game to Heathcote.

=== Preseason rankings ===
In its preseason college preview, Lindy's Sports ranked the Spartans No. 1 in the country. The publication picked Miles Bridges as Big Ten Player of the Year and the top small forward in the country. Nick Ward was named preseason second team All-Big Ten center while Jaren Jackson Jr. was named newcomer of the year.

The Blue Ribbon Yearbook ranked MSU No. 2 in its preseason rankings. The publication listed Miles Bridges as a second team All-American. Athlon Sports ranked the Spartans No. 2 in the country while ranking Bridges as the No. 1 player in the country. Ward and Jackson were selected as second team All-Big Ten and Jackson was named Big Ten newcomer of the year.

Street & Smith ranked MSU No. 3 in the country while naming Bridges first-team All-American. On September 26, NBC Sports named Miles Bridges the national preseason player of the year. On October 23, ESPN.com also named Bridges the national preseason player of the year. On November 6, Bridges was named an AP preseason All-American, receiving 61 of the possible 65 votes.

=== Preseason Big Ten poll ===
Prior to the conference's annual media day, awards and a poll were chosen by a panel of 28 writers, two for each team in the conference. Michigan State was a unanimous selection to win the conference. The Spartans' Miles Bridges was also a unanimous selection for Preseason Player of the Year.

At the Big Ten media day, the Spartans were unanimous selections to win the conference. Miles Bridges was named the Preseason Player of the Year. Nick Ward joined Bridges on the preseason All-Big Ten team.

=== Exhibitions ===
On October 23, 2017, it was announced that MSU would play Georgia in Grand Rapids, Michigan on October 29 in a charity exhibition game to help raise funds for hurricane relief.

In the first exhibition game for the Spartans, MSU defeated Ferris State 80–72 on October 26. Miles Bridges left the game in the first half after falling and cutting his head, but returned in the second half. Cassius Winston led the Spartans in scoring with 24 points as MSU avoided the upset from the Division II Bulldogs. Freshman Jaren Jackson Jr. had 14 points, eight rebounds, and eight blocks in his MSU debut.

On October 29, MSU took on Georgia in a hastily planned charity exhibition game in Grand Rapids to benefit hurricane victims. With four stitches over his right eye from the cut suffered in the first exhibition game, Bridges led the Spartans with 21 points and 10 rebounds. Nick Ward had 13 points while Joshua Langford scored 11 as the Spartans won 80–68.

On November 1, it was announced that junior forward Kyle Ahrens would be out indefinitely after aggravating an injury to his right foot.

The newly ranked No. 2 Spartans (in AP and Coaches poll) took on Division II Hillsdale on November 3 in their final exhibition game. The Spartans held Hillsdale to approximately 20% shooting as Nick Ward led the Spartans with 14 points and 13 rebounds. Jaren Jackson added 13 rebounds and 12 points as MSU won easily 75–44.

== Regular season ==
=== Early non-conference games ===
==== North Florida ====
On November 10, the Spartans opened the regular season at home against North Florida. Miles Bridges scored 20 points and Jaren Jackson Jr. had 13 rebounds as the Spartans routed the Ospreys 98–66. Each Spartan starter scored in double figures: Nick Ward (16), Cassius Winston (12), and Joshua Langford (13). Ward made all six of his shots as the team shot 78% from the free throw line in the easy win.

==== Duke ====
In a matchup of No. 1 versus No. 2 at the Champions Classic in Chicago on November 14, the Spartans struggled with Duke's 2–3 zone. Bridges, Jackson Jr., and Ward each scored 19 points for the Spartans who shot 50% from the field in the game. However, Duke's Grayson Allen scored 37 points and MSU lost the rebound battle and allowed 25 offensive rebounds as they fell 88–81. Head coach Tom Izzo blamed himself for the loss as he fell to 1–11 all time against Duke. The loss moved MSU to 1–1 on the season.

On November 16, the school announced that forward Kenny Goins had suffered a knee strain in the Duke game and would miss several weeks due to the injury.

Also on November 16, Nike announced uniforms for those teams participating in the Phil Knight Invitational. MSU's uniforms were green with bronze highlights.

==== Stony Brook ====
The Spartans returned home to face Stony Brook in a campus site game for the Phil Knight Invitational on November 19. MSU struggled early, trailing by as many as eight before leading by six at the half. The Spartans pulled away in the second half, but suffered a scare as Miles Bridges went down with an ankle injury with over eight minutes remaining in the game. Bridges, who scored 20 points, did not return. Nick Ward led all scorers with 22 and Joshua Langford scored a career-high 19 in the 93–71 win. The MSU sophomores scored 74 of the team's 93 points. After the game, it was announced that Bridges was day-to-day with an ankle sprain.

On November 20, Tom Izzo announced that Bridges' x-rays were negative on his ankle and the swelling had gone down. He said that they would not know for a day or two if Bridges would miss any time.

==== Phil Knight Invitational ====
===== DePaul =====
The Spartans traveled to Portland, Oregon to participate in the Phil Knight Invitational in honor of Nike co-founder Phil Knight's 80th birthday. The tournament, which began on Thanksgiving Day, November 23, ran through November 26. Bridges did not play in the opening round game of the tournament on November 23 as MSU took on DePaul. The Spartans struggled in the first half and went to halftime tied at 31 with the Blue Demons. Matt McQuaid, who started for Bridges, stepped up and scored a career-high 20 points on six of eight shooting from behind the three-point line. The Spartans held DePaul to 25.5% shooting from the field as they pulled away in the second half for a 73–51 win.

===== UConn =====
The next day in the second round of the Phil Knight Invitational, Bridges did play, but did not start as MSU struggled in the first half again, leading by only one at the half. Bridges scored only six points in 17 minutes of play, but Cassius Winston had his best game offensively as a Spartan, scoring a career-high 28 points on 12 of 15 shooting. MSU's defense again dominated the game, holding UConn to only 35% from the floor as the Spartans again pulled away in the second half for the 77–57 win.

===== North Carolina =====
In the championship game of the Victory Bracket of the Phil Knight Invitational on November 26, the Spartans took on No. 9-ranked North Carolina looking to avoid a poor first half for the third straight game. Bridges returned to the starting lineup after coming off the bench against UConn in the previous game. MSU's defense was again the star of the show, holding UNC to a school-record low for shooting percentage as they shot 24.6% from the field, including 5.6% from three-point land. Joshua Langford had the big offensive game for the Spartans, scoring a career-high 23 points as the Spartans dominated from the outset and led by 14 at the half. MSU did struggle with turnovers, giving the ball up 24 times in the game. Despite that, the Spartans stretched the lead to as many as 21 in the second half, beating UNC 63–45 and marked Tom Izzo's first win over North Carolina since 2000 and first win against UNC when coached by Roy Williams. The win gave the Spartans the Phil Knight Invitational Victory Bracket championship and Cassius Winston was named the bracket's MVP. The win moved MSU to 5–1 on the season.

==== Notre Dame ====
On the final day of November, the Spartans returned home to welcome No. 5-ranked Notre Dame to East Lansing, marking only the second time the teams had faced each other since 1979. The No. 3-ranked Spartans jumped out to an early lead and led by as many as 22 in the first half while enjoying a 20-point halftime lead, 46–26. Notre Dame was able to move within eight points in the second half, but the Spartans, led by Winston and Langford's 17 points each, were able to pull away for an easy win. Bridges added 14 points as MSU buried nine three-pointers in the 81–63 win. The win moved the Spartans to 6–1 on the season and a 2–1 record against top ten-ranked teams (only losing to Duke).

=== Early conference games ===
==== Nebraska ====
Due to the Big Ten tournament being held one week earlier to be held at Madison Square Garden, the Spartans began conference play on December 3 against Nebraska. MSU won its sixth straight game, all by at least 18 points, in an 86–57 thrashing of Nebraska. The Spartans held Nebraska to 27% shooting from the field as the MSU defense again dominated the game. Nick Ward, who was in foul trouble, scored 22 points in only 16 minutes to lead the Spartans. Jaren Jackson Jr. scored 15 with 10 rebounds and three blocks. The win moved the Spartans to 7–1 on the season and 1–0 in Big Ten play.

==== Rutgers ====
Two days later on December 5, the Spartans traveled to face Rutgers in New Jersey for the Spartans first true road game of the season. MSU fell behind early 8–0 to the Scarlet Knights, but managed to retake the lead midway through the first half. Rutgers rallied to tie the game at 26 at the half. In the second half, the Spartans were unable to pull away though they had the lead for most of the half as both teams struggled offensively. Miles Bridges scored 21 points while Jackson Jr. tied a single-game Spartan record with eight blocks, but MSU still needed two big three-pointers later in the game by Cassius Winston to pull out the 10-point victory, 62–52. MSU limited Rutgers to 25% shooting on the night, but only made 38% of their own shots while failing to win the rebound battle as both teams had 45 rebounds. Nick Ward, who struggled in the first half, only played a minute and a half in the second half and sat on the bench dejectedly for most of the half. Izzo said he just had a bad game. The win was the Spartans seventh in a row and left the Spartans at 8–1 on the season and 2–0 in Big Ten play.

=== Remaining non-conference games ===
==== Southern Utah ====
The Spartans returned home to play Southern Utah on December 9. Nick Ward scored 17 points a week after only playing 11 minutes while Miles Bridges and Jaren Jackson Jr. each added 17 as well. Despite this, the Thunderbirds were within five points of the Spartans in the second half before MSU pulled away. Jackson added 13 rebounds and five blocks while Cassius Winston scored 15 points with five assists as the Spartans won 88–63. The win, MSU's eighth in a row, moved the Spartans to 9–1 on the season.

Following losses by No. 1 Duke and No. 2 Kansas, it was likely MSU would become the No. 1 team in the country on December 11. However, Villanova was named the No. 1 team in the country in both polls, leapfrogging MSU.

==== Oakland ====
On December 16, the Spartans participated in the Hitachi College Basketball Showcase held at the new Little Caesars Arena in Detroit and took on Oakland. MSU took the early lead in the game, led by Nick Ward who scored 15 points and brought down 15 rebounds in the game. The Spartans continued their strong defensive effort, holding the Grizzlies to 31.3% shooting in the first half. Despite this, MSU only led by five at the half. In the second half, Oakland's hot shooting (40% overall and 46.7% from three) kept the game close every time the Spartans tried to pull away. However, Cassius Winston took over the Spartans, scoring the final 14 points for MSU as the Spartans pulled away for an 86–73 win. Winston scored 19 in the game to lead MSU, but committed six turnovers. Miles Bridges added 11 points while Josh Langford tallied 17. Jaren Jackson Jr. blocked four shots and scored 10 in the win. The win moved MSU to 16–0 all-time against Oakland. MSU won its ninth game in the row and moved to 10–1 on the season.

==== Houston Baptist ====
Returning home, the Spartans welcomed Houston Baptist the Breslin Center on December 18. Miles Bridges tied a career high with 33 points while Nick Ward was perfect from the field in scoring 20 points. The Spartans set a school record with 16 blocks in the game, Jaren Jackson Jr. had six while Ward had five. The Spartans had 30 assists on 36 made baskets while Cassius Winston also set a career high with 12 assists. MSU again played well defensively, holding HBU to 31.6% shooting while Tom Izzo's team shot 70% in the first half. Houston would finish the game at 28.4% in the game as the Spartans kept up their nation-leading field goal defense. MSU blew out the Huskies 107–62, the most points the Spartans had scored since 2011, moving to 11–1 on the season. Despite the easy win, Izzo was disappointed with the Spartans' performance, especially with the fact that HBU out-rebounded MSU on the offensive glass 24–10.

==== Long Beach State ====
On December 21, Long Beach State had no better luck against the Spartans in East Lansing. Miles Bridges scored 17 points and had nine rebounds while Josh Langford also scored 17. Cassius Winston dished out eight assists to go along with 13 points and Jaren Jackson Jr. added 13 points and four blocks. Nick Ward continued his torrid shooting, making seven of his eight shots (making 17 of his last 18 shots) to score 16 in a 102–60 romp over the 49ers. Tom Izzo felt better about his team's performance, but still was upset with the team's 12 turnover, nine coming in the first half. The Spartans scored over 100 points in back-to-back games for the first time since 2004. The win marked MSU's 11th straight, moving their record to 12–1 on the season.

==== Cleveland State ====
On December 28, the Spartans welcomed Cleveland State to the Breslin Center. The Spartans left little doubt in this game as they jumped to an early 32–6 lead on the Vikings. MSU made its first seven shots of the game and shot 72.4% from the field in the first half, leading 63–25 at the half. The 63 points scored in the first half is believed to be the most scored in any half under Tom Izzo. Josh Langford scored 23 to lead the Spartans as they topped 100 points for the third consecutive game, winning easily 111–61. The Spartans continued their strong defensive play, holding Cleveland State to just 32% shooting in the game. Nick Ward made seven of his eight shots, scoring 22 points while Miles Bridges added 18. The win moved the Spartans to 13–1 on the season with one non-conference game remaining.

==== Savannah State ====
On New Year's Eve, Savannah State traveled to East Lansing for the Spartans final non-conference game of the season. MSU jumped to an early lead as Savannah State, number one in the country in three-point attempts, struggled early. However, the Tigers got hot near the midpoint of the first half and kept the score close. The Spartans turned the ball over 10 times in the first ten minutes of the game, but were still able to lead by 13 at half time, 51–38. MSU turned it on in the second half, outscoring the Tigers 57–14, including a 32–0 stretch to close the game and win 108–52. The Spartans scored over 100 points for the fourth game in a row, the longest streak in school history. Miles Bridges had a career-high 21 rebounds, the most by a Spartan since 1976; his 19 defensive rebounds tied the mark set by Antonio Smith in 1997. Nick Ward scored 21 points to lead the Spartans and added 10 rebounds. Ward went nine for nine from the floor on the night and has made 32 of his last 34 shots in the last four games. Cassius Winston dished out a career-high 13 assists to go with his 16 points in the blowout. The win moved the Spartans 14–1 on the season and on the verge of being named the number one team in the country following a loss by Villanova.

On January 1, 2018, the Spartans were named the number one team in the country in the weekly AP poll. On January 2, MSU was also named number one in the weekly coaches' poll.

=== Remaining conference games ===
==== Maryland ====
On January 4, the Spartans welcomed Maryland to East Lansing as conference play resumed. Maryland started well, shooting over 60% from the field in the first 10 minutes of the game. MSU, however, used a 15–0 run near the end of the first half to take a 13-point lead at the half. MSU continued its strong play in the second half, routing the Terrapins 91–61. The Spartans made 16 of 28 three-point attempts while also hitting on 16 of 28 two-point shots. Jaren Jackson Jr. hit five threes, while Kenny Goins made his first career three-point basket, hitting a second three-pointer a few minutes later. Nick Ward continued his strong play, missing only two shots while scoring a team-leading 16 points. Miles Bridges contributed 15 points, six rebounds, and seven assists. Cassius Winston had eight assists as the Spartans had assists on 30 of their 32 field goals. Maryland ended up shooting only 37.7% from the field while the Spartans shot 57.1%. The Spartans did turn the ball over seven times in the game, though six of those occurred in the first half. The win marked MSU's 14th straight win and their seventh straight game scoring over 80 points. MSU remained in first place in the Big Ten with a 3–0 record, moving to 15–1 overall.

==== Ohio State ====
MSU took to the road for only the second time on the season, traveling to face Ohio State on January 7. MSU started well, taking an 11–4 lead before Ohio State battled back. A close game for most of the first half, the Buckeyes took a 12-point lead to the half behind some good shooting and a buzzer-beating three as the half ended. MSU failed to respond in the second half as the Buckeyes continued their run, pushing the lead to as many as 23. MSU, shooting over 50% on the season, shot only 39% from the field in the game while OSU shot over 52% in the 80–64 blowout. Nick Ward only attempted one shot for the Spartans and settled for three points in the game. Miles Bridges had 17, but did not shoot well, making only seven of 19 shots. Josh Langford added 17 as well, but it was not enough for the Spartans who turned the ball over 12 times. After assisting on 30 of 32 baskets against Maryland, the Spartans only had 13 assists on 23 made baskets in the loss. The loss dropped the Spartans out of first place in the Big Ten and dropped them from the No. 1 ranking in the country as they fell to 15–2, 3–1 overall.

==== Rutgers ====
On January 10, MSU looked to return to their winning ways with Rutgers traveling to the Breslin Center. The Spartans started well, taking an early lead, but Rutgers fought back, staying within seven at the half. Miles Bridges struggled on the night, especially in the first half as he failed to score. In the second half, MSU had several long scoreless streaks which allowed the Knights to tie the game and even take the lead near the end of the half. With just over eight second remaining in the game and the Spartans trailing by one point, Bridges was fouled, but only made one of the two free throws to tie the game. On the ensuing play, Rutgers missed a game-winning shot to force overtime. In the first overtime game of the season for the Spartans, Josh Langford hit a big three-pointer to give the Spartans the lead and Cassius Winston hit six free throws down the stretch to seal the 76–72 win for the Spartans. The disappointing performance by the Spartans after getting blown out in the previous game was also the closest game of the season for the Spartans. Nick Ward led the Spartans with 17 and Bridges rebounded to score 11. The win moved the Spartans to 4–1 in conference play and 16–2 overall.

==== Michigan ====
The Spartans next welcomed rival Michigan to the Breslin Center on January 13. MSU played well in the first half, but Michigan kept the score close. In the second half, Michigan's defense continued to dominate MSU and Michigan answered every run by the Spartans. Though MSU shot a better percentage than the Wolverines, Michigan took 11 more shots, thanks in large part to MSU's 18 turnovers in the game. Nick Ward had a disappointing game, only scoring four points in 14 minutes while Cassius Winston only had two assists to go along with four turnovers. Michigan pulled away for the 82–72 win, marking MSU's second loss in the previous three games. Miles Bridges and Jaren Jackson Jr. each had 19 to lead the Spartans, but it was not enough as Michigan big man Moritz Wagner scored 27. The loss dropped MSU to 4–2 in conference and two games behind conference leaders, Purdue and Ohio State.

==== Indiana ====
After a week off, the Spartans returned to play on January 19 against Indiana in East Lansing. The Spartans appeared to return to form as they dominated the Hoosiers for much of the game, leading by 19 at the half and by as many as 30 in the second half. Miles Bridges led all scorers with 22 while Nick Ward added 18 points and 13 rebounds in the win. Jaren Jackson Jr. added three blocks which tied the MSU single-season record for blocks by freshman. Cassius Winston returned to form as well, dishing out eight assists while only committing one turnover. MSU moved to 17–3, 5–2 on the season with the 85–57 win. The Spartans wore special uniforms for the game, black with bright green numbers.

==== Illinois ====
MSU returned to the road to face Illinois on January 22 at the State Farm Center. The Spartans struggled with turnovers throughout the game, turning the ball over 15 times in the first half. However, MSU shot 15 of 19 from the field in the first half, led by Miles Bridges 17 points in the half to take a 39–32 halftime lead. MSU took control of the game in the second half as Jaren Jackson Jr. scored a career-high 21 with 11 rebounds and six blocks to lead the Spartans to an 18-point lead. Turnovers again became a problem late in the second half as the Illini narrowed the lead to eight, but Jackson and Bridges hit 10 straight free throws down the stretch to allow the Spartans to escape with an 87–74 win. The Spartans shot 68.2% from the field in the game, the best shooting percentage of any opponent at the State Farm Center. MSU dominated the boards, out-rebounding Illinois 37–15 in the win and Bridges finished with 31 points. Jackson's six blocks moved him within one for the MSU single-season record. The Spartans turned the ball over 25 times, led by Cassius Winston's eight, the most for a Spartan team since 2005. The win moved the Spartans to 18–3, 6–2 in Big Ten play on the season.

==== Wisconsin ====
The Spartans returned home to face the Wisconsin on January 26. Prior to the game, reports surfaced that Tom Izzo's program had several sexual assault allegations over the prior ten years, though Izzo was never accused of wrongdoing. MSU Athletic Director Mark Hollis also resigned early in the day. Due to this and the Larry Nassar sexual assault scandal, the Izzone wore teal shirts to show support for survivors of sexual assault. The Spartans started well, leading by as many as 18 in the first half with a 37–21 half time lead. Wisconsin brought the game to within six in the second half, but MSU was able to control the game. Miles Bridges led all scorers with 24 and Wisconsin's Ian Happ scored 22 of this 23 points in the second half to prevent the game from turning into a rout. The Spartans cruised to a 76–61 win, moving to 19–3, 7–2 in Big Ten play on the season. After the game, Izzo did not comment much on the sexual assault allegations, but stated that he was not planning on retiring and that he wanted be part of the healing process.

==== Maryland ====
Returning to the road less than 48 hours later, the Spartans traveled to face Maryland. MSU did not lead in the first half as Maryland was able to keep a lead throughout and pushed the lead to 13 at halftime. The Spartans answered to start the second half, taking the lead and leading by as many as eight. Josh Langford scored 19 for the Spartans as Nick Ward (seven points) and Miles Bridges (11 points) each struggled. Cassius Winston overcame a rough start to score 13 as the Spartans cut down their turnovers, committing only 10. MSU held on for the 74–68 win, sweeping Maryland on the season to move to 20–3 and 8–2 on the season. Izzo was again questioned after the game regarding sexual assault reports, but again refused to say much.

==== Penn State ====
The Spartans returned home to face Penn State on January 31. MSU again struggled in the first half, scoring only 24 points for the second consecutive game and shooting only 37% from the field. As a result, they trailed by six at the half. The Nittany Lions pushed the lead to 12 early in the second half as it appeared the distractions surrounding the program were causing issues. However, MSU outscored Penn State 41–14 from there to win 76–68. Miles Bridges scored 23 while Cassius Winston scored 15 and had 10 assists. The Spartans continued their nation-leading defensive play holding PSU to 37% from the field in the game while MSU finished at 50%. The Spartans did turn the ball over 16 times with most coming in the first half as they trailed throughout the half. The win moved MSU to 21–3, 9–2 on the season. The win also moved Tom Izzo into a second-place tie with Gene Keady for most Big Ten wins.

==== Indiana ====
MSU finished the season with five of their last seven games on the road, starting with a trip to Indiana on February 3. The Spartans avoided another slow start and took an early lead against the Hoosiers in Bloomington. MSU held Indiana to only 28% shooting from the field and led by as many as 11 in the first half and led by eight at halftime. In the second half, the Spartans held their lead at about 10 for most of the game. Matt McQuaid scored 12 to lead MSU on four of five shooting from behind the arc to help secure the 63–60 win. Tom Izzo was disappointed in the team's performance as the Spartans were outrebounded by 24 including a 25–3 deficit on the offensive boards. MSU shot only 41% from the free throw line which allowed Indiana to pull the game within three and, after Cassius Winston missed two free throws with seconds remaining, allowed the Hoosiers to get a last-second heave to attempt to tie the game. The win moved the Spartans to 22–3, 10–2 on the season. The 22–3 start for the Spartans marked the best start for MSU since 2001. The win also marked Izzo's 266th Big Ten win, moving him in to sole possession of second place in Big Ten wins, trailing only Bob Knight.

==== Iowa ====
MSU traveled to face Iowa on February 6, marking their fifth game in 12 days. MSU started well, taking an early lead, but foul trouble for Nick Ward and Jaren Jackson Jr. limited their effectiveness in the first half as they sat out for more than 10 minutes. MSU, despite not playing great defense, took the halftime lead 48–42. Iowa closed the lead early in the second half and led by as many as eight before MSU narrowed the lead. Ward, who scored 17 points in only 12 minutes, missed much of the half with four fouls and Cassius Winston also sat for eight minutes due to poor play. Kenny Goins hit a three-pointer with just over two minutes remaining to give MSU a 90–89 lead. However, Iowa retook the lead before Miles Bridges hit two free throws with over a minute remaining to give MSU the lead. Josh Langford made two free throws to extend the lead to 96–93 with six seconds remaining and Bridges stole the ensuing Iowa pass before being fouled. Needing only one free throw to seal the game, Bridges missed both and Iowa's Nicholas Baer missed a half-court heave to tie it as the Spartans pulled out the 96–93 win. Bridges led the Spartans with 25 points and Langford added 15 while Winston scored nine points and had eight assists. Tom Izzo was disappointed in his team's defense but happy with the win in the rough stretch of the schedule. The win moved the Spartans to 23–3 and 11–2 in Big Ten play.

==== Purdue ====
MSU welcomed Big Ten co-leader Purdue to the Breslin Center on February 10 for a Jud Heathcote tribute game. The Boilermakers, having lost to Ohio State earlier in the week and dropping into a tie with the Buckeyes in the Big Ten, started out well, leading by as many as 10 in the first half as big man Isaac Haas seemingly scored at will against the Spartans. MSU chose not to double Haas throughout the game, choosing to try to limit Purdue's three-point shooting. At halftime, however, the Spartans trailed 36–31. In the second half, MSU settled on Gavin Schilling to guard Haas who still scored a game-high 25 points. However, Purdue, who had shot 42% in the first half, shot only 37% in the second and made zero three-pointers. MSU was able to tighten the score and take the lead, but still trailed by two when Kenny Goins hit a jumper to tie the game at 65 with 49 seconds remaining. Haas, with Schilling guarding him, missed a shot on the ensuing possession and MSU called timeout with 20 seconds remaining. Miles Bridges, who scored 20 in the game, took the ball and hit a three-pointer over Dakota Mathias to give MSU the 68–65 lead with seven seconds remaining. A foul on the in bounds play and a missed free throw by Vince Edwards sealed the win for the Spartans. The 68–65 win moved MSU to 24–3, 12–2 in Big Ten play and into a tie for second with Purdue, still one game behind conference-leading Ohio State. At halftime of the game, Steve Smith and other former MSU players paid tribute to former head coach Jud Heathcote and former Purdue coach Gene Keady paid his respects as well.

On February 11, the Spartans, somewhat surprisingly, were give only a number three seed in an early NCAA Tournament preview of the top 16 seeds. Purdue, having just lost two games, was still named a number one seed.

On February 12, Michigan State was ranked number one in the Coaches Poll, receiving 17 of 32 first place votes. They were ranked number two in the AP poll, receiving 21 of 65 first place votes.

==== Minnesota ====
The Spartans traveled to Minneapolis to face Minnesota with four games remaining in the regular season looking to avoid a letdown after beating Purdue in the prior game. The Spartans started the game off hot, shooting lights out from three as they made their first six three-pointers (three by Winston, two by Jackson Jr. and one by Bridges) to jump out to an 18–6 lead. MSU continued to shoot well from three, making 10 of 12 three-pointers in the first half to lead 43–25 in the first half. Jackson led the Spartans with a career-high 27 points while Ward, who struggled in the first half, scored 11 of his 13 points in the second half. MSU dominated the glass against the overmatched Gophers, outrebounding them 49–22. Minnesota shot only 32% from the field as MSU shot over 53%, including 63%, from three in the 87–57 rout of the Gophers. The win moved MSU to 25–3 overall, the school's best-ever start, as they moved to 13–2 in conference play.

==== Northwestern ====
With three games remaining in the season, MSU traveled to play Northwestern at Allstate Arena on February 17. Following losses by Purdue and Ohio State earlier in the week, MSU entered the game with a chance to move into a first place tie with Ohio State with a win. However, the Spartans fell behind early as Northwestern shot 60% from the field in the first half and led by as many as 27 in the half. Michigan State trailed by 22 at the half as it looked like they would fail to take first place. However, MSU held Northwestern to 11 points in the second half as they surged back to tie the game behind Winston's 17 points, including five three-pointers. Jackson's three-point play with 5:36 remaining in the game gave the Spartans their first lead of the game at 56–53. Four made free throws by Miles Bridges with less than a minute remaining sealed the 65–60 win in front of a largely pro-Michigan State crowd. Northwestern made only three of their 26 field goals in the second half, shooting less than 12% in the half. The 27-point comeback win was the largest comeback win in Big Ten history and, at the time, the fifth largest all-time in Division I history. The win moved MSU to 26–3 on the season and 14–2 in conference play. The win and an Ohio State loss the following day put the Spartans in first place by themselves with only two games remaining in the regular season.

==== Illinois ====
The Spartans returned home for Senior Night against Illinois on February 20 with a chance to clinch at least a share of the Big Ten title for the first time since 2012. Because it was senior night, seniors Ben Carter, Lourawls "Tum Tum" Nairn Jr., and Gavin Schilling started the game for the Spartans, only the third different starting lineup on the season. MSU started slow, but took a three-point lead at the half against the Illini who made six three-pointers in the first half. However, in the second half, the Spartans took control, pushing the lead to more than 20 in the easy win. Bridges led the Spartans with 19 points on what was his last game at the Breslin Center. Jackson, also in his last game in East Lansing, scored eight and had five blocks in only 18 minutes. Langford added 16 points while Winston added 12 in the 81–61 win. The win moved the Spartans to 27–3, 15–2 on the season and gave them at least a share of the Big Ten title with one game remaining against Wisconsin. After the game, the Spartans were happy with the title as they raised a championship banner, but stated they wanted to do more on the season.

==== Wisconsin ====
Looking to win the Big Ten title outright, the Spartans traveled to Wisconsin on February 25 for the final regular season game. Prior to the game, reports surfaced that Miles Bridges had been paid to attend Michigan State, among other allegations. MSU conducted an investigation and presented their findings to the NCAA, who cleared Bridges, ruling him eligible to play against the Badgers. The Spartans started off well, taking an early lead, but Wisconsin shot the ball well in the first half. Despite this, the Spartans did not trail until midway through the second half. Cassius Winston went six for six from three, scoring 20 points to lead the Spartans to the 68–63 win. Nick Ward added 14 points while Bridges added 10 as MSU held Wisconsin to 37% shooting. The win moved the Spartans to 16–2 in the Big Ten, marking the most conference wins in school history as the Spartans clinched the Big Ten title outright for the first time since 2009. The Spartans also moved to 28–3 on the season, the most regular season wins in school history.

== Postseason ==
=== Big Ten tournament ===
==== Wisconsin ====
As the No. 1 seed in the Big Ten tournament held at Madison Square Garden, MSU faced Wisconsin in the quarterfinals on March 2 following the Badgers' win over Maryland the day before. In the second meeting between the two teams in five days, the Spartans took the early lead and led the majority of the first half, but, as in their last meeting, the Badgers kept the game close. A 32–28 halftime lead for the Spartans preceded a second half where the lead shifted back and forth. Miles Bridges scored 20 for the Spartans while Cassius Winston added 17. With 20 seconds remaining in the game and the Spartans leading by three, the Badgers could not get off a good shot as the Spartan defense limited them to a long three-point attempt which fell short. The 63–60 win, the Spartans eighth straight year with at least a win in the Big Ten tournament, moved the Spartans to the semifinals to face Michigan.

==== Michigan ====
On March 3, the Spartans faced their rivals, Michigan, looking to avenge an early season loss at the Breslin Center. The Wolverines started well, taking an early eight point lead in the first half. However, MSU fought back and took a three-point lead at the half. Miles Bridges scored 17 for the Spartans, including showing a strong post presence, but it was not enough as MSU could not overcome Michigan's defense. Michigan limited MSU to 38% shooting including only 28% from three. The Wolverines beat the Spartans for the second time on the season and ended any real chance for the Spartans to receive a No. 1 seed in the NCAA tournament. The loss ended MSU's 13-game winning streak.

=== NCAA Tournament ===
Due to the Big Ten tournament being held a week early, the Spartans had to wait for more than a week before NCAA Tournament pairings were announced and at least 13 days before their next game. For the 21st consecutive year, Michigan State received an invitation to the NCAA Tournament. As the No. 3 seed in the Midwest region, the Spartans learned they would face Bucknell at Little Caesars Arena in Detroit on March 16. The Spartans previously played at Little Caesars Arena in December when they defeated Oakland.

==== Bucknell ====
On March 16, the Spartans took on Bucknell in Detroit. MSU took an early lead in the first half, but were unable to put Bucknell away. MSU did lead 44–40 at the half and extended the lead in the second half, leading by as many as 16 as Miles Bridges took control of the game. Bridges scored 29 to lead all scorers while Josh Langford added 22. Bucknell scored 15 points on five three-pointers with less than 90 seconds remaining, including one at the buzzer, to narrow the margin to a four-point victory at 82–78. Xavier Tillman was the only non-starter to score for MSU.

==== Syracuse ====
In the second round, MSU took on No. 11-seeded Syracuse and their zone two days later. After scoring 44 points in the first half of the previous game, the Spartans managed only 25 points in the first half as they struggled to deal with the Syracuse zone. Despite their struggles, the Orange were unable to take the lead until just over four minutes remained in the game. MSU attempted a season-high 37 three-pointers, making only eight of them as they struggled to find shots. Bridges went 4–18 from the field, while Cassius Winston went 4–12 and Langford went 1–12. As a result, MSU fell to the Orange to end their season 55–53. Following the game, Bridges, Jaren Jackson Jr., and Nick Ward declined to address the possibility of them going to the NBA.

== Roster ==
2017–18 Michigan State Spartans men's basketball team
Players
Coaches

Pos.	#	Name	Height	Weight	Year	Previous school	Hometown
G	0	Kyle Ahrens (injured) (redshirt)	6 ft 5 in (1.96 m)	215 lb (98 kg)	Jr	Versailles H.S.	Versailles, OH
F	22	Miles Bridges (C)	6 ft 7 in (2.01 m)	230 lb (104 kg)	So	Huntington Prep	Flint, MI
F/C	40	Braden Burke (W) (redshirt)	6 ft 11 in (2.11 m)	220 lb (100 kg)	So	Stevensville H.S./Robert Morris	Stevensville, MI
F	13	Ben Carter	6 ft 9 in (2.06 m)	225 lb (102 kg)	GS	Bishop Gorman/Oregon/UNLV	Las Vegas, NV
G	41	Connor George	6 ft 3 in (1.91 m)	200 lb (91 kg)	RS Fr	Okemos H.S.	Okemos, MI
F	25	Kenny Goins	6 ft 6 in (1.98 m)	230 lb (104 kg)	RS Jr	Warren Mott H.S.	Troy, MI
G	10	Jack Hoiberg (W) (redshirt)	5 ft 9 in (1.75 m)	175 lb (79 kg)	Fr	Hinsdale Central H.S.	Hinsdale, IL
C	2	Jaren Jackson Jr.	6 ft 11 in (2.11 m)	225 lb (102 kg)	Fr	La Lumiere School	Indianapolis, IN
G	1	Joshua Langford	6 ft 5 in (1.96 m)	210 lb (95 kg)	So	Madison Academy	Madison, AL
F	20	Matt McQuaid	6 ft 5 in (1.96 m)	200 lb (91 kg)	Jr	Duncanville H.S.	Duncanville, TX
G	11	Lourawls Nairn, Jr. (C)	5 ft 10 in (1.78 m)	175 lb (79 kg)	Sr	Sunrise Christian Academy	Nassau, Bahamas
F	34	Gavin Schilling	6 ft 9 in (2.06 m)	240 lb (109 kg)	RS Sr	Findlay Prep	Chicago, IL
C	23	Xavier Tillman	6 ft 9 in (2.06 m)	250 lb (113 kg)	Fr	Grand Rapids Christian H.S.	Grand Rapids, MI
F	44	Nick Ward	6 ft 8 in (2.03 m)	250 lb (113 kg)	So	Gahanna Lincoln	Gahanna, OH
G	14	Brock Washington (W) (redshirt)	6 ft 4 in (1.93 m)	175 lb (79 kg)	Fr	Southfield Christian School	Detroit, MI
G	5	Cassius Winston	6 ft 1 in (1.85 m)	185 lb (84 kg)	So	University of Detroit Jesuit	Detroit, MI

Head coach

- Tom Izzo (Northern Michigan)

Assistant coach(es)

- Dwayne Stephens (Michigan State)
- Dane Fife (Indiana)
- Mike Garland (Northern Michigan)

Legend

- (C) Team captain
- (S) Suspended
- (I) Ineligible
- (W) Walk-on
- Injured
- Current redshirt

Roster

=== Depth chart ===
Pos.	Starting 5	Bench 1	Bench 2
C	Nick Ward	Gavin Schilling	Xavier Tillman
PF	Jaren Jackson Jr.	Kenny Goins	Ben Carter
SF	Miles Bridges
SG	Joshua Langford	Matt McQuaid
PG	Cassius Winston	Lourawls Nairn Jr.

== Schedule and results ==
The 2018 Big Ten tournament was held at Madison Square Garden in New York City. Due to the Big East's use of that venue for their conference tournament, the Big Ten tournament took place one week earlier than usual, ending the week before Selection Sunday. This resulted in teams having nearly two weeks off before the NCAA tournament. As a result, it the Big Ten regular season will begin in early Dec. A previously scheduled road game against Florida was moved to the 2018–19 season due to scheduling conflicts.

Date time, TV	Rank^{#}	Opponent^{#}	Result	Record	High points	High rebounds	High assists	Site (attendance) city, state
Exhibition
Oct 26, 2017*; 7:00 pm, BTN Plus		Ferris State	W 80–72		26 – Winston	8 – Jackson Jr.	5 – Winston	Breslin Center (14,797); East Lansing, MI
Oct 29, 2017*; 2:00 pm		vs. Georgia; Hurricane charity relief	W 80–68		21 – Bridges	10 – Bridges	10 – Winston	Van Andel Arena (10,699); Grand Rapids, MI
Nov 3, 2017*; 7:00 pm, BTN Plus	No. 2	Hillsdale	W 75–44		14 – Ward	13 – Ward	6 – Winston	Breslin Center (14,797); East Lansing, MI
Regular season
Nov 10, 2017*; 8:00 pm, BTN	No. 2	North Florida	W 98–66	1–0	20 – Bridges	13 – Jackson Jr.	8 – Winston	Breslin Center (14,797); East Lansing, MI
Nov 14, 2017*; 7:00 pm, ESPN	No. 2	vs. No. 1 Duke; Champions Classic	L 81–88	1–1	19 – Bridges/Jackson Jr./Ward	7 – Jackson Jr.	11 – Winston	United Center (21,684); Chicago, IL
Nov 19, 2017*; 4:00 pm, BTN	No. 2	Stony Brook; Phil Knight Invitational campus game	W 93–71	2–1	22 – Ward	11 – Ward	6 – Winston	Breslin Center (14,797); East Lansing, MI
Nov 23, 2017*; 11:30 pm, ESPN	No. 4	vs. DePaul; Phil Knight Invitational Victory Bracket quarterfinals	W 73–51	3–1	20 – McQuaid	10 – Jackson Jr.	8 – Winston	Moda Center (13,439); Portland, OR
Nov 24, 2017*; 11:59 pm, ESPN	No. 4	vs. UConn; Phil Knight Invitational Victory Bracket semifinals	W 77–57	4–1	28 – Winston	10 – Jackson Jr.	5 – Winston	Veterans Memorial Coliseum (8,853); Portland, OR
Nov 26, 2017*; 8:30 pm, ESPN	No. 4	vs. No. 9 North Carolina; Phil Knight Invitational Victory Bracket championship game	W 63–45	5–1	23 – Langford	8 – Ward	7 – Winston	Moda Center (19,413); Portland, OR
Nov 30, 2017*; 7:00 pm, ESPN	No. 3	No. 5 Notre Dame; ACC–Big Ten Challenge	W 81–63	6–1	17 – Langford/Winston	6 – Bridges	6 – Winston	Breslin Center (14,797); East Lansing, MI
Dec 3, 2017; 4:30 pm, FS1	No. 3	Nebraska	W 86–57	7–1 (1–0)	22 – Ward	10 – Jackson Jr.	7 – Winston	Breslin Center (14,797); East Lansing, MI
Dec 5, 2017; 7:00 pm, BTN	No. 3	at Rutgers	W 62–52	8–1 (2–0)	21 – Bridges	8 – Schilling	6 – Nairn Jr.	Louis Brown Athletic Center (6,020); Piscataway, NJ
Dec 9, 2017*; 6:00 pm, BTN	No. 3	Southern Utah	W 88–63	9–1	17 – Bridges/Jackson Jr./Ward	13 – Jackson Jr.	6 – Bridges	Breslin Center (14,797); East Lansing, MI
Dec 16, 2017*; 2:30 pm, ESPNU	No. 2	vs. Oakland; Hitachi College Basketball Showcase	W 86–73	10–1	19 – Winston	15 – Ward	7 – Goins	Little Caesars Arena (20,695); Detroit, MI
Dec 18, 2017*; 6:00 pm, BTN	No. 2	Houston Baptist	W 107–62	11–1	33 – Bridges	8 – Jackson Jr.	12 – Winston	Breslin Center (14,797); East Lansing, MI
Dec 21, 2017*; 7:00 pm, BTN Plus	No. 2	Long Beach State	W 102–60	12–1	17 – Bridges/Langford	9 – Bridges	8 – Winston	Breslin Center (14,797); East Lansing, MI
Dec 29, 2017*; 6:00 pm, BTN	No. 2	Cleveland State	W 111–61	13–1	23 – Langford	14 – Ward	7 – Bridges	Breslin Center (14,797); East Lansing, MI
Dec 31, 2017*; 12:00 pm, BTN	No. 2	Savannah State	W 108–52	14–1	21 – Ward	21 – Bridges	13 – Winston	Breslin Center (14,797); East Lansing, MI
Jan 4, 2018; 8:00 pm, FS1	No. 1	Maryland	W 91–61	15–1 (3–0)	16 – Ward	7 – McQuaid	8 – Winston	Breslin Center (14,797); East Lansing, MI
Jan 7, 2018; 4:30 pm, CBS	No. 1	at Ohio State	L 64–80	15–2 (3–1)	17 – Bridges/Langford	10 – Ward	6 – Winston	Value City Arena (17,599); Columbus, OH
Jan 10, 2018; 7:00 pm, BTN	No. 4	Rutgers	W 76–72 ^{OT}	16–2 (4–1)	17 – Ward	10 – Ward	7 – Winston	Breslin Center (14,797); East Lansing, MI
Jan 13, 2018; 12:00 pm, FOX	No. 4	Michigan; Rivalry	L 72–82	16–3 (4–2)	19 – Bridges/Jackson Jr.	6 – Bridges/Schilling	5 – Bridges	Breslin Center (14,797); East Lansing, MI
Jan 19, 2018; 7:00 pm, FS1	No. 9	Indiana	W 85–57	17–3 (5–2)	22 – Bridges	13 – Ward	8 – Winston	Breslin Center (14,797); East Lansing, MI
Jan 22, 2018; 9:00 pm, FS1	No. 6	at Illinois	W 87–74	18–3 (6–2)	31 – Bridges	11 – Jackson Jr.	8 – Winston	State Farm Center (13,552); Champaign, IL
Jan 26, 2018; 8:00 pm, FS1	No. 6	Wisconsin	W 76–61	19–3 (7–2)	24 – Bridges	11 – Ward	6 – Winston	Breslin Center (14,797); East Lansing, MI
Jan 28, 2018; 1:00 pm, CBS	No. 6	at Maryland	W 74–68	20–3 (8–2)	19 – Langford	12 – Ward	5 – Winston	Xfinity Center (17,950); College Park, MD
Jan 31, 2018; 6:30 pm, BTN	No. 5	Penn State	W 76–68	21–3 (9–2)	23 – Bridges	9 – Bridges/Ward	10 – Winston	Breslin Center (14,797); East Lansing, MI
Feb 3, 2018; 7:15 pm, ESPN	No. 5	at Indiana	W 63–60	22–3 (10–2)	12 – McQuaid	8 – Bridges	7 – Winston	Simon Skjodt Assembly Hall (17,222); Bloomington, IN
Feb 6, 2018; 9:00 pm, ESPN	No. 4	at Iowa	W 96–93	23–3 (11–2)	25 – Bridges	9 – Goins	8 – Winston	Carver–Hawkeye Arena (11,350); Iowa City, IA
Feb 10, 2018; 4:00 pm, ESPN	No. 4	No. 3 Purdue; Jud Heathcote Tribute Game	W 68–65	24–3 (12–2)	20 – Bridges	7 – Winston/Schilling	10 – Winston	Breslin Center (14,797); East Lansing, MI
Feb 13, 2018; 9:00 pm, ESPN2	No. 2	at Minnesota	W 87–57	25–3 (13–2)	27 – Jackson Jr.	9 – Ward	5 – Winston	Williams Arena (12,218); Minneapolis, MN
Feb 17, 2018; 2:00 pm, FOX	No. 2	at Northwestern	W 65–60	26–3 (14–2)	17 – Winston	10 – Ward	7 – Winston	Allstate Arena (12,114); Rosemont, IL
Feb 20, 2018; 7:00 pm, ESPN	No. 2	Illinois	W 81–61	27–3 (15–2)	19 – Bridges	7 – Ward	5 – Winston/Langford	Breslin Center (14,797); East Lansing, MI
Feb 25, 2018; 1:00 pm, CBS	No. 2	at Wisconsin	W 68–63	28–3 (16–2)	20 – Winston	8 – Bridges	5 – Winston	Kohl Center (17,287); Madison, WI
Big Ten tournament
Mar 2, 2018; 12:00 pm, BTN	(1) No. 2	vs. (9) Wisconsin; Quarterfinals	W 63–60	29–3	20 – Bridges	9 – Bridges	5 – Winston	Madison Square Garden (14,260); New York, NY
Mar 3, 2018; 2:00 pm, CBS	(1) No. 2	vs. (5) No. 15 Michigan; Semifinals	L 64–75	29–4	17 – Bridges	7 – Bridges/Jackson Jr./Langford	5 – Winston	Madison Square Garden (19,812); New York, NY
NCAA tournament
Mar 16, 2018*; 7:10 pm, CBS	(3 MW) No. 5	vs. (14 MW) Bucknell; First Round	W 82–78	30–4	29 – Bridges	9 – Bridges	10 – Winston	Little Caesars Arena (20,314); Detroit, MI
Mar 18, 2018*; 2:40 pm, CBS	(3 MW) No. 5	vs. (11 MW) Syracuse; Second Round	L 53–55	30–5	15 – Winston	12 – Tillman	6 – Winston	Little Caesars Arena (20,360); Detroit, MI
*Non-conference game. ^{#}Rankings from AP Poll. (#) Tournament seedings in parentheses. MW=Midwest. All times are in Eastern Time.

== Player statistics ==
Individual player statistics (FINAL)
			Minutes		Scoring		Total FGs			3-point FGs			Free-Throws			Rebounds							
Player	GP	GS	Tot	Avg	Pts	Avg	FG	FGA	Pct	3FG	3FA	Pct	FT	FTA	Pct	Off	Def	Tot	Avg	A	Stl	Blk	TO
Bridges, Miles	34	33	1067	31.4	582	17.1	209	457	.457	71	195	.364	93	109	.853	43	194	237	7.0	92	21	26	67
Carter, Ben	23	1	178	7.7	15	0.7	7	17	.412	0	1	.000	1	7	.143	8	20	28	1.2	20	3	5	8
George, Conner	16	0	54	3.4	6	0.4	3	15	.200	0	8	.000	0	2	.000	7	11	18	1.1	0	3	0	2
Goins, Kenny	31	0	431	13.9	65	2.1	27	59	.458	4	15	.267	7	11	.636	25	63	88	2.8	37	12	22	16
Jackson Jr., Jaren	35	34	764	21.8	382	10.9	119	232	.513	38	96	.396	106	133	.797	52	151	203	5.8	39	21	106	62
Langford, Joshua	35	35	949	27.1	410	11.7	152	354	.429	44	109	.404	62	73	.849	28	77	105	3.0	54	13	3	52
McQuaid, Matt	35	2	718	20.5	211	6.0	67	165	.406	52	133	.391	25	29	.862	26	42	68	1.9	45	11	3	25
Nairn, Lourawls	35	1	583	16.7	60	1.7	27	54	.500	5	16	.313	1	5	.200	0	32	32	0.9	102	8	2	29
Schilling, Gavin	34	1	329	9.7	100	2.9	36	51	.706	0	0		28	48	.583	40	76	116	2.2	12	8	12	22
Tillman, Xavier	35	0	305	8.7	99	2.8	39	60	.650	0	0		21	32	.656	35	57	92	1.6	10	9	23	16
Ward, Nick	35	34	662	18.9	435	12.4	162	250	.648	1	1	1.000	110	177	.621	94	155	249	7.1	18	11	47	58
Winston, Cassius	35	34	985	28.1	442	12.6	143	282	.507	75	151	.497	81	90	.900	7	111	118	3.4	241	23	2	87
Team																29	36	65					
Total	35		7025		2807	80.2	991	1996	.496	290	725	.400	535	715	717	401	1038	1439	41.1	670	143	251	459
Opponents	35		7025		2271	64.9	774	2108	.367	252	748	.337	471	647	.728	369	689	1058	30.2	419	207	88	349

Legend
GP	Games played	GS	Games started	Avg	Average per game
FG	Field-goals made	FGA	Field-goal attempts	Off	Offensive rebounds
Def	Defensive rebounds	A	Assists	TO	Turnovers
Blk	Blocks	Stl	Steals	High	Team high

== Rankings ==
Ranking movements Legend: ██ Increase in ranking ██ Decrease in ranking ( ) = First-place votes
	Week																			
Poll	Pre	1	2	3	4	5	6	7	8	9	10	11	12	13	14	15	16	17	18	Final
AP	2 (13)	2 (13)	4	3	3	2 (19)	2 (15)	2 (16)	1 (43)	4	9	6	5	4	2 (20)	2 (19)	2 (17)	4	5	Not released
Coaches	2 (9)	2 (9)^	5	3	3 (1)	2 (10)	2 (6)	2 (5)	1 (25)	4	9	6	4	4	1 (17)	1 (20)	2 (15)	5	5	11

^Coaches Poll did not release a Week 2 poll at the same time AP did.
*AP does not release post-NCAA tournament rankings.

== Awards and honors ==
=== In-season awards ===
Name	Award	Date	Source
Miles Bridges	Big Ten Player of the Week	December 26, 2017	
Miles Bridges	Big Ten Player of the Week	February 12, 2018	
Jaren Jackson Jr.	Big Ten Freshman of the Week	November 27, 2017	
Jaren Jackson Jr.	Big Ten Freshman of the Week	December 11, 2017	
Jaren Jackson Jr.	Big Ten Freshman of the Week	January 15, 2018	
Jaren Jackson Jr.	Big Ten Freshman of the Week	January 29, 2018	
Nick Ward	Big Ten Player of the Week	January 2, 2018	

=== Post-season awards ===
==== Miles Bridges ====
- All-Big Ten First Team (unanimous media and coaches)
- Sporting News Second Team All-American
- USBWA Second Team All-American
- USBWA All-District V Team
- AP Second Team All-American

==== Jaren Jackson Jr. ====
- Big Ten Freshman of the Year
- Big Ten Defensive Player of the Year
- All-Big Ten Third Team (media and coaches)
- All-Big Ten Freshmen Team
- All-Big Ten Defensive Team

==== Nick Ward ====
- All-Big Ten Third Team (media)
- All-Big Ten Honorable Mention (coaches)

==== Cassius Winston ====
- All-Big Ten Third Team (media and coaches)
- USBWA All-District V Team
