= 2016–17 Michigan State Spartans men's basketball team =

American college basketball season

2016–17 Michigan State Spartans men's basketball

NCAA tournament, Second Round
- Conference: Big Ten Conference
- Record: 20–15 (10–8 Big Ten)
- Head coach: Tom Izzo (22nd season)
- Associate head coach: Dwayne Stephens (14th season)
- Assistant coaches: Mike Garland (17th year overall; 10th consecutive season); Dane Fife (6th season)
- Captains: Lourawls Nairn Jr.; Eron Harris
- Home arena: Breslin Center

2016–17 Big Ten Conference men's basketball standings
	Conf.				Overall
Team	W		L	PCT	W		L	PCT
No. 15 Purdue	14	–	4	.778	27	–	8	.771
No. 25 Wisconsin	12	–	6	.667	27	–	10	.730
Maryland	12	–	6	.667	24	–	9	.727
Minnesota	11	–	7	.611	24	–	10	.706
No. 23 Michigan †	10	–	8	.556	26	–	12	.684
Northwestern	10	–	8	.556	24	–	12	.667
Michigan State	10	–	8	.556	20	–	15	.571
Iowa	10	–	8	.556	19	–	15	.559
Illinois	8	–	10	.444	20	–	15	.571
Ohio State	7	–	11	.389	17	–	15	.531
Indiana	7	–	11	.389	18	–	16	.529
Penn State	6	–	12	.333	15	–	18	.455
Nebraska	6	–	12	.333	12	–	19	.387
Rutgers	3	–	15	.167	15	–	18	.455
† 2017 Big Ten tournament winner Rankings from AP poll

The 2016–17 Michigan State Spartans men's basketball team represented Michigan State University in the 2016–17 NCAA Division I men's basketball season. The Spartans, led by 22nd-year head coach Tom Izzo, played their home games at the Breslin Center in East Lansing, Michigan and were members of the Big Ten Conference.

They finished the season 20–15, 10–8 in Big Ten play to finish in a tie for fifth place. In the Big Ten tournament, they defeated Penn State in the second round before losing to Minnesota in the quarterfinals. They received a bid to the NCAA tournament as a No. 9 seed in the Midwest region. The bid marked the 20th straight bid to the NCAA Tournament for the Spartans, the fourth-longest streak ever and third-longest active streak. They defeated No. 8-seeded Miami in the First Round before losing to No. 1-seeded Kansas in the Second Round. The 15 losses by MSU were the second most ever under Tom Izzo, behind only his 16 losses in his first season as head coach at MSU.

== Previous season ==
The Spartans finished the 2015–16 season with a record of 29–6, 13–5 to finish in second place in Big Ten play. MSU won the Big Ten tournament and received the conference's automatic bid to the NCAA tournament, their 19th straight trip to the Tournament. As a No. 2 seed in the Midwest Region, they were upset by No. 15 seed Middle Tennessee in the First Round.

The Spartans were led by Player of the Year winner Denzel Valentine, 19.2 points, 7.8 assists, and 7.5 rebounds per game, Bryn Forbes, 14.4 points per game, and Matt Costello, 10.7 points and 8.2 rebounds per game.

== Offseason ==
=== Departures ===
The Spartans lost their top three scorers from the previous season in Valentine, Forbes, and Costello, all seniors. Deyonta Davis declared for the NBA draft, leaving after only one season with the Spartans. Davis became only the second player to leave MSU for the NBA after just one year. Javon Bess and Marvin Clark also announced they would transfer to another school. In all, five of the Spartans top six scorers from 2015 to 2016 did not return.

Name	Number	Pos.	Height	Weight	Year	Hometown	Notes
Javon Bess	2	F	6'5"	220	Sophomore	Gahanna, OH	Transferred
Marvin Clark	15	F	6'6"	230	Sophomore	Blue Springs, MO	Transferred
Matt Costello	10	F	6'9"	240	Senior	Bay City, MI	Graduated
Deyonta Davis	23	F	6'10"	240	Freshman	Muskegon, MI	Declared for NBA draft
Bryn Forbes	5	G	6'3"	190	RS Senior	Lansing, MI	Graduated/NBA
Denzel Valentine	45	G	6'5"	220	Senior	Lansing, MI	Graduated/NBA Draft

=== Transfers ===
On May 4, 2016, UNLV graduate transfer, Ben Carter, announced he would transfer to Michigan State. He was eligible to play immediately. Carter, a 6-foot 9 inch forward, averaged 8.6 points, 6 rebounds and 1.4 blocks in 24 minutes per game prior to a knee injury the previous year.

=== Recruiting class ===
Recruits at the 2016 McDonald's All-American Boys Game

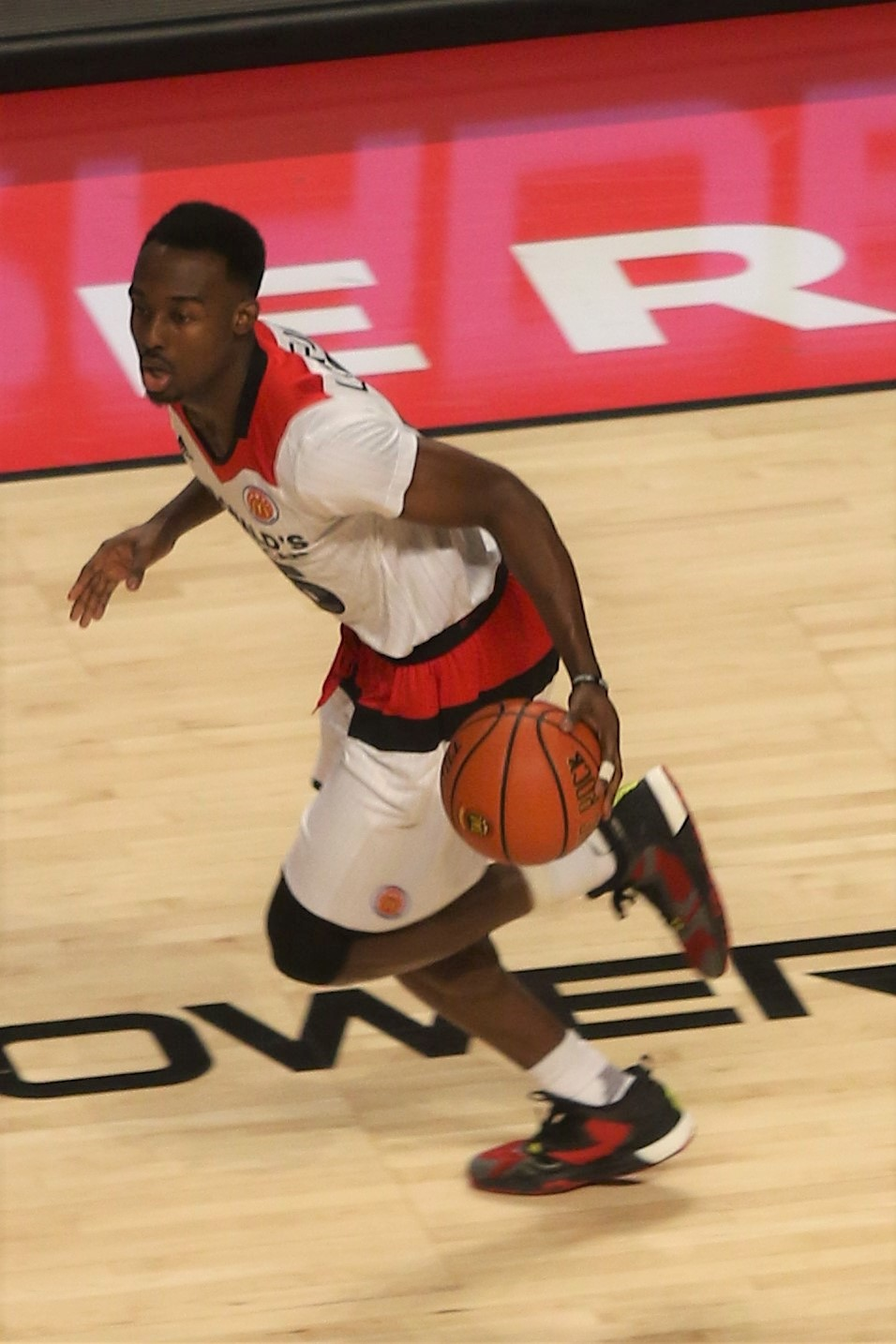
Joshua Langford, Michigan State

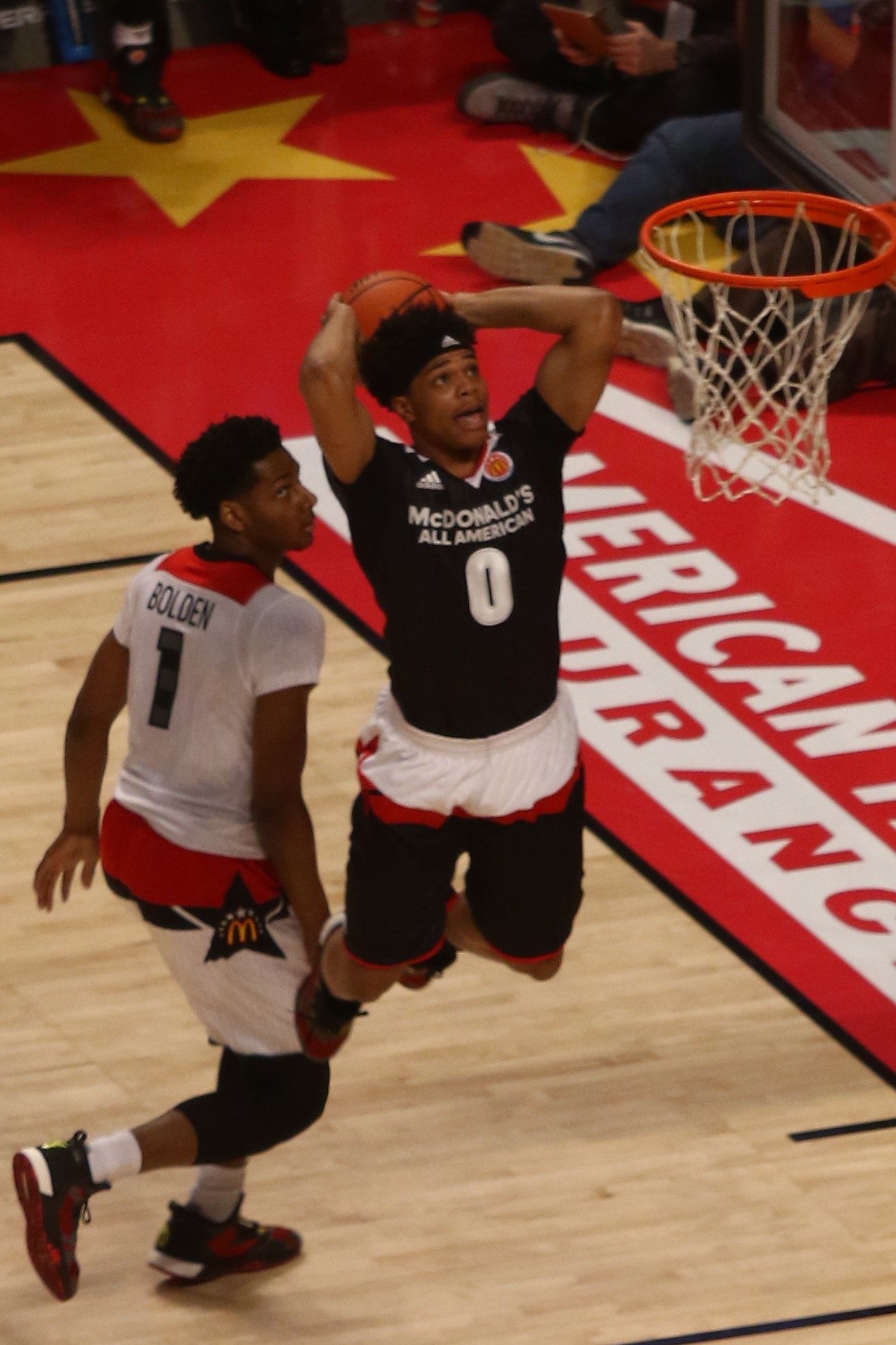
Miles Bridges, Michigan State

The 2016 recruiting class was called the best ever for Tom Izzo. Two five-star recruits, Miles Bridges (top 10 overall) and Joshua Langford (top 20 overall), and two four-star recruits, Cassius Winston (top 30 overall) and Nick Ward (top 50 overall) made up the incoming class. The class had been ranked in the top four nationally since all four signed their letters of intent.

College recruiting
Name	Hometown	School	Height	Weight	Commit date
Miles Bridges; No. 3 SF	Flint, MI	Huntington St. Joseph Prep	6 ft 7 in (2.01 m)	225 lb (102 kg)	Oct 13, 2015
Miles Bridges; No. 3 SF	Recruit ratings: Scout: Rivals: 247Sports: (96)				
Joshua Langford; No. 5 SG	Madison, AL	Madison Academy	6 ft 5 in (1.96 m)	200 lb (91 kg)	Nov 11, 2015
Joshua Langford; No. 5 SG	Recruit ratings: Scout: Rivals: 247Sports: (93)				
Nick Ward; No. 8 C	Gahanna, OH	Gahanna Lincoln High School	6 ft 9 in (2.06 m)	240 lb (110 kg)	Nov 11, 2015
Nick Ward; No. 8 C	Recruit ratings: Scout: Rivals: 247Sports: (87)				
Cassius Winston; No. 5 PG	Detroit, MI	University of Detroit Jesuit	6 ft 1 in (1.85 m)	177 lb (80 kg)	Nov 11, 2015
Cassius Winston; No. 5 PG	Recruit ratings: Scout: Rivals: 247Sports: (89)				
Overall recruit ranking: Scout: No. 5 Rivals: No. 4 247Sports: No. 4 ESPN: No. 4
Note: In many cases, Scout, Rivals, 247Sports, On3, and ESPN may conflict in their listings of height and weight.; In these cases, the average was taken. ESPN grades are on a 100-point scale.; Sources: "Michigan State Commit List for 2016". Rivals.; "Men's Basketball Recruiting". Scout.; "ESPN - Michigan State Spartans Basketball Recruiting 2016". ESPN.; "Scout.com Team Recruiting Rankings". Scout.; "2016 Team Ranking". Rivals.

== Preseason ==
On October 3, 2016, it was announced that Ben Carter suffered a knee injury and would miss a significant amount of time.

On October 12, 2016, the school announced the Breslin Center's new court design.

On October 14, 2016, Michigan State held its Midnight Madness celebration. Izzo wore his Hall of Fame jacket to begin the event, but changed into a coaching jacket and said he would be wearing this jacket for eight to 10 more years and that the Hall of Fame jacket will only be worn in "retirement or death".

On October 19, 2016, Michigan State announced the Gavin Schilling had suffered a non-contact knee injury prior the Midnight Madness event. The injury would require surgery and there was no timetable for Schilling's return.

MSU was ranked No. 9 in the preseason Coaches' Poll and No. 12 in the preseason AP Poll.

=== Preseason award watch lists ===
On October 18, 2016, Eron Harris was named to the watch list for the Jerry West Award, given annually to the top shooting guard in the nation. Two days later, Miles Bridges was named to the watch list for the Karl Malone Award, given to the top power forward in the nation. On November 10, Bridges was also named to the 50-member watch list for Naismith Award, given to the top player in the nation.

=== Exhibition games ===
In the first exhibition game on October 27, 2016, the Spartans defeated Division II Northwood, 93–69. Freshman Miles Bridges made a good first impression, totaling 33 points, eight rebounds and three assists. Freshman big man Nick Ward also performed well, scoring 19 points in 21 minutes of play. Cassius Winston, also a freshman, netted nine points and nine assists. Kenny Goins and Lourawls "Tum Tum" Nairn Jr. added eight points each. Freshamn Josh Langford did not play due to a hamstring issue. Izzo seemed disappointed with the team's first half defensive performance, calling on the lack of effort in defense and rebounding.

On November 2, 2016, the Spartans defeated Saginaw Valley State, ranked No. 4 in Division II, 87–77 in their final exhibition game. Miles Bridges again performed well, scoring 20 points with seven rebounds and four blocks. Cassius Winston added 18 points and six assists and Eron Harris had 14 points and nine rebounds. Matt McQuaid added 12 points and Nick Ward had six with three rebounds. Josh Langford did not play again due to his hamstring injury. Izzo was again disappointed with the teams inconsistency, praising their early defense, but disappointed as the Spartans allowed Saginaw Valley State to close the lead.

== Regular season ==
=== Non-conference regular season ===
The Spartans faced a difficult non-conference schedule that included travel of over 13,000 miles and playing eight games in 22 days. The Spartans also faced four ranked teams in the non-conference schedule and lost all four games. In their first eight games, they played only two home games.

==== November ====
The Spartans traveled to Hawaii to face No. 10 Arizona on November 11 to open the regular season. The Spartans wore wear special black camo uniforms for the game. The Spartans started well, jumping out to an early 17–2 lead over the Wildcats. Miles Bridges made some spectacular dunks, played 37 minutes and led the Spartans in scoring with 21, but MSU struggled offensively after its good start allowing Arizona to take the lead at the half. However, after the struggles, the Spartans were able to tie the game with seven seconds remaining on a "Tum Tum" Nairn three-pointer. Arizona however took the ball down the court and hit a layup with a little over a second left to win the game 65–63. Izzo was frustrated with his team's play, especially foul troubles and commented that he "played [Bridges] too much". Michigan State struggled with foul trouble as Cassisus Winston, Eron Harris, Joshua Langford, and Nairn each had three.

The Spartans traveled to New York to play No. 2 Kentucky in the Champions Classic on November 16. The Spartans started well, leading for portions of the early minutes of the game, but the talented Wildcats soon took over and routed the Spartans 69–48. Bridges struggled immensely in the game, looking like a freshman as he turned the ball over nine times and scored only six points. Senior guard Eron Harris was pulled early from the game after not giving enough effort and only played 13 minutes. Kenny Goins led the Spartans with nine points and Bridges added 12 rebounds, but the Spartans were no match for Kentucky. Bridges apologized to Izzo following the game saying it wouldn't happen again. Izzo stated that he was "a little embarrassed" at the team's offensive play. The Spartans moved to 0–2 on the season, the first time they had started the season 0–2 since 2011 when they lost their first two games to No. 1 North Carolina and No. 6 Duke.

MSU opened its home season on November 18 versus Mississippi Valley State. Looking to rebound from their early rough start, the Spartans struggled offensively early in the game. However, MSU took over quickly as Bridges dunked and shot the Spartans to a 48–23 lead at the half while scoring 21 points in the half. Bridges finished with 24 points, 11 rebounds, and six assists as MSU rolled over the Delta Devils, 100–53. Eron Harris added 19 points, Nick Ward had 18, and Matt McQuaid finished with 15 points. The Spartans moved to 1–2 on the season.

Two days later, the Spartans welcomed Florida Gulf Coast to the Breslin Center. This game was far from a laugher, however. Harris led the Spartans with 33 points, but missed two free throws in the waning seconds to give FGCU a chance to win. Florida Gulf Coast needed a basket with 1.6 seconds left to win it, but as the ball was in-bounded, the clock started early, before any player had touched it, resulting in the buzzer going off as Gulf Coast's Antravious Simmons attempted a last second shot. The play was reviewed, but the officials ruled that it could not be replayed, only that had Simmons' shot gone in, it would have counted despite the clock. Izzo lamented that his team looked soft as they were outrebounded 41–29. The 78–77 win put the Spartans at 2–2 on the season as they traveled to the Bahamas for the Battle 4 Atlantis tournament.

In the first game of the Battle 4 Atlantis tournament on November 23, the Spartans faced St. John's. Miles Bridges was again the star for the Spartans, scoring 22 points and adding 15 rebounds as the Spartans pulled away from the St. John's in the second half. Eron Harris added 14 points and "Tum Tum" Nairn tied his career high with 13 including a breakaway slam dunk and three three-pointers. The Spartans won 73–62 to advance to the tournament semifinals against Baylor. Izzo was still concerned with his team's play, stating that "It's still not smooth for us. It may not be for a while."

In the semifinals the next day, the Spartans faced No. 20-ranked Baylor. The Spartans started well and played a good first half, leading 33–30. Izzo changed his starting lineup for the first time, moving Matt McQuaid to the bench and starting Josh Langford. McQuaid answered by hitting two early three-pointers, but in the second half, the Spartans appeared to tire. Baylor pulled away easily as the Spartans could not answer their inside game. The Bears won easily, 73–58, forcing the Spartans to the third place game against Wichita State. After the game, Izzo apologized to his team for the schedule. He said that the schedule allowed for little practice time and hurt his players' development.

In the third place game on November 24, Izzo again started Langford in place of McQuaid and the Spartans, for the second straight game, started well. At the half, the Spartans led by 10. The lead blossomed to as many as 18 in the second half as Bridges scored 21 and Harris added 13. However, the Shockers fought back to within a basket, but the Spartans hit free throws down the line to pull out the 77–72 victory. The win moved the Spartans to 4–3 on the season.

Following the Battle 4 Atlantis tournament, the Spartans fell from the top-25 rankings in both polls and would remain unranked the remainder of the season.

On November 29, the Spartans traveled to Cameron Indoor Stadium to take on No. 5-ranked Duke as part of the Big Ten–ACC Challenge. The Spartans played well for the majority of the game holding the lead on several occasions and were tied at the half. However, Duke's talent was too much and the Spartans fell 78–69. Izzo was encouraged by his team's play, "I thought we played probably 33, (34) of good basketball against a good team, especially on the road." Michigan State's 18 turnovers were their undoing. Eron Harris had 14 points for MSU and Miles Bridges added 11 points and eight rebounds, but Izzo fell to 1–10 all time against Duke. Izzo added "But make no mistake about it, we got better tonight. We got a lot better tonight."

==== December ====
The Spartans returned to East Lansing to play five straight home games to end the non-conference slate.

On December 1, Tom Izzo announced that Miles Bridges would miss "as least a couple of weeks" due an injured ankle. Izzo also announced that Ben Carter would not play this season and that Gavin Schilling was still some time away from being ready to play, if at all, this year.

On December 3, in their first game without Bridges, the Spartans struggled mightily with one-win Oral Roberts. Kyle Ahrens received the start in Bridges' place, but MSU started slow. Freshman Nick Ward carried the Spartans, scoring a career-high 24 and adding 10 rebounds. But, the Spartans struggled defensively with ORU's size and were outrebounded and outscored in the paint. Izzo was again disappointed in his team, "Our energy level was not very good," Izzo said. "Don’t be fooled by scoring...We did not play very smart." The Spartans were able to pull out the victory 80–76 thanks in part to Cassius Winston's nine assists and 15 points. The win moved the Spartans to 5–4 on the season.

Youngstown State visited East Lansing on December 6 as the Spartans played their second game without Bridges. The other three freshmen led the way for the Spartans though as Joshua Langford scored a career-high 15 points, Nick Ward added 13 points, and Cassius Winston scored eight points and dished out nine assists. Izzo enjoyed the performance by the freshmen, especially Winston, saying, "He took a big step tonight." The Spartans played well defensively as well and pulled away from the Penguins to win 77–57 and move to 6–4 on the season.

On December 10, Tennessee Tech visited Breslin to face the Spartans who were without Bridges for the third straight game, but were also without Matt McQuaid due to a head injury suffered in practice. The Spartans started well, led by Eron Harris who scored 20 points including five three-pointers to lead the Spartans to as big as an 18-point lead. MSU played sloppy at points, but still pulled out the win, 71–63, to move to 7–4 on the season.

After eight days off for final exams, the Spartans welcomed Northeastern to East Lansing. MSU struggled from the start in their fourth game without Bridges. They trailed throughout the first half as Northeastern took advantage of their superior size. The Spartans regained the lead in the middle of the second half, led by Cassius Winston who finished with 21 points and 10 assists. However, Harris and many other Spartans struggled and Michigan State fell at home 71–63, falling to 7–5 with one non-conference game remaining. MSU struggled again from the free throw line and was shooting only 61% from the line on the season.

In the final non-conference foe of the season for the Spartans, Oakland, having lost to Northeastern the night before, visited the Breslin Center on December 21. Izzo again shook up the starting lineup as the Spartans were without Miles Bridges for a fifth straight game, starting three freshmen, Joshua Langford, Nick Ward, and Cassius Winston. Led by Ward's career-high 25 points, the Spartans were able to pull away from Oakland in the second half to win 77–65. Eron Harris added 15 points while Winston finished with nine points and eight assists. The win capped off a disappointing non-conference schedule with MSU at 8–5 on the season.

=== Big Ten regular season ===
==== December ====
On December 26, Tom Izzo announced that Miles Bridges was unlikely to play in the Big Ten opener versus Minnesota. He also announced that "Tum Tum" Nairn was also in a walking boot, but that he had not missed any practice time.

On December 27, the Spartans traveled to Minneapolis, Minnesota to open the Big Ten schedule against Minnesota. Without Bridges, Izzo started his three healthy freshman again. However, MSU shot the ball poorly in the first half and fell behind by as many as 15 points and trailed by 13 at the half. In the second half, the Spartans rallied behind Nick Ward's 22 points and 10 rebounds. Alvin Ellis III added a career-high 20 points as the Spartans and Gophers remained tied at the end of regulation. In overtime, "Tum Tum" Nairn hit his second three-pointer of the game to give him 13 points for the game, tying a career-high, but the Spartans still trailed by one with less than 20 seconds remaining. However, Ellis was fouled with 10.6 seconds remaining and made both free throws to give the Spartans a 75–74 lead. Minnesota's last second shot was wide and the Spartans completed the come-from-behind victory to move to 1–0 in conference and 9–5 on the season. Izzo was proud of his team after the game saying, "We found a way to win a game with some toughness. This team hasn’t done that all year.”

On December 30, the Spartans returned to Breslin Center to face Northwestern, winners of nine in a row. MSU started out hot, leading by as many as 19 early in the first half. The Spartans kept up the pressure in the second half, but Northwestern twice narrowed the lead to four points. But, led by Ellis' 16 points, the Spartans were able to hold off the Wildcats, to win 61–52. Cassius Winston added 15 points and six assists while Nick Ward added 11 points and nine rebounds. The win moved MSU to 10–5 on the season and 2–0 in conference.

==== January ====
On January 2, 2017, Tom Izzo announced that Miles Bridges would return to action on January 4 against Rutgers though he would not start.

Rutgers visited Breslin Center and started well, opening up an early 6–0 lead on the Spartans. But, the Spartans answered and Bridges, who did not start, scored on an alley-oop dunk 16 seconds after entering the game. Eron Harris led the way for the Spartans, scoring a Big-Ten-career-high of 24 points and the Spartans ran away with the game. Bridges again had a highlight-reel dunk on an alley-oop from Cassius Winston, who had eight assists, in the second half following his block of a Rutgers shot. Nick Ward added 15 points and Matt McQuaid added 12 for the Spartans in the 93–65 rout. The win was the fourth in a row for the Spartans as they moved to 11–5 on the season and 3–0 in conference. Bridges ended up with six points and six rebounds in 17 minutes after missing seven games.

On January 7, the Spartans started all four freshmen as they visited the Palestra in Philadelphia, Pennsylvania to take on Penn State. The Spartans started out slow again in the game which was technically a neutral site game as Penn State gave up a home game to play at the Palestra. Izzo said he was embarrassed by MSU's performance in the first half: "We guarded nobody, played with no energy and I was totally frustrated with the way we played. ... This was humiliating for me in this great city and great basketball venue and our players did not play and I did not have them ready to play. So the whole thing falls on me. I’m tired of explaining why I don’t see any light at the end of the tunnel. I see us getting better and the minute I say it we take that for granted." The Spartans, led by Nick Ward's 16 points, trailed by 12 at the half and were never able to even the score in the second half. As a result, the Spartans fell 72–63, falling to 11–6 overall and 3–1 in Big Ten play.

Following the loss to Penn State, the Spartans returned home to face the newly ranked No. 24 Minnesota on January 11. The Gophers had not lost since losing to the Spartans in overtime to open the Big Ten schedule. The Spartans wore "throwback" uniforms that featured the school's first name, Michigan Agricultural College. Cassius Winston was the lone freshman who did not start the game as "Tum Tum" Nairn joined Eron Harris in the starting lineup. Miles Bridges and Nick Ward led the Spartans in the first half as MSU jumped up early on Minnesota and used a 15–0 stretch to end the first half with a 22-point lead. Minnesota was only able to muster 17 first half points as the Spartan defense clamped down. Bridges scored all of his game-high 16 points in the first half as he looked to be fully into the game. Minnesota was only able to get the lead under 20 three times in the second half as the Spartans cruised to a 65–47 victory. Ward scored nine points with eight rebounds in 13 minutes before fouling out. Joshua Langford added 13 points as the Spartans remained in first place in the Big Ten with a 4–1 record, 12–6 overall. The win marked Tom Izzo's 250th win in Big Ten play.

Looking to stay in first place in Big Ten play, MSU headed to Columbus, Ohio to take on Ohio State who was 0–4 in Big Ten play. The Spartans started well, jumping to an early 12–5 lead over the Buckeyes. However, OSU responded with several runs in the first half to take a 36–33 lead at the half. In the second half, the teams traded leads, but MSU could not stop Ohio State and fell 72–67. Bridges led the Spartans with 24 points and nine rebounds, but turned the ball over six times. No other Spartan scored in double figures. Cassius Winston, one point and two assists in 11 minutes of play, and Nick Ward, nine points, four rebounds, and four fouls in 18 minutes, both struggled for the Spartans. The Spartans fell out of first place at 4–2 and 12–7 overall.

After a week off, MSU returned to the road to face Indiana who had just learned they would be without star player OG Anunoby for the remainder of the season. Indiana started off extremely well, led by James Blackmon's 18 points in the first half. The Spartans struggled defensively as IU took the halftime lead, 44–30. Indiana kept the hot shooting going early in the second half pushing the lead to as many as 20. However, MSU, behind Eron Harris' 21 points and a play-making Cassius Winston, fought back to within four points with five minutes remaining with a 24–10 stretch over 10 minutes. The comeback was not enough as the Hoosiers were able to hold on for the 82–75 victory. The loss left MSU at 12–8 overall and 4–3 in the Big Ten.

As the Spartans returned home looking to avoid their third straight loss, No. 20 Purdue paid a visit to East Lansing. MSU played well, taking an eight-point lead near the end of the first half, but gave up the lead. However, Miles Bridges hit a layup as time expired to tie the game at 39 at halftime. MSU's small front line struggled mightily against a much bigger Purdue team and MSU had three players with two fouls at halftime. In the second half, Purdue's size proved be too much for the Spartans pulling away late in the game to win 84–73. Bridges set the MSU single-game record for scoring by a freshman with 33 points, but no other Spartan scored in double figures. Caleb Swanigan led the Boilermakers, scoring 25 and adding 17 rebounds. The Spartans were outrebounded in the game 36–23. The loss gave the Spartans their third straight leaving their record at 12–9 and 4–4 in conference.

Looking to break out of a three-game losing streak, the Spartans welcomed rival Michigan to the Breslin Center. The teams exchanged runs and leads in the first half and MSU went to the break with a 32–28 lead. MSU played suffocating defense in the first and good defense in the second, holding Michigan to 26.9% from the three-point line in the game and 33.9% overall. Bridges again played well, though he didn't shoot well, as he totaled 15 points and 13 rebounds. Winston led the Spartans with 16 points including 10–11 from the free throw line. But, Matt McQuaid, who'd struggled most of the year, hit three big three-pointers and MSU made 73% of its free throws to pull out the tough 70–62 win. Ward added 13 points for the Spartans as they ended their three-game losing streak and moved to 13–9 overall and 5–4 in the Big Ten. The win marked MSU's fifth straight win over Michigan.

==== February ====
MSU next traveled to Lincoln, Nebraska on February 2 to attempt to end their road losing streak by facing Nebraska. Nebraska, winners of three straight against the Spartans, was coming off a come-from-behind win over Purdue who had defeated MSU the previous week. The Spartans' Kenny Goins started in place of Nick Ward even though both were suffering from the flu. Both Goins and Ward performed well, each scoring 10 points. Bridges, as usual, led the Spartans with 16 points as MSU's hot shooting behind the arc helped them pull away and lead by as many as 20 in the second half. Cassius Winston and Alvin Ellis combined to make five of six three-pointers (scoring 10 apiece), and Josh Langford hit his three shots from behind the arc to total 9 points as the Spartans made 11 of 18 three-pointers, shooting 64.7% from three. MSU's defense also did the job again, limiting Nebraska to 38.5% from the field as the Spartans won 72–61. The win was the first on the road for the Spartans since December 27. Izzo commented on the win, "We're getting better but we’ve got a long way to go.” MSU moved to 14–9 overall and 6–4 in Big Ten play.

On February 7, the Spartans traveled for a rematch against Michigan in Ann Arbor. In what was perhaps a must-win for Michigan, the Wolverines left no doubt, blowing out the Spartans 86–57. MSU turned the ball over 21 times, 12 times in the first half, as Michigan used a 14–2 run to end the first half and take a 55–29 lead at the half. Things got no better for the Spartans in the second half as Michigan pushed the lead to as high as 30. Cassius Winston turned the ball over six times while Miles Bridges turned it over five times. Nick Ward was whistled for a technical for tripping a Michigan player during a dead ball as the Spartans fell apart. Bridges led the Spartans with 15 points and Ward added 13, but MSU's defense struggled allowing Michigan to shoot 75 percent from the field in the first half. The 29-point loss tied for the worst loss MSU has suffered to Michigan under Tom Izzo and moved the Spartans to 14–10 overall and 6–5 in the Big Ten.

Looking to rebound from their embarrassing loss against Michigan, the Spartans welcomed Iowa, who had swept the Spartans the previous year, to the Breslin Center. MSU continued to struggle with turnovers, committing 12 turnovers in the first half. Miles Bridges led the Spartans, scoring 14 of his game-high 16 points in the first half, and kept MSU close as they trailed 32–31 at the half. In the second half, MSU's hot shooting and suffocating defense allowed the Spartans to pull away, leading by as many as 16. For the first time this season, all four MSU freshmen, Bridges, Joshua Langford, Nick Ward, and Cassius Winson, each scored in double figures. Bridges added 11 rebounds for his fifth double-double of the season. The Spartan defense held the Big Ten's leading scorer, Peter Jok, to 2-for-11 shooting and limited him to 13 points. The 77–66 win put MSU at 15–10 and 7–5 in sole possession of fifth place in the Big Ten.

On Valentine's Day, MSU welcomed Ohio State, who had beaten the Spartans a month earlier, to the Breslin Center. Senior Alvin Ellis III led the Spartans, scoring 15 straight points on five straight three-pointers in the first half, giving MSU the halftime lead 40–34. Ellis would add a sixth three-pointer in the second half to lead MSU for the game with 18 points. MSU stretched the lead to 12 early in the second half, before the Buckeyes fought back. Every time MSU attempted to take control of the game, OSU fought back. However, led by freshmen Miles Bridges' 14 points in the second half and a ferocious dunk by Joshua Langford, the Spartans were able to answer and hold on to their lead. Cassius Winston dished out nine assists and added eight points while Nick Ward added 15 points. The Spartans pulled out the must-win game, 74–65. The win, their fourth in five games, moved MSU closer to a near-certainty for the NCAA Tournament at 16–10, 8–5 in conference.

MSU next took to the road to face Purdue again on February 18. As in the first game, MSU had no answer for Purdue's big men, Caleb Swanigan and Isaac Haas. The Spartans also struggled offensively and with fouls. Kenny Goins and Nick Ward, MSU's big men, fouled out early in the second half as Purdue rolled. To add insult to injury, Eron Harris was carted off the floor after what ended up being a season-ending knee injury with eight minutes remaining in the game. Miles Bridges led the Spartans again with 14 points, but 11 of those came in the second half when the game was already decided. Swanigan had 24 points and 15 rebounds for the Boilermakers and Haas added 18 points. The 80–63 loss dropped MSU to 8–6 in conference and 16–11 overall.

In their first game without Eron Harris, Nebraska visited the Breslin Center while Alvin Ellis started in Harris' spot. Both teams started slow and MSU led 28–26 before the Spartans went on a 21–5 run to end the half. The run included a Cassius Winston assist off the glass to Miles Bridges after a steal by Winston and a half-court shot by Winston as the half expired, putting MSU up 49–31. The rout continued in the second half as Michigan State pushed the lead to as much as 24 while Nebraska could not get within 14. Bridges and Nick Ward each had 20 points marking the first time since January 5, 1978, when Magic Johnson and Jay Vincent did it, that MSU had two freshmen score 20 points in a game. Josh Langford added 17 points, a career high, while Winston had nine assists and seven points. Together the Spartan freshmen combined for 64 points and 20 rebounds in the game. The 88–72 win put MSU at 9–6 in conference and in a fourth place tie with Northwestern and Minnesota, both of whom MSU owned the tiebreaker over. With three games remaining in the season, MSU's record stood at 17–11.

On Senior Day, the Spartans were looking to remove themselves from the NCAA Tournament bubble and continue their streak of NCAA Tournament appearances. MSU had a chance for a signature win as they welcomed No. 16 Wisconsin to East Lansing. An early lead gave MSU a jump as they led by as many as 13 in the first half. However, foul trouble to Nick Ward and Miles Bridges led to a big run by Wisconsin in the final few minutes of the half and put the Badgers within one at the half. MSU, however, countered in the second half and controlled the half led by Ward's 20 points and nine rebounds. Matt McQuaid contributed for the Spartans as well, scoring 15 points mostly on drives to the basket. Miles Bridges added 15 and Cassius Winston added 10 points and nine assists as the Spartans pulled away. In the waning seconds of the game with MSU comfortably ahead, Tom Izzo sent the injured Eron Harris on the court so that he could get his opportunity as a senior to kiss the Spartan logo on the court. Izzo had McQuaid travel with the ball with less than five seconds remaining so the crowd could cheer Harris on as he kissed the Spartan logo. The big win by MSU, 84–74, likely secured MSU's NCAA Tournament appearance with two regular season games remaining. The win put MSU at 18–11 and 10–6 and put them in a three-way tie for third place in the Big Ten with Minnesota and Maryland, over whom MSU held the tiebreakers.

==== March ====
Looking to improve their NCAA Tournament position and remain off the bubble, the Spartans traveled to Champaign on March 1 to visit an Illinois team who was looking to get into the bubble discussion. MSU started well, but Illinois answered and took the half time lead. MSU kept it close in the second half, but trailed for most of it. Miles Bridges led the Spartans with 21 points and Alvin Ellis added 15 (13 of which came in the second half). MSU struggled inside as their lack of depth allowed Maverick Morgan to score 14 points, most over Kenny Goins. Illinois also hit 11 three-pointers as the Spartans turned the ball over 15 times. Still, MSU had a chance to tie it on two separate occasions, but a Bridges shot with less than 10 seconds remaining and Nairn's last second heave missed the mark and Spartans fell 73–70. The loss knocked the Spartans back into a fifth place tie at 10–7 in conference and left the NCAA Tournament streak still in question at 18–12.

With a chance to secure the No. 3 seed in the Big Ten tournament on March 3, Michigan State traveled to Maryland to end the regular season with a chance at a double bye in the Big Ten tournament. MSU played well in the first half, but foul trouble, three for Kenny Goins and two for Nick Ward, left their lead at only one at halftime. In the second half, Maryland led most of the way, but MSU turned to Nick Ward to keep it close. Ward's 22 points and career-high 16 rebounds left the Spartans tied with less than a 30 seconds remaining in the game. However, MSU went scoreless for the final 3:11 of the game and Ward could not handle Cassius Winston's pass for a layup to take the lead. Maryland's Melo Trimble hit a three-pointer with 1.1 seconds remaining to give Maryland the win and the No. 3 seed in the Big Ten tournament. Miles Bridges' 18 points and eight rebounds were not enough as MSU would have to wait to see where they would end up as a seed in the Big Ten tournament. The loss put MSU at 18–13 on the season and 10–8 in conference.

Following action on the final day of the regular season, the Spartans received the No. 5 seed in the Big Ten tournament finishing in a tie for fifth place in Big Ten play.

=== Big Ten tournament ===
As the No. 5 seed in the Big Ten tournament, MSU was set to face Penn State in the second round on March 9, 2017. Looking to keep its streak of appearing in every Big Ten tournament quarterfinals round ever, MSU traveled to Washington, D.C. to take on the Nittany Lions. MSU jumped up quickly on Penn State with a 12–0 run in the first half and dominated the game. They held Penn State to 29 percent from the field and outrebounded them 44–29. Miles Bridges and Nick Ward each had 15 points and nine rebounds as they won easily 78–51. With the win, MSU moved to the quarterfinals of the Big Ten tournament to face Minnesota.

Having beaten Minnesota twice in the regular season, the Spartans looked to do it a third time, but Minnesota fought hard in the game. Led by Reggie Lynch's 16 points, the Golden Gophers were able to hold off the Spartans 63–58. MSU's freshmen struggled, according to Tom Izzo, and Cassius Winston played less than four minutes in the second half. Nick Ward, who scored 15 points and added 11 rebounds, only played 20 minutes. Miles Bridges scored 20 for the Spartans, but was only 2–11 from beyond the arc. With the loss, the Spartans had to wait to see their fate for the NCAA tournament.

=== NCAA Tournament ===
The Spartans received a No. 9 seed in the Midwest region of the NCAA Tournament. The bid marked the Spartans 20th consecutive trip to the tournament, the fourth-longest streak ever, and third-longest active streak. In the First Round against No. 8-seeded Miami, the Spartans fell behind early, trailing 10–0 and 17–5. However, MSU came alive, closing the first half on a 30–8 run to take a 12-point lead into halftime. MSU kept the play up in the second half moving the lead to as many as 23 over the Hurricanes. The freshmen led the way for the Spartans as Miles Bridges, Nick Ward, Joshua Langford, and Cassius Winston combined for 57 points, 19 rebounds, nine assists, and two turnovers. Ward had 19 points, Bridges 18, and Langford contributed 13 as the Spartans blew out the Hurricanes 78–58 to advance to the Second Round. Izzo called the last 30 minutes of play the best the Spartans had played all year.

In the Second Round, No. 1-seeded Kansas awaited the Spartans. MSU played hard and exchanged the lead with Jayhawks for most of the first half. In the second half, MSU still held strong, trailing by five points with seven minutes remaining. However, Kansas' experience took over as a close game turned into a 20-point win for the Jayhawks. Miles Bridges, in perhaps his final game as a Spartan, left the game early in the first half with a hip injury, but returned and scored 22 points to lead the Spartans. Nick Ward added 13 points, but suffered foul trouble that limited his effectiveness. The loss ended MSU's season with a 20–15 record.

== Roster ==
The remaining scholarship was given to senior and former walk-on Matt Van Dyk.

2016–17 Michigan State Spartans men's basketball team
Players
Coaches

Pos.	#	Name	Height	Weight	Year	Previous school	Hometown
G	0	Kyle Ahrens	6 ft 5 in (1.96 m)	215 lb (98 kg)	So	Versailles H.S.	Versailles, OH
F	22	Miles Bridges	6 ft 7 in (2.01 m)	230 lb (104 kg)	Fr	Huntington Prep	Flint, MI
F	13	Ben Carter (injured) (redshirt)	6 ft 9 in (2.06 m)	225 lb (102 kg)	GS	Bishop Gorman/Oregon/UNLV	Las Vegas, NV
G	3	Alvin Ellis III	6 ft 4 in (1.93 m)	210 lb (95 kg)	Sr	De La Salle	Chicago, IL
G	41	Connor George (W)	6 ft 3 in (1.91 m)	200 lb (91 kg)	RS Fr	Okemos H.S.	Okemos, MI
F	25	Kenny Goins	6 ft 6 in (1.98 m)	230 lb (104 kg)	RS So	Warren Mott H.S.	Troy, MI
G	14	Eron Harris (injured)	6 ft 3 in (1.91 m)	190 lb (86 kg)	RS Sr	Lawrence North H.S./West Virginia	Indianapolis, IN
G	1	Joshua Langford	6 ft 5 in (1.96 m)	210 lb (95 kg)	Fr	Madison Academy	Madison, AL
F	20	Matt McQuaid	6 ft 5 in (1.96 m)	200 lb (91 kg)	So	Duncanville H.S.	Duncanville, TX
G	11	Lourawls Nairn, Jr. (C)	5 ft 10 in (1.78 m)	175 lb (79 kg)	Jr	Sunrise Christian Academy	Nassau, Bahamas
G	40	Greg Roy (W)	6 ft 3 in (1.91 m)	210 lb (95 kg)	Jr	North Crowley/Adrian College	Fort Worth, TX
F	34	Gavin Schilling (injured) (redshirt)	6 ft 9 in (2.06 m)	240 lb (109 kg)	Sr	Findlay Prep	Chicago, IL
F	30	Matt Van Dyk	6 ft 5 in (1.96 m)	220 lb (100 kg)	RS Sr	Imlay City	Imlay City, MI
C	44	Nick Ward	6 ft 8 in (2.03 m)	250 lb (113 kg)	Fr	Gahanna Lincoln	Gahanna, OH
G	5	Cassius Winston	6 ft 1 in (1.85 m)	185 lb (84 kg)	Fr	University of Detroit Jesuit	Detroit, MI

Head coach

- Tom Izzo (Northern Michigan)

Assistant coach(es)

- Dwayne Stephens (Michigan State)
- Dane Fife (Indiana)
- Mike Garland (Northern Michigan)

Legend

- (C) Team captain
- (S) Suspended
- (I) Ineligible
- (W) Walk-on
- Injured
- Current redshirt

Roster

=== Depth chart ===
Pos.	Starting 5	Bench 1	Bench 2	Bench 3
C	Nick Ward
PF	Miles Bridges	Kenny Goins	Kyle Ahrens	Matt Van Dyk
SF	Joshua Langford
SG	Alvin Ellis III	Matt McQuaid
PG	Lourawls Nairn Jr.	Cassius Winston

== Schedule and results ==
Date time, TV	Rank^{#}	Opponent^{#}	Result	Record	High points	High rebounds	High assists	Site (attendance) city, state
Exhibition
Oct 27, 2016*; 7:00 pm, BTN+		Northwood	W 93–69		33 – Bridges	5 – Bridges	9 – Winston	Breslin Center (14,797); East Lansing, MI
Nov 2, 2016*; 7:00 pm, BTN+	No. 12	Saginaw Valley State	W 87–77		20 – Bridges	9 – Harris	6 – Winston	Breslin Center (14,797); East Lansing, MI
Non-conference regular season
Nov 11, 2016*; 7:00 pm, ESPN	No. 12	vs. No. 10 Arizona; Armed Forces Classic	L 63–65	0–1	21 – Bridges	8 – Goins	4 – Nairn, Jr.	Stan Sheriff Center (9,475); Honolulu, HI
Nov 15, 2016*; 7:00 pm, ESPN	No. 13	vs. No. 2 Kentucky; Champions Classic	L 48–69	0–2	9 – Goins/Winston	12 – Bridges	2 – McQuaid/Winston	Madison Square Garden (19,812); New York, NY
Nov 18, 2016*; 7:00 pm, BTN+	No. 13	Mississippi Valley State	W 100–53	1–2	24 – Bridges	11 – Bridges	11 – Winston	Breslin Center (14,797); East Lansing, MI
Nov 20, 2016*; 7:00 pm, BTN	No. 13	Florida Gulf Coast; Battle 4 Atlantis opening round	W 78–77	2–2	31 – Harris	7 – Bridges	7 – Nairn, Jr.	Breslin Center (14,797); East Lansing, MI
Nov 23, 2016*; 7:00 pm, AXS TV	No. 24	vs. St. John's; Battle 4 Atlantis quarterfinals	W 73–62	3–2	22 – Bridges	15 – Bridges	4 – Nairn, Jr.	Imperial Arena (2,344); Nassau, Bahamas
Nov 24, 2016*; 12:00 pm, ESPN	No. 24	vs. No. 20 Baylor; Battle 4 Atlantis semifinals	L 58–73	3–3	15 – Bridges	6 – Nairn Jr	4 – Harris	Imperial Arena (1,597); Nassau, Bahamas
Nov 25, 2016*; 1:00 pm, ESPN	No. 24	vs. Wichita State; Battle 4 Atlantis third place game	W 77–72	4–3	21 – Bridges	6 – Ward	12 – Nairn Jr	Imperial Arena (1,569); Nassau, Bahamas
Nov 29, 2016*; 9:30 pm, ESPN		at No. 5 Duke; ACC–Big Ten Challenge	L 69–78	4–4	14 – Harris	9 – Bridges	7 – Winston	Cameron Indoor Stadium (9,314); Durham, NC
Dec 3, 2016*; 4:30 pm, BTN		Oral Roberts	W 80–76	5–4	24 – Ward	10 – Ward	9 – Winston	Breslin Center (14,797); East Lansing, MI
Dec 6, 2016*; 7:00 pm, ESPNU		Youngstown State	W 77–57	6–4	15 – Langford	9 – Van Dyk	9 – Winston	Breslin Center (14,797); East Lansing, MI
Dec 10, 2016*; 2:00 pm, BTN		Tennessee Tech	W 71–63	7–4	20 – Harris	7 – Ahrens	9 – Winston	Breslin Center (14,797); East Lansing, MI
Dec 18, 2016*; 7:00 pm, BTN		Northeastern	L 63–71	7–5	21 – Winston	7 – Ward	10 – Winston	Breslin Center (14,797); East Lansing, MI
Dec 21, 2016*; 7:00 pm, BTN		Oakland	W 77–65	8–5	25 – Ward	9 – Ward	8 – Winston	Breslin Center (14,797); East Lansing, MI
Big Ten regular season
Dec 27, 2016; 9:00 pm, ESPN2		at Minnesota	W 75–74 ^{OT}	9–5 (1–0)	22 – Ward	10 – Ward	6 – Winston	Williams Arena (11,407); Minneapolis, MN
Dec 30, 2016; 6:00 pm, BTN		Northwestern	W 61–52	10–5 (2–0)	16 – Ellis	9 – Ward	6 – Winston	Breslin Center (14,797); East Lansing, MI
Jan 4, 2017; 6:30 pm, BTN		Rutgers	W 93–65	11–5 (3–0)	24 – Harris	6 – Bridges/Goins/Ward	8 – Winston	Breslin Center (14,797); East Lansing, MI
Jan 7, 2017; 1:00 pm, ESPN		vs. Penn State; Palestra Big Ten Showcase	L 63–72	11–6 (3–1)	16 – Ward	6 – Bridges	3 – Winston	The Palestra (8,722); Philadelphia, PA
Jan 11, 2017; 7:00 pm, BTN		No. 24 Minnesota	W 65–47	12–6 (4–1)	16 – Bridges	9 – Goins	4 – Harris	Breslin Center (14,797); East Lansing, MI
Jan 15, 2017; 12:30 pm, CBS		at Ohio State	L 67–72	12–7 (4–2)	24 – Bridges	9 – Bridges	8 – Nairn Jr.	Value City Arena (17,449); Columbus, OH
Jan 21, 2017; 4:00 pm, ESPN		at Indiana	L 75–82	12–8 (4–3)	21 – Harris	10 – Bridges	4 – Bridges	Simon Skjodt Assembly Hall (17,222); Bloomington, IN
Jan 24, 2017; 7:00 pm, ESPN2		No. 20 Purdue	L 73–84	12–9 (4–4)	33 – Bridges	7 – Bridges	6 – Nairn Jr.	Breslin Center (14,797); East Lansing, MI
Jan 29, 2017; 1:00 pm, CBS		Michigan; Rivalry	W 70–62	13–9 (5–4)	16 – Winston	13 – Bridges	4 – Nairn	Breslin Center (14,797); East Lansing, MI
Feb 2, 2017; 7:00 pm, ESPN		at Nebraska	W 72–61	14–9 (6–4)	16 – Bridges	6 – Bridges	4 – Harris	Pinnacle Bank Arena (15,821); Lincoln, NE
Feb 7, 2017; 9:00 pm, ESPN		at Michigan; Rivalry	L 57–86	14–10 (6–5)	15 – Bridges	7 – Ward	4 – Winston	Crisler Center (11,864); Ann Arbor, MI
Feb 11, 2017; 6:00 pm, BTN		Iowa	W 77–66	15–10 (7–5)	16 – Bridges	11 – Bridges	5 – Winston	Breslin Center (14,797); East Lansing, MI
Feb 14, 2017; 9:00 pm, ESPN		Ohio State	W 74–66	16–10 (8–5)	18 – Ellis	11 – Bridges	9 – Winston	Breslin Center (14,797); East Lansing, MI
Feb 18, 2017; 4:00 pm, ESPN		at No. 16 Purdue	L 63–80	16–11 (8–6)	14 – Bridges	9 – Bridges	5 – Nairn Jr.	Mackey Arena (14,804); West Lafayette, IN
Feb 23, 2017; 7:00 pm, ESPNU		Nebraska	W 88–72	17–11 (9–6)	20 – Bridges/Ward	9 – Ward	9 – Winston	Breslin Center (14,797); East Lansing, MI
Feb 26, 2017; 4:00 pm, CBS		No. 16 Wisconsin	W 84–74	18–11 (10–6)	22 – Ward	9 – Ward	8 – Winston	Breslin Center (14,797); East Lansing, MI
March 1, 2017; 9:00 pm, BTN		at Illinois	L 70–73	18–12 (10–7)	21 – Bridges	10 – Bridges	3 – Nairn	State Farm Center (15,544); Champaign, IL
March 4, 2017; 2:00 pm, BTN		at Maryland	L 60–63	18–13 (10–8)	22 – Ward	16 – Ward	5 – Winston	Xfinity Center (17,950); College Park, MD
Big Ten tournament
Mar 9, 2017; 2:30 pm, BTN	(5)	vs. (13) Penn State; Second Round	W 78–51	19–13	15 – Bridges/Ward	9 – Bridges/Ward	9 – Nairn Jr.	Verizon Center; Washington, DC
Mar 10, 2017; 2:25 pm, ESPN	(5)	vs. (4) Minnesota; Quarterfinals	L 58–63	19–14	20 – Bridges	15 – Ward	3 – Goins	Verizon Center (12,334); Washington, DC
NCAA tournament
March 17, 2017; 9:20 pm, TNT	(9 MW)	vs. (8 MW) Miami; First Round	W 78–58	20–14	19 – Ward	9 – Bridges	5 – Nairn Jr./Winston	BOK Center (14,715); Tulsa, Oklahoma
March 19, 2017; 5:15 pm, CBS	(9 MW)	vs. (1 MW) No. 3 Kansas; Second Round	L 70–90	20–15	22 – Bridges	8 – Bridges	8 – Winston	BOK Center (15,299); Tulsa, Oklahoma
*Non-conference game. ^{#}Rankings from AP Poll. (#) Tournament seedings in parentheses. MW=Midwest Region Source. All times are in Eastern Time.

== Player statistics ==
Individual player statistics (FINAL)
			Minutes		Scoring		Total FGs			3-point FGs			Free-Throws			Rebounds							
Player	GP	GS	Tot	Avg	Pts	Avg	FG	FGA	Pct	3FG	3FA	Pct	FT	FTA	Pct	Off	Def	Tot	Avg	A	Stl	Blk	TO
Ahrens, Kyle	34	4	278	8.2	87	2.6	30	70	.429	15	45	.333	12	12	16	.750	6	33	1.1	8	1	0	9
Bridges, Miles	28	27	895	32.0	473	16.9	177	364	486	56	144	.389	63	92	.685	41	191	232	8.3	58	19	43	66
Ellis, III, Alvin	35	8	678	19.4	225	6.4	72	72	.400	41	113	.363	40	57	.702	22	86	108	3.1	43	22	13	49
George, Conner	10	0	12	1.2	6	0.6	1	2	.500	0	1	.000	4	6	.667	0	3	3	0.3	1	0	0	3
Goins, Kenny	35	14	639	18.3	118	3.4	48	83	.578	0	0		22	33	.667	38	121	159	4.5	21	8	21	37
Harris, Eron	27	24	618	22.9	290	10.7	101	234	.432	43	111	.387	45	59	.763	14	67	81	3.0	46	11	5	47
Langford, Joshua	35	27	735	21.0	242	6.9	94	189	.497	37	89	.416	17	26	.654	25	56	81	2.3	38	14	3	38
McQuaid, Matt	34	10	714	21.0	189	5.6	61	115	.353	42	120	.350	25	35	.714	19	45	64	1.9	41	14	2	27
Nairn, Lourawls	35	30	799	22.8	122	3.5	48	115	.417	12	37	.324	14	27	.519	3	84	87	2.5	127	15	4	59
Roy, Greg	7	0	8	1.0	3	0.4	1	3	.333	0	1	.000	1	2	.500	1	0	1	0.1	0	0	0	0
Van Dyk, Matt	8	4	237	7.7	39	1.3	14	26	.538	0	0		11	23	.478	27	25	52	1.3	12	9	12	12
Ward, Nick	35	21	694	19.8	475	13.9	181	306	.592	0	0		123	200	.615	97	130	227	6.5	14	12	54	58
Winston, Cassius	35	5	72	20.7	236	6.7	77	182	.426	27	71	.380	55	70	.786	6	58	64	1.8	182	26	5	77
Team																27	44	71					
Total	35		7025		2515	71.9	905	1927	.470	273	732	.373	432	646	.669	326	949	1275	36.4	591	151	162	489
Opponents	35		7025		2404	68.7	832	2027	.410	229	662	.346	511	704	.726	801	801	1150	32.8	446	211	105	380

Legend
GP	Games played	GS	Games started	Avg	Average per game
FG	Field-goals made	FGA	Field-goal attempts	Off	Offensive rebounds
Def	Defensive rebounds	A	Assists	TO	Turnovers
Blk	Blocks	Stl	Steals

== Rankings ==
Ranking movements Legend: ██ Increase in ranking ██ Decrease in ranking — = Not ranked RV = Received votes
	Week																			
Poll	Pre	1	2	3	4	5	6	7	8	9	10	11	12	13	14	15	16	17	18	Final
AP	12	13	14	RV	RV	RV	—	—	—	—	—	—	—	—	—	—	RV	RV	—	Not released
Coaches	9	13	20	RV	RV	RV	RV	—	—	—	—	—	—	—	—	—	RV	—	—	RV

*AP does not release post-NCAA tournament rankings

== Awards and honors ==
=== In-season awards ===
Name	Award	Date	Source
Miles Bridges	Big Ten Freshman of the Week	November 14, 2016	
Miles Bridges	Big Ten Freshman of the Week	November 29, 2016	
Miles Bridges	Big Ten Freshman of the Week	January 16, 2017	
Miles Bridges	Big Ten Freshman of the Week	January 30, 2017	
Miles Bridges	Big Ten Freshman of the Week	February 20, 2017	
Miles Bridges	Karl Malone Power Forward of the Year (finalist)	February 2, 2017	
Nick Ward	Big Ten Freshman of the Week	December 5, 2016	
Nick Ward	Big Ten Freshman of the Week	January 2, 2017	
Nick Ward	Big Ten Freshman of the Week	February 27, 2017*	
Nick Ward	Big Ten Player of the Week	February 27, 2017*	

* Ward was the only Big Ten player to receive both awards in the same week and the first Spartan to receive both in the same week since Delvon Roe in 2009.

=== Post-season awards ===
==== Miles Bridges ====
- Big Ten Freshman of the Year
- All-Big Ten Second Team (media and coaches)
- All-Big Ten Freshmen Team (unanimous media and coaches' selection)
- Sporting News Freshmen All-American Team
- USBWA All-District V Team
- AP Big Ten Newcomer of the Year (unanimous)
- AP All-Big Ten Second Team
- NABC All-District 7 First Team

==== Nick Ward ====
- All-Big Ten Honorable Mention (media and coaches)
