= Joshua Langford =

American basketball player (born 1997)

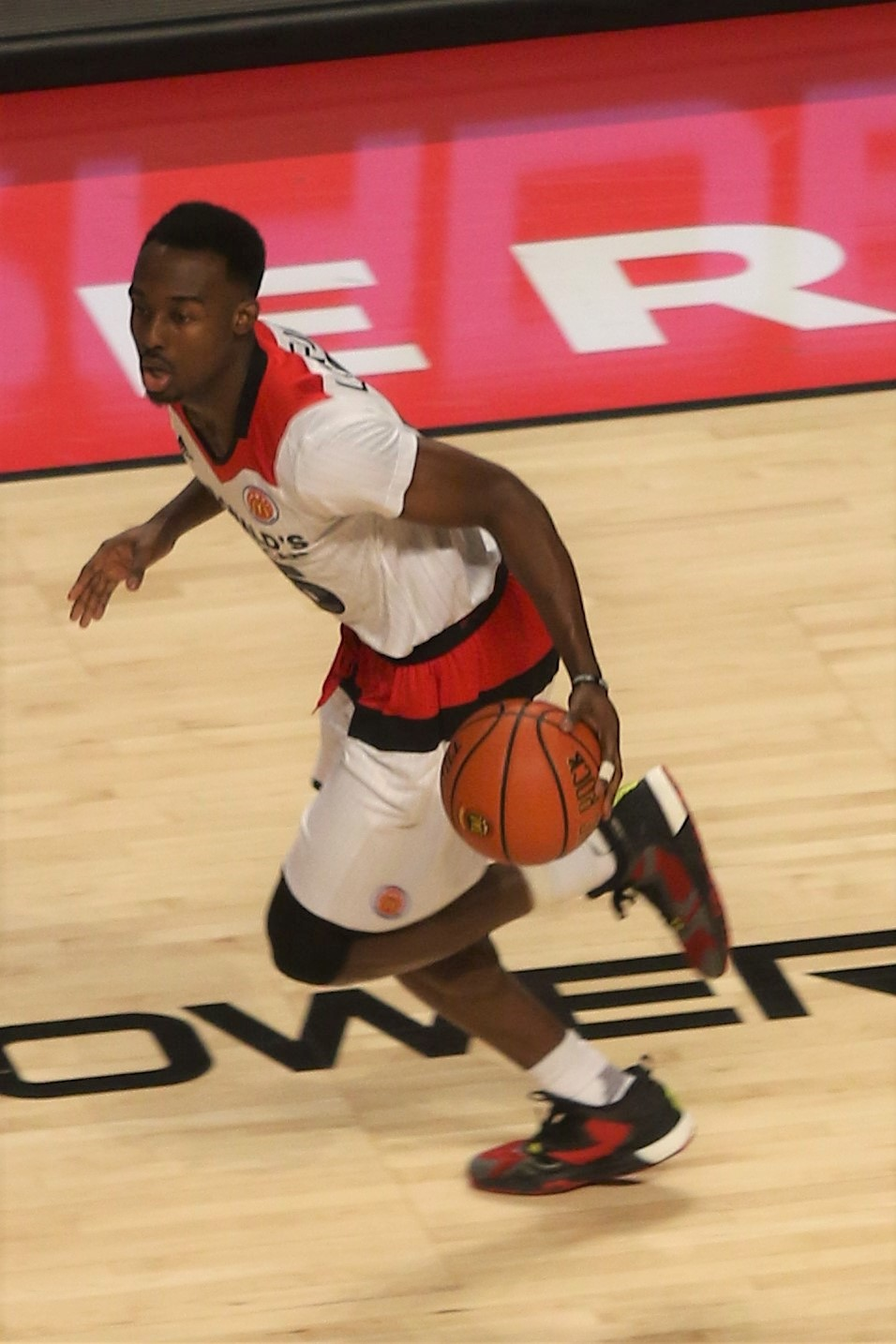
- Langford in the 2016 McDonalds All-American Game

Personal information
- Born: January 15, 1997 (age 29) Huntsville, Alabama, U.S.
- Listed height: 6 ft 5 in (1.96 m)
- Listed weight: 200 lb (91 kg)

Career information
- High school: Madison Academy (Madison, Alabama)
- College: Michigan State (2016–2021)
- Position: Shooting guard
- Coaching career: 2023–present

Career history

Coaching
- 2023–present: Madison Academy (assistant)

Career highlights
- McDonald's All-American (2016); Nike Hoop Summit (2016)

Joshua Langford (born January 15, 1997) is an American basketball coach and former player. He is an assistant coach for the boys team at Madison Academy. He played college basketball for the Michigan State Spartans. A native of Huntsville, Alabama, he competed for Madison Academy at the high school level.

== Early life and high school career ==
Langford is the son of Tellus Langford. When he was 12 years old attending a football camp, Josh fell ill and began experiencing headaches, a spiking fever, and hallucinations. He was diagnosed with bacterial meningitis and nearly died, spending a week in the hospital. But when he recovered, he grew three inches and returned to playing basketball. At Madison Academy, Langford was a four-time Class 3A Player of the Year, a two-time Gatorade Alabama Player of the Year and a two-time state champion. He also taught Sunday School, volunteered for the Special Olympics and wrote poetry in his free time.

== College career ==
Langford was a five-star recruit and was ranked as the 17th-best player of his class by Rivals.com. He declined offers from schools such as Michigan, Kentucky, Kansas, Arizona and Duke. He announced that he would play for Michigan State on June 22, 2015, citing the "family atmosphere" as the reason he chose the Spartans.

Langford had 17 points, a career high, in a win against Nebraska in February 2017. In the first round of the NCAA tournament Langford contributed 13 as the Spartans blew out the Miami Hurricanes 78–58 to advance to the second round. Langford scored in double figures eight times as a freshman. He favored the mid-range shot, which is on the decline in basketball. In one game versus Notre Dame in November 2017, he had 17 points by utilizing his mid-range game. In another November game, Langford had the big offensive game for the Spartans, scoring a career-high 23 points as the Spartans defeated North Carolina. Josh Langford scored 23 points to lead the Spartans to an easy win over Cleveland State on December 28. Langford added 22 points in the NCAA tournament win over Bucknell.

Langford was limited to 13 games as a junior due to a foot injury. On December 19, it was announced that Langford would miss the entire 2019–20 season after undergoing foot surgery. He still has an extra season of eligibility.

On November 25, 2020, Langford returned to the court for the Spartans for the first time since December 2018 in Michigan State's 2020 season opener against Eastern Michigan, scoring 10 points in the 83–67 victory. On April 4, 2021, Langford retired from playing basketball after a series of injuries.

== Career statistics ==
Legend
GP	Games played	GS	Games started	MPG	Minutes per game
FG%	Field goal percentage	3P%	3-point field goal percentage	FT%	Free throw percentage
RPG	Rebounds per game	APG	Assists per game	SPG	Steals per game
BPG	Blocks per game	PPG	Points per game	**Bold**	Career high

=== College ===
Year	Team	GP	GS	MPG	FG%	3P%	FT%	RPG	APG	SPG	BPG	PPG
2016–17	Michigan State	**35**	27	21.0	**.497**	**.416**	.654	2.3	1.1	.4	.1	6.9
2017–18	Michigan State	**35**	**35**	27.0	.429	.404	**.849**	3.0	1.5	.4	.1	11.7
2018–19	Michigan State	13	13	28.0	.443	.403	.839	**3.6**	1.8	**.8**	.1	**15.0**
2020–21	Michigan State	27	26	**28.6**	.377	.343	.745	**3.6**	**2.3**	.6	**.3**	9.7
Career		110	101	25.5	.431	.390	.789	3.0	1.5	.5	.1	10.1

== Post-playing career ==
Langford worked at Michigan State University's Broad College of Business as a program coordinator after his playing retirement. On May 17, 2023, it was announced that Langford would be returning to his alma mater, Madison Academy, as an assistant coach for the boys team.
