= Ben Carter (basketball) =

American-Israeli basketball player

Ben Carter בן קרטר
No. 13 – Maccabi Tel Aviv
- Position: Power forward
- League: Israel Basketball Premier League; EuroLeague

Personal information
- Born: August 22, 1994 (age 32) Tel Aviv, Israel
- Listed height: 6 ft 9 in (2.06 m)
- Listed weight: 224 lb (102 kg)

Career information
- High school: Bishop Gorman (Las Vegas, Nevada)
- College: Oregon (2012–2014); UNLV (2015–2016); Michigan State (2017–2018)
- NBA draft: 2018: undrafted
- Playing career: 2018–present

Career history
- 2018: Hapoel Jerusalem B.C.
- 2018–2020: Hapoel Afula
- 2020–2023: Hapoel Eilat B.C.
- 2023–present: Maccabi Tel Aviv
Medals
Men's basketball
Representing United States
Maccabiah Games
Gold medal – first place	2013 Jerusalem	National team

Ben Joshua Carter (Hebrew: בן קרטר; born August 22, 1994) is an American-Israeli basketball player who plays for Maccabi Tel Aviv of the Israel Basketball Premier League and the EuroLeague. He plays the power forward position.

== Early and personal life ==
Carter was born in Tel Aviv, Israel, and is Jewish. He said that the fact that he is Israeli "means a lot. I take pride in my Israeli citizenship, my Israeli heritage, even though I haven’t lived there my whole life. I was born there. I still have roots there. I still take pride in my culture. Just to be able to represent my country whenever I can, every time I step out on the court, it’s really an honor."

Carter's parents are Mike and Israeli-born Hadar, a former lieutenant in the Israeli Army. His father, Mike Carter, played one of his 17 professional seasons for Hapoel Jerusalem (1988–89), and played 13 seasons in Israel in total. Carter also played 13 seasons in Tel Aviv, before the family relocated to Las Vegas, Nevada. His father coached him growing up and playing for the Las Vegas Lakers on the AAU circuit.

Carter is 6 ft 9 in (2.06 metres) tall. He weighs 224 pounds (102 kg). He attended Bishop Gorman High School ('12) in Las Vegas. Carter averaged 12.5 points and 8.5 rebounds per game as a junior, and was all-state and all-conference. He averaged 10.1 points and 7.4 rebounds per game as a senior, and was third-team all-state and all-conference.

== Maccabiah Games ==
In 2013 Carter and his brother Tim played basketball for Team USA at the 2013 Maccabiah Games, winning a gold medal. He was the youngest member on the team, and his father was assistant coach to head coach Brad Greenberg.

== College basketball ==
Carter played his first two seasons of college basketball for the University of Oregon. In his sophomore season in 2013–14 he was an honorable mention Academic All-Pac-12 selection.

Carter then transferred to and played for UNLV, where earned his bachelor's degree. He sat out the 2014–15 season at UNLV as a redshirt. Carter averaged 8.6 points and six rebounds in his first and only year at UNLV.

Carter transferred to Michigan State University in the summer of 2016. He was granted a sixth year of eligibility the summer of 2017. Carter spent two years at Michigan State University as a graduate transfer. He sat out the 2016–17 season after suffering his second left knee injury in nine months, and averaged 0.7 points and 1.2 rebounds in 7.7 minutes over 23 games in 2017–18, while struggling with an ankle injury.

== Professional basketball ==
In March 2018 Carter signed with the Hapoel Jerusalem basketball club.

As of 2020, he plays for Hapoel Eilat of the Israel Basketball Premier League. In 2020-21 he averaged 8.5 points, 4.6 rebounds, and 1.3 assists per game, as he shot 55% from the field.
