= Matt McQuaid =

American basketball player

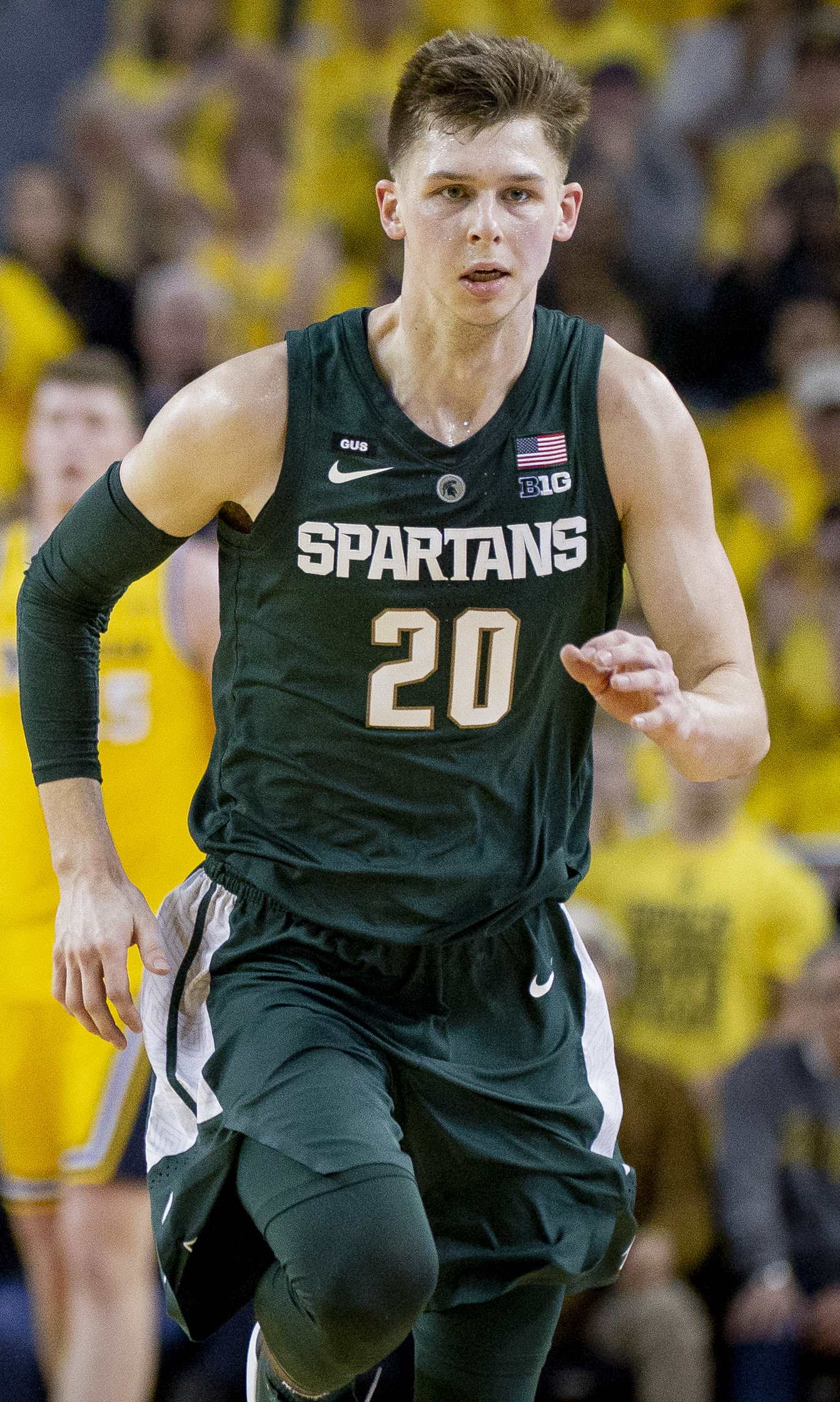
- McQuaid with Michigan State in February 2019

Michigan State Spartans
- Title: Assistant director of operations
- League: Big Ten Conference

Personal information
- Born: September 28, 1995 (age 31) Duncanville, Texas, U.S.
- Listed height: 6 ft 5 in (1.96 m)
- Listed weight: 200 lb (91 kg)

Career information
- High school: Duncanville (Duncanville, Texas)
- College: Michigan State (2015–2019)
- NBA draft: 2019: undrafted
- Playing career: 2019–2021
- Position: Shooting guard
- Number: 20

Career history
- 2019–2020: Skyliners Frankfurt
- 2021: Canton Charge

Career highlights
- Big Ten All-Defensive Team (2019)

Matthew Robert McQuaid (born September 28, 1995) is an American former basketball player. He is currently a coaching staff member of the Michigan State Spartans. He played professionally for the Canton Charge and Skyliners Frankfurt after playing college basketball for the Michigan State Spartans.

== Early life ==
McQuaid played for four different coaches at Duncanville High School in Duncanville, Texas. Prior to his senior season, he attended the LeBron James Skills Academy. As a senior, he averaged 17.8 points and 9.0 rebounds per game. McQuaid was named MVP of District 8-6A. In AAU competition, he played for Team Texas Elite. McQuaid originally committed to SMU before reopening his recruitment and eventually signing with Michigan State.

== College career ==
McQuaid averaged 3.5 points and 1.6 assists per game as a freshman. He worked on quickening his shot release and correcting his footwork. Prior to his sophomore season, McQuaid had double hernia surgery. He averaged 5.6 points and 1.9 rebounds per game while shooting 35.3 percent from behind the arc. On November 23, 2017, McQuaid scored a season-high 20 points against DePaul on six of eight shooting from behind the three-point line. As a junior, he averaged 6.0 points and 1.9 rebounds per game. McQuaid suffered a thigh bruise in the final of the Las Vegas Invitational against Texas and missed several games in late November and early December 2018. McQuaid scored 27 points in a 65–60 win over Michigan in the Big Ten Tournament final. As a senior at Michigan State, McQuaid started 35 of 39 games, averaging 9.8 points and 3.0 rebounds per game while shooting 42 percent from behind the arc. He helped the Spartans finish 32-7 and reach the Final Four of the NCAA Tournament. McQuaid was an honorable mention All-Big Ten selection by the media and coaches and was selected to the All-Defensive Team, as well as earning the team's John E. Benington Defensive Player of the Year Award.

== Professional career ==
=== Fraport Skyliners (2019–2020) ===
After going undrafted in the 2019 NBA draft, McQuaid played in four NBA Summer League games for the Detroit Pistons, averaging 2.0 minutes and 0.3 rebounds per game. In August 2019, McQuaid signed with the Fraport Skyliners of the Basketball Bundesliga with an option for another season. He averaged 5.9 points, 1.2 rebounds and 0.8 steals per game.

=== Canton Charge (2021) ===
On January 29, 2021, the Canton Charge announced that they had acquired McQuaid from available player pool.

== Coaching career ==
On June 7, 2021, McQuaid became the assistant director of operations of the Michigan State Spartans.

== Personal life ==
McQuaid is the son of Rob McQuaid, who played basketball at Central Michigan for two years before transferring to Midwestern State in 1981. His older sister Andrea played college volleyball at Oklahoma and Alabama and played professionally overseas, and his older brother Mike was on the golf team at Mary Hardin-Baylor.
