= Madison Academy (Alabama) =

Coordinates: 34°42′11″N 86°42′25″W

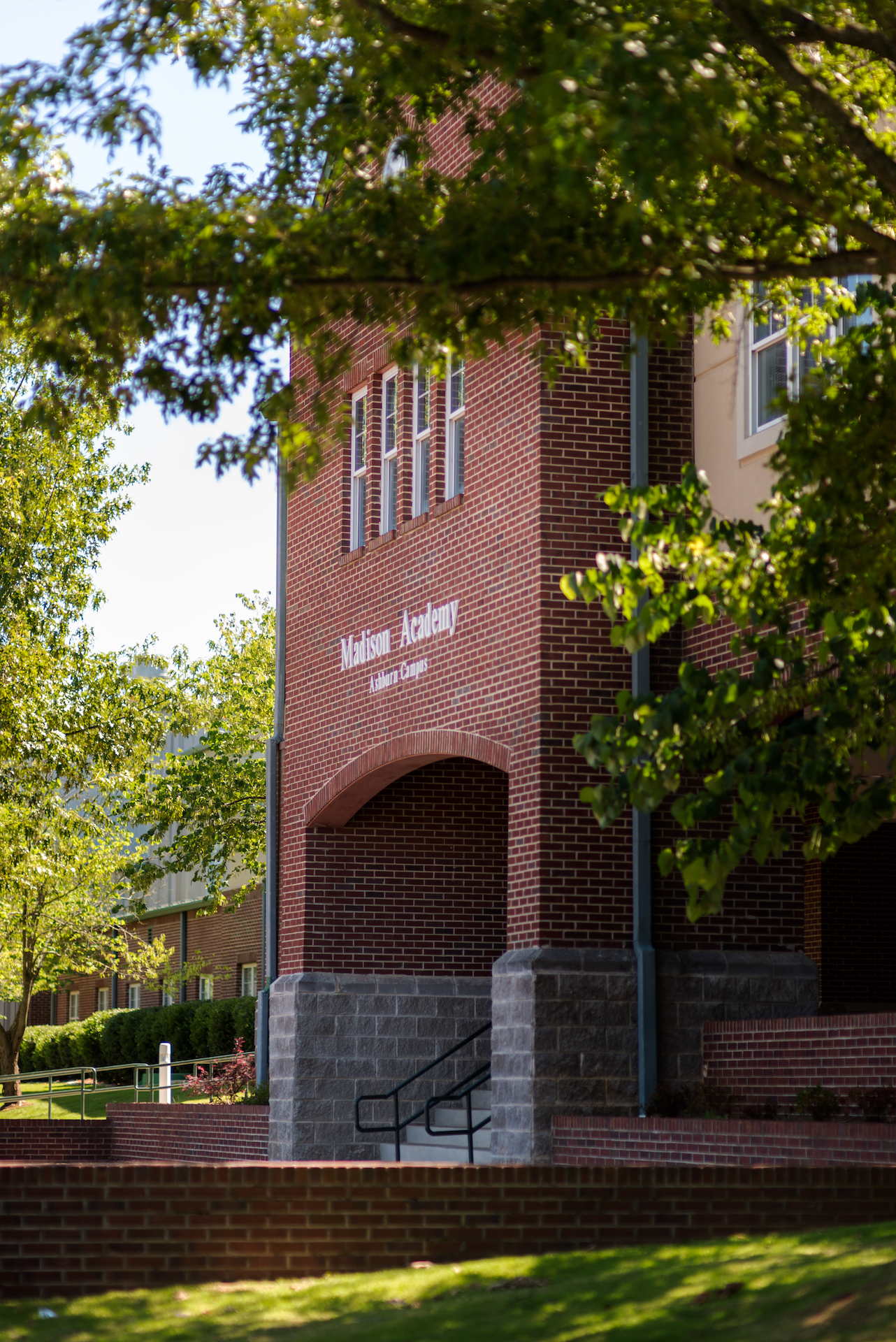

Location
- 325 Slaughter Road; Madison, Alabama 35758; United States

Information
- Type: Private, Coeducational
- Religious affiliation: Church of Christ
- Opened: 1955 (71 years ago)
- CEEB code: 011468
- Grades: Preschool-12
- Enrollment: 846
- Hours in school day: 7:45/8:00 A.M. - 2:30/3:00 P.M.
- Colors: Maroon, white and gold
- Nickname: Mustangs
- Website: www.macademy.org

Madison Academy is a private, co-educational school located in Huntsville, Alabama, United States. The school is near the city of Madison, Alabama, but is actually in the city of Huntsville. It got its name from Madison County and was originally located on Max Luther Drive near Meridian Street in Huntsville. It serves students in preschool through 12th grade. (Preschool - 1st are in "Little MA", while 2nd - 12th attend school in the main MA building.) The school is affiliated with and endorsed by many area churches of Christ. It competes in athletics in the Alabama High School Athletic Association as the “Madison Academy Mustangs".

Madison Academy has a current enrollment of 885 students.

== Notable alumni ==
- Don Black, neo-Nazi, white supremecist, "grand wizard" of the Ku Klux Klan and founder of the Stormfront website.
- Kerron Johnson, former professional basketball player.
- Kerryon Johnson, former NFL running back.
- Chandler Mack, Bulldog of the Harlem Globetrotters.
- Jordan Matthews, former NFL wide receiver.
