= Cousino High School =

Public school in Warren, Michigan, US

Paul K. Cousino Senior High School

Location
- 30333 Hoover Rd. Warren, MI 48093; 42.5162°N 83.0097°W

Information
- Type: Public
- Established: 1962
- School district: Warren Consolidated Schools
- Principal: Andre Buford
- Staff: 55.80 (FTE)
- Grades: 9-12
- Enrollment: 1,253 (2023-2024)
- Student to teacher ratio: 22.46
- Colors: red, white and blue
- Mascot: Patriots
- Website: https://cousino.wcskids.com/

Paul K. Cousino Senior High School is a public secondary school located in Warren, Michigan. It lies on Hoover Road, just south of 13 Mile Road. As part of the Warren Consolidated Schools district, it serves the north Warren area and parts of southern Sterling Heights.

Cousino High School opened in 1962. It is one of three high schools in the Warren Consolidated Schools (WCS) district. The current principal is Andre Buford.

== Athletic programs ==
- Competitive Cheer-Varsity, JV
- Dance-Varsity, JV
- Baseball - Varsity, JV
- Basketball - Varsity, JV, Freshman
- Bowling-Varsity, JV
- Football - Varsity, JV, Freshmen
- Golf-Boys Varsity
- Hockey - Varsity
- Lacrosse - Varsity
- Tennis-Varsity, JV
- Track and field-Varsity, JV
- Sideline Cheer-Varsity, JV
- Soccer - Varsity, JV
- Softball - Varsity, JV
- Swimming-Varsity
- Volleyball - Varsity, JV, Freshmen
- Wrestling - Varsity, JV

== Technological capabilities ==
Paul K. Cousino Senior High School is home to the only school-owned radio station in Warren and Sterling Heights, 89.1 WPHS-FM. The 100-foot, 100-watt radio tower serves an area approximately 2 to 9 square miles (23 km^{2}) in size, depending on the weather conditions. Cousino also hosts an amateur television studio, WCS-TV, which broadcasts its works on various channels throughout Warren and Sterling Heights, depending on cable providers. The channel is no longer used for regular broadcasts and is now used for events only. However, the production studio is still used, and productions are posted to YouTube instead.
