= Warren High School =

Warren High School is the name of several high schools:

- Warren High School (Warren, Arkansas)
- Warren High School (Downey, California)
- Warren Township High School in Gurnee, Illinois
- Warren High School (Monmouth, Illinois)
- Warren High School (Warren, Illinois)
- Warren High School (Warren, Michigan)
- Warren High School (Vincent, Ohio)
- Warren Area High School, Warren, Pennsylvania
- Earl Warren High School in San Antonio, Texas
- Warren High School (Warren, Texas)
