= 2018–19 Purdue Boilermakers men's basketball team =

American college basketball season

2018–19 Purdue Boilermakers men's basketball

Big Ten regular season co-champions

NCAA tournament, Elite Eight
- Conference: Big Ten Conference

Ranking
- Coaches: No. 8
- AP: No. 13
- Record: 26–10 (16–4 Big Ten)
- Head coach: Matt Painter (14th season)
- Assistant coaches: Brandon Brantley (6th season); Greg Gary (8th season); Steve Lutz (2nd season)
- Home arena: Mackey Arena

2018–19 Big Ten Conference men's basketball standings
	Conf.				Overall
Team	W		L	PCT	W		L	PCT
No. 5 Michigan State †	16	–	4	.800	32	–	7	.821
No. 13 Purdue	16	–	4	.800	26	–	10	.722
No. 8 Michigan	15	–	5	.750	30	–	7	.811
No. 21 Wisconsin	14	–	6	.700	23	–	11	.676
Maryland	13	–	7	.650	23	–	11	.676
Iowa	10	–	10	.500	23	–	12	.657
Minnesota	9	–	11	.450	22	–	14	.611
Ohio State	8	–	12	.400	20	–	15	.571
Indiana	8	–	12	.400	19	–	16	.543
Penn State	7	–	13	.350	14	–	18	.438
Illinois	7	–	13	.350	12	–	21	.364
Rutgers	7	–	13	.350	14	–	17	.452
Nebraska	6	–	14	.300	19	–	17	.528
Northwestern	4	–	16	.200	13	–	19	.406
† 2019 Big Ten tournament winner Rankings from AP poll

The 2018–19 Purdue Boilermakers men's basketball team represented Purdue University in the 2018–19 NCAA Division I men's basketball season. Their head coach was Matt Painter in his 14th season with the Boilers. The team played their home games at Mackey Arena in West Lafayette, Indiana as members of the Big Ten Conference. With a win over Northwestern on March 9, 2019, the Boilermakers clinched a share of the Big Ten regular season championship, the school's 24th championship. They finished the season 26–10, 16–4 in Big Ten play to win a share of the Big Ten regular season championship, the school's conference-record 24th championship. As the No. 2 seed in the Big Ten tournament, they were upset by Minnesota in the quarterfinals. The received an at-large bid to the NCAA tournament as the No. 3 seed in the South region. They defeated Old Dominion, 61–48, in the first round before beating defending champion Villanova, 87–61, to advance to the Sweet Sixteen. In the Sweet Sixteen, they defeated Tennessee, 99–94 in overtime, to advance to the Elite Eight. There they lost to the eventual champion Virginia, 80–75 in overtime.

On October 12, 2018, Purdue signed Matt Painter to a rolling two-year contract extension, through the 2023–24 season. Following the conclusion of the regular season, Painter was named the Big Ten Coach of the Year.

== Previous season ==
The Boilermakers finished the 2017–18 season with a record thirty wins (30–7), 15–3 in Big Ten play to finish in a tie for second place. As the No. 3 seed in the Big Ten tournament, they defeated Rutgers and Penn State before losing to Michigan in the championship game. They received an at-large bid to the NCAA tournament as the No. 2 seed in the East region. They defeated Cal State Fullerton in the first round, but lost starting center Isaac Haas to a fractured elbow. Without Haas, they defeated Butler in the second round to advance to the Sweet Sixteen where they lost to No. 3 seed Texas Tech.

== Offseason ==
=== Departures ===
On March 26, 2018, sophomore guard Carsen Edwards announced he would enter the NBA draft, but would not sign with an agent. Edwards withdrew his name from the draft and returned for his junior season. On April 20, freshman Nojel Eastern announced he would also test the waters of the NBA draft without signing with an agent. Eastern also withdrew his name from the draft and returned to school.

Purdue lost four team members to graduation and one to transfer.

Name	Number	Pos.	Height	Weight	Year	Hometown	Notes
Vincent Edwards	12	F	6'8"	225	Sr	Middletown, OH	Graduated
Isaac Haas	44	C	7'2"	290	Sr	Hokes Bluff, AL	Graduated
Dakota Mathias	31	G	6'4"	200	Sr	Elida, OH	Graduated
Jacquil Taylor	23	F	6'10"	240	RS Jr	Cambridge, MA	Transferred to Hofstra
P. J. Thompson	11	G	5'10"	185	Sr	Indianapolis, IN	Graduated

=== Incoming transfers ===
Name	Number	Pos.	Height	Weight	Year	Hometown	Notes
Evan Boudreaux	12	F	6'8"	220	RS Junior	Lake Forest, IL	Dartmouth

=== 2018 recruiting class ===
College recruiting
Name	Hometown	School	Height	Weight	Commit date
Trevion Williams; C	Chicago, Illinois	Henry Ford II High School	6 ft 8 in (2.03 m)	250 lb (110 kg)	Jul 6, 2017
Trevion Williams; C	Recruit ratings: Scout: Rivals: 247Sports: ESPN:				
Emmanuel Dowuona; C	Miami, Florida	Westwood Christian School	6 ft 11 in (2.11 m)	220 lb (100 kg)	Sep 19, 2017
Emmanuel Dowuona; C	Recruit ratings: Scout: Rivals: 247Sports: ESPN:				
Eric Hunter; SG	Indianapolis, IN	Charles A. Tindley School	6 ft 3 in (1.91 m)	165 lb (75 kg)	Sep 25, 2017
Eric Hunter; SG	Recruit ratings: Scout: Rivals: 247Sports: ESPN:				
Overall recruit ranking:
Note: In many cases, Scout, Rivals, 247Sports, On3, and ESPN may conflict in their listings of height and weight.; In these cases, the average was taken. ESPN grades are on a 100-point scale.; Sources: "2018 Purdue Commits". Rivals.; "2018 Team Ranking". Rivals.

== Roster ==
2018–19 Purdue Boilermakers men's basketball team
Players
Coaches

Pos.	#	Name	Height	Weight	Year	Previous school	Hometown
F	1	Aaron Wheeler	6 ft 9 in (2.06 m)	200 lb (91 kg)	RS Fr	Brewster Academy	Stamford, Connecticut
G	2	Eric Hunter Jr.	6 ft 3 in (1.91 m)	165 lb (75 kg)	Fr	Tindley Prep	Indianapolis, Indiana
G	3	Carsen Edwards	6 ft 1 in (1.85 m)	200 lb (91 kg)	Jr	Atascocita High School	Atascocita, Texas
C	4	Emmanuel Dowuona (redshirt)	6 ft 11 in (2.11 m)	230 lb (104 kg)	Fr	Westwood Christian	Miami, Florida
F	12	Evan Boudreaux	6 ft 8 in (2.03 m)	220 lb (100 kg)	RS Jr	Dartmouth	Lake Forest, Illinois
G	14	Ryan Cline	6 ft 6 in (1.98 m)	195 lb (88 kg)	Sr	Carmel High School	Carmel, Indiana
G	15	Tommy Luce	5 ft 10 in (1.78 m)	150 lb (68 kg)	Jr	Jeffersonville High School	Jeffersonville, Indiana
G	20	Nojel Eastern	6 ft 6 in (1.98 m)	220 lb (100 kg)	So	Evanston Township High School	Evanston, Illinois
F	23	Kyle King (W)	6 ft 6 in (1.98 m)	215 lb (98 kg)	Fr	St. Charles North High School	St. Charles, Illinois
F	24	Grady Eifert	6 ft 6 in (1.98 m)	220 lb (100 kg)	Sr	Bishop Dwenger High School	Fort Wayne, Indiana
F	32	Matt Haarms	7 ft 3 in (2.21 m)	250 lb (113 kg)	RS So	Sunrise Christian Academy	Amsterdam, the Netherlands
F	50	Trevion Williams	6 ft 9 in (2.06 m)	280 lb (127 kg)	Fr	Henry Ford Academy	Chicago, Illinois
G	55	Sasha Stefanovic	6 ft 4 in (1.93 m)	195 lb (88 kg)	RS Fr	Crown Point High School	Crown Point, Indiana

Head coach

- Matt Painter (Purdue)

Assistant coach(es)

- Steve Lutz (Texas Lutheran)
- Greg Gary (Tulane)
- Brandon Brantley (Purdue)

Legend

- (C) Team captain
- (S) Suspended
- (I) Ineligible
- (W) Walk-on
- Injured
- Current redshirt

Roster

== Schedule and results ==
The 2018–19 season will mark the first time in Big Ten history that the teams will play a 20-game conference schedule, setting a precedent for all Division I basketball. The new schedule will also include a regional component to increase the frequency of games among teams in similar areas. Over the course of a six-year cycle (12 playing opportunities), in-state rivals will play each other 12 times, regional opponents will play 10 times, and all other teams will play nine times. Three in-state series will be guaranteed home-and-homes: Illinois and Northwestern, Indiana and Purdue, and Michigan and Michigan State will always play twice. Purdue announced a home and home series with Texas on May 17, 2018, to be played in Austin in 2018 and in West Lafayette in 2019.

Date time, TV	Rank^{#}	Opponent^{#}	Result	Record	High points	High rebounds	High assists	Site (attendance) city, state
Exhibition
November 1, 2018*; 7:00 pm, BTN Plus	No. 24	Marian (IN)	W 75–56	–	23 – Cline	5 – Tied	5 – Tied	Mackey Arena (13,588); West Lafayette, IN
Regular season
November 6, 2018*; 7:00 pm, BTN Plus	No. 24	Fairfield	W 90–57	1–0	30 – Edwards	10 – Eifert	8 – Cline	Mackey Arena (14,323); West Lafayette, IN
November 10, 2018*; 8:00 pm, BTN	No. 24	Ball State; Charleston Classic non-bracket game	W 84–75	2–0	23 – Edwards	9 – Eastern	5 – Tied	Mackey Arena (14,804); West Lafayette, IN
November 15, 2018*; 5:00 pm, ESPN2	No. 23	vs. Appalachian State; Charleston Classic Quarterfinals	W 92–70	3–0	25 – Edwards	8 – Boudreaux	4 – Hunter	TD Arena (4,017); Charleston, SC
November 16, 2018*; 6:30 pm, ESPNU	No. 23	vs. Davidson; Charleston Classic semifinals	W 79–58	4–0	29 – Edwards	7 – Boudreaux	4 – Haarms	TD Arena (4,135); Charleston, SC
November 18, 2018*; 8:30 pm, ESPN2	No. 23	vs. No. 16 Virginia Tech; Charleston Classic championship	L 83–89	4–1	26 – Edwards	7 – Tied	7 – Edwards	TD Arena (3,985); Charleston, SC
November 23, 2018*; 2:00 pm, BTN	No. 24	Robert Morris	W 84–46	5–1	19 – Edwards	8 – Eifert	6 – Hunter Jr.	Mackey Arena (12,859); West Lafayette, IN
November 28, 2018*; 9:00 pm, ESPN2	No. 19	at No. 15 Florida State; ACC–Big Ten Challenge	L 72–73	5–2	24 – Edwards	8 – Boudreaux	4 – Edwards	Donald L. Tucker Civic Center (9,978); Tallahassee, FL
December 1, 2018; 3:30 pm, ESPN	No. 19	at No. 7 Michigan	L 57–76	5–3 (0–1)	19 – Edwards÷	6 – Edwards	3 – Tied	Crisler Center (12,707); Ann Arbor, MI
December 6, 2018; 7:00 pm, BTN		No. 23 Maryland	W 62–60	6–3 (1–1)	20 – Edwards	6 – Haarms	4 – Cline	Mackey Arena (14,242); West Lafayette, IN
December 9, 2018*; 6:00 pm, ESPN2		at Texas	L 68–72	6–4	40 – Edwards	5 – Eastern	3 – Tied	Frank Erwin Center (10,048); Austin, TX
December 15, 2018*; 1:30 pm, CBS		vs. Notre Dame; Crossroads Classic	L 80–88	6–5	27 – Edwards	7 – Boudreaux	5 – Cline	Bankers Life Fieldhouse (18,743); Indianapolis, IN
December 20, 2018*; 7:00 pm, BTN		Ohio	W 95–67	7–5	30 – Edwards	8 – Williams	5 – Edwards	Mackey Arena (13,840); West Lafayette, IN
December 29, 2018*; 4:30 pm, FS1		Belmont	W 73–62	8–5	24 – Edwards	9 – Eifert	3 – Cline	Mackey Arena (14,804); West Lafayette, IN
January 3, 2019; 7:00 pm, BTN		No. 25 Iowa	W 86–70	9–5 (2–1)	21 – Edwards	5 – Tied	6 – Cline	Mackey Arena (13,701); West Lafayette, IN
January 8, 2019; 9:00 pm, ESPN2		at No. 6 Michigan State	L 59–77	9–6 (2–2)	13 – Williams	12 – Williams	3 – Tied	Breslin Center (14,797); East Lansing, MI
January 11, 2019; 9:00 pm, FS1		at Wisconsin	W 84–80 ^{OT}	10–6 (3–2)	36 – Edwards	11 – Williams	3 – Tied	Kohl Center (17,152); Madison, WI
January 15, 2019; 7:00 pm, BTN		Rutgers	W 89–54	11–6 (4–2)	19 – Edwards	13 – Williams	6 – Edwards	Mackey Arena (14,804); West Lafayette, IN
January 19, 2019; 2:00 pm, FOX		No. 25 Indiana; Rivalry/Crimson and Gold Cup	W 70–55	12–6 (5–2)	20 – Edwards	10 – Eastern	7 – Edwards	Mackey Arena (14,804); West Lafayette, IN
January 23, 2019; 7:00 pm, BTN		at Ohio State	W 79–67	13–6 (6–2)	27 – Edwards	7 – Haarms	4 – Tied	Value City Arena (12,736); Columbus, OH
January 27, 2019; 1:00 pm, CBS		No. 6 Michigan State	W 73–63	14–6 (7–2)	17 – Cline	11 – Eastern	4 – Cline	Mackey Arena (14,804); West Lafayette, IN
January 31, 2019; 6:30 pm, FS1	No. 17	at Penn State	W 99–90 ^{OT}	15–6 (8–2)	38 – Edwards	10 – Eastern	4 – Tied	Bryce Jordan Center (8,961); University Park, PA
February 3, 2019; 12:00 pm, BTN	No. 17	Minnesota	W 73–63	16–6 (9–2)	17 – Edwards	8 – Haarms	5 – Edwards	Mackey Arena (14,804); West Lafayette, IN
February 9, 2019; 8:30 pm, BTN	No. 15	Nebraska	W 81–62	17–6 (10–2)	27 – Edwards	10 – Eastern	4 – Eastern	Mackey Arena (14,804); West Lafayette, IN
February 12, 2019; 6:30 pm, BTN	No. 12	at No. 24 Maryland	L 56–70	17–7 (10–3)	24 – Edwards	9 – Edwards	2 – Hunter Jr.	Xfinity Center (14,813); College Park, MD
February 16, 2019; 4:00 pm, BTN	No. 12	Penn State	W 76–64	18–7 (11–3)	21 – Edwards	8 – Eifert	4 – Cline	Mackey Arena (14,804); West Lafayette, IN
February 19, 2019; 7:00 pm, ESPN2	No. 15	at Indiana; Rivalry/Crimson and Gold Cup	W 48–46	19–7 (12–3)	11 – Cline	9 – Eastern	4 – Edwards	Simon Skjodt Assembly Hall (17,222); Bloomington, IN
February 23, 2019; 4:00 pm, BTN	No. 15	at Nebraska	W 75–72	20–7 (13–3)	17 – Haarms	9 – Haarms	5 – Cline	Pinnacle Bank Arena (15,652); Lincoln, NE
February 27, 2019; 8:30 pm, BTN	No. 14	Illinois	W 73–56	21–7 (14–3)	23 – Edwards	10 – Haarms	7 – Cline	Mackey Arena (14,804); West Lafayette, IN
March 2, 2019; 2:00 pm, ESPN	No. 14	Ohio State	W 86–51	22–7 (15–3)	25 – Edwards	7 – Wheeler	4 – Cline	Mackey Arena (14,804); West Lafayette, IN
March 5, 2019; 8:00 pm, BTN	No. 11	at Minnesota	L 69–73	22–8 (15–4)	22 – Edwards	14 – Eifert	5 – Eastern	Williams Arena (10,062); Minneapolis, MN
March 9, 2019; 2:30 pm, BTN	No. 11	at Northwestern	W 70–57	23–8 (16–4)	21 – Edwards	7 – Williams	5 – Edwards	Welsh–Ryan Arena (7,039); Evanston, IL
Big Ten tournament
March 15, 2019; 7:00 pm, BTN	(2) No. 13	vs. (7) Minnesota; Quarterfinals	L 73–75	23–9	16 – Haarms	9 – Williams	8 – Cline	United Center (17,369); Chicago, IL
NCAA tournament
March 21, 2019*; 9:50 pm, TBS	(3 S) No. 13	vs. (14 S) Old Dominion; First Round	W 61–48	24–9	26 – Edwards	7 – Tied	4 – Tied	XL Center (14,695); Hartford, CT
March 23, 2019*; 8:40 pm, TNT	(3 S) No. 13	vs. (6 S) No. 23 Villanova; Second Round	W 87–61	25–9	42 – Edwards	9 – Haarms	5 – Eifert	XL Center (15,031); Hartford, CT
March 28, 2019*; 7:29 pm, TBS	(3 S) No. 13	vs. (2 S) No. 6 Tennessee; Sweet Sixteen	W 99–94 ^{OT}	26–9	29 – Edwards	10 – Eifert	4 – Cline	KFC Yum! Center (19,831); Louisville, KY
March 30, 2019*; 8:49 pm, TBS	(3 S) No. 13	vs. (1 S) No. 2 Virginia; Elite Eight	L 75–80 ^{OT}	26–10	42 – Edwards	7 – Williams	3 – Eastern	KFC Yum! Center (21,623); Louisville, KY
*Non-conference game. ^{#}Rankings from AP Poll. (#) Tournament seedings in parentheses. S=South. All times are in Eastern Time.

== Rankings ==
Ranking movements Legend: ██ Increase in ranking ██ Decrease in ranking — = Not ranked RV = Received votes
	Week																				
Poll	Pre	1	2	3	4	5	6	7	8	9	10	11	12	13	14	15	16	17	18	19	Final
AP	24	24	23	24	19	RV	RV	RV	RV	RV	RV	RV	RV	17	15	12	15	14	11	13	Not released
Coaches	22	22^	22	19	18	24	RV	RV	—	RV	—	RV	RV	18	15	11	13	12	9	12	8

*AP does not release post-NCAA Tournament rankings
^Coaches did not release a Week 2 poll.
