= 2018–19 Michigan State Spartans men's basketball team =

American college basketball season

2018–19 Michigan State Spartans men's basketball

Big Ten regular season co-champions Big Ten tournament champions Las Vegas Invitational champions

NCAA tournament, Final Four
- Conference: Big Ten Conference

Ranking
- Coaches: No. 3
- AP: No. 5
- Record: 32–7 (16–4 Big Ten)
- Head coach: Tom Izzo (24th season)
- Associate head coach: Dwayne Stephens (16th season)
- Assistant coaches: Mike Garland (12th season); Dane Fife (8th season)
- Captains: Matt McQuaid; Joshua Langford
- Home arena: Breslin Center

2018–19 Big Ten Conference men's basketball standings
	Conf.				Overall
Team	W		L	PCT	W		L	PCT
No. 5 Michigan State †	16	–	4	.800	32	–	7	.821
No. 13 Purdue	16	–	4	.800	26	–	10	.722
No. 8 Michigan	15	–	5	.750	30	–	7	.811
No. 21 Wisconsin	14	–	6	.700	23	–	11	.676
Maryland	13	–	7	.650	23	–	11	.676
Iowa	10	–	10	.500	23	–	12	.657
Minnesota	9	–	11	.450	22	–	14	.611
Ohio State	8	–	12	.400	20	–	15	.571
Indiana	8	–	12	.400	19	–	16	.543
Penn State	7	–	13	.350	14	–	18	.438
Illinois	7	–	13	.350	12	–	21	.364
Rutgers	7	–	13	.350	14	–	17	.452
Nebraska	6	–	14	.300	19	–	17	.528
Northwestern	4	–	16	.200	13	–	19	.406
† 2019 Big Ten tournament winner Rankings from AP poll

The 2018–19 Michigan State Spartans men's basketball team represented Michigan State University in the 2018–19 NCAA Division I men's basketball season. The Spartans were led by 24th-year head coach Tom Izzo and played their home games at Breslin Center in East Lansing, Michigan as members of the Big Ten Conference.

With a win over in-state rival Michigan on March 9, 2019, the Spartans earned a share of the Big Ten regular season championship, marking back-to-back championships for the school. It also marked the school's ninth conference championship under Tom Izzo. They finished the season 32–7, 16–4 to earn a share of the Big Ten championship. As the No. 1 seed in the Big Ten tournament, they defeated Ohio State, Wisconsin, and Michigan for the third time on the season to win the tournament championship. The win over Ohio State on March 15, marked Tom Izzo's 600th career win. The Tournament win marked the school's sixth championship, the most in the Big Ten. The Spartans received the conference's automatic bid to the NCAA tournament as the No. 2 seed in the East Region. There they defeated Bradley and Minnesota to advance to the team's first Sweet Sixteen since 2015. In the Sweet Sixteen, they defeated No. 3-seeded LSU to advance to the Elite Eight. There they defeated overall No. 1 seed Duke to advance to the school's 10th Final Four and eighth under Izzo. In the Final Four, they lost to No. 3-seeded Texas Tech.

Guard Cassius Winston was named the Big Ten Player of the Year, the ninth time a player in MSU history had received the award. Winston was also named to several All-American lists, including the AP and Sporting News first team.

== Previous season ==
The Spartans finished the 2017–18 season 30–5, 16–2 in Big Ten play to win the regular season championship. As the No. 1 seed in the Big Ten tournament, they beat Wisconsin in the quarterfinals before losing to Michigan in the semifinals. The Spartans received an at-large bid to the NCAA tournament, their 21st consecutive trip under Izzo, as the No. 3 seed in the Midwest region. They defeated No. 14 Bucknell in the first round before losing to No. 11-seeded Syracuse in the second round. As a result, the Spartans failed to make the Sweet Sixteen for the third consecutive year, a first for the Spartans with Izzo as head coach. The 16 Big Ten wins for the Spartans marked a school record and the 30 overall wins was only the fourth time in school history that the Spartans had won at least 30 games (all under Izzo).

The Spartans were led by Miles Bridges (17.1 points and 7.0 rebounds per game), Cassius Winston (12.4 points and 6.9 assists per game), and Nick Ward (12.1 points and 7.1 rebounds per game).

== Offseason ==
=== Departures ===
On March 28, 2018, Miles Bridges announced he would hire an agent and declared for the NBA draft, ending his college career. On April 2, Jaren Jackson Jr. announced he would also enter the draft and sign with an agent.

Name	Number	Pos.	Height	Weight	Year	Hometown	Notes
Miles Bridges	22	G/F	6'7"	225	Sophomore	Flint, MI	NBA draft
Ben Carter	13	F	6'9"	235	Graduate Student	Las Vegas, NV	Graduated
Jaren Jackson Jr.	2	F	6'11"	242	Freshman	Carmel, IN	NBA draft
Lourawls "Tum Tum" Nairn Jr.	11	G	5'10"	175	Senior	Nassau, Bahamas	Graduated
Gavin Schilling	34	F	6'9"	245	RS Senior	Chicago, IL	Graduated

=== Recruiting class ===
On April 5, 2016, four-star power forward Thomas Kithier announced he would attend Michigan State. On November 22, 2016, four-star point guard Foster Loyer committed to MSU. He is the son of former Detroit Pistons Head Coach John Loyer. After receiving an offer three days prior, four-star small forward Gabe Brown announced on June 20, 2017 that he will play for the Spartans in 2018. On June 30, 2017, three-star power forward Marcus Bingham Jr. announced he would play for MSU in 2018. On September 11, 2017, four-star small forward Aaron Henry committed to play basketball at MSU in 2018. According to scout.com, after the commit of Aaron Henry, the Spartans had the third best recruiting class in 2018.

College recruiting
Name	Hometown	School	Height	Weight	Commit date
Marcus Bingham Jr. PF	Grand Rapids, MI	Catholic Central High School	6 ft 9 in (2.06 m)	200 lb (91 kg)	Jun 30, 2017
Marcus Bingham Jr. PF	Recruit ratings: Scout: Rivals: 247Sports: (83)				
Gabe Brown; SF	Ypsilanti, MI	Belleville High School	6 ft 7 in (2.01 m)	200 lb (91 kg)	Jun 20, 2017
Gabe Brown; SF	Recruit ratings: Scout: Rivals: 247Sports: (84)				
Aaron Henry; SF	Indianapolis, IN	Ben Davis High School	6 ft 5 in (1.96 m)	200 lb (91 kg)	Sep 11, 2017
Aaron Henry; SF	Recruit ratings: Scout: Rivals: 247Sports: (NR)				
Thomas Kithier; PF	Clarkston, MI	Dakota High School	6 ft 9 in (2.06 m)	225 lb (102 kg)	Nov 22, 2016
Thomas Kithier; PF	Recruit ratings: Scout: Rivals: 247Sports: (81)				
Foster Loyer; PG	Clarkston, MI	Clarkston High School	6 ft 0 in (1.83 m)	157 lb (71 kg)	Nov 22, 2016
Foster Loyer; PG	Recruit ratings: Scout: Rivals: 247Sports: (85)				
Overall recruit ranking: Scout: No. 14 Rivals: No. 11 ESPN: No. 12
Note: In many cases, Scout, Rivals, 247Sports, On3, and ESPN may conflict in their listings of height and weight.; In these cases, the average was taken. ESPN grades are on a 100-point scale.; Sources:

=== Coaching rumors ===
Following a tumultuous season off the court, it was rumored that the Orlando Magic were interested in at least interviewing Tom Izzo for their vacant head coaching position. Shortly thereafter, it was reported that Izzo would not take the job.

=== Early offseason rankings ===
In April 2018, most early pollsters included Michigan State as a preseason top-15 team for the 2018–19 season. These included ESPN (No. 11), Sports Illustrated (No. 12), Yahoo! Sports (No. 9), USA Today (No. 8), NBC Sports (No. 13), CBS Sports (No. 11), Sporting News (No. 10), and Bleacher Report (No. 19).

Following the deadline to withdraw from the NBA draft, many media outlets released updated early top 25 rankings for the 2017–18 season. Most pollsters included Michigan State in the preseason top 25 for the 2018–19 season: ESPN (No. 9), Sports Illustrated (No. 9), NBC Sports (No. 13), and CBS Sports (No. 11).

=== Returning players ===
On March 29, 2018, Nick Ward announced he too would enter the NBA draft, but he would not sign with an agent. On May 29, one day before the deadline to withdraw from the draft, Ward announced he would return to Michigan State.

== Preseason ==
Shortly after the team started practice in late September 2018, head coach Tom Izzo announced that Matt McQuaid and Joshua Langford had been named team captains.

On October 5, Michigan State held its annual Midnight Madness at Breslin Center. Tom Izzo appeared via a magic trick and the school announced a celebration of the 40th anniversary of the 1979 NCAA National Championship team led by Earvin "Magic" Johnson. The team announced they would wear throwback 1979 jerseys as they celebrated "40 Years of Magic."

=== Preseason rankings ===
In its preseason college preview, Lindy's Sports ranked Michigan State No. 10 in the country. The Blue Ribbon Yearbook also listed MSU as No. 10. Athlon Sports also ranked MSU as No. 10 in the country and picked the Spartans to win the Big Ten. The Spartans were ranked 10th in both the AP and Coaches preseason polls.

=== Preseason Big Ten Poll ===
Prior to the conference's annual media day, awards and a poll were chosen by a panel of 28 writers, two for each team in the conference. Michigan State was picked to win the conference, receiving 24 of the 28 first place votes. Cassius Winston was named first-team All-Big Ten.

At the Big Ten media day, Cassius Winston and Nick Ward were named to the 10-member All-Big Ten Preseason Team.

=== "Secret" scrimmage ===
On October 27, 2018, the Spartans scrimmaged against No. 3-ranked Gonzaga at Target Center in Minneapolis. The scrimmage consisted of two 20-minute halves that both began scoreless, as well as two five-minute periods for freshmen and walk-ons. Gonzaga won both halves, 58–46 in the first and 52–46 in the second. Nick Ward led the Spartans with 22 points and 12 rebounds. Cassius Winston added 16 points and eight assists, but turned the ball over six times. Sophomore Xavier Tillman also had 16 points.

=== Exhibition ===
The Spartans played Tom Izzo's alma mater, Division II Northern Michigan, in an exhibition game at Breslin Center on October 30, 2018. The Spartans defeated the Wildcats 93–47 behind Nick Ward's 24 points and nine rebounds. Cassius Winston added 13 points and seven assists as MSU shot 49.2 percent from the field. Only freshman wing Aaron Henry played major minutes for the Spartans as the other members of MSU's five-man freshmen class did not enter the game until late in the first half.

== Regular season ==
=== Early non-conference games ===
==== Kansas ====
On November 6, 2018, MSU faced No. 1-ranked Kansas in the Champions Classic in Indianapolis. The Spartans struggled with Kansas' size on the inside and fell behind by as many as 17 in the first half. Nick Ward struggled throughout the game, shooting only 25% from the field. Joshua Langford, who led the Spartans with 18 points only scored three in the first half as MSU trailed by 14 at halftime. MSU also struggled from the free throw line, shooting only 65%, including less than 50% in the first half. Kenny Goins made three three-pointers and Langford scored 15 in the second half as MSU narrowed the lead to three with less than a minute remaining. However, the Spartans could not come closer, falling 92–87. Cassius Winston had 11 points in the loss and turned the ball over five times. Goins added a career-high 17 points and led the Spartans with 11 rebounds.

==== Florida Gulf Coast ====
On November 11, MSU opened its home schedule facing Florida Gulf Coast. Nick Ward recovered from his difficult game against the Jayhawks to shoot seven of 11 from the field and made 11 free throws while scoring 25 points to lead the Spartans. MSU's offense showed no issues, scoring 106 points in the blowout of the Eagles. However, MSU's defense allowed 82 points, much to the chagrin of Tom Izzo. Langford added 18 points while Cassius Winston scored 14 and added eight assists as MSU moved to 1–1 on the season.

==== Louisiana–Monroe ====
Three days later, MSU welcomed Louisiana–Monroe to Breslin Center. Nick Ward left the game midway through the first half with an ankle injury and only played five minutes. As a result, the game remained close through the opening minutes of the second half when Cassius Winston got hot, scoring 13 of his team-high 23 points early in the half. The Spartans then pulled away to win 80–59. Kenny Goins notched a career-high 15 rebounds while Xavier Tillman added 11 points and 13 rebounds in the win. After the game, Izzo said that he didn't think Ward's injury was anything serious.

==== Tennessee Tech ====
On November 18, Tennessee Tech visited Breslin and Spartans were unkind hosts. MSU obliterated the Golden Eagles by 68 points, tying the biggest win in school history and marking the largest win by a team under Tom Izzo. Nick Ward, started and showed no ill effects from his injury in the previous game as he scored 23 points in 23 minutes. MSU held the Eagles to only 14 first-half points in the win. Cassius Winston added 19 points and six assists as MSU moved to 3–1 on the season, winning 101–33.

==== Las Vegas Invitational ====
===== UCLA =====
The Spartans then traveled to Las Vegas to face UCLA in the Las Vegas Invitational on Thanksgiving. The No. 11-ranked Spartans ran the No. 17-ranked Bruins off the court, taking an early lead and leading 51–26 at the half. Cassius Winston again had 19 points while Nick Ward added 16. Kenny Goins notched 13 rebounds in the blowout as MSU led by as many as 29. Josh Langford added 14 points in the 87–67 blowout.

===== Texas =====
In the championship game of the Las Vegas Invitational, MSU faced Texas who had upset No. 7-ranked North Carolina the previous day. MSU turned the ball over repeatedly in the early minutes of the game and the Longhorns jumped out to a quick double digit lead. With eight minutes remaining in the first half, Texas pushed the lead to 19 and the Spartans looked out of sorts. However, Josh Langford took control for the Spartans, scoring 29 points as they roared back to take the lead early in the second half. MSU, helped by Cassius Winston's 20 points, held on to notch another double digit win, winning 78–68 to earn the Invitational championship and pushing their record to 5–1 on the season.

==== Louisville ====
On November 27, newly No. 9-ranked MSU traveled to face Louisville as part of the ACC–Big Ten Challenge. The Spartans, who played without starting guard Matt McQuaid who suffered a thigh bruise late against Texas, struggled against Louisville. Without McQuaid, Cassius Winston played the majority of the game at the point and, at times, showed fatigue. He would eventually foul out with about four minutes remaining in the game. MSU trailed by six at halftime, but narrowed the lead and eventually took the lead in the second half. However, missed free throws, nine in the game, resulted in the Spartans being unable to put the game away. In overtime, the Spartans could not get enough shots to fall as they lost 82–78. Kenny Goins notched a career-high 17 rebounds, but failed to take a shot or score a point in the game. Kyle Ahrens, starting for McQuaid, played well, scoring 15 points. The loss dropped MSU to 5–2 on the season.

=== Early non-conference games ===
==== Rutgers ====
MSU next traveled to face Rutgers to open the early portion of the Big Ten schedule on November 30. Rutgers, who sold out the RAC for the first time in November in over 20 years, started hot, taking an early lead. However, MSU, still playing without Matt McQuaid, rallied to take a two-point lead at the half. Cassius Winston scored a game-high 22 points as MSU opened a 13-point lead in the game. Rutgers brought the game close as the second half came to a close, but the Spartans held on to win by 11. Nick Ward played well, pouring in 20 points on seven of 12 shooting from the field. Joshua Langford added 14 as MSU moved to 6–2 on the season and 1–0 in Big Ten play.

==== Iowa ====
Three days later, the Spartans returned home for the first time in over two weeks to face No. 18 Iowa. Iowa took an early lead and kept the game close through most of the first half, but the MSU defense dominated the game. The Spartans held Iowa to 32.8% shooting from the field and 27.3% from three. MSU, behind Nick Ward's perfect 10–10 tonight pushed the lead to as many as 28 in the second half as they dominated the Hawkeyes in the game. Kenny Goins added a career-high 19 points and 14 points in the game while Xavier Tillman also added a career-high 14. Cassius Winston notched 12 assists in the game and turned the ball over only one time. The Spartans only committed eight turnovers in the game after entering the game averaging over 13 a game. The 90–68 win moved MSU to 7–2 on the season and 2–0 in Big Ten play.

=== Remaining non-conference games ===
==== Florida ====
MSU returned to non-conference play as they traveled to face Florida on December 8. MSU led for the majority of the game leading by as many as 12, but could never put the game away. The Spartans returned to their turnover struggles, giving the ball up 15 times in the game. Tom Izzo continued to shorten his bench as Matt McQuaid made his return though did not start. Only eight players saw the floor for MSU and Cassius Winston seemed to struggle with fatigue, scoring only 10 points on four of 13 shooting including 0–5 from three. Kyle Ahrens, who started his third straight game, finished the scoring for the Spartans with seven straight points including a dunk as the shot clock expired with less than 10 seconds remaining to give the Spartans the 63–59 win. Xavier Tillman led the Spartans with 14 points while Josh Langford and Nick Ward added 13 each. The win moved the Spartans to 8–2 on the season.

==== Green Bay ====
After eight days off for finals, the Spartans returned to play at Breslin Center against Green Bay. The Phoenix shot well from the field early, making 10 of their first 15 shots and taking a 24–20 lead. However, from there the Spartans dominated behind Nick Ward's career-high 28 points and led 64–35 at the half. Cassius Winston scored 16 points and dished out 12 assists in the blowout while Josh Langford added 13. MSU even played all five freshmen from its recruiting class at the same time late in the game as the Spartans won easily 104–83. Michigan State dominated the boards, out-rebounding Green Bay 56–34. The win moved the Spartans to 9–2 on the season.

==== Oakland ====
Five days later, the Spartans welcomed Oakland to East Lansing. Cassius Winston scored 26 points and Xavier Tillman had five assists as the Spartans blew out the Grizzlies 99–69. MSU shot 58.5% from the field in the rout of Oakland. However, the Spartans did allow 13 made three-pointers by Oakland which left Tom Izzo less than happy after the game. The win moved MSU to 10–2 on the season with only one non-conference game remaining.

==== Northern Illinois ====
In the final non-conference game of the season, MSU welcomed MSU alum and former Izzo assistant Mark Montgomery and his NIU Huskies to Breslin Center. The Spartans quickly out-paced the Huskies and dominated the first half, leading 43–19 at the break. Cassius Winston scored 24 points on six of seven shooting from three. Winston also dished out seven assists as Kenny Goins added 12 points in the blowout of the Huskies. Josh Langford struggled from the floor in the first half and did not play in the second with an ankle injury. The 88–60 win moved MSU to 11–2 on the season. After suffering this injury (combined with other injuries), Langford would not play in another game until the 2020–21 season.

=== Remaining conference games ===
==== Northwestern ====
Returning to the Big Ten season brought Northwestern to East Lansing on January 2. The Spartans played without Josh Langford who was in a boot before the game. Northwestern played well to start the game, but MSU went on a 26–8 run to end the first half to blow the game open. Nick Ward scored all 21 of his points in the first half as the Wildcats chose not to double team him. Leading by 20 at the half, MSU pushed the lead to as many as 32 in the second half before easing off the gas and winning by 26. Cassius Winston scored 13 points with 12 assists in the 81–55 win. The win moved Michigan State to 12–2 on the season and 3–0 in Big Ten play.

==== Ohio State ====
Three days later, MSU hit the road to take on No. 14-ranked Ohio State looking to move to 4–0 on the season. Cassius Winston struggled in the first half and was challenged by Tom Izzo at halftime. Winston responded, scoring 25 points to overcome a 43–36 halftime deficit. Nick Ward added 21 points and eight rebounds as the Spartans pulled away late to beat the Buckeyes by nine. The Spartans shot over 80% from the free throw line in the win including Ward who went 11–14. MSU moved to 13–2 on the season and 4–0 in conference. Josh Langford missed his second consecutive game.

==== Purdue ====
The newly AP-ranked No. 6 Spartans (No. 5 in the coaches poll) returned home to face Purdue on January 8. MSU started slow, trailing for the first 10 minutes of the first half, but overcame the slow start to take control of the game by halftime. The Big Ten's leading scorer, Purdue's Carsen Edwards, was contained by MSU's tough defense and limited to 12 points on four of 12 shooting in the game. Cassius Winston took control in the second half, scoring 23 points as the Spartans pulled away late to win 77–59. Nick Ward added 16 points as MSU played once again without Josh Langford. The win moved the Spartans to 14–2 on the season and 5–0 in Big Ten play.

==== Penn State ====
MSU returned to the road on January 13 to face Penn State. The Spartans were again without Josh Langford and Kyle Ahrens, Langford's replacement in the starting lineup, missed the game with a back injury. MSU led from the start, however. Nick Ward scored 16 points for the Spartans while Matt McQuaid scored 15 and Cassius Winston scored 11. Michigan State turned the ball over 17 times but only trailed for 10 seconds in the game, leading by as many as 21. The 71–56 win marked MSU's 10th straight win. However, Tom Izzo was not pleased after the game and said Winston played one of his worst games. The win tied the school record for consecutive regular season conference wins at 18.

==== Nebraska ====
The Spartans continued their road trip to face Nebraska in Lincoln. The game remained tight throughout the first half, but MSU pulled away late to earn a 70–64 win, without both Josh Langford or Kyle Ahrens for the second consecutive game. Cassius Winston rebounded from his poor outing against Penn State in the previous game and led the way with a career-high 29 points. Winston went over 1,00 career points for MSU in the game as Nick Ward also added 15 points and 10 rebounds. MSU's defense again held a star player in check, limiting James Palmer Jr. to six of 21 from the field, though he did score 24 points. The win improved the Spartans' record to 16–2 on the season and 7–0 in conference play and set a school record with their 19th straight conference regular season win.

==== Maryland ====
Four days later, Michigan State returned home to face No. 13-ranked Maryland. The Spartans jumped out to an early first half lead before Maryland tied the game at 20 in the first half. MSU, however, answered an 11–0 run to end the half and never trailed again. MSU moved the lead to as much as 22 in the second half and finished with a 69–55 victory. The win moved MSU to sole possession of first place in the Big Ten as the only remaining undefeated team in conference. Kenny Goins and Cassius Winston led the way in scoring with 14 points apiece. Kyle Ahrens returned from a back injury to score four points. Nick Ward had one of the worst games of his MSU career, battling foul trouble and failed to score. The win marked MSU's 20th consecutive Big Ten regular season victory, extending the school record. The win improved MSU's record to 17–2 on the season and 8–0 in conference.

==== Iowa ====
On January 24, the Spartans traveled to face No, 19 Iowa in Iowa City. In their seventh straight game without Josh Langford, the Spartans struggled in the first half and trailed by as many as eight later in the half. MSU was able to narrow the lead to only a four-point deficit at half time. Iowa increased its lead again to eight early in the second half before MSU countered with 24–2 run to put the game out of reach. MSU moved the lead to as many as 18 in the second half as Cassius Winston took control, scoring 23 points and Nick Ward poured in 21. The Spartans made 21 of 22 free throw attempts in the game which helped lead to the win. The win, the school's 21st straight regular season conference win, moved MSU to 18–2 and 9–0 on the season.

==== Purdue ====
Three days later, MSU traveled to face Purdue in West Lafayette. Purdue dominated from the start leading throughout the first half and pushing the halftime score to 37–19. Purdue pushed the lead to as many as 24 in the second half before the MSU offense roared back while MSU limited Purdue's offense. Behind Cassius Winston's 23 points and eight assists, the Spartans moved to within four points with less than three minutes remaining in the game. Tom Izzo then chose to foul Purdue guard Nojel Eastern who was a 45% free throw shooter, but he made six straight free throws to close out the game. The Spartans fell 73–63, ending their 15-game winning streak and their 21-game conference regular season streak. The loss moved the Spartans to 18–3 and 9–1 on the season.

==== Indiana ====
After playing three games in six days, the Spartans had five days to prepare for a visit from Indiana. A few days before the game, it was announced that guard Josh Langford, who had missed the previous eight games, would miss the remainder of the season. In an ESPN Gameday visit, the Spartans struggled from the foul line, making only eight of 22 free throws. The Hoosiers, who had lost seven straight games, led for most of the first half, but MSU narrowed the lead to three at the half. Cassius Winston scored 26 for the Spartans, but MSU, known for its rebounding, were outrebounded by Indiana including 20 offensive rebounds. As MSU struggled at the free throw line, the Spartans were unable to put the game away and had to settle for overtime. In overtime, Indiana's Romeo Langford led the way as the Hoosiers pulled out the 79–75 win over Michigan State. The loss was MSU's second straight loss, the first time they had lost two games in a row in a season since 2016. The loss also dropped MSU back into a first place tie with Michigan who had lost the night before to Iowa.

==== Illinois ====
MSU returned to the road to face Illinois at State Farm Center. Nick Ward did not start as Tom Izzo tried to send a message to his team. However, Illinois took an early lead and for the majority of the game as their intense defense forced the Spartans into 24 turnovers in the game. Cassius Winston alone had nine turnovers. However, the Spartans mounted a furious comeback late in the second half and even took the lead with just over six minutes left. However, Illinois went on a 15–8 run to end the game and notch the victory 79–74. MSU who had struggled from the free throw line against Indiana, made 23–25 against the Illini. The loss dropped MSU out of first place and put them a game behind Purdue and Michigan in the Big Ten standing with a 9–3 record, 18–5 overall.

==== Minnesota ====
Minnesota next visited the Spartans as MSU celebrated its 1979 National Championship team. MSU greats Earvin "Magic" Johnson, Greg Kelser, and others from the team were on hand as Michigan State thumped Minnesota 79–55. Nick Ward rebounded from his recent struggles and scored 22 points to lead all scorers while Matt McQuaid added 18 in the romp over the Golden Gophers. Cassius Winston only played 33 minutes in the game due to foul trouble in the first half and Kenny Goins left with an elbow injury, but MSU still dominated the game. MSU shot over 51% from the field and 40% from three in the win. The Spartans led throughout in the easy win over the struggling Gophers. The win ended MSU's three-game losing streak as they moved to 10–3 in conference and 19–5 overall.

==== Wisconsin ====
MSU returned to the road to face No. 20 Wisconsin looking to continue their winning ways. The game remained tight throughout as the teams exchanged baskets. Kenny Goins, who missed most of the previous game against Minnesota started and played well for the Spartans, scoring 12 points including three three-pointers as MSU was able to overcome Wisconsin's Ethan Happ who scored 20 points on the night. Cassius Winston led all scorers with 23 points and six assists as MSU was able to pull away at the end behind baskets by Goins and Nick Ward. Happ, struggled from the free throw line in the game, going 0–6 down the stretch. MSU pulled out the tough road win 67–59. The win, coupled with a Purdue loss earlier in the night and a surprise Michigan loss to Penn State, moved MSU back into a first place tie with Michigan at 11–3 in conference.

==== Ohio State ====
Ohio State traveled to East Lansing on February 17 looking to avenge a loss to the Spartans earlier in the season. OSU started well, leading for most of the first half and taking a six-point halftime lead. In the second half, MSU started without Nick Ward who was on the bench having his hand looked at by medical staff. Playing most of the half without Ward, the Spartans' defense clamped down holding the Buckeyes to only 13 points. Matt McQuaid (14 points) and Kenny Goins (10 rebounds) led MSU in the second half as they pulled away to win by 18, 62–44. Cassius Winston had 13 points and eight assists while Thomas Kithier played 10 important minutes in Ward's absence. Aaron Henry, after having a good game against Wisconsin earlier in the week, only played 10 minutes and was held scoreless. The win returned MSU to a first-place tie with Michigan atop the Big Ten standings at 12–3. Following the game, MSU announced that Ward had suffered a hairline fracture in his left hand and that he would be out indefinitely, further weakening the Spartans roster.

==== Rutgers ====
In their first game since Nick Ward broke his hand, MSU struggled early against Rutgers on February 20. Rutgers led for most of the first half and led a seven-point lead at halftime. In the second half, Cassius Winston and Xavier Tillman took over. Winston scored 19 of his game high 28 points in the second half as he led the Spartans to 46 points in the second half. Tillman, starting in place of the injured Ward, played a career-high 33 minutes and scored a career-high 19 points as MSU rallied to defeat the Scarlet Knights. Kyle Ahrens again injured his back, but still played 20 minutes for the injury-depleted Spartans. Four Spartans, Winston, Tillman, Kenny Goins, and Matt McQuaid played over 30 minutes in the game. The win kept the Spartans in first place tie with Michigan who won the next day.

==== Michigan ====
On February 24, MSU traveled to face rival Michigan with the lead in the Big Ten on the line. Playing again without Nick Ward, MSU played well, led by Cassius Winston's 27 points. Michigan had trouble with MSU's ball screen offense, but still led midway through the second half. Winston then took over, using ball screens to drive to the basket or to dish to open shooters as MSU retook the lead. MSU shot 50% from the field in the game while their defense limited Michigan's offense to less than 40%. Winston had eight assists in the game as MSU ended a three-game losing streak to Michigan. Kenny Goins added 16 points, while Xavier Tillman scored 14 as MSU was able to hold on for the surprising seven-point win 77–70 win. The win moved MSU to 14–3 and into first place in the conference and a game up on Michigan.

==== Indiana ====
With five days off and the conference championship in MSU's sights, the Spartans traveled to Indiana looking to avenge their earlier home loss to the Hoosiers. MSU, playing again without Nick Ward, led for the majority of the game, pushing the lead in to double figures in the second half. Despite shooting less than 38% from the field in the game, the Hoosiers narrowed the MSU lead late in the second half and took the lead on a free throw by Romeo Langford. With more than 30 seconds left in the game, the Hoosiers, fouled Cassius Winston with less than 10 seconds to go with a foul to give. MSU took a timeout to draw up a play for the winner, but Winston settled for a fall away jumper that came up short and the Hoosiers completed the season sweep of the Spartans. The loss dropped MSU to 14–4 in the conference, a game behind Purdue and tied with Michigan with two games remaining. The loss appeared to end the Spartans chances for a Big Ten championship.

==== Nebraska ====
MSU returned home to face a struggling Nebraska team. However, the Cornhuskers stayed close with the Spartans for the first 10 minutes, but MSU pulled away to lead by 18 at the half. Without Nick Ward for the fourth straight game, Kenny Goins led the Spartans with a career-high 24 points while Matt McQuaid also added a career-high 22 points. MSU led by more than 20 through portions of the second half, but Nebraska narrowed the lead to singled digits with 10 minutes remaining. However, MSU, who leaned more heavily on freshmen Thomas Kithier, Gabe Brown, and Aaron Henry than in previous games, extended the lead again to win by 15. Henry also had a career-high in points, scoring 15 including an emphatic dunk in the second half. Cassius Winston added eight points and 10 assists as he struggled with knee tendinitis and only played 31 minutes. The win coupled with a Purdue loss to Minnesota later that night, moved MSU back into a first place tie with Michigan and Purdue in the conference at 14–5.

==== Michigan ====
MSU welcomed Michigan to Breslin Center on March 9 for Senior Night with a share of the Big Ten championship on the line for the rivals. A win earlier in the day by Purdue meant that the winner of the game would earn a share of the Big Ten championship. Tom Izzo said before the game that Nick Ward could have played, but Izzo determined to hold him out until the Big Ten tournament. Michigan, like when the teams met 13 days prior, started off well, surging to an early lead throughout the first half. Foul trouble hit both teams as Cassius Winston sat the final minutes of the half with two fouls. Meanwhile, Michigan's Ignas Brazdeikis and Isaiah Livers each were limited in the first half with two fouls as well. Despite not having Winston on the floor, MSU kept Michigan within reach and only trailed by six at the half. The second half continued as the first had ended with Michigan maintaining its lead, but MSU kept within striking distance. Winston then took over, making five straight shots at one point as the Spartans surged into the lead. Winston finished with 23 points and seven assists. Xavier Tillman played well for the Spartans, notching 17 points while Kenny Goins added nine points and 16 rebounds. The Spartans dominated the board, outrebounding Michigan 46–20 and pulling away for the 75–63 win. The win gave the Spartans a share of the Big Ten title and marked back-to-back championships for the Spartans. MSU earned the No. 1 seed in the Big Ten tournament with the win as well.

== Postseason ==
=== Big Ten tournament ===
==== Ohio State ====
As the No. 1 seed in the Big Ten tournament, the Spartans faced Ohio State for third time on the season. The Buckeyes had beaten Indiana to advance to face Michigan State. Nick Ward returned for the Spartans, but did not start. He saw limited time, but played well, scoring eight points including a jump shot and free throw where he showed no ill affects from the broken hand. The Buckeyes kept the game close in the first half as Cassius Winston struggled. Freshman guard Foster Loyer stepped up for the Spartans, scoring 14 points off the bench, including three three-pointers to give MSU the lead. The Spartans extended their six-point halftime lead and were able to pull away in the second half and led by as many as 21 points. In an obvious attempt to reduce fatigue, Winston only played 22 minutes in the game and Tom Izzo lifted MSU's starters with two minutes remaining in the game. A late surge by the Buckeyes narrowed the lead, but MSU held on for a 77–70 win. The win marked the 600th career victory for Izzo, all at Michigan State.

==== Wisconsin ====
The following day, the Spartans faced off against Wisconsin, who MSU had defeated in Madison earlier in the season. Michigan State jumped out to a 18–4 lead within the first six minutes and never trailed in the game. Wisconsin kept the game within shouting distance for most of the game, but MSU pulled out the win 67–55. Cassius Winston led the Spartans with 21 points while Xavier Tillman added 17 points. Nick Ward again did not start, but played 11 minutes. He was saddled with foul trouble through most of the game and only scored two points. Winston injured his toe partway through the game and again saw his minutes restricted, playing only 28. The win sent MSU to the championship game of the Big Ten tournament.

==== Michigan State ====
On Selection Sunday, the Spartans squared off with Michigan for the third time in only two weeks, this time for the tournament championship. MSU, who won the previous two games against the Wolverines, started well, jumping out to a 17–11 lead halfway through the first half. However, Spartan guard Kyle Ahrens went down hard on his ankle while coming down with a rebound in the first half and was taken out on a stretcher with an air cast on his leg. Following the injury, Michigan finished the half outscoring the Spartans 10–6, giving them a 31–23 lead at the half. The Wolverines came out hot in the second half, causing the Spartans to fall behind 39–26 in the early going. The Spartans were able to dig deep and complete a 22–9 run, tying the game at 48. MSU trailed the Wolverines by five with just over two minutes remaining, but a Matt McQuaid three pointer and a Cassius Winston assist to Xavier Tillman tied the score at 60 with 1:20 left in the game. A missed Zavier Simpson three-pointer led to a Winston lay up and a Spartans' lead at 62–60 with 29 seconds left. The MSU defense forced Michigan into bad shot attempts and MSU finished by making three of four free throws to give them the 65–60 win. MSU finished the game on a 10–0 run to earn their first Big Ten tournament title since 2016. The win was the school's sixth tournament championship, which leads the Big Ten. The win also completed a three-game season sweep of in-state rival Michigan.

=== NCAA Tournament ===
==== Bradley ====
Despite winning the Big Ten regular season and tournament championships, MSU did not receive a No. 1 seed in the NCAA tournament. Instead, the Spartans received the No. 2 seed in the East Region. In the first round, they struggled against No. 15-seeded Bradley, and trailed with only four minutes left in the game. However, helped by a season-high 25-for-26 from the free throw line, the Spartans pulled away for the 76–65 win. Kenny Goins struggled in the game, making only one of 10 shots and missing all seven three-point attempts. Cassius Winston led the way for the Spartans, scoring 26 points while Xavier Tillman added 16. The win moved MSU to the second round to face Big Ten foe Minnesota.

==== Minnesota ====
In the earliest tournament meeting of Big Ten teams since the field had expanded to 64, the Spartans throttled Minnesota. MSU shot over 57% from the field while limiting the Gophers to 30%. MSU dominated Minnesota on the glass, out-rebounding the Gophers 45–19. Xavier Tillman led a balanced scoring attack for MSU with 14 points while Cassius Winston added 13. The Spartans blew out Minnesota 70–50 to advance to the Sweet Sixteen for the first time since 2015, the longest Sweet Sixteen drought for the Spartans under Tom Izzo.

==== LSU ====
In the Sweet Sixteen, MSU faced No. 3-seeded LSU. The Spartans dominated for a second consecutive game, jumping out to an early 8–0 lead, and never trailed in the game. Freshmen Gabe Brown (15 points) and Aaron Henry (20 points) each had career-highs in points as the Spartans ran away from the Tigers to an 80–63 victory. Cassius Winston added 17 points in the win as MSU led for the whole game. The win moved MSU to the Elite Eight for the first time since 2015, where they would face the No. 1 seed in the South region and overall No. 1 seed in the tournament, Duke.

==== Duke ====
In the Elite Eight, Izzo faced Duke Coach Mike Krzyzewski for the 13th time. Izzo had only beaten "Coach K" one time with a record of 1–11 against him coming in to this game. Cassius Winston tallied a double-double with 20 points and 10 assists while Xavier Tillman added 19 points and nine rebounds. However, MSU, who led at the half, trailed by one with less than a minute remaining. Kenny Goins hit a three-pointer with 34 seconds remaining in regulation to give Michigan State the lead. Duke had an opportunity to tie the game at the free throw line with five seconds remaining after Tillman was called for his fourth foul, however Duke freshman R.J. Barrett missed the first of two free throws and inadvertently made the second one. On the ensuing out-of-bounds play, Tillman passed the ball to Winston who sprinted ahead of Duke defenders and ran out the clock to secure the victory 68–67 victory. The Spartans snapped a seven-game losing streak against Duke and advanced to the Final Four for the first time since 2015. Winston was named the East regional's Most Outstanding Player.

==== Texas Tech ====
The Spartans faced No. 3-seeded Texas Tech in the Final Four on April 6, 2019. The visit marked the school's 10th Final Four and eighth under Tom Izzo. Texas Tech limited the Spartans to just under 32% shooting from the field and took a two-point lead in to halftime. The Spartans continued to struggle with the Red Raider defense in the second half, trailing throughout the half. Cassius Winston hit only four of his 16 shots and notched only two assists. Texas Tech moved the lead to 13 points with less than 10 minutes remaining, but the Spartans fought back to within one point. However, MSU could not complete the comeback and lost 61–51 ending their Tournament run.

== Roster ==
2018–19 Michigan State Spartans men's basketball team
Players
Coaches

Pos.	#	Name	Height	Weight	Year	Previous school	Hometown
G/F	0	Kyle Ahrens (injured)	6 ft 6 in (1.98 m)	210 lb (95 kg)	RS Jr	Versailles H.S.	Versailles, OH
F	30	Marcus Bingham Jr.	6 ft 11 in (2.11 m)	215 lb (98 kg)	Fr	Catholic Central High School	Grand Rapids, MI
F	13	Gabe Brown	6 ft 7 in (2.01 m)	210 lb (95 kg)	Fr	Belleville High School	Ypsilanti, MI
C	40	Braden Burke (W)	6 ft 11 in (2.11 m)	235 lb (107 kg)	RS So	Lakeshore H.S./Robert Morris	Stevensville, MI
G	41	Connor George	6 ft 4 in (1.93 m)	200 lb (91 kg)	RS Jr	Okemos H.S.	Okemos, MI
F	25	Kenny Goins	6 ft 7 in (2.01 m)	230 lb (104 kg)	RS Sr	Warren Mott H.S.	Troy, MI
F	11	Aaron Henry	6 ft 6 in (1.98 m)	210 lb (95 kg)	Fr	Ben Davis High School	Indianapolis, IN
G	10	Jack Hoiberg (W)	5 ft 11 in (1.8 m)	175 lb (79 kg)	RS Fr	Hinsdale Central H.S.	Burr Ridge, IL
F	15	Thomas Kithier	6 ft 8 in (2.03 m)	225 lb (102 kg)	Fr	Dakota High School	Clarkston, MI
G	1	Joshua Langford (injured) (C)	6 ft 5 in (1.96 m)	210 lb (95 kg)	Jr	Madison Academy	Huntsville, AL
G	3	Foster Loyer	6 ft 0 in (1.83 m)	170 lb (77 kg)	Fr	Clarkston High School	Clarkston, MI
F	20	Matt McQuaid (C)	6 ft 5 in (1.96 m)	200 lb (91 kg)	Sr	Duncanville H.S.	Duncanville, TX
F	23	Xavier Tillman	6 ft 8 in (2.03 m)	245 lb (111 kg)	So	Grand Rapids Christian H.S.	Grand Rapids, MI
F	44	Nick Ward	6 ft 9 in (2.06 m)	245 lb (111 kg)	Jr	Gahanna Lincoln	Gahanna, OH
G	14	Brock Washington (W)	6 ft 4 in (1.93 m)	185 lb (84 kg)	RS Fr	Southfield Christian School	Southfield, MI
G	5	Cassius Winston (C)	6 ft 1 in (1.85 m)	185 lb (84 kg)	Jr	University of Detroit Jesuit	Detroit, MI

Head coach

- Tom Izzo (Northern Michigan)

Assistant coach(es)

- Dwayne Stephens (Michigan State)
- Dane Fife (Indiana)
- Mike Garland (Northern Michigan)

Legend

- (C) Team captain
- (S) Suspended
- (I) Ineligible
- (W) Walk-on
- Injured
- Current redshirt

Roster

=== Depth chart ===
Pos.	Starting 5	Bench
C	Xavier Tillman	Nick Ward
PF	Kenny Goins	Thomas Kithier
SF	Aaron Henry	Gabe Brown
SG	Matt McQuaid
PG	Cassius Winston	Foster Loyer

== Schedule and results ==
The season marked the first time in Big Ten history that the teams played a 20-game conference schedule. The new schedule also includes a regional component to increase the frequency of games among teams in similar areas. Over the course of a six-year cycle (12 playing opportunities), in-state rivals will play each other 12 times, regional opponents will play 10 times, and all other teams will play nine times. Three in-state series will be guaranteed home-and-homes: Illinois and Northwestern, Indiana and Purdue, and Michigan and Michigan State will always play twice. The conference opponent list was released on April 19, 2018. Michigan State released its full schedule on August 21, 2018.

Date time, TV	Rank^{#}	Opponent^{#}	Result	Record	High points	High rebounds	High assists	Site (attendance) city, state
Exhibition
October 30, 2018*; 7:00 pm, BTN Plus	No. 10	Northern Michigan	W 93–47		24 – Ward	10 – Tillman	7 – Winston	Breslin Center (14,797); East Lansing, MI
Regular season
November 6, 2018*; 7:00 pm, ESPN	No. 10	vs. No. 1 Kansas; Champions Classic	L 87–92	0–1	18 – Langford	11 – Goins	11 – Winston	Bankers Life Fieldhouse (18,907); Indianapolis, IN
November 11, 2018*; 6:00 pm, BTN	No. 10	Florida Gulf Coast	W 106–82	1–1	25 – Ward	10 – Tied	8 – Winston	Breslin Center (14,797); East Lansing, MI
November 14, 2018*; 7:00 pm, BTN Plus	No. 11	Louisiana–Monroe; Las Vegas Invitational campus game	W 80–59	2–1	23 – Winston	15 – Goins	3 – Tied	Breslin Center (14,797); East Lansing, MI
November 18, 2018*; 6:00 pm, BTN	No. 11	Tennessee Tech; Las Vegas Invitational campus game	W 101–33	3–1	23 – Ward	11 – Tillman	6 – Winston	Breslin Center (14,797); East Lansing, MI
November 22, 2018*; 10:00 pm, FS1	No. 11	vs. No. 17 UCLA; Las Vegas Invitational semifinal	W 87–67	4–1	19 – Winston	13 – Goins	7 – Winston	Orleans Arena (7,489); Paradise, NV
November 23, 2018*; 6:30 pm, FOX	No. 11	vs. Texas; Las Vegas Invitational championship	W 78–68	5–1	29 – Langford	8 – Ward	10 – Winston	Orleans Arena; Paradise, NV
November 27, 2018*; 7:30 pm, ESPN	No. 9	at Louisville; ACC–Big Ten Challenge	L 78–82 ^{OT}	5–2	15 – Tied	17 – Goins	6 – Winston	KFC Yum! Center (15,477); Louisville, KY
November 30, 2018; 6:00 pm, BTN	No. 9	at Rutgers	W 78–67	6–2 (1–0)	22 – Winston	9 – Goins	6 – Winston	Louis Brown Athletic Center (8,000); Piscataway, NJ
December 3, 2018; 6:30 pm, FS1	No. 10	No. 18 Iowa	W 90–68	7–2 (2–0)	26 – Ward	14 – Goins	12 – Winston	Breslin Center (14,797); East Lansing, MI
December 8, 2018*; 12:00 pm, CBS	No. 10	at Florida	W 63–59	8–2	14 – Tillman	9 – Tillman	6 – Winston	Exactech Arena (10,423); Gainesville, FL
December 16, 2018*; 5:00 pm, BTN	No. 9	Green Bay	W 104–83	9–2	28 – Ward	9 – Tied	12 – Winston	Breslin Center (14,797); East Lansing, MI
December 21, 2018*; 7:00 pm, BTN	No. 10	Oakland	W 99–69	10–2	26 – Winston	7 – Tied	5 – Tillman	Breslin Center (14,797); East Lansing, MI
December 29, 2018*; 2:00 pm, BTN	No. 8	Northern Illinois	W 88–60	11–2	24 – Winston	13 – Tillman	7 – Winston	Breslin Center (14,797); East Lansing, MI
January 2, 2019; 8:30 pm, BTN	No. 8	Northwestern	W 81–55	12–2 (3–0)	21 – Ward	12 – Goins	12 – Winston	Breslin Center (14,797); East Lansing, MI
January 5, 2019; 12:00 pm, FOX	No. 8	at No. 14 Ohio State	W 86–77	13–2 (4–0)	25 – Winston	8 – Tied	5 – Winston	Value City Arena (18,809); Columbus, OH
January 8, 2019; 9:00 pm, ESPN2	No. 6	Purdue	W 77–59	14–2 (5–0)	23 – Winston	11 – Goins	6 – Goins	Breslin Center (14,797); East Lansing, MI
January 13, 2019; 4:30 pm, CBS	No. 6	at Penn State	W 71–56	15–2 (6–0)	16 – Ward	11 – Ward	6 – Winston	Bryce Jordan Center (10,196); University Park, PA
January 17, 2019; 8:00 pm, FS1	No. 6	at Nebraska	W 70–64	16–2 (7–0)	29 – Winston	11 – Goins	6 – Winston	Pinnacle Bank Arena (15,923); Lincoln, NE
January 21, 2019; 6:30 pm, FS1	No. 6	No. 13 Maryland	W 69–55	17–2 (8–0)	14 – Tied	12 – Goins	7 – Winston	Breslin Center (14,797); East Lansing, MI
January 24, 2019; 7:00 pm, FS1	No. 6	at No. 19 Iowa	W 82–67	18–2 (9–0)	23 – Winston	10 – Ward	7 – Winston	Carver–Hawkeye Arena (14,416); Iowa City, IA
January 27, 2019; 1:00 pm, CBS	No. 6	at Purdue	L 63–73	18–3 (9–1)	23 – Winston	7 – Tied	8 – Winston	Mackey Arena (14,804); West Lafayette, IN
February 2, 2019; 6:00 pm, ESPN	No. 6	Indiana; ESPN College GameDay	L 75–79 ^{OT}	18–4 (9–2)	26 – Winston	8 – Tied	7 – Winston	Breslin Center (14,797); East Lansing, MI
February 5, 2019; 7:00 pm, ESPN2	No. 9	at Illinois	L 84–89	18–5 (9–3)	21 – Winston	8 – Tillman	9 – Winston	State Farm Center (12,960); Champaign, IL
February 9, 2019; 2:00 pm, ESPN	No. 9	Minnesota	W 79–55	19–5 (10–3)	22 – Ward	9 – Ward	9 – Winston	Breslin Center (14,797); East Lansing, MI
February 12, 2019; 7:00 pm, ESPN2	No. 11	at No. 20 Wisconsin	W 67–59	20–5 (11–3)	23 – Winston	9 – Goins	6 – Winston	Kohl Center (17,287); Madison, WI
February 17, 2019; 1:00 pm, CBS	No. 11	Ohio State	W 62–44	21–5 (12–3)	14 – McQuaid	10 – Goins	8 – Winston	Breslin Center (14,797); East Lansing, MI
February 20, 2019; 6:30 pm, BTN	No. 10	Rutgers	W 71–60	22–5 (13–3)	28 – Winston	12 – Goins	8 – Winston	Breslin Center (14,797); East Lansing, MI
February 24, 2019; 3:45 pm, CBS	No. 10	at No. 7 Michigan; Rivalry	W 77–70	23–5 (14–3)	27 – Winston	11 – Goins	8 – Winston	Crisler Center (12,707); Ann Arbor, MI
March 2, 2019; 12:00 pm, FOX	No. 6	at Indiana	L 62–63	23–6 (14–4)	20 – Winston	7 – Tillman	11 – Winston	Simon Skjodt Assembly Hall (17,222); Bloomington, IN
March 5, 2019; 7:00 pm, ESPN2	No. 9	Nebraska	W 91–76	24–6 (15–4)	24 – Goins	8 – Tied	10 – Winston	Breslin Center (14,797); East Lansing, MI
March 9, 2019; 8:00 pm, ESPN	No. 9	No. 7 Michigan; Rivalry	W 75–63	25–6 (16–4)	23 – Winston	16 – Goins	7 – Winston	Breslin Center (14,797); East Lansing, MI
Big Ten tournament
March 15, 2019; 12:30 pm, BTN	(1) No. 6	vs. (8) Ohio State; Quarterfinals	W 77–70	26–6	18 – Winston	7 – Winston	5 – Tied	United Center (17,369); Chicago, IL
March 16, 2019; 12:00 pm, CBS	(1) No. 6	vs. (4) No. 19 Wisconsin; Semifinals	W 67–55	27–6	21 – Winston	13 – Goins	6 – Winston	United Center (18,468); Chicago, IL
March 17, 2019; 3:30 pm, CBS	(1) No. 6	vs. (3) No. 10 Michigan; Championship	W 65–60	28–6	27 – McQuaid	10 – Tillman	11 – Winston	United Center (18,615); Chicago, IL
NCAA tournament
March 21, 2019*; 2:45 pm, CBS	(2 E) No. 5	vs. (15 E) Bradley; First Round	W 76–65	29–6	26 – Winston	11 – Tillman	4 – Winston	Wells Fargo Arena (16,512); Des Moines, IA
March 23, 2019*; 7:45 pm, CBS	(2 E) No. 5	vs. (10 E) Minnesota; Second Round	W 70–50	30–6	14 – Tillman	9 – Henry	9 – Winston	Wells Fargo Arena (16,770); Des Moines, IA
March 29, 2019*; 7:09 pm, CBS	(2 E) No. 5	vs. (3 E) No. 12 LSU; Sweet Sixteen	W 80–63	31–6	20 – Henry	11 – Goins	8 – Winston	Capital One Arena (20,006); Washington, D.C.
March 31, 2019*; 5:05 pm, CBS	(2 E) No. 5	vs. (1 E) No. 1 Duke; Elite Eight	W 68–67	32–6	20 – Winston	9 – Tied	10 – Winston	Capital One Arena (20,125); Washington, D.C.
April 6, 2019*; 8:49 pm, CBS	(2 E) No. 5	vs. (3 W) No. 9 Texas Tech; Final Four	L 51–61	32–7	16 – Winston	8 – Tied	2 – Tied	U.S. Bank Stadium (72,711); Minneapolis, MN
*Non-conference game. ^{#}Rankings from AP Poll. (#) Tournament seedings in parentheses. E=East, W=West. All times are in Eastern Time.

== Player statistics ==
Individual player statistics (Final)
			Minutes		Scoring		Total FGs			3-point FGs			Free-Throws			Rebounds							
Player	GP	GS	Tot	Avg	Pts	Avg	FG	FGA	Pct	3FG	3FA	Pct	FT	FTA	Pct	Off	Def	Tot	Avg	A	Stl	Blk	TO
Ahrens, Kyle	30	8	563	18.8	141	4.7	53	120	.442	20	68	.294	15	18	.833	18	57	75	2.5	30	19	3	20
Bingham, Marcus	24	0	83	3.5	23	1.0	6	21	.286	6	14	.429	5	9	.556	4	22	26	1.1	7	0	10	4
Brown, Gabe	32	0	256	8.0	72	2.3	23	59	.390	16	43	.372	10	13	.769	10	28	38	1.2	4	2	4	2
Burke, Braden	9	0	13	1.4	5	0.6	2	5	.400	0	0		1	2	.500	2	1	3	0.3	0	0	0	0
George, Conner	18	0	28	1.6	10	0.6	4	8	.500	0	0		2	3	.667	1	8	9	0.5	1	1	0	0
Goins, Kenny	39	39	1185	30.4	309	7.9	109	269	.405	56	163	.344	65	48	.729	84	265	349	8.9	86	26	50	58
Henry, Aaron	39	22	860	22.1	235	6.0	92	187	.492	15	39	.385	36	52	.692	39	111	150	3.8	61	25	19	50
Hoiberg, Jack	14	0	16	1.1	10	0.7	2	6	.33	2	3	.66	4	4	1.000	1	1	2	0.1	3	1	0	5
Kithier, Thomas	30	0	183	6.1	49	1.6	26	29	.793	0	0		3	6	.500	14	26	40	1.3	5	3	3	7
Langford, Joshua	13	13	372	28.6	195	15.0	70	158	.443	29	72	.403	26	31	.839	9	38	47	3.6	30	11	1	31
Loyer, Foster	35	0	207	5.9	56	1.6	18	44	.409	8	27	.296	12	13	.923	1	13	14	0.4	32	4	0	20
McQuaid, Matt	36	35	1128	31.3	356	9.9	118	272	.434	73	173	.422	47	58	.810	24	84	108	3.0	73	21	4	35
Tillman, Xavier	39	14	935	24.0	389	10.0	144	238	.605	8	27	.293	93	127	.732	96	189	285	7.3	66	37	65	58
Ward, Nick	34	25	707	20.8	439	12.9	163	281	.580	2	2	1.000	111	170	.653	59	146	205	6.0	23	11	42	68
Washington, Brock	6	0	7	1.2	3	0.5	1	5	.200	0	2	.000	1	1	1.000	0	2	2	0.3	0	0	0	0
Winston, Cassius	39	39	1308	33.5	733	18.8	246	528	.460	84	211	.398	163	194	.840	13	104	117	3.0	292	40	4	114
Team																39	66	355					
Total	39		7850		3025	77.6	1071	2230	.480	319	844	.378	564	749	.753	414	1165	1579	40.5	716	201	205	493
Opponents	39		7850		2534	65.0	905	2378	.381	280	886	.316	444	654	.679	404	833	1237	31.7	470	243	117	398

Legend
GP	Games played	GS	Games started	Avg	Average per game
FG	Field-goals made	FGA	Field-goal attempts	Off	Offensive rebounds
Def	Defensive rebounds	A	Assists	TO	Turnovers
Blk	Blocks	Stl	Steals

== Rankings ==
Ranking movements Legend: ██ Increase in ranking ██ Decrease in ranking ( ) = First-place votes
	Week																				
Poll	Pre	1	2	3	4	5	6	7	8	9	10	11	12	13	14	15	16	17	18	19	Final
AP	10	11	11	9	10	9	10	8	8	6	6	6 (2)	6	9	11	10	6	9	6	5	Not released
Coaches	10	10^	11	8	10	9	8	7	7	5	6	5	8	11	12	11	8	11	7	6	3

*AP does not release post-NCAA Tournament rankings
^Coaches did not release a week 2 poll

== Awards and honors ==
=== In-season awards ===
Name	Award	Date
Nick Ward	Big Ten Player of the Week	January 7, 2019
Cassius Winston	Big Ten Player of the Week	November 26, 2018
Cassius Winston	Big Ten Player of the Week	December 31, 2018
Cassius Winston	Big Ten Player of the Week	January 21, 2019
Cassius Winston	Big Ten Player of the Week	January 28, 2019
Cassius Winston	Big Ten Player of the Week	February 25, 2019

=== Post-season awards ===
==== Kenny Goins ====
- All-Big Ten Honorable Mention (media and coaches)

==== Matt McQuaid ====
- All-Big Ten Honorable Mention (media and coaches)
- All-Big Ten Defensive Team

==== Xavier Tillman ====
- All-Big Ten Sixth Player of the Year
- NCAA Tournament All-East Regional Team

==== Nick Ward ====
- All-Big Ten Third Team (media and coaches)

==== Cassius Winston ====
- Big Ten Player of the Year
- All-Big Ten First Team (unanimous media and coaches)
- AP All-American First Team
- Sporting News All-American First Team
- USBWA All-American Second Team
- Consensus All-American Second Team
- Wooden Award All-American Team
- Wooden Award Finalist
- NABC All-District 7 First Team
- USBWA District V Player of the Year
- USBWA All-District V Team
- NCAA Tournament East Region Most Outstanding Player
