= WPHS =

Coordinates: 42.517°N 83.010°W

- Warren, Michigan; United States
- Broadcast area: Detroit, Michigan
- Frequency: 89.1 MHz
- Branding: Exile Radio

Programming
- Format: Variety (primarily College rock); High school station
- Affiliations: Oakland County FC; WCPE

Ownership
- Owner: Warren Consolidated Schools

History
- First air date: March 20, 1964
- Call sign meaning: Warren Public High School

Technical information
- Licensing authority: FCC
- Facility ID: 70892
- Class: A
- Power: 100 watts

Links
- Public license information: Public file; LMS
- Website: wphs.com

WPHS (89.1 FM) is a radio station owned and operated by Warren Consolidated Schools, in Warren, Michigan, United States. WPHS was originally broadcast on 91.5 FM with 10 watts; WPHS now operates with 100 watts on 89.1 FM. The radio station's first broadcast was on March 24, 1964.

The founding station manager and teacher was Charles Lampinen who retired in 1989. Jennifer Stanczyk took over for Lampinen in 1989 but was moved out of the radio program as part of budget cuts that took effect during the 2009–2010 school year. Stanczyk eventually retired from teaching as a whole following the 2018–2019 school year. Operations Manager Jeremy Olstyn currently runs the station.

Most of the shows on the station during the school year are student-produced, typically in the College Rock genre, with a slight mixture of electronica. Live shows are produced during scheduled classes, while recorded specialty shows (that diverge from College Rock) are recorded on take home studio kits, with recorded programs running the following evening. Formerly, on the weekends, the station played classical music received via C-Band satellite, the feed originating from WCPE in North Carolina. The station also broadcasts live high school sporting events, school board meetings, or other special events. Student shows are also featured on the station.

Every year WPHS runs a 'radio marathon', where students broadcast 24 hours a day for several days as a fundraiser. Generally, the funds raised are used to improve the station's equipment.
