= Elida Local School District =

School district in Ohio

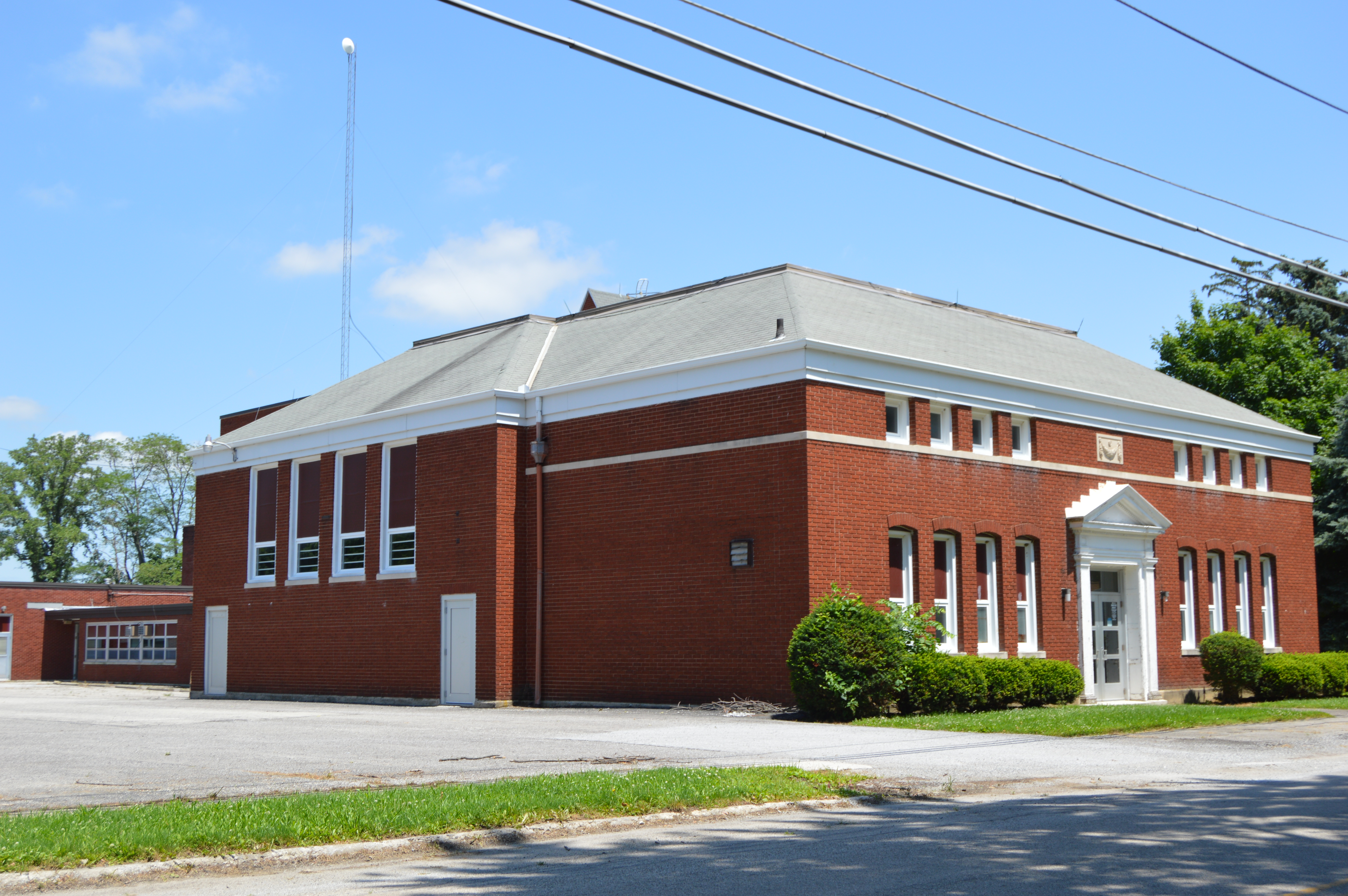
Former high school in Gomer

Elida Local Schools is a school district that serves the villages of Elida, Gomer, and surrounding areas in Allen County, Ohio, United States. The Elida School District was started in 1868. The district includes Elida High School, Elida Middle School, Elida Elementary School, and the Elida Central Office. The present high school opened for the 2011–2012 school year. The previous high school building was erected in 1914 with additions in 1956 and 1959. Gomer School merged with Elida Local School District in 1969 and closed at the end of the 2011–2012 school year, just shy of its one hundredth year in 2014. The Elida Field House was constructed in 1973 at the high school site. The elementary was built in 1962 and a new wing was added in 1967. The building housed kindergarten through sixth grade students, but currently houses students in kindergarten through fourth grade. The middle school opened in 1981 and is home to fifth through eighth grade. Prior to the middle school opening, the high school contained grades seven through twelve.

The High School and Middle School obtained a rating of Excellent, while the Elementary School obtained a grade of Effective. Elida also has a Choir and Band program.
