= Warren Mott High School =

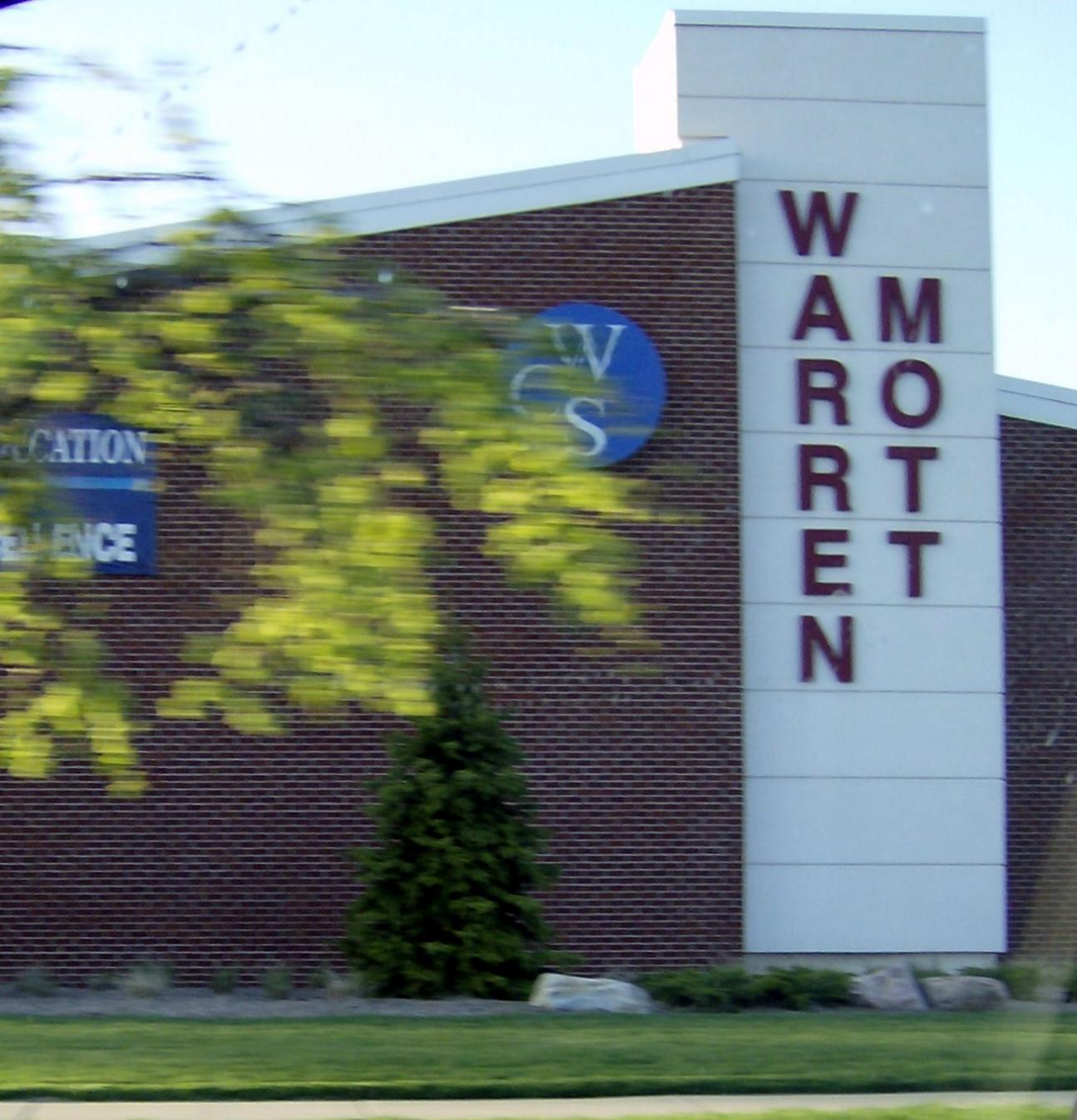

Location
- 3131 12 Mile Road; Warren, Michigan 48092; United States; 42°30′25″N 83°04′26″W

Information
- Other names: WMHS; Mott
- Type: Public high school
- School district: Warren Consolidated Schools
- NCES School ID: 263519007088
- Principal: Kevin Kittle
- Teaching staff: 60.70 (on an FTE basis)
- Grades: 9–12
- Enrollment: 1,335 (2024-2025)
- Student to teacher ratio: 21.99
- Colors: Maroon and White
- Athletics conference: Macomb Area Conference
- Nickname: Marauders
- Website: wmhs.wcskids.com

Warren Mott High School (WMHS, commonly referred to as Mott) is a public high school in Warren, Michigan, United States. It is part of the Warren Consolidated Schools district. It was founded in 1992 by the merger of the previous Warren High School and Charles Stewart Mott High School.

== History ==
Mott opened in 1965. It was originally named after Charles Stewart Mott who was a businessman and philanthropist.

In late 2003 the building went through renovations. The school board bought St Paul Albanian Catholic Church turning it to a new performing arts center. The renovations included security measures and a newly designed front entrance, climate control systems in the rooms, and new windows in every room that can serve as a fire escape in the event of an emergency.

During the 2011 Michigan education budget cuts, Warren Mott High School became, according to the Michigan Legislature, the most concerned school, attracting the attention of 12 Mile traffic with the "Go Red for Public Ed" protests.

Warren Mott went through various renovations during the Summer of 2011, including a complete parking lot change, roof repair, and technology upgrade. These renovations were funded by the millage passed in November 2009.

In 2014, Warren Mott High School hosted the Guinness Book of World Records 24 Hour Mile Challenge, a community running event organized as an attempt to set the Guinness World Record for the most people to complete one mile in a 24-hour relay. Held on August 2, 2014, at the Warren Mott High School track, the event attracted participants of all ages, including many of Michigan's top distance runners. Organizers reported that 218 runners completed the challenge, surpassing the previous benchmark of 180 participants.

== Band ==
The "Marauder Music Machine", is put together from four smaller bands of different musical levels; Cadet, Concert, Symphonic, and Wind Ensemble. The marching band has received division one ratings for the past five years at the MSBOA Marching Band Festival for their halftime show performances. They have been featured numerous times on the Macy's Thanksgiving Day Parade, and the Jazz band has also played at the 2008 Detroit Jazz Festival.

== Demographics ==
The demographic breakdown of the 1,448 students enrolled for the 2020–2021 school year was:

- Male - 52.4%
- Female - 47.6%
- Native American/Alaskan - 0.1%
- Asian - 24.5%
- Black - 15.0%
- Hispanic - 1.5%
- Native Hawaiian/Pacific Islander - 0.1%
- White - 56.2%
- Multiracial - 2.7%

In addition, 70.2% of the students qualified for free or reduced lunches.

== Notable alumni ==
- Gregg Bissonette, musician
- Matt Bissonette, musician
- Lauren Flax, DJ
- Rachel Komisarz, Olympic swimmer (medalist)
- Dean Hamel, professional football player, Washington Redskins, Dallas Cowboys
- Norm Wells, American football player
- Kenny Goins, basketball player
