= Kenny Goins =

American basketball player (born 1996)

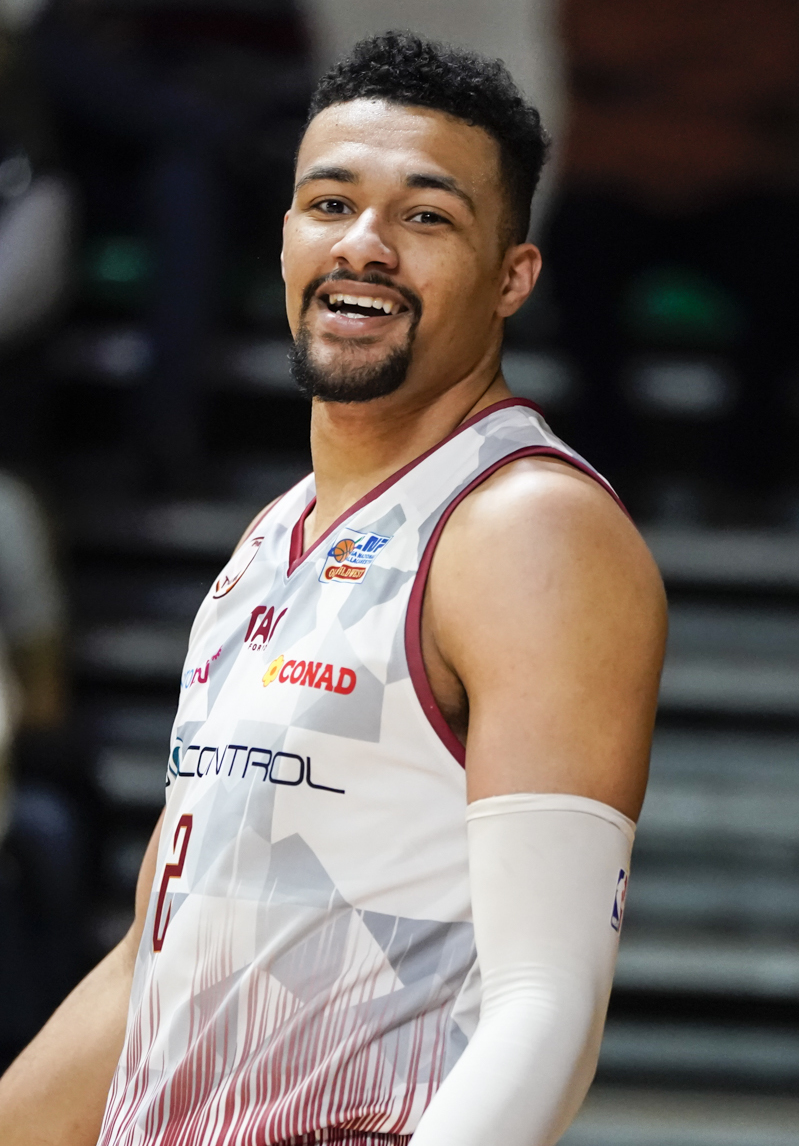
- Goins with Trapani in February 2020

No. 33 – Górnik Wałbrzych
- Position: Power forward
- League: PLK

Personal information
- Born: September 11, 1996 (age 30) Troy, Michigan
- Listed height: 6 ft 7 in (2.01 m)
- Listed weight: 230 lb (104 kg)

Career information
- High school: Warren Mott (Warren, Michigan)
- College: Michigan State (2015–2019)
- NBA draft: 2019: undrafted
- Playing career: 2019–present

Career history
- 2019–2020: Trapani
- 2020–2021: Kolossos Rodou
- 2021: Lavrio
- 2021–2022: Atomerőmű SE
- 2023: Correbasket UAT
- 2023–2024: Limoges CSP
- 2025: Manawatu Jets
- 2025–2026: Trefl Sopot
- 2026–present: Górnik Wałbrzych

Career highlights
- Polish Cup winner (2026)

Kenny Goins (born September 11, 1996) is an American professional basketball player for Górnik Wałbrzych of the Polish Basketball League (PLK). He played college basketball for the Michigan State Spartans.

== High school career ==
Goins played basketball for Warren Mott High School in Warren, Michigan. As a senior, he averaged 21.1 points, 14.8 rebounds and 4.8 blocks per game. Goins led his team to the Class A state quarterfinals and earned First Team All-State honors from the Associated Press. He played football for Mott as a tight end and had originally intended to play football in college, rather than basketball.

== College career ==
Goins turned down multiple NCAA Division I basketball scholarship offers to play for Michigan State as a walk-on, despite the financial burden, in his freshman season. His family took out a loan of $17,000. Goins redshirted his first year with the team and earned a scholarship in his following season. He was sidelined for six weeks as a freshman after undergoing surgery to repair a sports hernia. Goins posted 3.4 points and 4.5 rebounds per game as a sophomore and made 14 starts. As a junior, Goins averaged 2.1 points and 2.8 rebounds per game, shooting 45.8 percent from the field. A reserve for his first three years, Goins became a regular member of the starting lineup in his senior season. In his senior season debut, Goins scored a then-career-high 17 points and led the Spartans with 11 rebounds against top-ranked Kansas. On November 27, 2018, he grabbed a career-high 17 rebounds in an 82–78 overtime loss to Louisville. On March 5, 2019, Goins scored a career-high 24 points in a 91–76 win over Nebraska. On March 31, he made a go-ahead three-pointer with 34.5 seconds left in an Elite Eight victory over first-seeded Duke at the NCAA tournament. As a senior, Goins averaged 7.9 points and a team-high 8.9 rebounds per game. He was an All-Big Ten Honorable Mention selection.

== Professional career ==
After going undrafted in the 2019 NBA draft, Goins joined the Denver Nuggets for 2019 NBA Summer League. On July 18, 2019, he signed his first professional contract with Pallacanestro Trapani of the Serie A2 Basket. In 24 games, he averaged 11.5 points and 6.5 rebounds per game.

On August 22, 2020, Goins signed with Kolossos Rodou of the Greek Basket League. In 16 games, he averaged 9.8 points and 5.4 rebounds per game.

On July 1, 2021, Goins signed with Greek club Lavrio. He averaged 4.6 points and 3.9 rebounds in eight league games, and 4.5 points and 5.0 rebounds in four BCL games. On December 4, 2021, he signed with Atomerőmű SE of the Hungarian Nemzeti Bajnokság I/A. In 18 games, he averaged 8.3 points, 4.8 rebounds, 1.1 assists and 1.2 steals per game.

In August 2023, Goins joined Correbasket UAT of the Mexican LNBP. In 14 games, he averaged 5.4 points and 3.3 rebounds per game.

On November 8, 2023, Goins signed with Limoges CSP of the LNB Pro A. In 22 games, he averaged 3.6 points and 2.8 rebounds per game.

In December 2024, Goins signed with the Manawatu Jets of the New Zealand National Basketball League (NZNBL) for the 2025 season.

On August 15, 2025, he signed with Trefl Sopot of the Polish Basketball League (PLK).

On July 3, 2026, he signed with Górnik Wałbrzych of the Polish Basketball League (PLK).

== Career statistics ==
Legend
| GP | Games played | GS | Games started | MPG | Minutes per game |
| FG% | Field goal percentage | 3P% | 3-point field goal percentage | FT% | Free throw percentage |
| RPG | Rebounds per game | APG | Assists per game | SPG | Steals per game |
| BPG | Blocks per game | PPG | Points per game | **Bold** | Career high |

=== College ===
| Year | Team | GP | GS | MPG | FG% | 3P% | FT% | RPG | APG | SPG | BPG | PPG |
|---|---|---|---|---|---|---|---|---|---|---|---|---|
| 2015–16 | Michigan State | 26 | 0 | 10.2 | **.690** | - | .571 | 2.9 | .8 | .2 | .4 | 2.0 |
| 2016–17 | Michigan State | 35 | 14 | 18.3 | .578 | - | .667 | 4.5 | .6 | .2 | .6 | 3.4 |
| 2017–18 | Michigan State | 31 | 0 | 13.9 | .458 | .267 | .636 | 2.8 | 1.2 | .4 | .7 | 2.1 |
| 2018–19 | Michigan State | **39** | **39** | **30.4** | .405 | **.344** | **.729** | **8.9** | **2.3** | **.7** | **1.3** | **7.9** |
| Career | | 131 | 53 | 19.2 | .464 | .337 | .673 | 5.1 | 1.3 | .4 | .8 | 4.2 |
