= Norm Wells =

American football player (born 1957)

No. 66
- Position: Guard

Personal information
- Born: September 8, 1957 (age 69); Detroit, Michigan, U.S.
- Listed height: 6 ft 5 in (1.96 m)
- Listed weight: 261 lb (118 kg)

Career information
- High school: Warren (MI) Mott
- College: Northwestern
- NFL draft: 1980: 12th round, 330th overall pick

Career history
- Dallas Cowboys (1980–1982)

Career NFL statistics
- Games played: 3
- Stats at Pro Football Reference

Norman Edward Wells (born September 8, 1957) is an American former professional football player who was a guard in the National Football League (NFL) for the Dallas Cowboys. He was selected by the Cowboys in the 12th round of the 1980 NFL draft after playing college football for the Northwestern Wildcats.

== Early life ==
Wells attended Warren Mott High School, where he played defensive tackle. He accepted a football scholarship from Northwestern University. In 1978, he suffered a season-ending knee injury in the first game and received an extra year of eligibility.

He returned to become a starter at right defensive tackle. In his only year as a starter he posted 65 tackles (fifth on the team), 4 tackles for loss and one interception.

== Professional career ==
Wells was selected by the Dallas Cowboys in the twelfth round (330th overall) of the 1980 NFL draft. He was converted into an offensive guard in training camp. He played in three games on special teams before spraining his knee against the Tampa Bay Buccaneers and being placed on the injured reserve list on October 3, 1980. Wells was activated for the playoffs on January 2.

In 1981, his knee injury kept him on the injured reserve list all season. In 1982, he was placed again on injured reserve on August 24, after failing his physical from complications from his previous knee injury, that eventually forced him to retire.
