= Warren Consolidated Schools =

School district in Michigan

Address
- 31300 Anita Warren, Macomb, Michigan, 48093; United States

District information
- Grades: PreK–12
- Superintendent: John C. Bernia, Jr., Ed.D.
- Schools: 23
- Budget: $245,407,000 2022-2023 expenditures
- NCES District ID: 2635190

Students and staff
- Enrollment: 12,564 (2024-2025)
- Teachers: 753.8 FTE (2024-2025)
- Staff: 1,625.54 FTE (2024-2025)
- Student–teacher ratio: 16.67 (2024-2025)

Other information
- Website: www.wcskids.com

Warren Consolidated Schools is a public school district serving the cities of Warren, Sterling Heights and Troy, Michigan. It operates 25 schools including two specialized partial-day high schools that draw from the other schools within the district.

== History ==
Warren Consolidated was formed by 1941, when the North school became part of it. Also known as the Berz school, it was located on the West side of Mound just South of 15 Mile Road. That school was sold in August 1952. The district was led by superintendent James Clor from 1999 until November 2007. Dr. Robert D. Livernois took over as superintendent in April 2008 after leaving his former district and district neighbor, Warren Woods School District. On March 7, 2024 Dr. Livernois told the Community that he decided to retire from the district at the end of the summer - effective August 30, 2024.

On May 2, 2024 Walled Lake Consolidated Schools superintendent Dr. John C. Bernia was appointed as the new superintendent of Warren Consolidated Schools, replacing Dr. Livernois on August 30, 2024.

== Board of education ==
Current

- Leah Berdy
- I. Susan Kattula
- Adam Mazur-Baker
- Sharon L. Nemeth
- Carmela Rudd
- Susan G. Trombley
- Carl Weckerle

Former (year service ended)

- Kyle Johnson (2025)
- Brian White (2025)
- Megan E. Papasian-Broadwell (2024)
- Susan Jozwik (2022)
- Elaine Martin (2017)
- Ben Lazarus (2016)
- Loretta A. Crow (2012)
- Clifford Terry (2012)
- Diane Holden (2011)
- Brendan Paul Wagner (2010)
- Sherry Brasza (2010)
- Jon L. Green (2008)
- Pamela J. Arnold (2007)
- Lisa M. Murchison (2006)
- Daniel J. Smith (2006)
- John W. Hayden (2005)
- Julie Lemond (2005)
- Mindy Moore (2001)
- Terri Moncrieff (2001)
- John Bowen (2000)
- Sylvia Powell (2000)
- Sandy Kalfaian (1998)

== Special programs ==
Warren Consolidated alerts non-English speaking parents of disciplinary issues and emergencies using a "language line" system with interpreters.

All Bands in the District are in District 16 for (MSBOA) Michigan School Band and Orchestra Association.

== Schools ==
Schools in Warren Consolidated Schools District
School	Address	Notes
Elementary schools (grades K–5)
Green Acres Elementary School	4655 Holmes, Warren	
Homer Harwood Elementary School	4900 Southlawn, Sterling Heights	
Irma Cromie Elementary School	29797 Gilbert Dr., Warren	
Irene Wilkerson Elementary School	12100 Masonic, Warren	
John H. Siersma Elementary School	3100 Donna, Warren	
Margaret Black Elementary School	14100 Heritage Rd., Sterling Heights	
Margaret I. Susick Elementary School	2200 Castleton Dr., Troy	
Maurice M. Wilde Elementary School	32343 Bunert, Warren	
Pearl Lean Elementary School	2825 Girard, Warren	
Sven Holden Elementary School	37565 Calka Dr., Sterling Heights	
Thomas Jefferson Elementary School	37555 Carol Dr., Sterling Heights	
Willow Woods Elementary School	11001 Daniel Dr., Sterling Heights	
Middle schools (grades 6–8)
Agnes E. Beer Middle School	3200 Martin Rd., Warren	
Lois E. Carter Middle School	12000 Masonic, Warren	
Middle School Mathematics Science Technology Center (MS2TC)	27500 Cosgrove, Warren	Housed in Butcher Education Center.
Middle School Visual & Performing Arts Center (MSVPA)	27500 Cosgrove, Warren	Housed in Butcher Education Center.
Virgil I. Grissom Middle School	35701 Ryan Rd., Sterling Heights	
Will Carleton Middle School	8900 Fifteen Mile Rd., Sterling Heights	
High schools (grades 9–12)
Career Preparation Center	12200 Fifteen Mile Rd., Sterling Heights	
Community High School	35201 Davison St., Sterling Heights	Housed at Hatherly Education Center.
Macomb Mathematics Science Technology Center	27500 Cosgrove, Warren	Housed in Butcher Education Center.
Paul K. Cousino High School	30333 Hoover Rd., Warren	Houses the Districts Radio/TV Program, & Auto Repare Program.
Sterling Heights High School	12901 15 Mile Rd., Sterling Heights	Built 1971
Warren Consolidated School of Performing Arts	12901 15 Mile Rd., Sterling Heights	Located within Sterling Heights High School
Warren Mott High School	3131 Twelve Mile Rd., Warren	

=== Learning Centers ===
==== Hatherly Educational Center ====
- It was previously operated as Hatherly Elementary School. In 2014 the district announced that Hatherly Elementary would close, with the building becoming Hatherly Educational Center. The center received the Macomb County Head Start Program, the district Early Childhood Special Education (ECSE), the Great Start Readiness Program (GSRP) or "World of Fours", and the district's tuition-based preschool. These programs were respectively hosted at Lean Elementary School and Fillmore Year-Round Elementary School, Siersma Year-Round Elementary School, Holden Elementary School, and Siersma Year-Round, and Willow Woods Elementary School, respectively.
- As of 2017, Hatherly Educational Center currently houses Community High School, the alternative education high school of Warren Consolidated Schools district.

==== Annie Flynn Educational Center (Sterling Heights) ====
- The center, located in proximity to Metropolitan Parkway and Ryan Road, was previously operated as Annie E. Flynn Middle School. In 2014 the district announced that Flynn Middle would close, with the building becoming Flynn Educational Center. Community High School and Adult Education English as a Second Language (ESL) were to move to Flynn, with the former coming from Butcher Educational Center and the latter from Sterling Heights High.
- As of 2011, the school had 640 students. Almost 66% of the students were bilingual in English and another language, and the majority of the students were second generations in immigrant families. Former principal Charles Kluka characterized the school's environment as a salad bowl instead of a melting pot. The most common foreign languages spoken at Flynn were Albanian and Arabic. Other students were Assyrian, Bosnian, Cantonese, Filipino, Hmong, Indian, Korean, and Vietnamese, and there were 26 primary home languages among the Flynn students. The school had an English as a second language program with over 50 students, and it provided three interpreters who assist persons during special events held at night and in classrooms during school hours.
- Flynn Educational Center is currently owned by MISD, and houses a Secondary Autism Program.

==== Butcher Educational Center ====
Previously operated as Thomas Butcher Junior High School until 1982, it has housed the Macomb Mathematics Science Technology Center since 1989, the Middle School Mathematics Science Technology Center since 2013, and the Middle School Visual and Performing Arts program since 2014. It also previously housed Community High School until 2014, when it was transferred to Flynn Educational Center following its opening.

==== Angus Educational Center ====
Operated as Angus Elementary School until it closed in 2019, currently operates as Angus Educational Center. Angus currently houses the district's Early Childhood Special Education (ECSE).

=== Former Schools ===
Several schools once in the district have been closed:

- Angus Elementary school - closed in 2019 - currently Angus Educational Center
- Monfort Elementary - closed 1958 - Fellowship Chapel on 14 Mile Road now sits on the site
- Warren High School - closed in 1992 - current Warren Community Center, owned by the City of Warren
- Oscar Hartsig Junior High School - closed in 1981 - demolished in 2022
- Thomas Butcher Junior High School - closed in 1982 - currently Butcher Educational Center
- Ernest O. Melby Junior High School - closed in 1985 - currently Regina High School
- John C. Fuhrmann Junior High School - closed in 2003 - demolished in 2012 - Currently a subdivision on 14 Mile Rd
- Annie E. Flynn Middle School - closed in 2014 - currently Flynn Educational Center, sold to MISD
- Hatherly Elementary School - closed in 2014 - currently Hatherly Educational Center and currently houses Community High School
- Albert Bever Elementary School - closed in 1978 - currently WCS Administration Building
- County Line Elementary School - closed in 1978 - currently a shopping center at the corner of 15 Mile & Dequindre
- Helen Fillmore Elementary School - closed in 2015 - demolished in 2024, to be rebuilt as a MISD building
- Robert Frost Elementary School - closed in 1980 - demolished in 2006 - Currently Arthur J. Miller Park
- John S. Haitema Elementary School - closed in 1992 - sold to MISD
- Robert J. Hesse Elementary School - closed in 1980 - building still standing, now part of a housing complex built on the former school grounds, located in the 29700 block of Boewe Drive
- John F. Holland Elementary School - closed in 1981 - used during the summers until the mid-1980s by the City of Warren Parks & Recreation Dept. - demolished in 1993 - currently a subdivision
- Charles J. Marshall Elementary School - closed in 1980. Currently St. Thomas Orthodox Church of India.
- Maple Lane Elementary School - closed in 1980 - sold to MISD
- William E. Murthum Elementary School - closed in 1978 - partially demolished in 1987, and then totally demolished in 1992
- North Elementary School - closed in 1992 - demolished in 1993 - currently condominiums
- William H. Pennow Elementary School - closed in 1981 - currently a business
- William Pfromm Education Center - closed in 2010 - demolished in 2020
- Frank A. Rinke Elementary School - closed in 1981 - currently Macomb Christian School
- Norman Rockwell Elementary School - closed in 1978 - sold to MISD - currently Norman Rockwell Junior High School
- Alan B. Shepard Elementary School - closed in 1981 - demolished - currently LAM Christian Church
- South Elementary School - closed in 1984 - demolished in 1992 - currently a subdivision
- Jim Thorpe Elementary School - closed in 2003 - used for Sterling Heights Police Department Training - demolished in 2006 - currently a subdivision
- Gordon J. Warner Elementary School - closed in 1993 - demolished in 2012
- Louise B. Weber Elementary School - closed in 1979 - demolished - currently a subdivision
- Warren East Elementary School - Currently multiple businesses located including the Consulate General of Mexico
- Warren West Elementary School - Currently Shiv Mandir - Temple of Joy
- Wildwood Elementary School - closed in 1978 - currently Immaculate Conception School
