= Elida, Ohio =

- Village
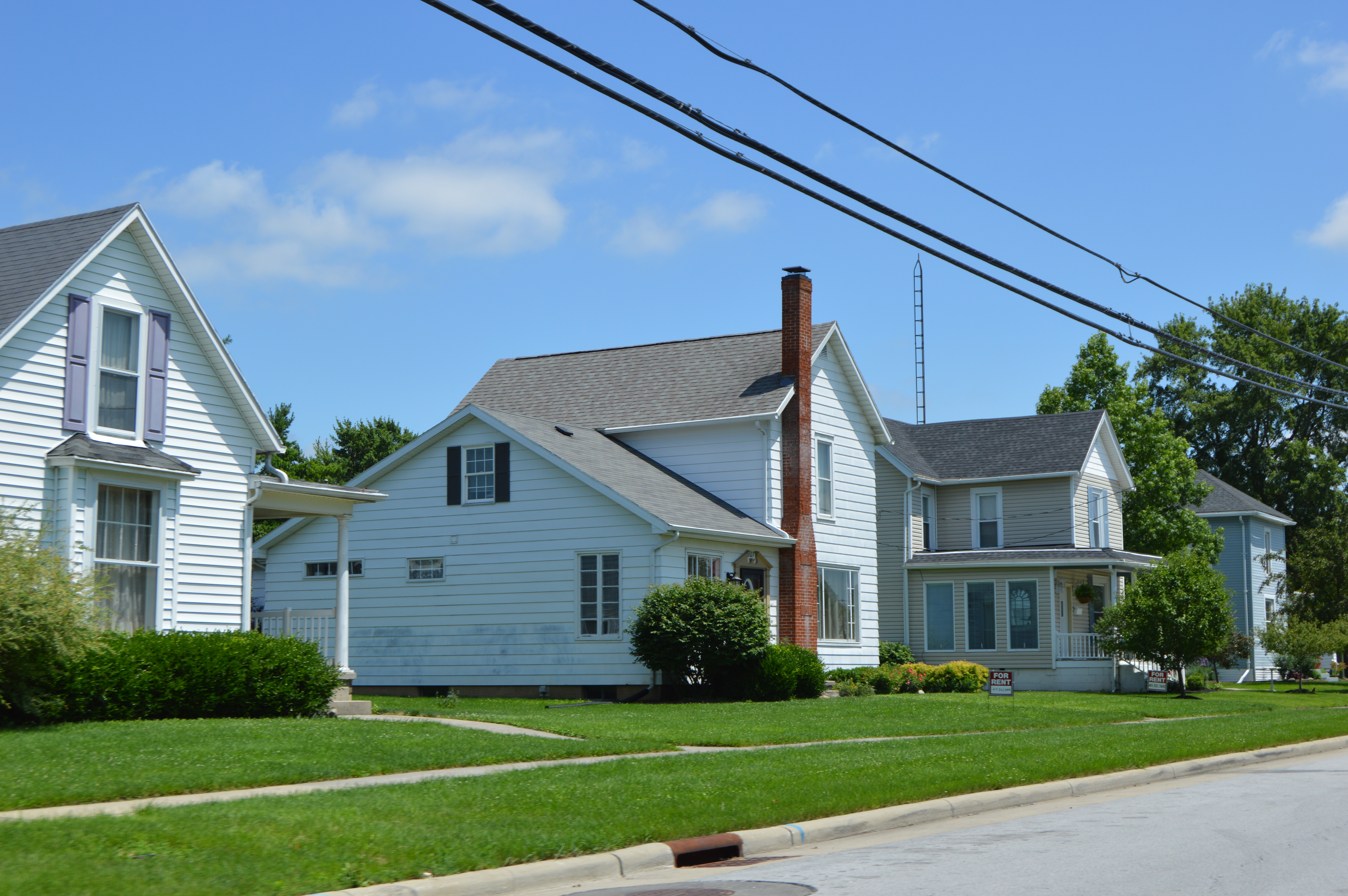
- Houses on Main Street

- Flag

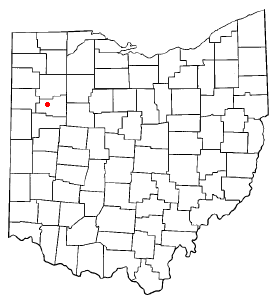
- Location of Elida, Ohio

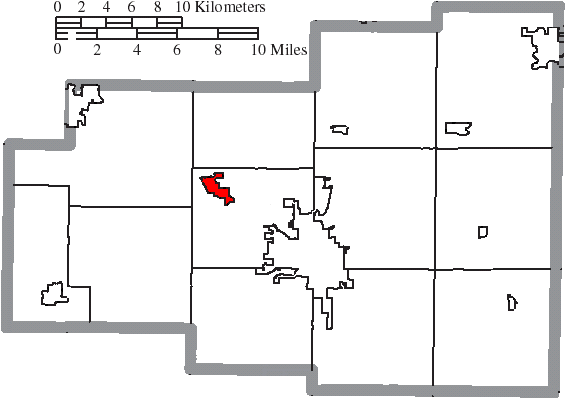
- Location of Elida in Allen County
- Coordinates: 40°47′12″N 84°11′56″W
- Country: United States
- State: Ohio
- County: Allen
- Township: American

Government
  - Mayor: Darryl Nichols

Area
  - Total: 1.17 sq mi (3.02 km^{2})
  - Land: 1.17 sq mi (3.02 km^{2})
  - Water: 0 sq mi (0.00 km^{2})
- Elevation: 801 ft (244 m)

Population (2020)
  - Total: 1,923
  - Estimate (2023): 1,900
  - Density: 1,651/sq mi (637.3/km^{2})
- Time zone: UTC-5 (Eastern (EST))
  - Summer (DST): UTC-4 (EDT)
- ZIP code: 45807
- Area code: 419
- FIPS code: 39-24808
- GNIS feature ID: 2398799
- Website: voelida.com

Elida (/iˈlaɪdə/ ee-LY-də) is a village in Allen County, Ohio, United States. The population was 1,923 at the 2020 census. It is included in the Lima, Ohio Metropolitan Statistical Area.

== History ==
Elida was laid out in 1852. A post office called Elida was established in 1854, and remained in operation until 1959. The village was incorporated in 1878.

== Geography ==
According to the United States Census Bureau, the village has a total area of 1.22 square miles (3.16 km^{2}), all land.

== Demographics ==
Historical population
Census	Pop.	Note	%±
1870	533		—
1880	302		−43.3%
1890	399		32.1%
1900	440		10.3%
1910	447		1.6%
1920	509		13.9%
1930	542		6.5%
1940	551		1.7%
1950	607		10.2%
1960	1,215		100.2%
1970	1,211		−0.3%
1980	1,349		11.4%
1990	1,486		10.2%
2000	1,917		29.0%
2010	1,905		−0.6%
2020	1,923		0.9%
2023 (est.)	1,900	▼	−1.2%
U.S. Decennial Census

=== 2010 census ===
As of the census of 2010, there were 1,905 people, 708 households, and 559 families living in the village. The population density was 1,561.5 inhabitants per square mile (602.9/km^{2}). There were 741 housing units at an average density of 607.4 per square mile (234.5/km^{2}). The racial makeup of the village was 94.3% White, 2.6% African American, 0.1% Native American, 0.8% Asian, 0.7% from other races, and 1.6% from two or more races. Hispanic or Latino of any race were 1.6% of the population.

There were 708 households, of which 37.0% had children under the age of 18 living with them, 65.0% were married couples living together, 9.0% had a female householder with no husband present, 4.9% had a male householder with no wife present, and 21.0% were non-families. 18.1% of all households were made up of individuals, and 7.7% had someone living alone who was 65 years of age or older. The average household size was 2.69 and the average family size was 3.04.

The median age in the village was 40.2 years. 26.4% of residents were under the age of 18; 7.3% were between the ages of 18 and 24; 21.5% were from 25 to 44; 32.7% were from 45 to 64; and 12.1% were 65 years of age or older. The gender makeup of the village was 48.7% male and 51.3% female.

=== 2000 census ===
As of the census of 2000, there were 1,917 people, 698 households, and 552 families living in the village. The population density was 1,852.1 inhabitants per square mile (715.1/km^{2}). There were 717 housing units at an average density of 692.7 per square mile (267.5/km^{2}). The racial makeup of the village was 95.72% White, 1.93% African American, 0.57% Asian, 0.05% Pacific Islander, 0.73% from other races, and 0.99% from two or more races. Hispanic or Latino of any race were 1.46% of the population.

There were 698 households, out of which 41.4% had children under the age of 18 living with them, 67.6% were married couples living together, 9.5% had a female householder with no husband present, and 20.8% were non-families. 18.5% of all households were made up of individuals, and 8.0% had someone living alone who was 65 years of age or older. The average household size was 2.75 and the average family size was 3.15.

In the village, the population was spread out, with 30.2% under the age of 18, 6.6% from 18 to 24, 28.6% from 25 to 44, 23.7% from 45 to 64, and 11.0% who were 65 years of age or older. The median age was 37 years. For every 100 females there were 95.6 males. For every 100 females age 18 and over, there were 90.2 males.

The median income for a household in the village was $49,293, and the median income for a family was $58,750. Males had a median income of $41,895 versus $26,635 for females. The per capita income for the village was $20,573. About 3.1% of families and 3.1% of the population were below the poverty line, including 3.4% of those under age 18 and 2.4% of those age 65 or over.

== Education ==
Elida is home to the Elida Local School District, and has a public library, a branch of the Lima Public Library.

== Notable people ==
- Floyd Gahman, landscape artist
- Zachary Green, WWE Nash Carter
- Dakota Mathias, NBA basketball player
