= Warren High School (Warren, Michigan) =

High school in Warren, Michigan

Warren High School was the first public high school in Warren, Michigan. It was a part of Warren Consolidated Schools.

== History ==
In 1926, William E. Murthum School was built on the corner of Seventh Avenue and Arden. It was the first brick school in Warren and housed Grades K-12. In 1931, an addition was built which housed the high school. Due to the increasing enrollment, a cinder block building was constructed in 1944 paid for with World War II bonds and was named the "Victory Wing." Warren High School was housed in the Victory Building from 1944-1950. Once again, the enrollment grew and a new high school building was constructed on land next to Murthum. Murthum was then K-7 and Warren was 8-12. This arrangement lasted until 1958 when John C. Fuhrmann Junior High opened. It was then Murthum (K-6), Fuhrmann (7-9) and Warren (10-12).

Murthum was closed at the end of the 1977-78 school year. The Victory wing (1-3) was torn down a few years after closing. The kindergarten and 4-6 grade wing were torn down in 1988. The last remaining parts, library, upstairs and gym were demolished in 1992. An inline skating rink now sits on the site.

Fuhrmann was finally closed at the end of the 2002-03 school year and was torn down July 2012, the site was on 14 Mile, halfway between Mound and Ryan. The site is being developed for housing.

Warren High School closed at the end of 1991-92 school year.

In 2002, the Warren High school building was renovated and turned into the Warren Community Center and houses the Miller Branch of the Warren Public Libraries, the Parks and Recreation Department for the city and the Warren Historical Society.

== Sports ==
The school nickname was the Orioles and the colors were black and orange. The Orioles had their share of success over the years. In football, Warren won 14 conference championships and twice (1953, 1957) had undefeated seasons. In track and field from 1962–65, the Orioles won 33 consecutive dual meets. In basketball, they won seven district championships. In 1963-64, they beat Lakeshore, 65-56, to win the only Regional championship in school history. They had lost twice to the Shorians during the regular season.

== Notable alumni ==
- Frank Goodish (born 1946) – Professional wrestler also known as Bruiser Brody
- William LeVise (born 1945) – Rock musician better known as Mitch Ryder
